= MV Alam Pintar and FV Etoile des Ondes collision =

Shipping collision in 2009

The MV Alam Pintar and FV Etoile des Ondes collision took place in the English Channel in 2009 and involved the Singapore bulk carrier Alam Pintar and the UK fishing vessel Etoile des Ondes. The fishing vessel sank and, although three of its four crew were rescued, one member, Chris Wadsworth, was never found. The bulk carrier continued on its passage although its crew knew of the collision and later made attempts to hide the fact of their knowledge. Three other vessels nearby did not respond to Etoiles' distress calls, even though these were also broadcast by the coastguards. The rescue was eventually carried out by the ferry MV Norman Voyager. The UK's Marine Accident Investigation Branch (MAIB) carried out a full investigation of the incident and issued a damning report. Safety recommendations were made but under maritime law national governments have no authority over foreign-flagged vessels more than 12 nautical miles (22 km) from their coasts. No country attempted any criminal prosecutions.

== Vessels ==
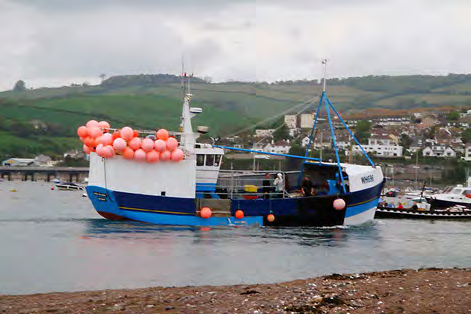
FV Etoile des Ondes, the fishing boat in question which was sunk by Alam Pintar

FV Etoile des Ondes was a UK-flagged fishing vessel (WH 696) registered in Weymouth, Dorset that had been built by Rolland shipyard, Plougasnou in 1957. She was of 40 gross tonnage, 14.5 metres (48 ft) long, and built of wood. She was owned by David and Ron Simmonds; the skipper was Chris Bibb and the other crew were Matthew Collins, Daniel Bruce and Chris Wadsworth, all from Teignmouth, Devon. (Note: Something of the working conditions can be seen in a series of videos taken from Etoile des Ondes at Christmas 2007 during a gale (at the time of the sinking the sea was calm). Credit: Adrian Bart. (3:42), (0:32, identifying the vessel), (0:59), (0:32), (1:17).)

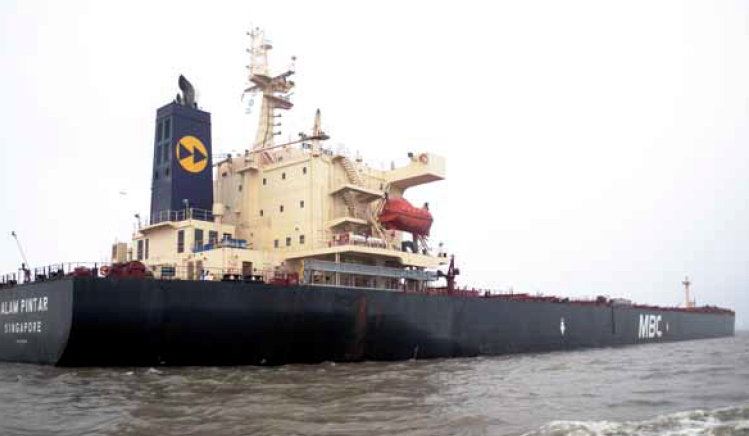
MV Alam Pintar, the bulk carrier which sank the fishing boat

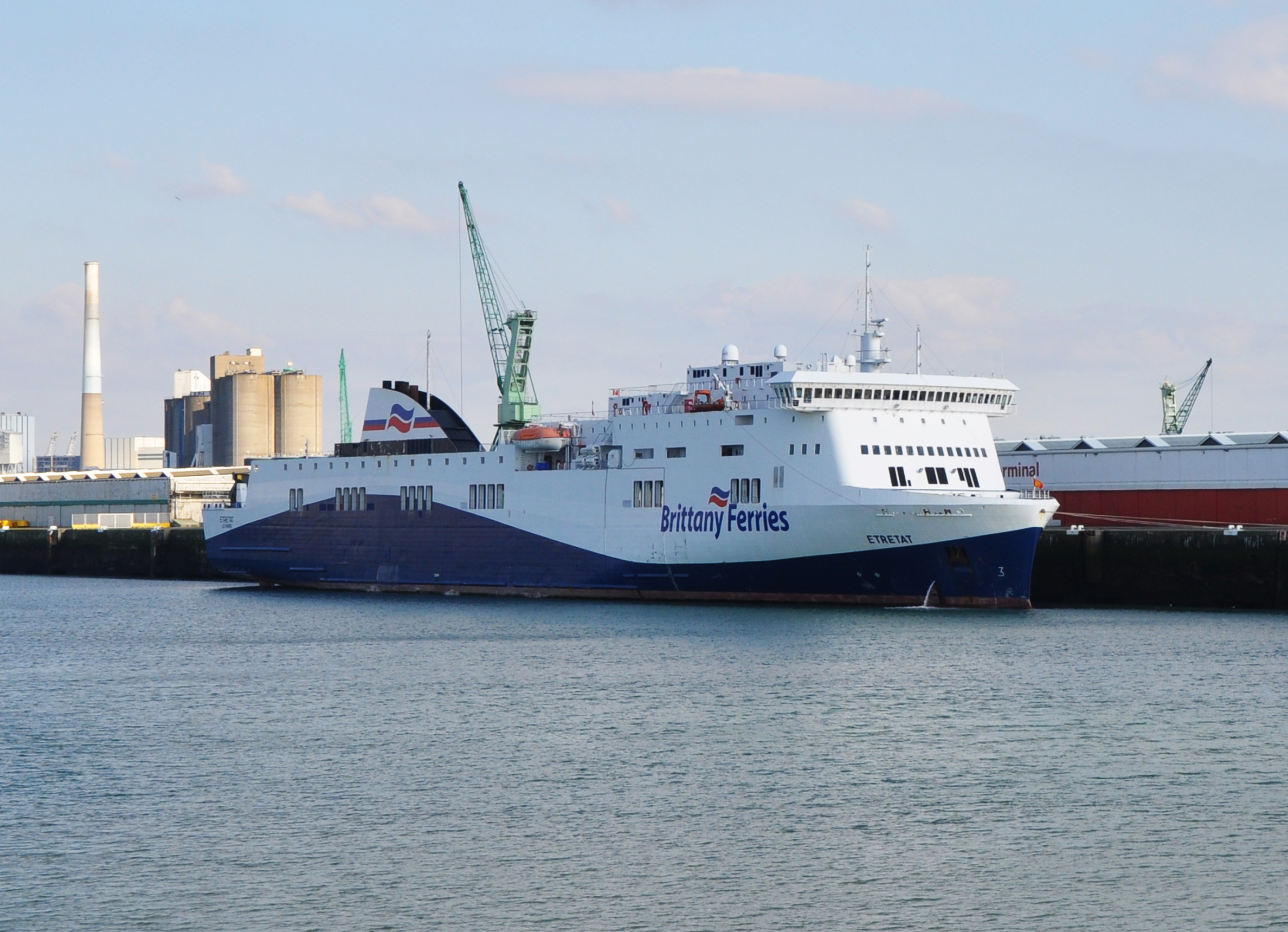
MV Norman Voyager, sailing for Brittany Ferries as Etrétat, which was involved in the rescue of the Etoile des Ondes' crew

MV Alam Pintar is a Singapore-flagged and -registered bulk carrier (IMO Number: 9296858) that was built in Yokohama in 2005. She is post-Panamax, (Note: Post-Panamax ships will not fit through the Panama Canal but can transit the Suez Canal and Strait of Malacca.) of 46,982 gross tonnage and 229 metres (751 ft) long. At the time she was owned by Alam Pintar Maritime (UK) Ltd within the Malaysian Bulk Carriers (Malaysia) Group, operated and managed by PACCShip (UK) Ltd and crewed primarily by Chinese nationals.

The rescuing vessel was, at the time, the Celtic Link Ferries' vessel MV Norman Voyager.

== Collision and rescue ==
On the evening of 20 December 2009, Alam Pintar, on passage from Quebec to Hamburg, was between Les Casquets, France and the Traffic Separation Scheme of the Strait of Dover. Etoile des Ondes was crab fishing in the same area—her skipper had worked these fishing grounds for several years. The sky was clear and the sea conditions were slight. The lights on the French shore were clearly visible from Etoile. Alam Pintar's officer of the watch (OOW) first saw Etoile 3 to 4 nautical miles (5.6–7.4 km) ahead and altered course to avoid the fishing vessel but the latter changed course to cast her pots. Alam Pintar turned hard to starboard but this did not avoid a collision which took place at 18:51 GMT at 49°58′N 001°54′W, 15 nautical miles (28 km) north of the Cherbourg peninsula. The ship's master and the OOW knew there had been a collision but did not stop or try to check if the fishing vessel's crew was safe. They did not report the incident.

In the dark, three of Etoiles' crew were able to inflate and board their liferaft but the fourth member, Chris Wadsworth, was missing and, despite circling around, the survivors never saw him again. Etoile sank within a few minutes. The survivors triggered the EPIRB and fired distress flares which were observed by at least three other vessels that reported the sighting to Jobourg Marine Rescue Co-ordination Centre, the nearest coastal authority. Jobourg radio station took charge of the search and rescue and transmitted three "mayday relay" messages to which none of the three closest vessels responded.

When the flares were sighted by the ferry Norman Voyager, it was the vessel's report to Jobourg that led to the mayday relay. The ferry and two other vessels changed course to give assistance and the ferry rescued the three survivors at 19:47 and, because they were in a poor condition with hypothermia, headed towards Cherbourg at 21:00 to make a rendezvous with a French rescue helicopter that airlifted the men to hospital. Jobourg released the other two ships to continue on their way at 22:08. The search was called off at 04:27 the next morning.

== Investigations ==
The Hamburg police started to conduct an investigation but Alam Pintar's crew would only speak to marine investigators. The UK Marine Accident Investigation Branch conducted an investigation and published a full report in September 2010.

The report was damning. It said those on the bridge of Alam Pintar were inexperienced and the complement did not comply with the requirements for keeping a lookout. Their actions to avoid collision were ineffective because, although they changed course in good time, the change had not been sufficient. The standard of lookout on Etoile des Ondes had also been poor and the vessel's movements had been erratic. This, however, should have been expected for a boat when actually fishing.

It stated, "As Alam Pintar continued on passage to Hamburg, the ship’s documents and recordings, including those of the voyage data recorder (VDR), were altered or removed in an attempt to obscure any evidence suggesting a collision with Etoile". Of Etoile des Ondes: "None of the crew wore any form of buoyancy aid. Emergency lifejackets were provided, stowed above the wheelhouse, but the crew received insufficient warning to reach them before being thrown into the water." The fishing vessel had two EPIRBs (it was not required to have any) but it had no Automatic Identification System (it was not required to have one).

The report stated "The master, by assuming Etoile des Ondes was still afloat, and deciding to continue, was in disregard of his responsibilities. However, once he had reason to believe that Etoile des Ondes and her crew were not safe, his action in ignoring the mayday relay and continuing on passage was illegal, immoral and against all the traditions of the sea." Of the Norman Voyager: "Exemplary seamanship was demonstrated by the actions of the officers and crew of Norman Voyager in immediately reporting the flares to Jobourg MRCC and then proceeding, without question, to the assistance of the vessel in distress. The conduct of the rescue was safe, efficient and in the best traditions of the merchant navy."

The MAIB, RNLI and other bodies took several actions by way of warning vessel owners, masters and skippers of the accident, the dangers, the importance of keeping good watch and abiding by international law. The Chief Inspector wrote to the operators of the seven vessels that failed to try to give help asking them to explain the actions of their vessels and how they will get compliance with regulations in future. The MAIB made one official recommendation to the International Chamber of Shipping and other bodies that they should promulgate a "safety flyer".

== Aftermath ==
There was an unusual repercussion quite soon after the accident. In the introduction to 2010 MAIB Safety Digest the Chief Inspector of Marine Accidents, wrote:

MAIB is currently investigating the death of a seafarer, during which we have discovered evidence of dereliction of one of the most fundamental duties of the mariner - the moral and legal obligation to go to the aid of those in peril on the sea. Even at the height of war, civilised combatants went to great lengths to save the lives of sailors from enemy vessels they had sunk. Yet here we are, in the 21st Century, finding ships failing to respond to Mayday messages.

In the case we are investigating, poor visual lookout meant that most of the major vessels within 10 miles of the sinking vessel reportedly failed to see a series of distress flares. This in itself is disappointing, but even more alarmingly, most of the same ships also failed to respond to the Mayday Relay, issued several times by the Coastguard. Some claimed not to have heard the VHF (poor standard of watchkeeping again); some claimed not to have received the DSC distress alerts (!); and some masters claimed not to understand that they have a legal (and moral) duty to react.

— Meyer (2010), p. 7, Introduction

Meyer made it clear that this was in breach of international SOLAS Convention Regulation 33 - Distress Situations: Obligations and Procedures. At this time MAIB had not named the ship but Lloyd's List did give the name, drawing criticism from MAIB that the newspaper had made "sensationalist claims" and had "significantly harmed" its role in investigating maritime safety.

Although at the time of the accident MV Alam Pintar was owned and managed by British companies and evidence of serious wrongdoing had been found, no prosecution was possible in the UK under maritime law because the ship was not registered in the UK and it had been outside territorial waters. The UK Corporate Manslaughter and Corporate Homicide Act 2007 might have had jurisdiction because the fishing boat was UK-registered although Singapore, the country of registration of Alam Pintar, may also have had jurisdiction.

Singapore is not regarded as a flag of convenience country. Although the United Nations Convention for Registration of Ships attempted to require a vessel's owners have a "genuine link" with the country of registration, the convention has never been ratified.

The Maritime and Port Authority of Singapore conducted a marine safety investigation which found that the OOW had not ensured the bridge was properly staffed and had not taken sufficient action to avoid the collision. The Authority said "appropriate enforcement actions" would be taken against the officer. The ship's operators, Malaysian Bulk Carriers, said two crew members had been suspended pending the findings of the Singapore enquiry—Chris Wadsworth's family's claim for compensation would be met in full. However, the Port Authority "failed to uncover any malfeasance by the master of the Alam Pintar" and so did not take legal action. The incident was later highlighted in Rose George's 2013 book on merchant shipping, Ninety Percent of Everything.
