= Bass Trader =

Bass Trader may refer to ships operated by Australian National Line:

- Halley (ship) from 1961 until 1975
- Duba Bridge from 1976 until 1997
