= Stena Horizon =

Passenger and vehicle ferry

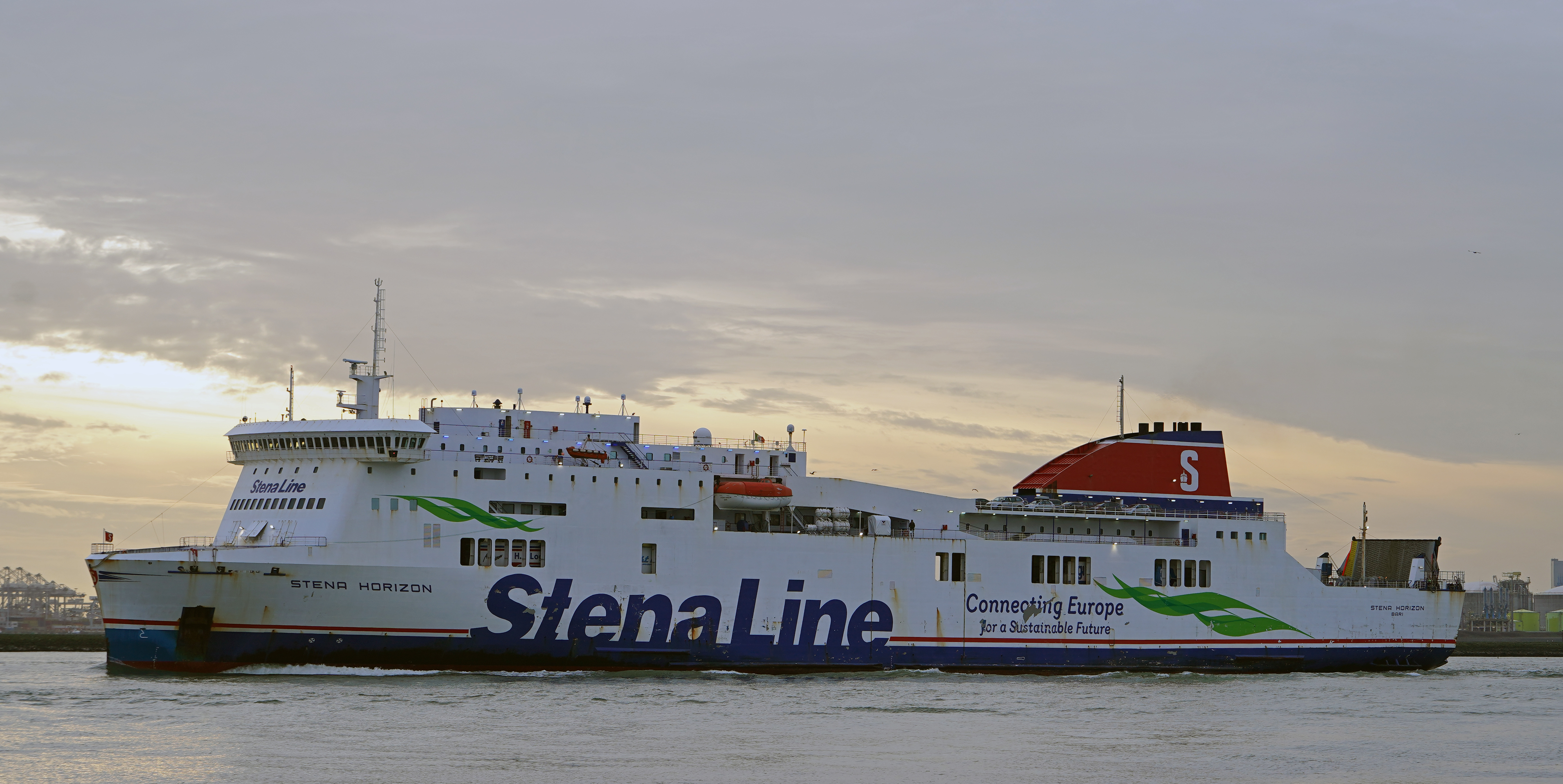
- Stena Horizon in 2024

History
- Name: 2006–2011: Cartour Beta; 2011–2014: Celtic Horizon; 2014 onwards: Stena Horizon
- Operator: 2006–2011: Caronte & Tourist; 2011–2014: Celtic Link Ferries; 2014 onwards: Stena Line
- Port of registry: 2006 onwards: Bari, Italy; October 2024 onwards: Limassol, Cyprus
- Route: Travemünde–Liepāja
- Builder: Cantiere Navale Visentini
- Yard number: 214
- Launched: 12 December 2005
- Identification: Call sign: IBPT; IMO number: 9332559; MMSI number: 247160400
- Status: In service

General characteristics
- Tonnage: 27,552 GT
- Length: 186.46 m (612 ft)
- Beam: 25.60 m (84 ft)
- Draught: 6.60 m (22 ft)
- Installed power: 2 x MAN 9L48/60B diesel engines
- Propulsion: 2 × controllable pitch propellers; 2 × bow thrusters
- Speed: 24 knots
- Capacity: 972 passengers (Restricted to 660 by Stena); 2,244 lane meters

Stena Horizon is a passenger and vehicle ferry operated by Stena Line. The vessel operates between Travemünde, Germany and Liepāja, Latvia.

== History ==
Stena Horizon was built in 2006 as the Cartour Beta. She was constructed at the Italian shipyard of Cantiere Navale Visentini.

=== Caronte & Tourist ===
Upon completion the vessel was chartered to Sicilian ferry operator Caronte & Tourist. The vessel operated between Salerno and Messina until replaced by a new ship in May 2011.

=== Celtic Link ===
In October 2011 the vessel entered service with Irish ferry operator Celtic Link Ferries replacing the Norman Voyager. Prior to entering service the ship was renamed Celtic Horizon.

=== Stena Line ===
On 26 February 2014 Stena Line announced that they had agreed to purchase Celtic Link Ferries with effect from 31 March 2014. Celtic Horizon was renamed Stena Horizon and is managed by Northern Marine Ferries. Stena Horizon carries a maximum of 660 passengers, though she has a design capacity for 972.

== Sisterships ==
Stena Horizon is the third of four near-identical ships built by Cantiere Navale Visentini. The other ships being Stena Mersey, Stena Lagan and Cartour Gamma.
