= Seawind =

Seawind may refer to:

== Cruise companies ==
- SeaWind Line, a subsidiary of a Finnish passenger shipping company
- SeaWind Cruise Line, the operator of the SeaWind Crown and eventual subsidiary of Premier Cruises

== Other ==
- Seawind Ocean Technology, an offshore wind energy technology company
- Seawind (band), a jazz fusion band
- Seawind 300C, a small amphibious aircraft
