= MS Norman Atlantic =

Italian passenger ferry; caught fire in 2014

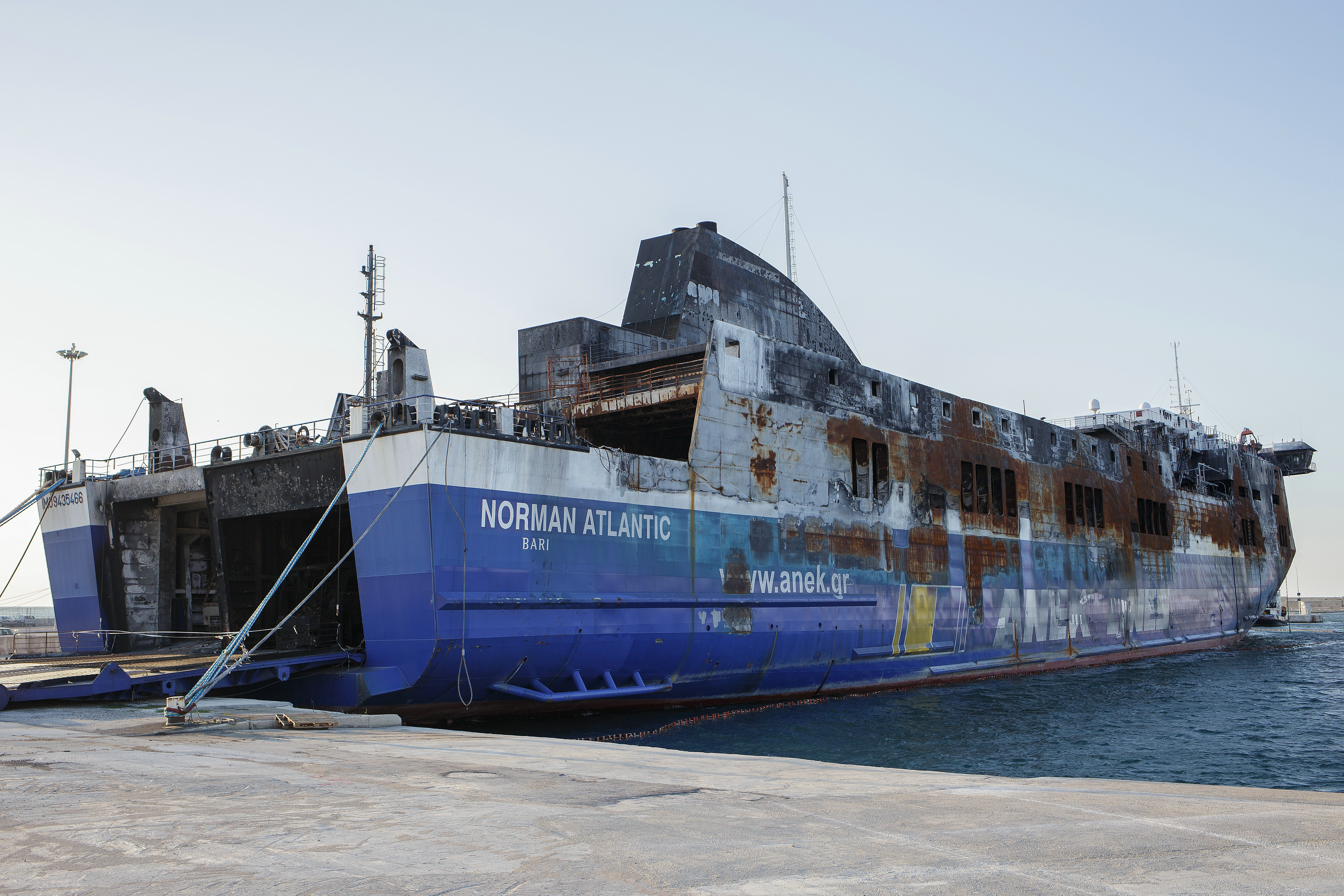
- The fire-damaged Norman Atlantic in the port of Bari, Italy, 2015

History
- Name: Akeman Street (2009–2011); Scintu (2011–2014); Norman Atlantic (2014–2019)
- Owner: Visemar di Navigazione S.r.l. (2009 onwards)
- Operator: Saremar (2011–2012); Grandi Navi Veloci (2013); Moby Lines (2013); LD Lines (2013–2014); Caronte and Tourist (October–December 2014); ANEK Lines (December 2014 – July 2019)
- Port of registry: Bari, Italy
- Route: Ancona–Igoumenitsa–Corfu–Patras
- Ordered: 1 November 2006
- Builder: Cantiere Navale Visentini, Porto Viro, Italy
- Yard number: 222
- Laid down: 19 December 2006
- Launched: 18 June 2009
- Completed: 2 November 2009
- Acquired: 21 September 2009
- Out of service: 28 December 2014
- Identification: Call sign: IBUM; IMO number: 9435466; MMSI number: 247277400
- Fate: Scrapped, 2019
- Notes: Sister ships: Stena Livia, GNV Sealand, Stena Flavia

General characteristics
- Type: Roll-on/Roll-off passenger (ROPAX) ferry
- Tonnage: 26,904 GT
- Length: 186.00 m (610 ft 3 in)
- Beam: 25.60 m (84 ft 0 in)
- Draught: 6.71 m (22 ft 0 in)
- Depth: 15.00 m (49 ft 3 in)
- Installed power: Two MAN B&W 9L48/60B diesel engines, 21,600 kW (29,000 hp)
- Speed: 23.5 knots (43.5 km/h; 27.0 mph) (cruising); 24.5 knots (45.4 km/h; 28.2 mph) (maximum)
- Capacity: 850 passengers; 200 vehicles
- Crew: 185

MS Norman Atlantic was a roll-on/roll-off passenger (ROPAX) ferry owned by the Italian ferry company Visemar di Navigazione. The ferry was chartered by ANEK Lines from December 2014. On 28 December 2014, she caught fire in the Strait of Otranto, in the Adriatic Sea.

At the time of the fire there were an estimated 475 people on board the ship including 417 passengers, 55 crew and at least three stowaways. Of these, 452 people were rescued and the bodies of 11 were recovered. It is known that 16 passengers died and it was estimated that there were 28 deaths overall, the uncertainty arising from estimates of the number of stowaways on board. Additionally, two crewmembers of the Albanian tug Iliria died during the salvage operations on 30 December.

== Description ==
The ship was 186 metres (610 ft 3 in) long, with a beam of 25.6 metres (84 ft 0 in) and a draught of 6.71 metres (22 ft 0 in). She was powered by two MAN B&W 9L48/60B diesel engines, which could propel the ship at 24 knots (44 km/h).

== History ==
The ship was built in 2009 by Cantiere Navale Visentini, Porto Viro, Italy as Akeman Street for Ermine Street Shipping Co Ltd, London, United Kingdom. Her sister ships are Étretat, Scottish Viking and Stena Flavia. She had accommodation for 850 passengers and 2,286 lane metres of accommodation for vehicles. Between February and April 2010, she was chartered to T-Link. Following a refit in May 2011 at Valletta, Malta, she was chartered to Saremar and renamed Scintu in June 2011. In January 2013, she was chartered to Grande Navi Veloci, followed by a charter to Moby Lines in April 2013. In October 2013, Scintu was chartered to LD Lines. She was renamed Norman Atlantic in January 2014. On 29 August 2014, she made her final voyage with LD Lines, from Rosslare, County Wexford, Ireland to Saint-Nazaire, Loire-Atlantique, France and Gijón, Asturias, Spain. In September 2014, she was chartered to Caronte & Tourist, followed by a charter to ANEK Lines in December 2014.

After the 2014 fire, the ship was docked at Bari, Italy during the investigations and legal actions. In July 2019 the ship was towed to Aliaga, Turkey and scrapped.

== 2014 fire ==
=== Incident ===
Norman Atlantic fire
- MS Norman Atlantic route
- Event: Fire of Norman Atlantic
- Location: Port of Igoumenitsa, Greece, Strait of Otranto
- Date: 28 December 2014
- On board: Vehicles: 222; Passengers: 417; Crew and personnel: 55
- Losses: 30 people (including 2 during salvage)

At 17:50 on 27 December 2014, Norman Atlantic departed Patras on a ferry run bound for Ancona where she was scheduled to arrive at 20:30 on 28 December. She made an intermediate stop at Igoumenitsa, departing there at 01:50 on 28 December 2014. At this time, the ship was thought to be carrying 222 vehicles, 417 passengers and 55 crew although later investigations would uncover the presence of at least six stowaways. She proceeded on her route which transited the Strait of Otranto 44 nautical miles (81 km) northwest of the island of Corfu and 33 nautical miles (61 km) northwest of the island of Othonoi in Greek territorial waters. The sea conditions were rough, with a strong south westerly wind blowing at up to 55 knots (28 m/s; 63 mph).

At about 05:15 a fire pre-alarm was activated on Deck 4, an open roll-on/roll-off cargo space. The second mate, who was in command at the time, sent a seaman to investigate the alarm but there was no sign of a fire, just fumes being emitted from a truck refrigeration unit. At 05:23 a full fire alarm was sounded by the automatic system, again on Deck 4, in an area directly below the passenger and crew accommodation on Deck 5. The captain, from his position on the bridge, was able to observe flames coming from the windows on Deck 4 and ordered the fire drencher system to be activated. Later investigation revealed that the drencher had been activated on Deck 3, rather than in the area of the fire perhaps due to confusing labelling on the valves.

At 05:38, the Norman Atlantic made its first distress call to the Brindisi Coastguard. As the vessel was in Greek waters, the Greek SAR organisation led the initial response, but at 09:00 local time the leadership of the rescue effort was handed over to the Italian Coast Guard. During the incident the ship would eventually drift into Italian waters.

The first Coast Guard vessel tasked to the rescue left Otranto at 06:00, arriving on scene at 08:20. In addition, 15 merchant ships that were in the area were requested to provide assistance. One of these, the Aby Jeannette, a bulk carrier, rescued 39 people from the Norman Atlantic's life rafts and brought them to Taranto, and the tanker Genmar Argus rescued a crewmember from the sea. The Italian ferry Cruise Europa rescued a further 69 passengers and brought them to Igoumenitsa. Sixteen helicopters and four fixed wing aircraft also assisted the rescue.

The fire rapidly destroyed the rescue boat, lifeboat, and rescue chute on the starboard side of the ship. Passengers gathered on the port side and began to embark on the lifeboat and life rafts, despite the captain not ordering an evacuation at this time. A group of 49 passengers escaped in the port side lifeboat. After being rescued, some passengers asserted that the order to abandon ship was not given until four hours after the fire had started. Despite their cabins filling with smoke, no alarm had sounded. They also stated that the crew of Norman Atlantic gave them little assistance.

The heat from the fire permeated the entire ship, even starting to melt people's shoes on the reception deck. Survivors described "scenes from hell" on board the burning ship, with the ship's crew overwhelmed by the crisis and jungle law prevailing rather than an orderly evacuation. Those in the lifeboat were rescued by the Singapore-registered container ship Spirit of Piraeus and landed at Bari, Italy. Several liferafts were also launched, but some of them capsized, causing the deaths by drowning or hypothermia of several occupants. Other people in the sea or in the rafts were rescued by helicopters.

Norman Atlantic on fire, with rescue efforts underway. Photo from the Italian Navy.

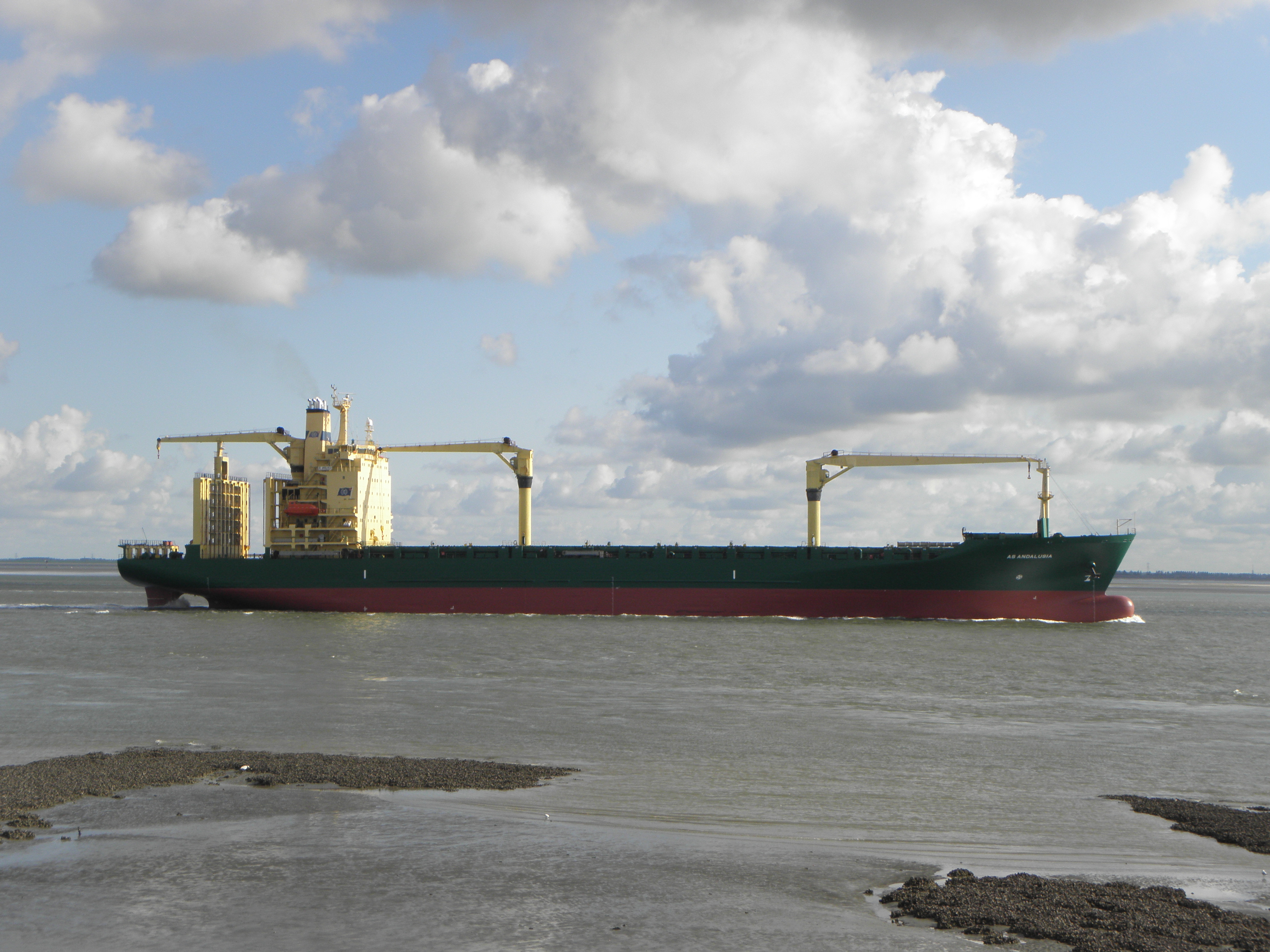
Spirit of Piraeus, which rescued the 49 people from the lifeboat, was previously named AS Andalucia, as seen in this 2011 photograph.

The rescue effort was hampered by the Norman Atlantic's loss of power. The firefighting tugboat Marietta Barretta was able to attach a line to the ferry and turn it into the wind, enabling helicopters to begin operating. Captain Giacomazzi was the last one to leave the ship at 2.50 pm.

=== Aftermath ===
At least twelve people were killed as a direct result of the fire, and an additional two Albanian tugboat crewmembers were killed during salvage operations on 30 December when a connecting cable snapped. Officials stated that one person died after jumping from the burning ship. Three of the rescued people who were on board the Norman Atlantic were Afghan illegal immigrants who stowed away in lorries in the hold. Among those killed was Ilia Kartozia, a Georgian Orthodox priest, who, according to an eyewitness, helped others to evacuate, but the rescuers failed to save him. His body was recovered off Lecce on 30 December 2014.

Norman Atlantic was towed to the port of Brindisi, Italy, by the Marietta Barretta and two additional tugs, Tenax and Asmara, arriving there on 2 January 2015. The ship was sequestered for the investigation. On 6 January, a lifeboat from the Norman Atlantic was found on a beach near Valona, Albania. The Norman Atlantic continued to burn in port for almost two weeks until 10 January 2015, when firefighters were finally able to enter the hull for inspection.

On 2 February 2015, just before the boat was due to be towed to Bari, a second body was discovered in the truck parking area. In the same days, the bodies of three people, presumably belonging to some of the missing, were found on the coast of Corfu and Apulia.

The damage to the ship was extensive enough that it was not economically to return her to service, so she would be written off. The hull plating and deck had been deformed, all communication and navigation equipment was destroyed and the accommodation and common areas were gutted. Additionally, the ingress of water during firefighting had wrecked the electrical equipment, including the emergency battery systems, the heating, and the ventilation systems.

=== Investigations ===
Italian authorities opened a criminal investigation into the fire. The investigation was intended to determine whether or not criminal negligence played a part in the fire. The ship had been inspected at Patras, Greece on 19 December; six serious deficiencies had been found, relating to emergency lighting, fire doors and lifesaving capacity on board the vessel. The owners had been served with a notice giving them fifteen days to remedy the deficiencies. On 2 January 2015 the prosecutor's office in Bari widened the investigation, and put two other crew members and two representatives of the Greek ferry line ANEK Lines, which chartered the Norman Atlantic, under investigation.

Rear Admiral John Lang, formerly Chief Inspector at Britain's Marine Accident Investigation Branch, said the emergency, under freezing stormy conditions at night "challenges many of the established conventions and wisdom on how a mass rescue should be conducted." He said that, in the course of the investigation, the right rather than the convenient conclusions should be drawn, adding "Rarely has the outcome of a comprehensive and thorough investigation been more important for improving safety at sea."

A Turkish passenger reported, as a possible cause, that illegal Afghan immigrants, who had boarded the ship concealed in a lorry, had lit a fire in the ship's garage to keep themselves warm. Another possible cause was sparks caused by trucks scraping the sides of the vessel.

Preliminary underwater inspections of the Norman Atlantic revealed that the water intake pipes of the fire sprinkler system were clogged with mussels; additional inspections were necessary to determine if this blockage contributed to the fire's spreading. Although the voyage data recorder (black box) had been recovered, still by mid-March no data have been extracted, apparently because the heat of the fire caused the plastic to melt onto the hard disk. Recordings of the Voyage data recorder published on 7 October 2015, say that the fire sprinkler system wasn't working correctly and instead of spraying water there was smoke coming from the system. The investigations also stated that there was a truck that had the engine working. Smoke was coming from the truck prior to the fire.

== Fate ==
Following the initial recovery and investigation, the ship was relocated to the port of Bari. In 2019 the ship left for Aliağa, Turkey to be scrapped.
