= SeaWind Line =

Finnish ferry company

- Industry: Passenger transportation Freight transportation
- Founded: 1988
- Defunct: 2010
- Headquarters: Turku, Finland
- Area served: Baltic Sea
- Website: www.seawind.fi

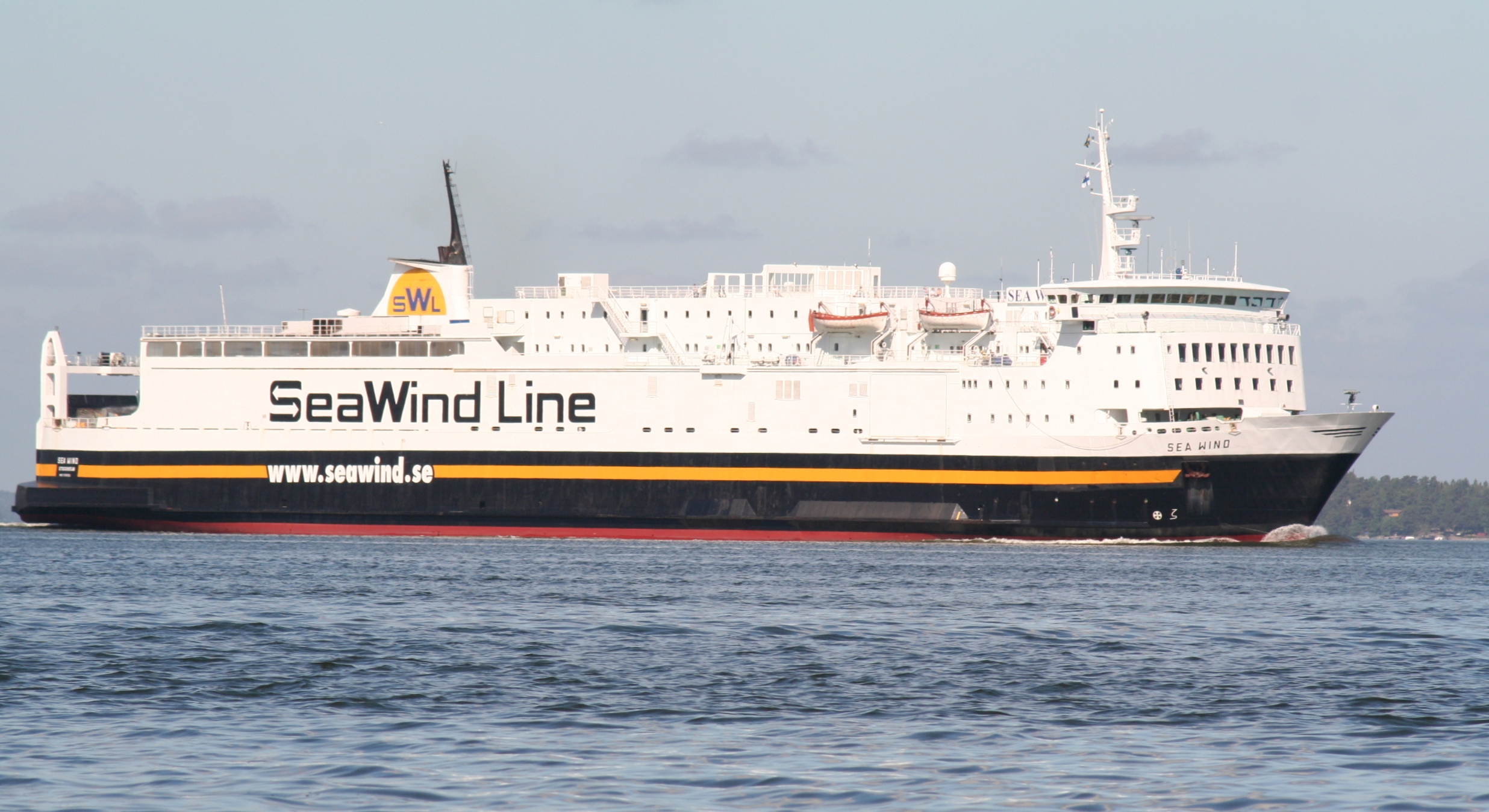
MS Sea Wind in the Stockholm archipelago

SeaWind Line was a subsidiary of the Finnish passenger shipping company Silja Line, later owned by the Estonian company Tallink. In 2010, the Sea Wind brand ceased to exist and the remaining ship, MS Sea Wind, was transferred to Tallink colours. MS Sea Wind is dedicated to cargo shipping only, operating also as a train ferry on the route Turku-Stockholm. The ship is one of the most important carriers of railway carriages between Finland and Sweden. However, according to Tallink CEO Enn Pant, the company currently has little interest in continuing the train-ferry traffic, as transporting trains generates less income than transporting other cargo.

SeaWind was founded in 1988 and started trafficking Stockholm–Turku with MS Sea Wind on 21 April 1989. In order to keep tax-free sales on board after the EU changed its tax free legislation, a stop at Långnäs was added to the route in 1999. In September 2002, MS Öresund was chartered by SeaWind Line, renamed MS Sky Wind and put on the Stockholm–Turku route along with MS Sea Wind. Between the years 2002 and 2005 SeaWind's MS Star Wind served on the route Helsinki–Tallinn. In April 2005 SeaWind Line purchased M/S Sky Wind.

In May 2005 the Helsinki–Tallinn route was terminated and Star Wind was moved to the Stockholm–Turku route and soon sold to Saaremaa Shipping Company. In May 2007 Sky Wind was sold to the Poland-based Unity Line and made its last trip for SeaWind Line in August 2007. Tallink Silja were negotiating for the purchase of the a ship to replace the Sky Wind, but due to low demand the decision was made not to bring in a replacement.

In January 2008, SeaWind Line ceased carrying passenger traffic. Coinciding with this, the ship no longer called at Långnäs as tax-free sales were no longer needed on board.

== Fleet ==
Ship	Built	Entered service	Route	Tonnage	Flag
MS Sea Wind	1972	1989	Turku–Långnäs–Stockholm	15,587 gross register tons (GRT)	Sweden

=== Former ships ===
Not a complete list.

Ship	Years in service	Tonnage
MS Fennia	1994–1995, 2000 (chartered)	10,515 GT
MS Sea Wind II; MS Gute	1995–1997 (chartered); 1998, 2003, 2006 (chartered)	7,616 GRT
MS Star Wind	1999–2005	6,111 GRT
MS Sky Wind	2002–2007	22,874 GRT

== See also ==
- SeaRail
