= The Big Necessity =

2008 book by Rose George

The Big Necessity: The Unmentionable World of Human Waste and Why It Matters
- First UK edition
- Author: Rose George
- Subject: Sanitation Hygiene
- Genre: Non-fiction
- Published: Portobello Books (UK); Metropolitan Books (US)
- Publication date: 2008
- ISBN: 9780805090833

The Big Necessity: The Unmentionable World of Human Waste and Why It Matters (published in the United Kingdom as The Big Necessity: Adventures in the World of Human Waste), written by Rose George, is a descriptive representation of the history, advancement, cultural variation, solutions, and international need of sanitation. This work, written for the purpose of global awareness of sanitation, highlights the current state of a global crisis. George gives insight into how sanitation around the world depicts the standard of living in that area. George uses her own personal experiences as examples to explain the sanitary conditions of areas around the world. Worldwide, 2.6 billion people (40% of the world's population) do not have sanitary facilities or systems to dispose of waste; Studies show that 95% of human waste is released into lakes, rivers, and ponds in developing countries. George discusses the lack of sanitation and toilets for the majority of the world and the resultant infection of water supplies causing 10% of the world’s communicable diseases, while access to a toilet adds 20 years to the average life.
