= A-Ships Management =

- Founded: 1990
- Headquarters: Athens, Greece
- Area served: Adriatic Sea
- Services: Passenger transportation, Freight transportation
- Website: www.a-ships.com

A-Ships Management SA formerly known as (European Seaways Inc.) is a Greek shipping company, owned by the Arkoumanis family. It operates ferry services between Italy, Albania and Greece.

== Routes ==
A-Ships Management operates the following routes across the Adriatic Sea:

- Brindisi - Vlore
- Brindisi – Corfu – Igoumenitsa (summer only)

== Fleet ==
European Seaways, and now A-Ships Management, have operated the following ferries:

=== Current fleet ===
Ship	Flag	Built	Entered service	Gross Tonnage	Length	Breadth	Passengers	Vehicles	Speed	Notes
Galaxy	Cyprus	1979	2017	10,553	127.6 m	19.5 m	900	280	17 knots	
Golden Bridge	Cyprus	1990	2018	26,463	186.5 m	24.8 m	1,500	500	23.5 knots	Chartered to GNV
Golden Carrier	Cyprus	1986	2025	22,874	188.9 m	23.1 m	TBD	TBD	18 knots	Chartered to GNV

=== Former ships ===
Ship	Years of service
European Spirit	1990-1995
European Glory	1990-1991
European Glory	1991-1997
European Star	1992-1994
Pearl William	1993
European Pride	1994-1997
Horizon (previously named Dignity and Ionis)	1996-2015
Apollon	2007-2010
Prince	2016
Bridge	2010-2017
Prince	2018-2021
Prince	2023-2024
