= MS Baltic Star =

Listed historical ship in Sweden

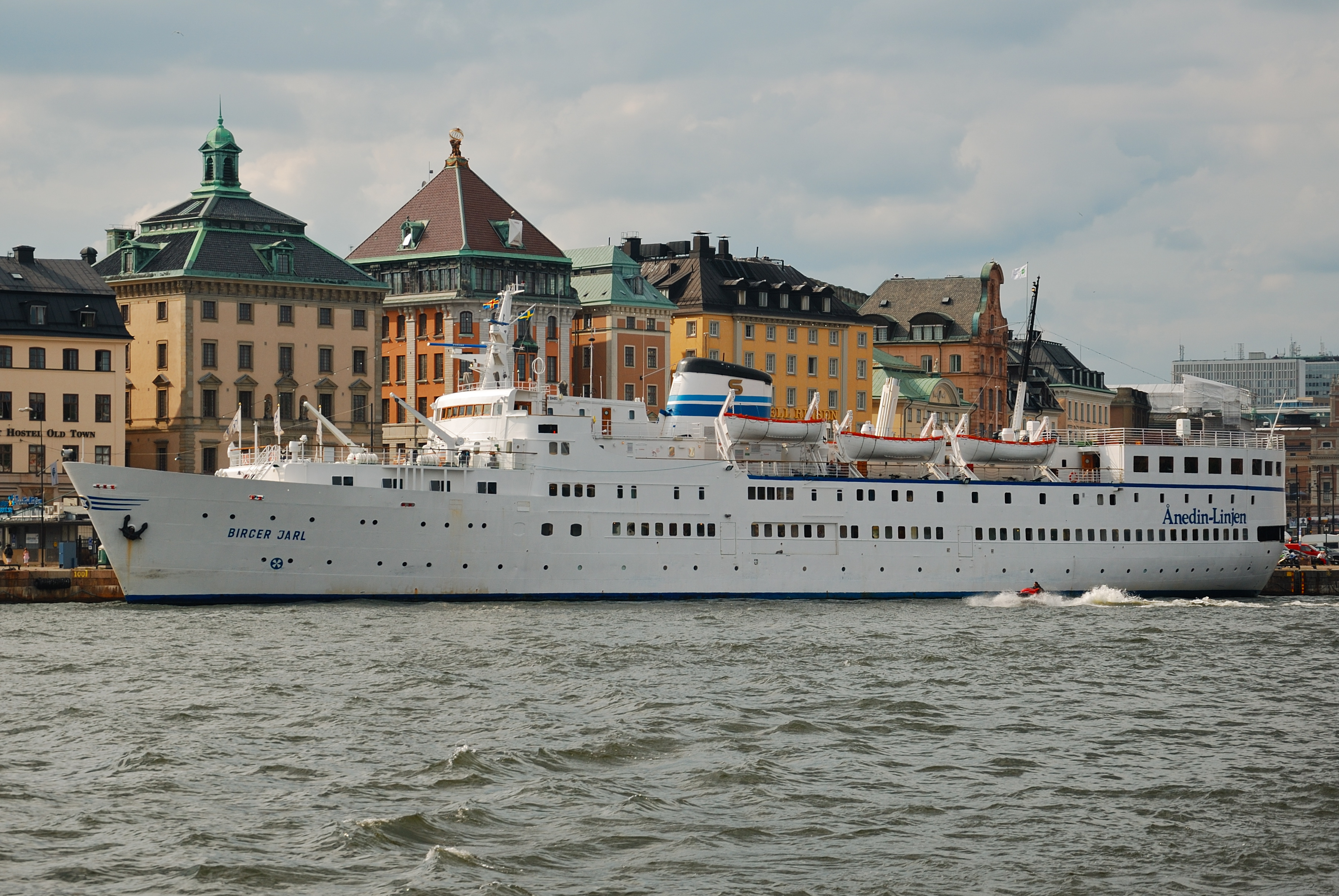
- Baltic Star as Birger Jarl at Skeppsbron, Stockholm

History
- Name: 1953–1973: SS Birger Jarl; 1973–1977: SS Bore Nord; 1978–1982: SS Baltic Star; 1982–2002: MS Baltic Star; 2002-2020: MS Birger Jarl; 2020-present: MS Baltic Star
- Owner: 1953–1973: Rederi AB Svea; 1973–1977: Jakob Lines; 1977: Steamship Company Bore; 1977–1978: Minicarriers; 1978–2002: Caribbean Shipping Company; 2002–2005: Rederi AB Allandia; 2005-2020: Rederi Birger Jarl AB; 2020 onwards: Rederi Hotell Fartyget BJ AB
- Operator: 1953–1970: Rederi AB Svea; 1970–1973: Silja Line; 1973–1977: Jakob Lines; 1978–2002: Ånedin Linjen
- Port of registry: 1953–1973: Stockholm, Sweden; 1973–1977: Jakobstad, Finland; 1977–1982: Turku, Finland; 1982–2002: Colón, Panama; 2002 onwards: Stockholm, Sweden
- Route: Stockholm—Mariehamn (as of 2009)
- Builder: Finnboda varv, Nacka, Sweden
- Yard number: 351
- Launched: 15 January 1953
- Christened: 15 January 1953 by Margit Hagander
- Completed: 1953
- Acquired: 4 June 1953
- Maiden voyage: 1953
- In service: 9 June 1953
- Identification: IMO number: 5044893
- Status: In service

General characteristics (as built, 1953)
- Type: passenger liner
- Tonnage: 3,236 GRT; 850 t DWT
- Length: 92.50 m (303 ft 6 in)
- Beam: 14.28 m (46 ft 10 in)
- Draught: 5.50 m (18 ft 1 in)
- Ice class: 1 B
- Installed power: Quadruple steam engine with exhaust steam turbo compressor, 3,300 hk
- Propulsion: 1 propeller
- Speed: 15 knots (27.78 km/h; 17.26 mph)
- Capacity: 600 passengers; 252 passenger berths; 30 cars (lo-lo)

General characteristics (as rebuilt, 1989)
- Type: cruise ship
- Tonnage: 3,564 GT; 864 t DWT
- Installed power: MAN–B&W 4SA diesel engine, 2,795 kW
- Speed: 15.50 knots (28.71 km/h; 17.84 mph)
- Capacity: 369 passengers; 369 passenger berths

MS Baltic Star is a cruise ship owned by Rederi Hotell Fartyget BJ AB that was operated on services between Stockholm, Sweden and Helsinki, Turku and most recently Mariehamn on Åland (Finland). She was built in 1953 as a passenger liner at Finnboda shipyard in Nacka, Sweden as SS Birger Jarl for Rederi AB Svea. In 1973 she was sold to Jakob Lines, was renamed SS Bore Nord and converted into a ferry. In 1978 she was bought back by the Ånedin Line (named after the 1970s British TV series The Onedin Line, also popular in Sweden) and was renamed SS Baltic Star. In 1982 the ship's original steam engines were replaced by diesel engines; the ship's prefix hence altered to MS. In 1989 the engines were again replaced by new diesels. In 2002 the ship reverted to the name Birger Jarl, and in 2020 back to the Baltic Star name.

== History ==
SS Birger Jarl was ordered by Rederi AB Svea from Finnboda shipyard in Nacka, Stockholm, where the keel of the ship was laid on 16 November 1951. She was launched on 15 January 1953 and named after the 13th-century Swedish statesman Birger Jarl. Her maiden voyage was made on 9 June 1953 to Helsinki, after which she started regular services between Stockholm – Helsinki and Stockholm – Turku.

SS Birger Jarl is one of the so-called Olympia ships, built to upgrade the ferry traffic for the Helsinki 1952 Summer Olympics. Her two sister ships, SS Aallotar and SS Bore III, entered service before the Olympics, but SS Birger Jarl was only delivered the year after.

Between 1973 and 1978 the ship sailed under the name SS Bore Nord and between 1978 and 2002 she was SS Baltic Star/MS Baltic Star. In 2002 she was given back her original name. In 2020, the ship again reverted to the name MS Baltic Star, under controversial circumstances.

The ship is a listed historic ship of Sweden.

== Career ==
- In 1973 the ship was owned by the Finnish ferry company Jakob Lines and was fitted with a ramp to load vehicles on the aft deck.
- In 1976 she was sold to Godby Shipping controlled by Åland Mikkola family. She was renamed Minisea, but the name was never actually painted on.
- In 1976 and 1977 she was laid up in the Oslofjord as a hotel ship.
- In 1978 she was acquired by Caribbean Shipping Co Inc, Panama who changed her name to S/S Baltic Star.
- In 1978 she was renovated in Turku and a 'skybar' and extra cabins were built on the aft deck.
- Since 1979 she has sailed on regular cruises between Stockholm and Mariehamn and sometimes on longer cruises in the Baltic Sea.
- On 31 May 1979 she collided with the berth in Mariehamn. The berth was damaged and a few small boats sunk. She became stuck between the berth and the vintage sailing ship SS Pommern, which also was damaged. After several hours the ships were separated and could be repaired. S/S Baltic Star departed for Stockholm one day late.
- In 1982 the steam engine was replaced by a MAN diesel of 2,900 hp.
- In 1988 the engine was replaced by a MAN diesel of 3,600 hp. Maximum speed increased to 16 knots.
- Ånedinlinjen has been using the Bookit reservations system for its reservations and ticket sales since 1997.
- In 2002 the ship sailed once again under the Swedish flag and under her original name, M/S Birger Jarl.

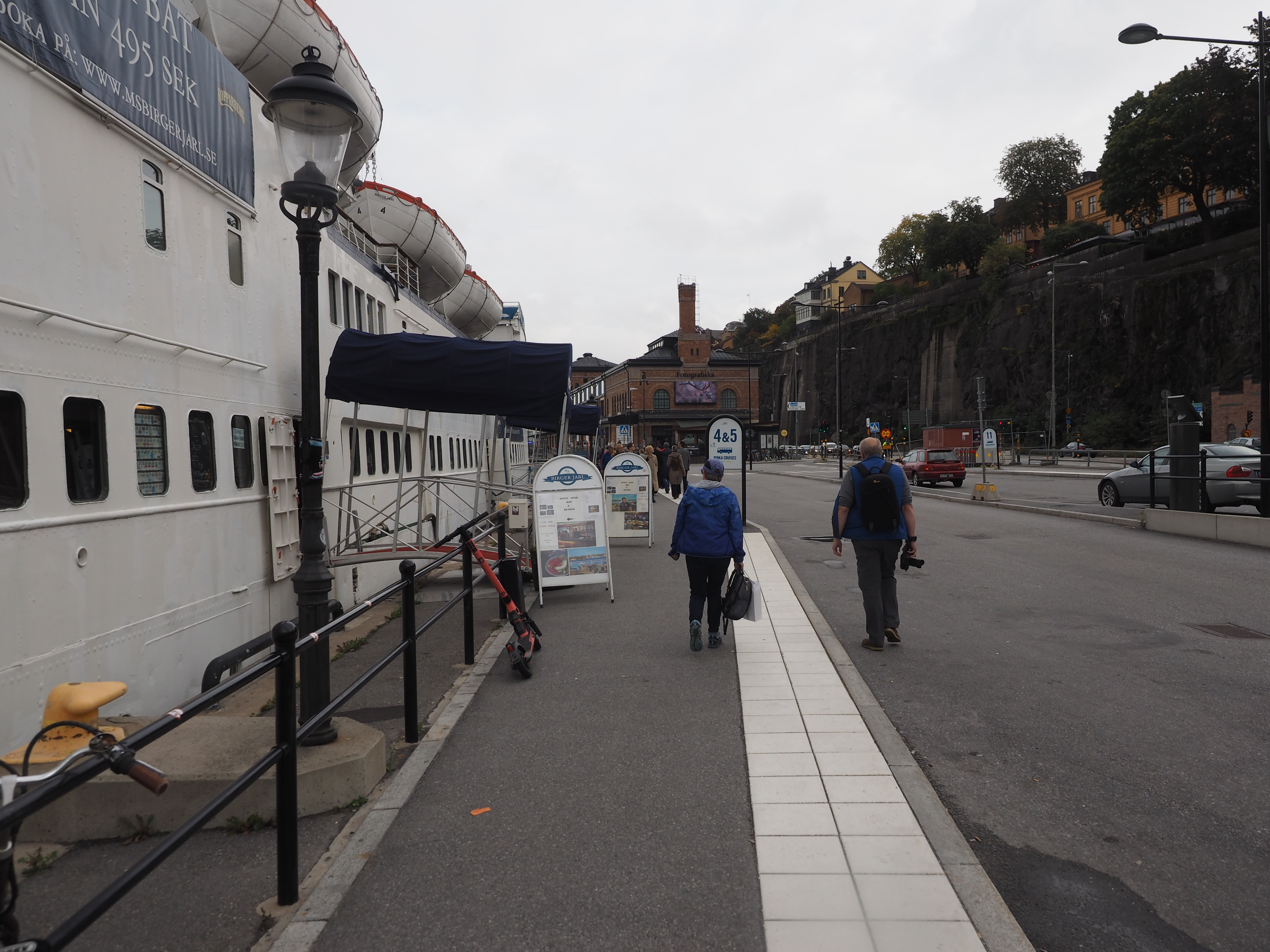
M/S Birger Jarl (left) moored in Södermalm serving as a floating hostel in September 2019.

- From June 2013 to 2019, the Birger Jarl was moored at the Ånedin Line terminal on Stockholm's Södermalm as a floating hostel
- In 2019, the ship was piloted to Timrå and back to Stockholm, and in April 2020, was piloted again to Timrå despite lacking permits. In August 2022 the vessel was piloted from Timrå to Lunde.
