= MS Fennia =

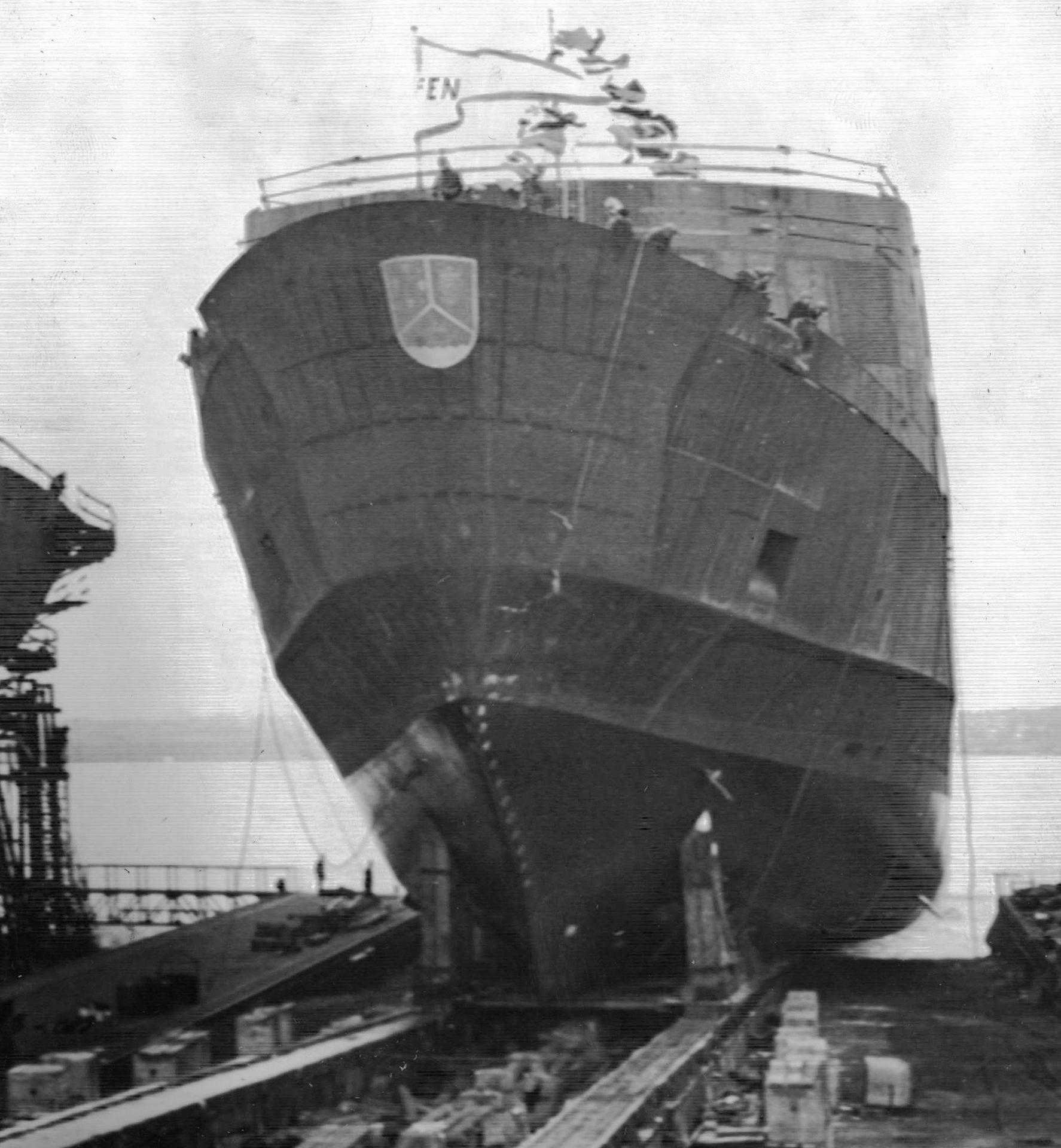
- The launch of Fennia in October 1965

History
- Name: 1966–2001: Fennia; 2001–2007: Casino Express; 2007–2009: C. Express; 2009–2010: Onyx; 2010: Kaptain Boris
- Owner: 1966–1970: Siljavarustamo; 1970–1984: Svea Line (Finland); 1984–1985: Jakob Lines; 1985–1990: Rederi Ab Sally; 1990–1991: Svea Line (Finland); 1991–2001: Silja Line; 2001–2007: RG Line; 2007–2010: Attar Construction Ltd; 2010: Red Line Shipping Ltd
- Operator: 1966–1970: Siljavarustamo; 1970–1978: Silja Line; 1978: Sessan Linjen; 1978–1979: Silja Line; 1979: SAGA Linjen; 1979–1982: Silja Line; 1983: B&I Line; 1983–1984: Silja Line; 1984–1985: Jacob Lines; 1986–1992: Vaasanlaivat-Vasabåtarna; 1992–1993: Baltic Line; 1993–1994: SeaWind Line; 1994–2000: Silja Line; 2000: SeaWind Line; 2001–2005: RG Line; 2005–2009: Laid up
- Port of registry: 1966–1975: Turku, Finland; 1975–1983: Mariehamn, Finland; 1983–1994: Vaasa, Finland; 1994–2002: Mariehamn, Finland; 2002–2007: Umeå, Sweden; 2007–2010: Basseterre, Saint Kitts and Nevis; 2010: Freetown, Sierra Leone
- Ordered: 7 July 1964
- Builder: Öresundsvarvet, Landskrona, Sweden
- Yard number: 201
- Laid down: 7 April 1965
- Launched: 28 October 1965
- Christened: 28 October 1965
- Acquired: 27 April 1966
- Maiden voyage: 7 May 1966
- In service: 7 May 1966
- Out of service: 14 August 2005
- Identification: Call sign: 9LY2253; IMO number: 6600462; MMSI number: 341408000
- Fate: Scrapped at Gadani Ship Breaking Yard in 2010

General characteristics (as built)
- Tonnage: 6,178 GRT; 2,666 NRT; 1,500 DWT
- Length: 128.40 m (421.3 ft)
- Beam: 19.63 m (64.4 ft)
- Draught: 5.00 m (16.40 ft)
- Ice class: 1A
- Installed power: 4 × 9 cyl Ruston-Hornsby ATCM diesels (4 × 2,190 hp)
- Speed: 18 knots (33 km/h; 21 mph)
- Capacity: 1,200 passengers; 300 passenger berths; 225 cars

General characteristics (after refit)
- Tonnage: 10,515 GT; 3,921 NT; 1,500 DWT
- Length: 128.88 m (422 ft 10 in)
- Beam: 19.67 m (64 ft 6 in)
- Draught: 5.15 m (16 ft 11 in)
- Ice class: 1A
- Installed power: 4 × 9 cyl MaK 9M453AK diesels (4 × 2,207 kW)
- Speed: 18.5 knots (34.3 km/h; 21.3 mph)
- Capacity: 1,200 passengers; 521 passenger berths; 265 cars

MS Fennia was a car-passenger ferry built in 1966 for Siljavarustamo / Siljarederiet. During her long career Fennia also sailed for Jakob Lines and Vaasanlaivat / Vasabåtarna, and spent short times chartered to Sessan Linjen, SAGA Linjen, B&I Line, Baltic Line and SeaWind Line. In 2001 the ship was sold to RG Line and renamed Casino Express.

In 2007, after being laid up since 2005, the ship was sold to Attar Construction Ltd and renamed C. Express. Concerned about the hazardous materials inside the ship, the Finnish Environment Institute issued a transport ban on the vessel to prevent her from being moved for scrapping in inappropriate conditions. The ban was lifted in July 2009 and the ship, renamed Onyx, left Finland in late 2009. In April 2010 the ship changed hands again and the new owner, Red Line Shipping Ltd, renamed her Kaptain Boris and sailed her directly to Gadani Beach, Pakistan, where she was beached for scrapping on 8 May 2010.

== History ==
=== 1966–1984 ===
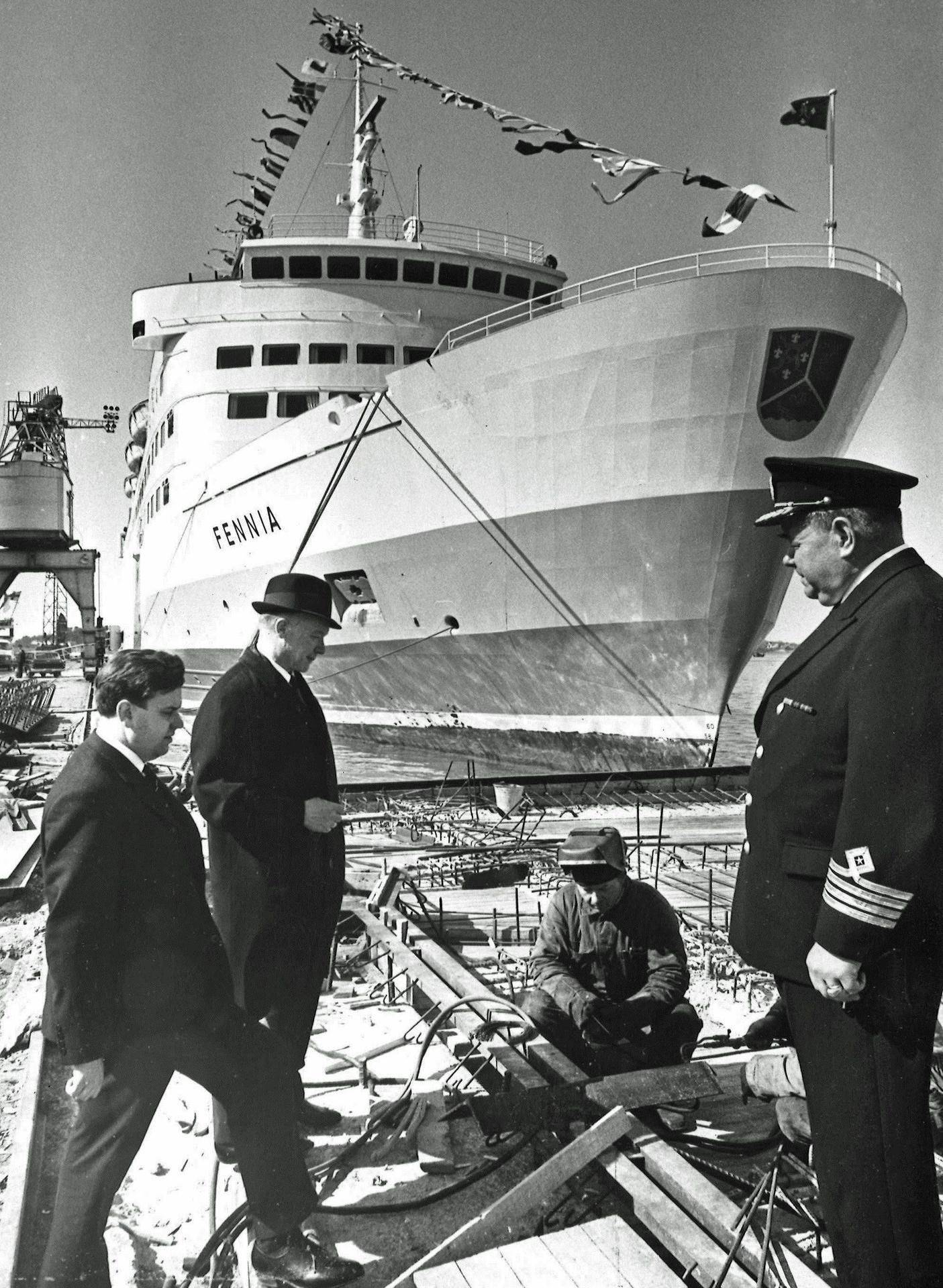
Fennia at Turku in 1966

In the 1960s Siljavarustamo / Siljarederiet (daughter company of Finland Steamship Company (FÅA), Steamship Company Bore and Rederi AB Svea) started traffic between Finland and Sweden for the first time on genuine car-passenger ferries, the first of these being delivered in 1961. In 1964 a new, larger ferry was ordered from Öresundsvarvet in Landskrona, Sweden, for service between Turku and Stockholm. The brand-new ferry, christened Fennia, made her maiden voyage on 7 May 1966. She was at the time the largest ferry in traffic between Finland and Sweden.

Already in the same year Fennia faced problems when she ran aground hear Bogskär on 16 October 1966. On the following day cars and trucks carried on board were transferred on board her fleetmates Holmia and Nordia, and on 18 October she sailed with the help of a tugboat to Finnboda shipyard in Stockholm for repairs. The repairs took quite some time and it was not until 17 December that Fennia returned to traffic.

In spring 1968, an American company made an offer to buy Fennia, but it was turned down. In June 1970 the ship's ownership passed to Svea Line (Finland), when the ownership of Silja Line was reorganised and the former joint daughter company became a marketing company for FÅA, Bore and Svea. In early 1971, Fennia was painted in Silja Line's new all-white livery. During the same year she suffered from two accidents, first on 10 March when she accidentally rammed the quay in Turku in dense fog, suffering serious damage to her bow, and the second time on 14 December when she collided with the Polish freighter Rusalka in the Turku archipelago. This time damages were minimal.

After the partner companies of Silja Line took delivery of three new large ferries for Helsinki–Stockholm and Turku–Stockholm routes in 1975, Fennia spent portions of the following years either laid up or chartered to other companies. Between January and April 1975 she was docked in Helsingör, where her engines were changed to more powerful MaK diesels. Between July and October of the same year the ship sailed on the Turku–Åland–Norrtälje (Sweden) route. In June 1976, Fennia became the first ship to visit Valmet's new shipyard in Kotka. In October 1977 she was laid up in Turku until the Swedish Sessan Linjen company chartered her for traffic from Gothenburg (Sweden) to Travemünde (Germany) and Frederikshavn (Denmark) between January and March 1978. After the charter she was briefly laid up again, until in late April she returned to Turku–Stockholm traffic. She was again chartered off for the duration of January 1979, when she sailed between Malmö (Sweden) and Travemünde for SAGA Linjen.

After the charter, Fennia stayed on the Turku–Stockholm traffic until November 1982, when she was laid up and put up for sale. No buyer was immediately forthcoming, and for the summer season 1983 she was chartered to the Irish B&I Line for traffic between Pembroke–Cork. Fennia was found to be ill-suited for this traffic as she had no stabilisers. Finally in November 1983 Fennia was sold, to the Finnish Jakob Lines for delivery in 1984. Before her sale, Fennia served for Silja Line one more time, this time on the Helsinki–Stockholm route in January and February 1984 when the route's normal ships were being docked.

=== 1984–2000 ===
In May 1984, Fennia began service with Jakob Lines. Initially she was set on the new Jakobstad (Finland) – Örnsköldsvik (Sweden) route, later also on Jakob Lines' traditional Jakobstad–Skellefteå route. On 28 November two passengers were injured during a heavy storm. Fennia was from the beginning too large a ship for Jakob Lines and already in December 1985 she was sold to Vaasanlaivat / Vasabåtarna (in exchange for Fenno Express and 19.1 million Finnish marks). Between January and April 1986 Fennia was heavily rebuilt at Wärtsilä Turku shipyard. Her terraced rear superstructure was built in with cabins, the midship dummy funnel / observation lounge was removed, the two actual funnels to the rear were given a sleeker appearance and to support the additions rear sponsons were added.

On 25 March 1986, Fennia began her service for Vaasanlaivat / Vasabåtarna on the Vaasa (Finland) – Sundsvall (Sweden) route. During her service with Vaasanlaivat She also served on the Vaasa–Umeå, Jakobstad–Umeå and Jakobstad–Skellefteå routes (the latter two after Vaasanlaivat bought Jakob Lines in 1989). In the beginning of the year 1990 Vaasanlaivat changed its name to Wasa Line. On 12 November 1991 an accident in the engine room resulted in 14 tons of fuel oil leaking into the sea outside Örnsköldsvik.

Between April and October 1992, Fennia served on the routes Vaasa–Umeå, Jakobstad–Umeå, Jakobstad–Skellefteå and Kokkola–Skellefteå. In October 1992, she was chartered to Baltic Line for traffic from Norrköping (Sweden) to Riga (Latvia). In the beginning of 1993 Wasa Line was merged into Silja Line. Fennia's charter to Baltic Line ended in March 1993 and in May of the same year she returned to her previous routes across the Kvarken, now back in Silja Line colours. In 1994 the line from Kokkola was terminated. For the winter season 1994–1995, Fennia was chartered to Silja Line's subsidiary SeaWind Line for traffic on her old route Turku–Stockholm. After the end of the charter in May 1995, Fennia again returned to traffic across the Kvarken, sailing Vaasa–Umeå during the winter season and a varied itinerary from Vaasa and Jakobstad during the summer.

In 1997 the Kokkola–Skellefteå route was reopened, although traffic was limited to weekends during the summer season. In 1998 the traffic from Kokkola was again discontinued (this time for good), but Fennia continued to traffic on the Vaasa–Umeå, Jakobstad–Umeå and Jakobstad–Skellefteå routes. A special Jakobstand–Luleå cruise was also made during the summer. In May and June 1999 Fennia trafficked from Jakobstad for the last time, the end of tax-free sales in intra-EU traffic in July 1999 meant that the traffic from Jakobstad was no longer profitable. The end of Tax-Free sales also affected the Vaasa–Umeå route badly, and on 23 September 1999 Fennia was laid up and put for sale.

Pending a potential charter to a Turkish company, Fennia was docked in May 2000 and all Silja Line markings were painted over. The charter didn't materialise, but she was chartered to SeaWind Line between June and August of the same year as a freight-carrying ship. At the end of the charter Fennia returned to Vaasa for another lay-up.

=== 2001–2007 ===
In February 2001, Fennia was sold to the Finnish RG Line for traffic between Vaasa and Umeå (RG Line had won the bid for subsidiaries from the Finnish State for that route). On 1 May 2001, Fennia was renamed for the first time during her career, into Casino Express. RG Line planned to gain additional income from the onboard casino, but this proved highly unpopular and was removed during the same year.

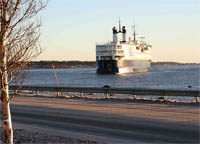
MS Casino Express grounded outside Hillskär, November 2004.

It soon became evident that in the new situation Casino Express was too large a ship to operate profitably in year-round traffic, even with state subsidies. In 2002 RG Line planned to register the ship as a freighter during the winter season to cut costs, but the plan fell through as the ship was not in a good enough condition to be approved as a freighter in the Finnish ship registry. As a result, the ship was reregistered into Umeå in September 2002. In January 2003 the ship docked in Kopli, Estonia. After the ship returned to traffic, traces of asbestos — that should have been removed before the ship returned to traffic — were found on her car deck. In February and March of the same year difficult ice conditions led to cancellation of several departures.

On 24 November 2004, Casino Express was grounded while entering the port of Umeå due to high winds. All passengers and some of the crew were evacuated during the following night, and during the following three days all cars carried on board were transported to shore. On 5 December the ship was finally refloated and sailed to Tallinn, Estonia for repairs. After repairs were completed, Casino Express resumed traffic in May 2005. However, by this time RG Line had another ship, RG 1 in traffic, and it was decided that in August, at the end of the 2005 summer season, Casino Express would be laid up and put for sale.

=== 2007–2009 ===
On 8 July 2007 the ship was reported to have been sold for scrap, but two days later it was reported that the ship had instead been sold to new owners from St. Vincent and the Grenadines who plan to use the ship for traffic around the Caribbean. She was renamed C. Express, but remained laid up in Vaasa. On 13 July 2007 the Finnish Environment Institute classified the ship as hazardous waste and issued a transport ban on C. Express to prevent the ship from being scrapped in inappropriate conditions due to large quantities of asbestos and PCB found on board. The ban would remain in place until certain knowledge about the future use of the vessel would be obtained or the new owner applied for a waste transport permit.

While remaining laid up at Vaasa, water started to leak into C. Express's engine room in the early morning of 8 March 2009. The leak could be contained by the ship's three-man crew and the local fire brigade before a major accident could occur. The cause for the accident was believed to be water pipes on board that had broken due to freezing during the winter which started leaking as the weather got warmer. On 8 March a representative of the Finnish Maritime Administration who had inspected the ship stated that her engines are not in working condition, and if she remains laid up in Vaasa another winter she is likely to sink due to freeze damage and cause notable damage to the environment due to various hazardous substances, including fuel oil, that is still on board.

Over the years the owner presented several plans for the future use of the vessel, including conversion to a casino or accommodation ship. In July 2009 the Finnish Environmental Institute lifted the transport ban after the owner proved that the ship would not be sold for scrap, but instead would be time chartered to International Shipping Bureau in Dubai. Repairing of the engines and other machinery damaged by the water leak started soon afterwards and the ship was renamed Onyx in August 2009. After passing inspection by the Finnish Maritime Administration and a successful sea trial in late October the ship left Finland on 3 November 2010 with two of her four main engines running, reportedly heading for a shipyard in Turkey for further repairs.

=== 2009–2010 ===
After leaving Finland, Onyx stopped at Portland, England, on 12 November 2009 and left on 21 November, but ran into problems soon afterwards when the reduction gear broke down in heavy weather and the ship's only working propeller stopped. The ship, damaged by the storm, was towed to the port of Brest, France, where the French maritime officials were afraid that the owner would abandon the ship, leaving her to be scrapped at their expense. French environmental associations such as Robin des Bois blamed Finnish environmental officials for letting Onyx leave Finland in the first place, claiming that it was certain that the ship would be scrapped and demanded the ship to be returned to Finland. The crew told the press that they hadn't received their pay for two months, resulting in the French officials detaining the ship, and most of them refused to continue journey before all four engines were in working order. The captain also admitted that the ship was heading for a scrap yard in Bangladesh instead of a ship yard in Turkey and was reportedly fired afterwards, but a representative of the shipping company later denied this. However, the only shipyard in Iskenderun, Turkey, where the owner claimed the ship would be heading for repairs, announced that they were not expecting Onyx to arrive there. The destination was subsequently changed to a shipyard in Piraeus, Greece, and the ship left Brest on 10 February 2010, heading for Gibraltar.

Due to bad weather the ship took shelter in Lisbon, Portugal, on 16 February 2010. The destination was changed to Limassol, Cyprus, and Onyx continued her journey on 3 March 2010, stopping at Malta for refueling. However, the ship passed Cyprus and arrived in Port Said, Egypt to wait for transit through the Suez Canal. The ship lowered her anchor outside Port Rashid in Dubai on 17 April 2010 where she was sold to Red Line Shipping Ltd and renamed Kaptain Boris. On 7 May 2010 the Finnish Environment Institute admitted that the ship might be heading for a scrapyard and is considering further actions against the new owners if it looks like the institute was deliberately deceived.

The new owner sailed the ship to Gadani Beach, Pakistan, where she was beached for scrapping on 8 May 2010. On 19 May 2010 the Finnish Environment Institute decided to contact the previous owner and Pakistani officials concerning the scrapping of the ship, and deliver the latter information about the hazardous materials inside the vessel.

== See also ==
- GTS Finnjet – another Finnish ship that recently brought the environmental problems of ship breaking in poor countries into headlines
