= Ippotis =

Roll-on roll-off ferry

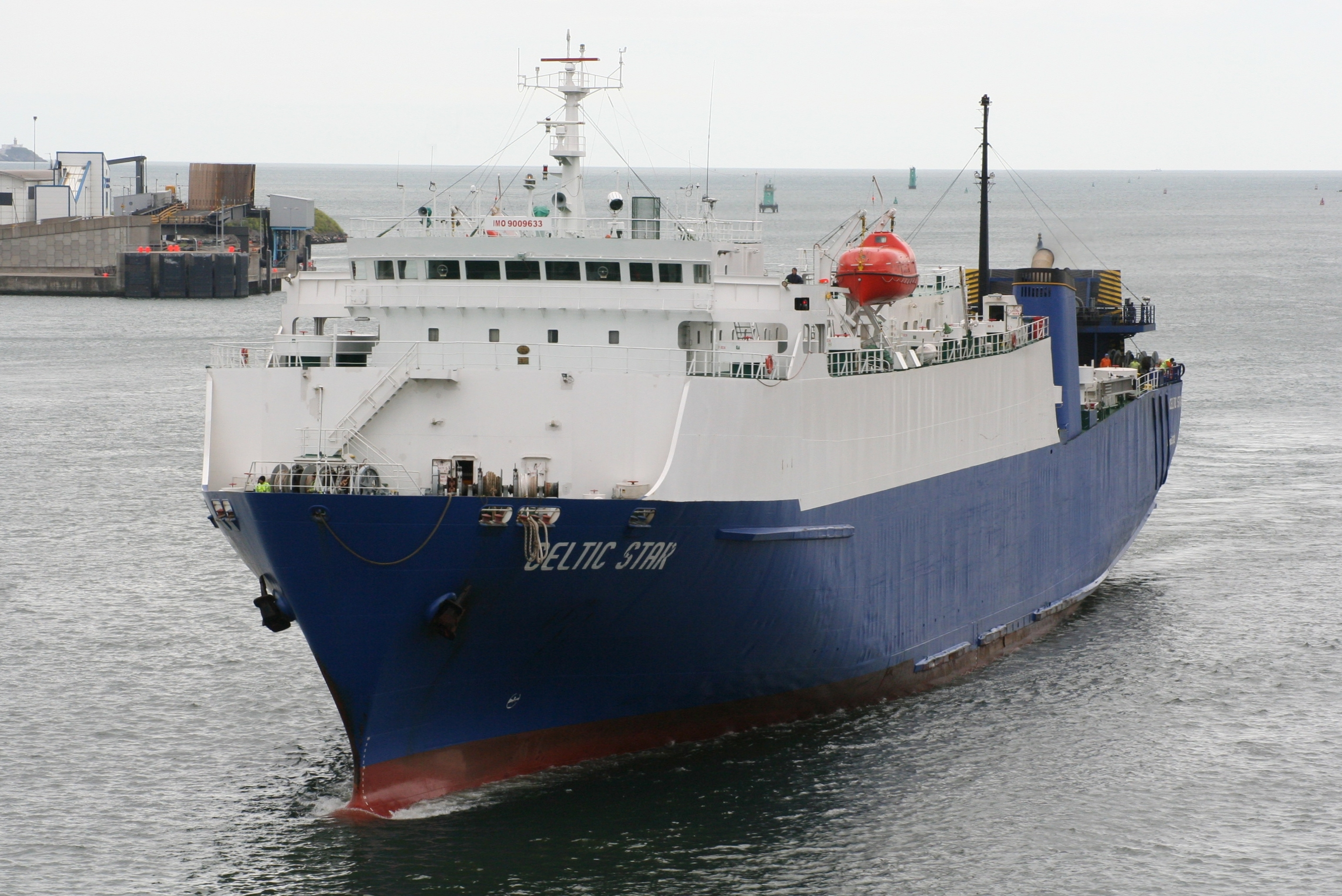
- Celtic Star entering Dublin

History
- Name: Ippotis (2010 – 2014); Celtic Star (2006–2010); Northern Star (2002–2006); Celtic Star (1999–2002); Loon-Plage (1998–1999); Ioalaos (1998); Kosei Maru (1991–1998)
- Owner: Eptanisos Maritime (1998 – 2013); Kanko Kisen KK (1991–1998)
- Operator: NEL Lines (2010 – 2013); P&O Irish Sea (2008–2010); Seatruck Ferries (2007–2008); Celtic Link Ferries (2006–2007); CoTuNav (2004–2006); Dart Line (2003–2004); P&O Irish Sea (1999–2003); DFDS Tor Line (1999); East Coast Ferries (1998–1999); Kanko Kisen KK (1991–1998)
- Port of registry: Japan (1991–1999); Limassol, Cyprus (1999 – 2014)
- Builder: Kanda Zosencho K.K., Kawajiri, Japan
- Yard number: 337
- Launched: 1 August 1991
- Identification: IMO number: 9009633; Callsign P3CUB
- Fate: Scrapped at Aliağa, Turkey 2014

General characteristics
- Tonnage: 11,086 GT
- Length: 136 m (446 ft 2 in)
- Beam: 20.50 m (67 ft 3 in)
- Draught: 6.70 m (22 ft 0 in)
- Installed power: 13,240 kilowatts (17,760 hp)
- Propulsion: 2 × Pielstick diesel engines
- Speed: 20.8 knots (38.5 km/h; 23.9 mph)
- Capacity: 12 passengers, 53 trailers

Ippotis was a roll-on/roll-off ferry owned and operated by Eptanisos Maritime on the Ibiza–Barcelona route.

== History ==
Ippotis was launched in 1991 as the Kosei Maru for Kanko Kisen KK.

- 1998 she was sold to Strintzis Lines and renamed Ioalaos.
- Later in 1998 she was renamed Loon-Plage and sold to East Coast Ferries.
- 1999 she was sold to DFDS Tor Line, renamed Celtic Star and put into service on the Rotterdam–Immingham route.
- April 1999, she was sold to P&O Irish Sea Lines for service on the Liverpool–Dublin route. Celtic Star was reflagged to Cyprus in May 1999.
- 2002 she was renamed Northern Star and transferred to the Larne–Liverpool route.
- 2003; sold to Dart Line for service on the Dartford–Vlissingen route.
- 2004; sold to CoTuNav Tunisian Ferries for service on the Tunis–Livorno route.
- 2006; sold to Celtic Link Ferries and renamed Celtic Star. She was used on the Dublin–Liverpool route.
- 2007; acquired by Seatruck Ferries, remaining on the Dublin–Liverpool route.
- 2008; Celtic Star was chartered to P&O Irish Sea, remaining on the Liverpool–Dublin route.

In 2014 Ippotis scrapped at Aliağa, Turkey.

== Incidents ==
Shortly after entering service with East Coast, Celtic Star ran aground.

On 30 November 2006, eight trailers were washed overboard on a crossing from Dublin to Liverpool.

On 1 February 2010, Celtic Star came into contact with a buoy in the Mersey estuary.
