= Jakob Lines =

Defunct Finnish ferry operator

- Industry: Passenger transportation
- Founded: 1969
- Defunct: 1991
- Fate: Acquired by Wasa Line
- Headquarters: Jakobstad, Finland
- Area served: Gulf of Bothnia

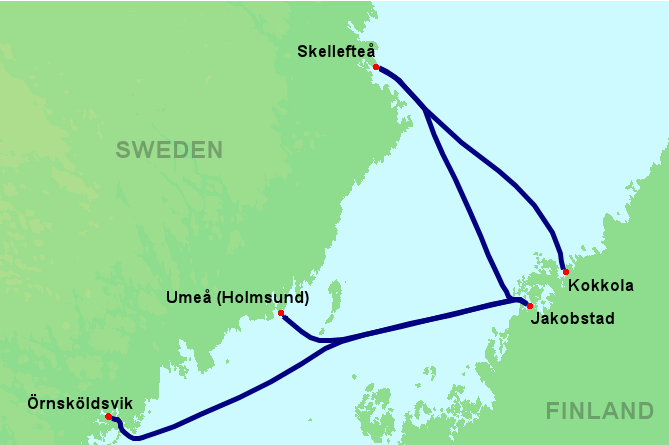
Jakob Lines's routes over the years

Jakob Lines was a ferry operator based in Jakobstad (Pietarsaari), Finland. The company was established in 1969 by the city of Jakobstad. It operated routes between Jakobstad and Kokkola (Karleby) in Finland, and Skellefteå, Umeå, and Örnsköldsvik in Sweden.

Jakob Lines' first ship M/S Nordek made its first voyage for the company on September 16, 1969, on the route between Jakobstad and Umeå. The company usually operated one or two ferries at a time and in total the company operated twelve different ferries, ten of which the company owned while two were chartered.

After the company was sold in 1991, the traffic was operated by the buyer Vasabåtarna. Shortly after Vasabåtarna acquired Jakob Lines, Vasabåtarna was merged with Silja Line. Silja Line gradually reduced the traffic from Jakobstad and Kokkola. Due to a part of the deal when Vasabåtarna bought Jakob Lines, Silja was obliged to maintain summer traffic from Jakobstad until tax-free sales were abolished on intra-EU travel in 1999.

== Fleet ==
- M/S Nordek (1969–1973)
- S/S Bore II (1971–1972, chartered)
- S/S Bore III (1972, Scrapped in 1982.)
- S/S Bore Nord (1973–1976, Originally named SS Birger Jarl. Renamed MS Baltic Star in 2020 and is serving as a floating hostel.)
- M/S Wasa Express (1974, marketing name: Nord Express)
- M/S Achilleus (1976, chartered)
- S/S Borea (1977–1983, serves as a Museum and hotel ship as of 2010.)
- M/S Polar Express (1982–1984)
- M/S Fennia (1983–1985, Broken up in 2010.)
- M/S Fenno Express (1985–1989)
- M/S Botnia Express (1989–1991, marketing name: Polar Princess. Beached for scrap in Alang, India in 2021.)
- M/S Fenno Star (1990–1991).
