= Celtic Link Ferries =

- Type: Subsidiary
- Industry: Passenger transportation Freight transportation
- Founded: 2005
- Defunct: 31 March 2014
- Fate: Merged into Stena's operations
- Successor: Stena Line
- Headquarters: Rosslare, Ireland
- Area served: Celtic Sea
- Key people: Denis O'Flaherty (Chairman)
- Parent: Stena Line
- Website: www.celticlinkferries.com

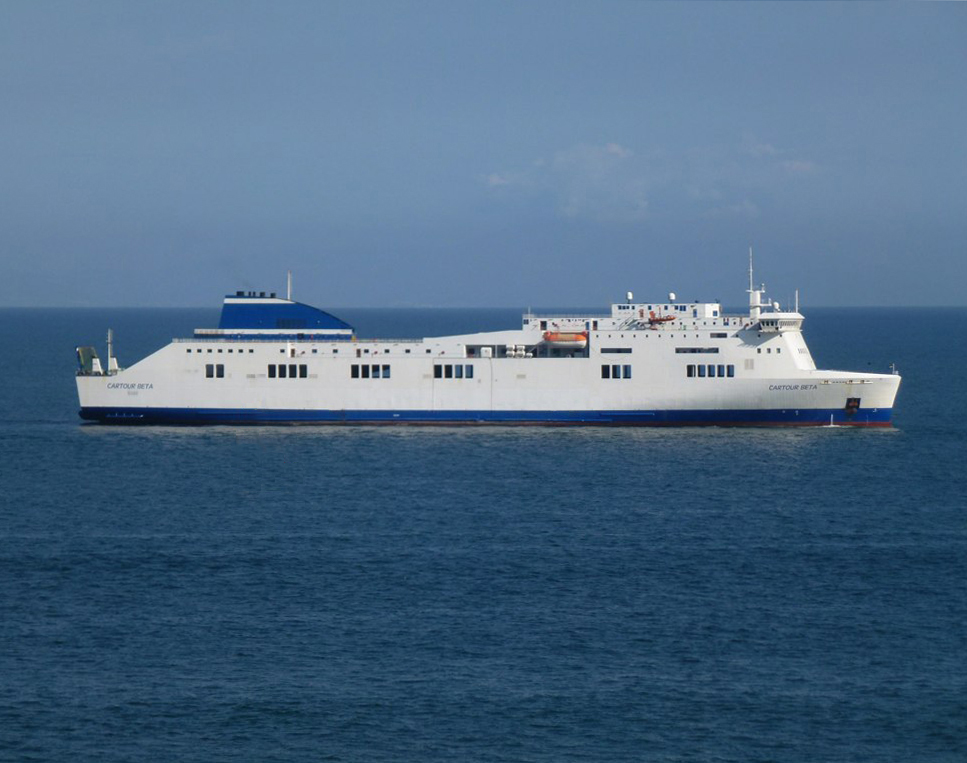
Celtic Horizon

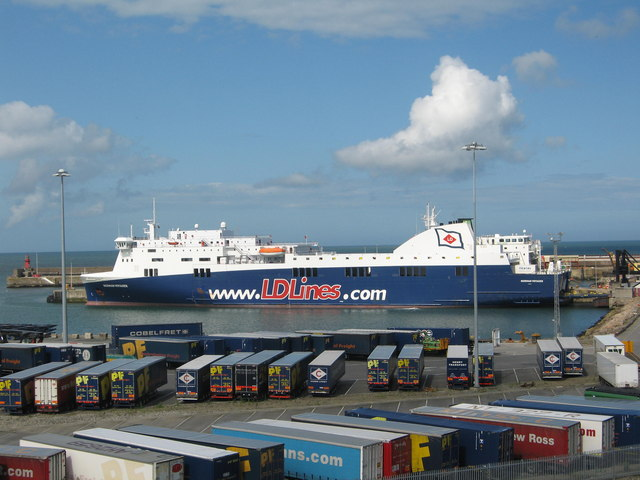
Norman Voyager at Rosslare

Celtic Link Ferries was an Irish ferry company which used to operate a passenger and freight roll-on/roll-off service between Rosslare and Cherbourg. Celtic Link Ferries ceased operating in February 2014 with Stena Line taking over its route.

== History ==
Celtic Link Ferries began operations in 2005 following the withdrawal of P&O Irish Sea from the Rosslare–Cherbourg route.

On 4 October 2009 Celtic Link Ferries chartered Norman Voyager from LD Lines.

On 19 November 2009 the Norman Voyager was detained in Portsmouth by the Maritime and Coastguard Agency when the crew failed a basic test of emergency procedures.

In December the same year the same vessel was involved in the rescue of three fishermen following the MV Alam Pintar and FV Etoile des Ondes collision. A report stated:

"Exemplary seamanship was demonstrated by the actions of the officers and crew of Norman Voyager in immediately reporting the flares to Jobourg MRCC and then proceeding, without question, to the assistance of the vessel in distress. The conduct of the rescue was safe, efficient and in the best traditions of the merchant navy."

On 26 February 2014 it was announced that Stena Line would acquire the Celtic Link ferry service.

== Fleet ==
Celtic Link Ferries last operated one vessel.

Name	Built	Tonnage	Passengers	Notes
Celtic Horizon	2006	27,522 GT	972	

The ship was re-christened the Stena Horizon.

=== Former vessels ===
- Norman Voyager – Returned to LD Lines
- Diplomat – chartered to Marine Express, Puerto Rico
- Celtic Mist – renamed Saronic Star, chartered to Cotunav
- Celtic Star – sold to Seatruck Ferries
- Celtic Sun – sold to Seatruck Ferries
