= GNV Sealand =

2008 ship

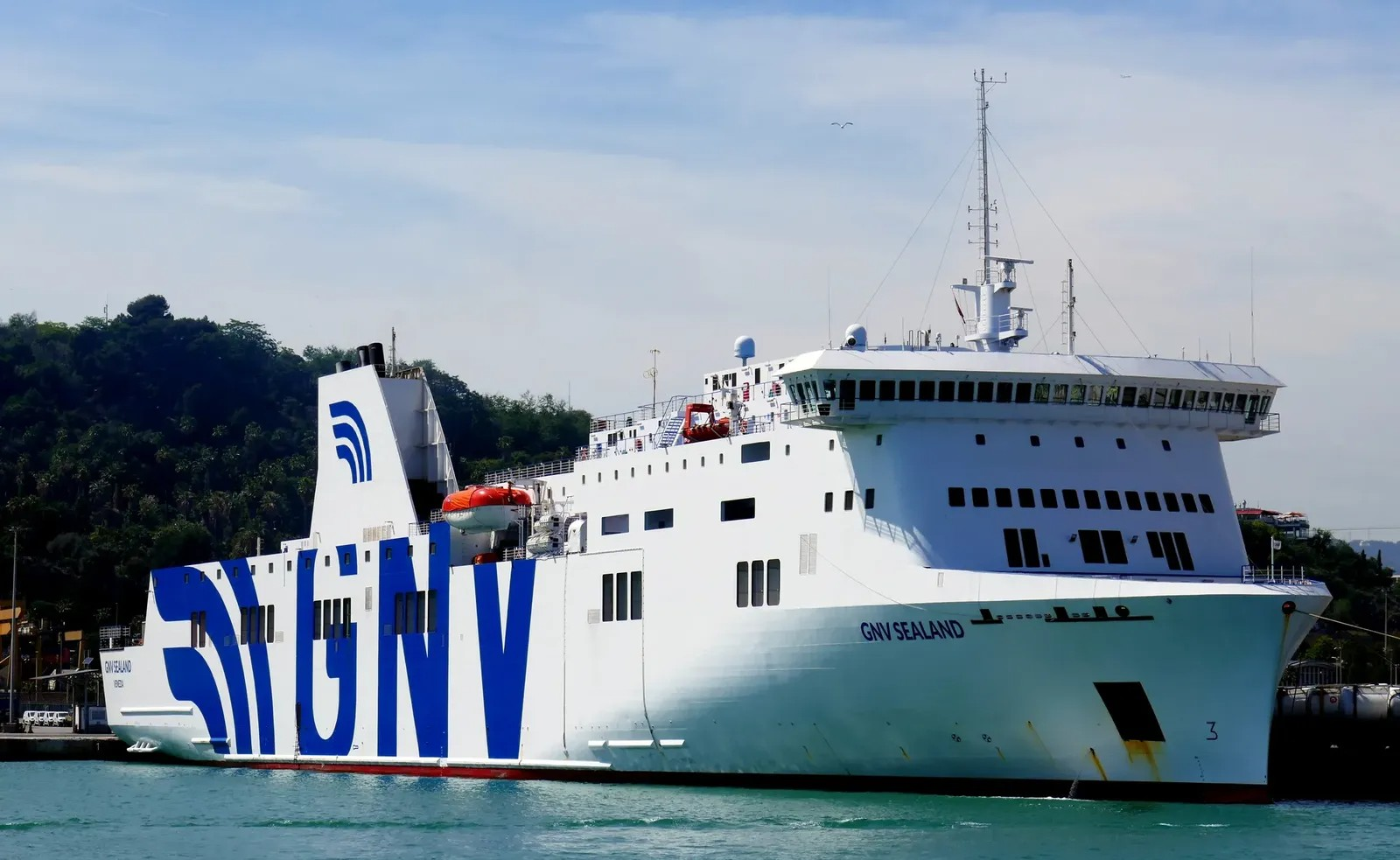
- GNV Sealand in Barcelona

History
- Name: 2009–2021: Scottish Viking; 2021–present: GNV Sealand
- Owner: 2009–present: Cantiere Navale Visentini (Visemar)
- Operator: 2009–2010: Norfolkline; 2010–2011: DFDS Seaways; 2011–2021: Stena Line; 2021–present: Grandi Navi Veloci
- Port of registry: 2009–2021: Visby, Sweden; 2021–present: Genova, Italy
- Route: Genoa – Palermo; Civitavecchia – Olbia; Barcelona – Palma de Mallorca; Former: Rosyth – Zeebrugge; Former: Nynäshamn – Ventspils
- Ordered: 2007
- Builder: Cantiere Navale Visentini; Porto Viro, Italy
- Yard number: 222
- Launched: 2009
- Completed: 2009
- Acquired: 2021 (chartered by GNV)
- Maiden voyage: 2009
- In service: 2009
- Identification: IMO number: 9435454; Call sign: IBXY; MMSI number: 247432800
- Status: in service

General characteristics
- Class & type: Visentini-class Ro-Pax Ferry
- Tonnage: 26,904 GT; 7,000 DWT
- Length: 186.36 m (611 ft 5 in)
- Beam: 25.60 m (84 ft 0 in)
- Draught: 6.70 m (22 ft 0 in)
- Depth: 15.00 m (49 ft 3 in)
- Decks: 8
- Ramps: Stern loading ramps
- Ice class: 1A
- Installed power: 2 × MAN-B&W 9L48/60B marine diesel engines (total 21,600 kW / 29,368 hp)
- Propulsion: 2 × controllable pitch propellers
- Speed: 22.0 knots (40.7 km/h; 25.3 mph) (service) / 24.0 knots (44.4 km/h; 27.6 mph) (max)
- Capacity: 880 passengers (111 cabins, 705 berths); 195 cars / 2,255 lane metres for freight
- Crew: 40–50

GNV Sealand is a 186.36-metre Ro-Pax ferry owned by Visentini and operated under long-term charter by Grandi Navi Veloci (GNV). Built in 2009 by Cantiere Navale Visentini in Porto Viro, Italy, she was originally delivered as Scottish Viking for Norfolkline (later operated by DFDS Seaways and Stena Line) before being renamed GNV Sealand in 2021. Powered by two MAN-B&W 9L48/60B diesel engines producing 21,600 kW, she reaches service speeds up to 24 knots, primarily operating on Mediterranean routes connecting mainland Italy with Sicily, Sardinia, and Spain.

== Characteristics ==
The ferry, built specifically to transport a large number of heavy vehicles, is capable of carrying a maximum of 205 cars and 2,255 linear meters of cargo, at the expense of its passenger capacity, limited to just 374 people. Powered by two MAN B&W 9L48/60B diesel engines, generating a maximum power of 21,600kW, it is capable of reaching a top speed of 24 knots.

== Service ==
The ferry, the second of a series of three sister units, was launched on 10 December 2008 at the Visentini shipyard in Porto Viro with the name Scottish Viking and delivered on 15 April 2009 to the British Norfolkline, from which it had been chartered on a long-term basis during construction, and was then introduced on 15 May on the connections between Rosyth and Zeebrugge, filling the gap left by the Superfast X of Superfast Ferries, following the cancellation of the Greek company's connection. About a year later, on 12 July 2010, with the acquisition of Norfolkline by the Danish DFDS, the charter of the ferry passed to the latter, for which it continued to operate the route between Scotland and Belgium for another five months, until 14 December, when it was taken out of service and returned to the Italian shipowner, who immediately chartered it to Scandlines, for which it returned to service on 3 January 2011 on the connections between Ventspils and Nynäshamn, replacing the Ask. On 11 October 2012, with the acquisition of part of the routes of the German company by Stena Line, the charter of the ferry was taken over by the latter.

On 14 January 2021, with the ten-year charter to Stena Line approaching its expiry, the ferry was chartered to Grandi Navi Veloci, from which it was taken over on 28 April at the Gdansk shipyard, where it arrived after having finished its service on the connections between Latvia and Sweden on 14 March. Renamed GNV Sealand, the ferry sailed on 1 May from Poland to the T. Mariotti shipyards in Genoa, where it arrived on 8 May to be repainted with the colours of the Italian company. On 21 May, at the end of the technical stop in Genoa, the ferry finally started service on the connections between Genoa and Porto Torres replacing the Rhapsody, subsequently also operating on the connections between the Ligurian port and Olbia, on those between the latter and Civitavecchia, and on those between the Lazio port and Termini Imerese. On 6 July it was finally transferred to the new connections between Valencia, Ibiza and Palma de Mallorca, together with the GNV Bridge, also chartered from Visemar di Navigazione, as already announced on 5 May by Grandi Navi Veloci, operating from the following 14 September on those between Barcelona, Ciutadella de Menorca and Palma de Mallorca.

On 5 March 2026, during the stopover in Barcelona, a fire broke out in the ferry's garage, caused by a vehicle present in the garage. Following this, on 12 March, about a week after the fire, the GNV Sealand sailed from Barcelona under tow of the tug VB Hispania to the Tarragona shipyards, where it will be repaired, being replaced in the meantime on the connections between Catalonia and Mallorca by the Golden Carrier. At the end of May, once the works were completed, the ferry then set sail for Termini Imerese, which on 29 May started connecting to Civitavecchia and Naples, replacing the Golden Carrier, which was returned to the owner company. In August it finally returned to serve the connections between Catalonia and the Balearics.

== Sister ships ==
- Livia
- Norman Atlantic
