= Rose George =

British journalist (born 1969)

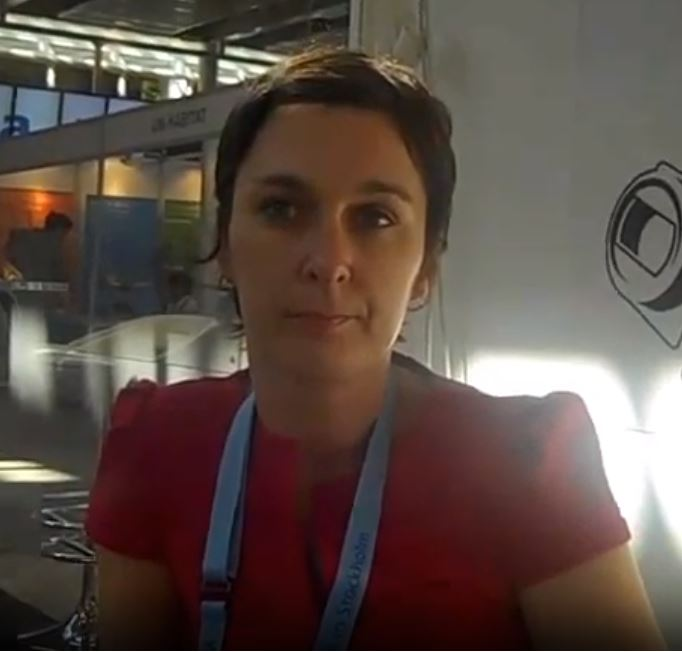
- Rose George (2010)
- Born: 1969 (age 56–57); England
- Education: Somerville College, Oxford (BA), University of Pennsylvania (MA)
- Occupations: Author & public speaker
- Writing career
- Notable works: Life Removed (2004), The Big Necessity (2008), Deep Sea & Foreign Going/Ninety Percent of Everything (2013), Nine Pints (2018)
- Website: www.rosegeorge.com

Rose George is a British journalist and author. She has explored topics such as refugees, sanitation, shipping, blood and fish in her books.

== Education ==
In 1992, George earned a First-Class Honours BA in Modern Languages from Somerville College, Oxford, followed by an MA in international politics in 1994 at the University of Pennsylvania, as a Thouron Scholar and Fulbright Fellow.

== Journalism ==
In 1994, she began her writing career as an intern at The Nation magazine in New York City. Subsequently, she assumed the roles of senior editor and writer at COLORS magazine, a bilingual publication published by Benetton. It focused on "local cultures with global reach", and was distributed in 80 countries. The magazine was initially based in Rome, later relocating to Paris and then Treviso.

In 1999, she moved to London to become a freelance journalist. She has written for many publications including The Independent on Sunday, The Guardian, The New York Times, The Spectator, Arena and many others. She also served as a war correspondent in Kosovo for Condé Nast Traveler magazine for one day, and twice attended Saddam Hussein's birthday party. She also spent 18 hours in Afghanistan reporting on women’s rights, for Glamour magazine. In 2003, she travelled to Bhutan to report on the alternative World Cup Final between the bottom-two ranking FIFA nations, Bhutan and Montserrat. Montserrat won 4-0.

Until 2010, she held the position of senior editor at large for Tank Magazine, a London-based quarterly covering fashion, art, reportage and culture.

She regularly reviews books for The Spectator, The New Statesman, Literature Review, and others.

== Speaking and activism ==
Rose has done two TED talks, one on sanitation, at TED Long Beach 2013 and another on shipping, at a private TED conference in Singapore also in 2013. She has spoken widely on issues such as sanitation, shipping, menstrual health and women’s rights and health.

== Political views ==
George has been vocally critical of some transgender activism when it encroaches upon women’s rights. In September 2023, she signed an open letter from the organization Sex Matters urging UK Prime Minister Rishi Sunak to "lead the fightback" against what the organization characterized as attacks on gender critical individuals.

George ended a Substack post criticizing UK politicians Matt Hancock and Suella Braverman by writing:

And I wonder whether the current gender fluid trans nonsense and its accompanying violence and lack of debate is because being trans is something to cling to, and when you hold tight to something, you get violent in its defence. I’m not talking here about the men who have co-opted trans rights into the women-silencing misogyny that has captured so many institutions. They will get their reckoning, one day. I mean instead the young girls and young women, mostly, who cling to the new cult because it is accessible and makes a certain sense, and they are led willingly by adults who should know better into surgery and hormones that can wreck lives.

== Personal life ==
George has lived in Leeds since 2011. She is a fell runner and has written about suffering from severe endometriosis in a review of a book about a different topic. She has written widely on women’s health, menstruation and her own difficult menopause. In 2019, she wrote a widely shared essay on depression and the menopause — “It feels like a derangement” — for the New York Review of Books and the Guardian.

== Books ==
- George, Rose (2004). A Life Removed. Penguin Books. ISBN 978-0141019055. It explores the daily reality of refugees and displaced people in and from Liberia.
- George, Rose (2008). The Big Necessity: the Unmentionable World of Human Waste and Why it Matters. Metropolitan Books (US), Portobello Books (UK). ISBN 978-0805090833. It was described as the one of "best nonfiction books of the new millennium" by the New York Times.
- George, Rose (2013). Ninety Percent of Everything: Inside Shipping, the Invisible Industry That Puts Clothes on Your Back, Gas in Your Car, and Food on Your Plate. Metropolitan Books. ISBN 978-0805092639. (UK: Deep Sea and Foreign Going, Portobello Books, ISBN 978-1846272998). George lived for five weeks aboard a shipping container ship to research her book on the shipping industry, and a week patrolling for pirates on a Portuguese navy frigate. The book was awarded the British Maritime Foundation’s Mountbatten Literature Award in 2013.
- George, Rose (2018). Nine Pints: A Journey Through the Money, Medicine, and Mysteries of Blood. Metropolitan Books. ISBN 978-1627796378. This was chosen by Bill Gates as one of his "Five Books... You Should Read This Summer" in 2019 and was short-listed for the LA Times Book Prize.
- George, Rose (2025). Every Last Fish: What Fish Do for US And What We Do To Them. W. W. Norton. ISBN 978-0393881479. (UK: published by Granta Books, ISBN 978-1783787920).

== Sources ==
- Rose, George. THE BIG NECESSITY. 1st edition. New York, New York: Metropolitan Books, 2008.
- George, Rose."... And Sewage, Too", nytimes.com. 28 April 2010.
