= MV Livia =

New Zealand ferry

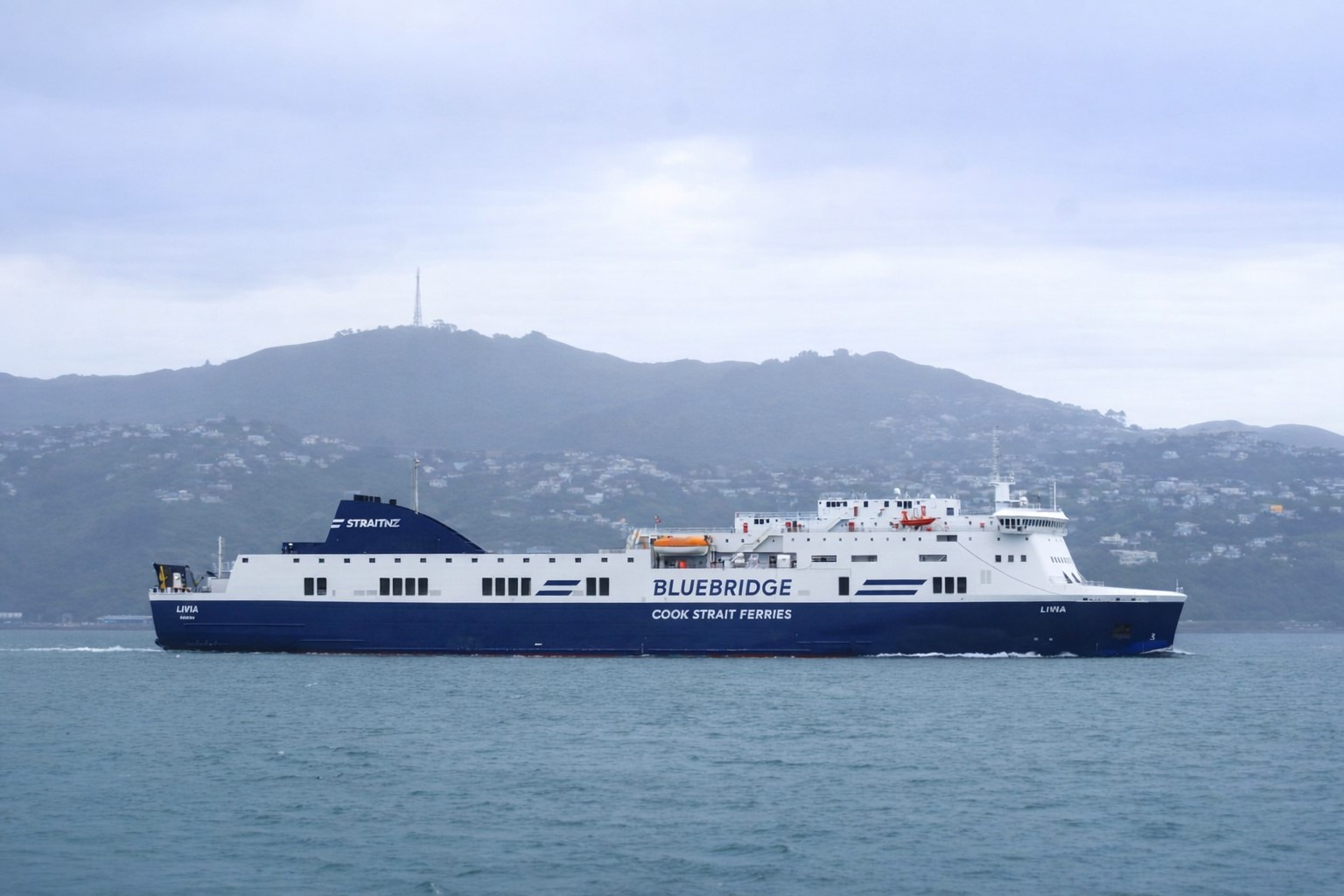
- Livia in Wellington, October 2025

History
- Name: Livia (2025–present); Stena Livia (2021–2025); Etretat (2014–2021); Norman Voyager (2008–2014)
- Owner: StraitNZ (2025–present); Stena RoRo (2012–2025); Epic Shipping Ltd (2008–2012)
- Operator: StraitNZ (2025–present); Stena Line (2021–2025); Brittany Ferries (2014–2021); DFDS Seaways (2012–2014); LD Lines (2011–2012); Celtic Link Ferries (2009–2011); LD Lines (2008–2009)
- Port of registry: 2025–present: Nassau, Bahamas; 2023-2025: Hellerup, Denmark; 2021–2023: Limassol, Cyprus; 2012-2021: Le Havre, France; 2008–2012: London, England
- Route: Wellington–Picton (from around August 2025)
- Builder: Cantiere Navale Visentini
- Yard number: 220
- Launched: 13 June 2008
- Maiden voyage: 6 November 2008
- Identification: Call sign: FIDP; IMO number: 9420423; MMSI number: 228022900
- Status: In service
- Notes: Sister ships:- Norman Atlantic, Scottish Viking, Stena Flavia.

General characteristics
- Tonnage: 26,904 GT
- Length: 186 m
- Beam: 25.6 m
- Draught: 6.8 m
- Decks: 8
- Speed: 24 kts (max)
- Capacity: 375 passengers and 200 cars
- Crew: 38

Livia is a roll-on/roll-off (Ro/Ro) ferry operated by StraitNZ on its Wellington to Picton service across the Cook Strait. It was built in 2008, and originally named Norman Voyager. In 2025, the ship was sold to StraitNZ, where it entered into service in July 2025, filling in for sister Connemara which was temporarily out of action in Singapore for drydock maintenance, and later replaced the aging Strait Feronia.

== Norman Voyager ==
The ship was built in 2008 by Cantiere Navale Visentini, Italy for Epic Shipping. She was chartered to LD Lines in 2008 and named Norman Voyager. She made her maiden voyage between Rosslare and Le Havre on 6 November 2008, when LD Lines operated a service in competition with Celtic Link Ferries between Rosslare and Cherbourg. In 2009 she was chartered to Celtic Link Ferries to replace the Diplomat, first operating between Rosslare, Cherbourg and Portsmouth, and before switching to the Rosslare–Cherbourg route at the end of 2009. She was chartered back to LD Lines in 2011 where she was re-registered in Le Havre, and operated between Marseille and Tunis.

In December 2009 she was involved in the rescue of three fishermen following the MV Alam Pintar and FV Etoile des Ondes collision. A report stated "The conduct of the rescue was safe, efficient and in the best traditions of the merchant navy." Later in 2011 she moved to the Portsmouth – Le Havre route.

In 2012 she was sold to Stena Line; from February 2013 to March 2014 she was operated by DFDS Seaways between Portsmouth and Le Havre.

== Étretat ==
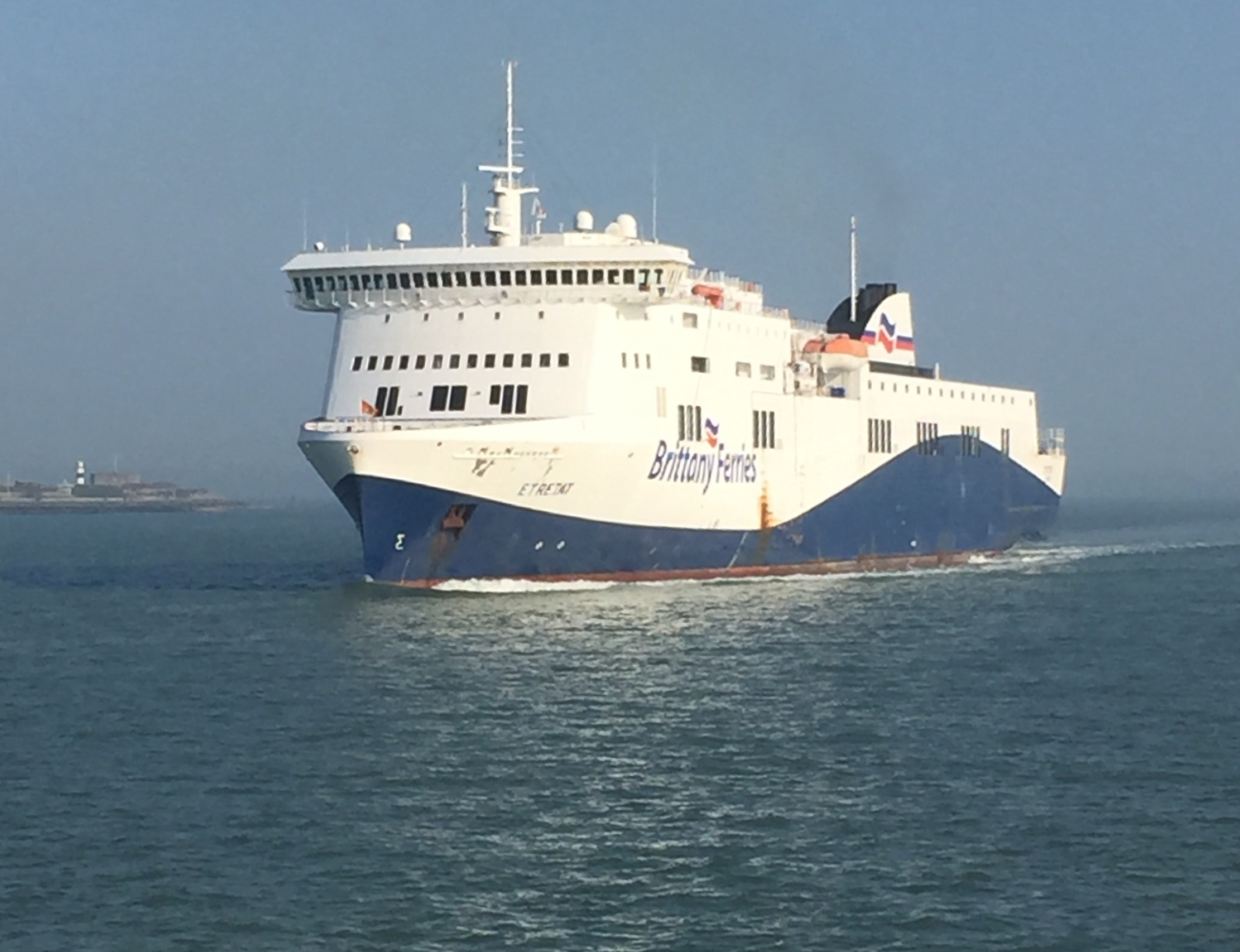
MV Etretat seen in Portsmouth Harbour

From 11 March 2014, Norman Voyager was chartered to Brittany Ferries, renamed Étretat (for a town in Normandy) and branded for its "économie" service. She continued to operate between Portsmouth and Le Havre on Tuesday to Friday. She also ran a weekly return crossing from Portsmouth to Santander on Saturday/Sunday.

Étretat had 13 designated pet-friendly cabins, in addition to 88 standard 4-berth inside and outside cabins, and 51 reserved lounge seats (to Le Havre) or 20 (to Santander).

During winter 2014–2015, she ran a weekly return crossing from Portsmouth to Bilbao to cover this service, normally run by MV Cap Finistère, which was laid up to allow the installation of extra scrubbers. She also ran a weekly freight-only service between Portsmouth and Le Havre on Friday.

== Stena Livia ==
On 9 April 2021, Stena Line announced that Étretat was to become the latest addition to their Baltic Sea fleet, renamed Stena Livia.

In March 2025, it was announced that StraitNZ had purchased the vessel to replace the Strait Feronia. On the morning 3 July 2025, the Livia arrived at Wellington. 100 spectators greeted the ship from Oriental Bay.
