= Duba Bridge =

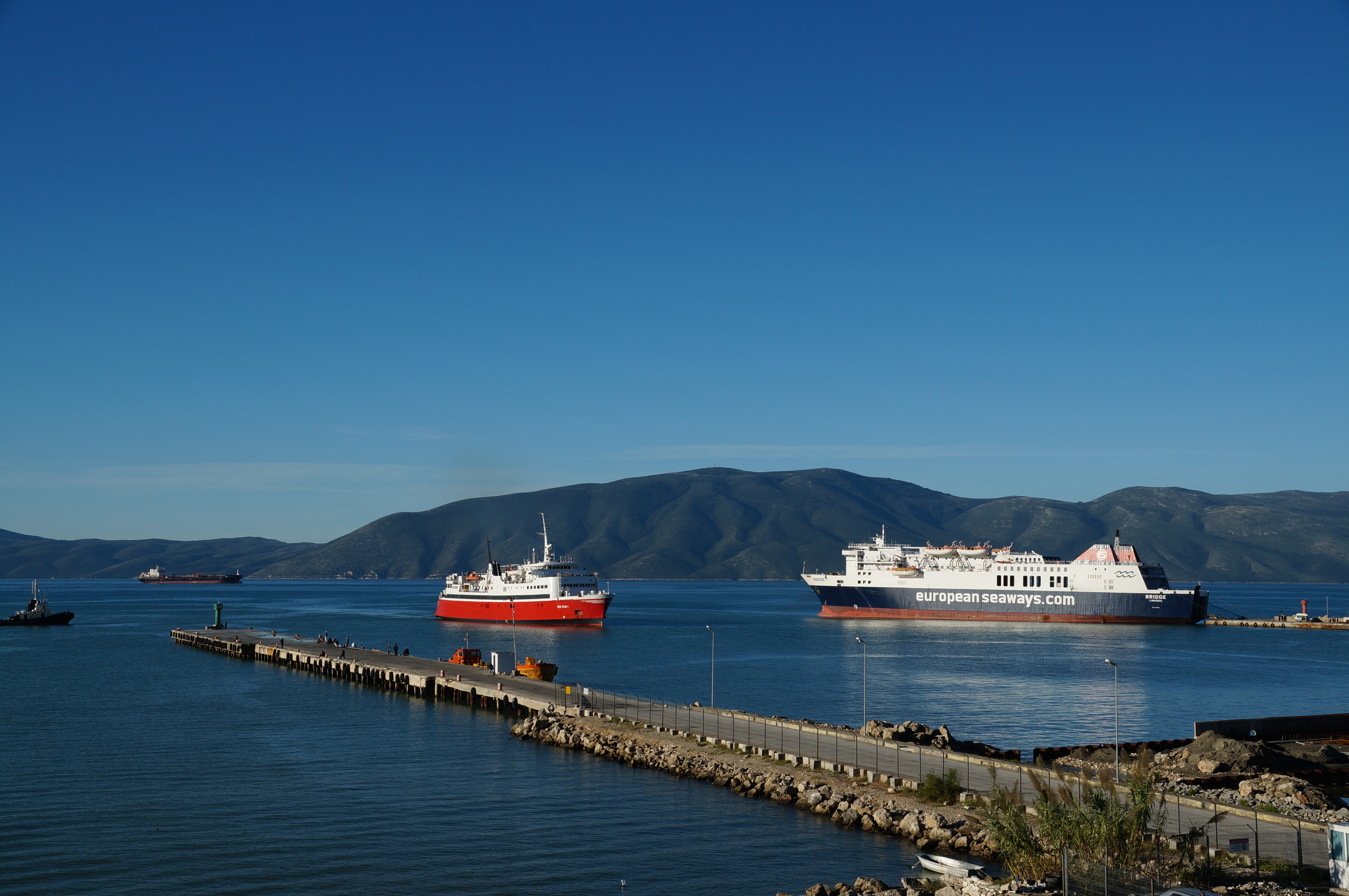
- Bridge (at right) in the Port of Vlora, 2015

History
- Name: 1976–1997: Bass Trader; 1997–1999: Ionian Bridge; 1999–2004: Blue Bridge; 2004–2010: Mercedes De Mar; 2010–2017: Bridge; 2017–2020: Duba Bridge
- Owner: 1976–1997: Australian National Line; 1997–1999: Strinzis Line; 1999–2004: Blue Ferries; 2004–2010: Iscomar; 2010–2017: European Seaways; 2017–2020: Costavia Shipping
- Port of registry: Cyprus
- Builder: State Dockyard, Newcastle, Australia
- Yard number: 94
- Launched: 8 November 1975
- Out of service: 2020
- Identification: IMO number: 7366252
- Fate: Scrapped

General characteristics
- Tonnage: 16,537 GT; 4,050 DWT
- Length: 142 m (465 ft 11 in)
- Beam: 23 m (75 ft 6 in)
- Draught: 7 m (23 ft 0 in)

Duba Bridge was a roll-on/roll-off cargo ship. Built by the State Dockyard for the Australian National Line as Bass Trader, it was later rebuilt with accommodation for passengers and operated for a variety of operators in Europe.

== History ==
Bass Trader was built by the State Dockyard, Newcastle for the Australian National Line being launched on 8 November 1975. It operated from Sydney to Hobart and Bell Bay until December 1996.

It was sold to Strinzis Line, Greece and was rebuilt in Perama into a ferry with accommodation for 204 passengers in 69 cabins, 536 deck passengers and space for 51 cars. Renamed Ionian Bridge, it operated between Greece and Italy. In 1999 it was sold to Blue Ferries and renamed Blue Bridge. In 2004 it was sold to Iscomar and renamed Mercedes De Mar operating between Barcelona and Palma de Mallorca.

In 2010 it was sold to European Seaways and renamed Bridge operating between Italy and Greece until being laid up in 2016. In October 2017 it was sold to Costavia Shipping and renamed Duba Bridge operating across the Red Sea between Duba, Saudi Arabia and Safaga in Egypt. In June 2018 it was chartered by Baleària and operated between Málaga and Melilla. It was laid up in Greece in 2020. It was sold to Shree Ram Shipping Industries for scrapping arriving in Alang, India in May 2021.
