= Ninety Percent of Everything =

2013 nonfiction book by Rose George

- Front cover of this book
- Author: Rose George
- Language: English
- Publisher: Metropolitan Books (New York City)
- Publication date: 2013
- Pages: 287 (first edition)
- ISBN: 978-0805092639
- OCLC: 811597783

Ninety Percent of Everything: Inside Shipping, the Invisible Industry That Puts Clothes on Your Back, Gas in Your Car, And Food on Your Plate (UK: Deep Sea and Foreign Going (Portobello, 2013, ISBN 9781846272998) is a book by Rose George about the international shipping industry. In 2013 the 287 page book was published in New York City by Metropolitan Books, an imprint of Henry Holt and Company.

== Critical reception ==
Michael Causey, writing for the Washington Independent Review of Books, found the book to be an effective way to communicate the logistics of shipping, but found the final quarter of the book to be flawed. Dwight Garner, writing for The New York Times, found the book to be "consistently absorbing".
