= Golden Carrier =

Train, car and passenger ferry of the Polish Unity Line

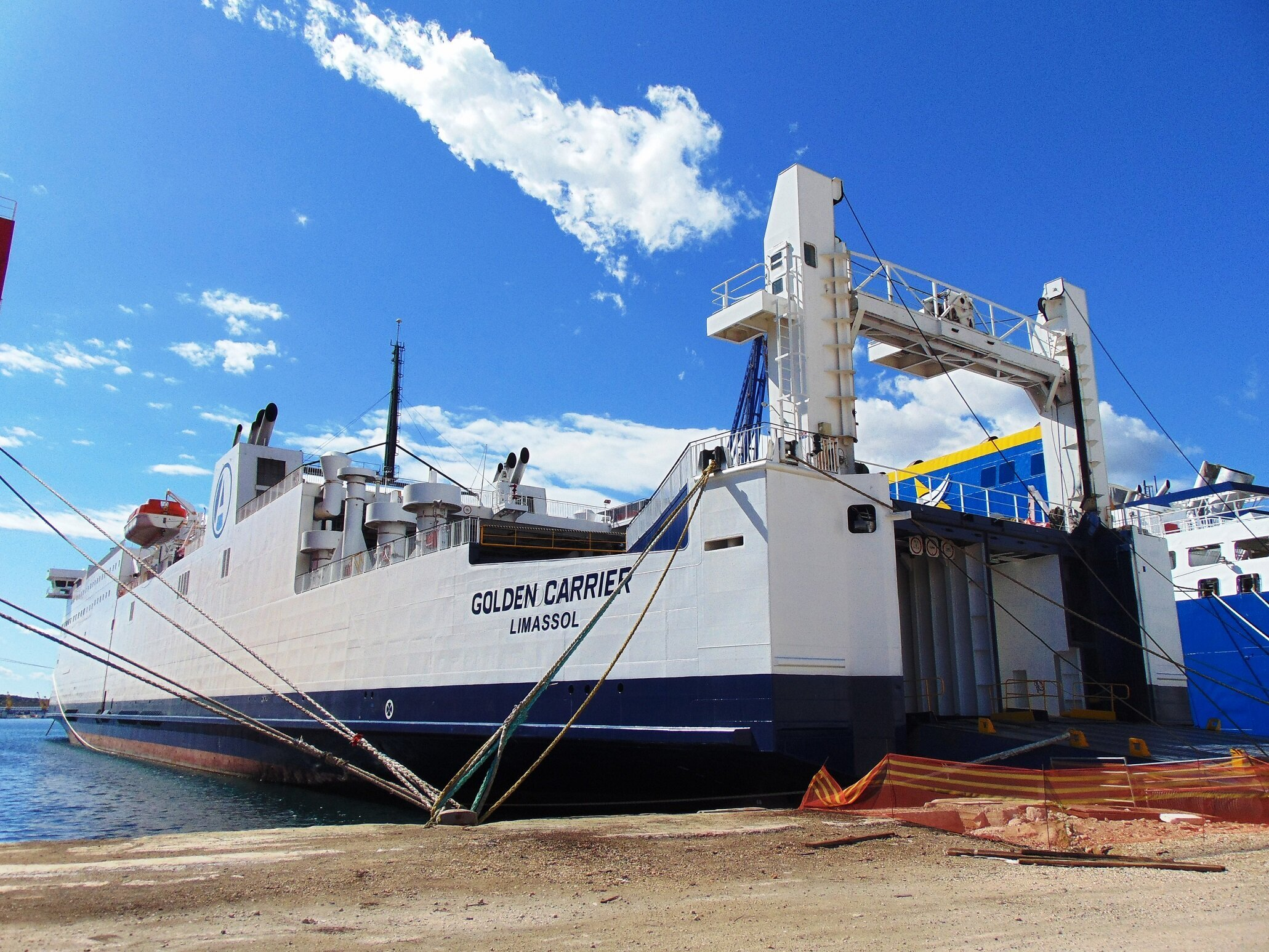
- Golden Carrier in Perama

History
- Name: 1986–2002: Öresund; 2002–2007: Sky Wind; 2007–2025: Wolin; 2025–present: Golden Carrier
- Owner: 1986–1996: Statens Järnvägar; 1996–2002: Partrederiet Oresund ANS; 2002–2005: SC RoPax I Ltd; 2005–2006: MV Sky Wind, Ltd; 2006–2007: Silja Cruise Ab; 2007–2009: Polstream; 2009–2025: Wolin Line Ltd / Polska Żegluga Morska; 2025–present: A-Ships Management SA
- Operator: 1986–1997: DanLink; 1997–2000: Scandlines AB; 2002–2007: Seawind Line; 2007–2025: Unity Line; 2025: A-Ships Management; 2025–2026: Grandi Navi Veloci; 2026–present: Trinidad & Tobago Inter-Island Transportation
- Port of registry: 1986–2002: Malmö / Helsingborg, Sweden; 2002–2007: Mariehamn, Finland; 2007–2025: Nassau, Bahamas; 2025–present: Limassol, Cyprus
- Route: Port of Spain – Scarborough; Former: Świnoujście – Trelleborg; Former: Turku – Stockholm; Former: Palermo – Napoli
- Builder: Moss Rosenberg Verft; Moss, Norway
- Yard number: 204
- Launched: 1986
- Completed: 1986
- Acquired: 2025 (by A-Ships Management)
- Maiden voyage: 1986
- In service: 1986
- Identification: IMO number: 8420842; Call sign: 5BKW5; MMSI number: 209869000
- Status: in service

General characteristics
- Class & type: Custom Ro-Pax Freight & Train Ferry
- Tonnage: 22,874 GT; 5,143 DWT
- Length: 186.02 m (610 ft 4 in)
- Beam: 23.70 m (77 ft 9 in)
- Draught: 5.90 m (19 ft 4 in)
- Decks: 8
- Ramps: Bow and stern loading ramps
- Installed power: 4 × MAN-B&W 6L 40/45 diesel engines (total 13,200 kW / 17,700 hp)
- Propulsion: 2 × controllable pitch propellers
- Speed: 18.0 knots (33.3 km/h; 20.7 mph) (service)
- Capacity: 370 passengers (240 berths); 1,720 lane metres for freight
- Crew: 30–40

Golden Carrier is an 186.02-metre Ro-Pax ferry owned by A-Ships Management and chartered by Grandi Navi Veloci (GNV). Built in 1986 by Moss Rosenberg Verft in Moss, Norway as Öresund, she previously operated under names including Sky Wind and Wolin before being renamed Golden Carrier in 2025. Powered by four MAN-B&W 6L 40/45 diesel engines, she operates freight and passenger routes in the Mediterranean and Caribbean.

== Service ==
The ferry, launched on 28 February 1986 at the Moss Rosenberg Værft shipyard in Moss as a rail unit with the name Öresund and delivered on 13 October 1986 to Statens Järnvägar, entered service on 3 November 1986 on the routes between Helsingborg and Copenhagen under the DanLink brand, replacing Malmöhus, which was simultaneously sold to Vikateatret A/S. On 1 January 1992 it was then transferred to the newly founded SweFerry.

In February 1995, she collided with the breakwater in Copenhagen Harbour. As a result, the partially damaged ferry was repaired in a shipyard in Fredericia. In June 1996 it was sold to Partrederi Öresund ANS, but continued to operate on charter to SweFerry.

On 1 July 2000, with the acquisition of the shipping company by Stena Line, after approximately 14 years of uninterrupted service in the Øresund, the ferry was laid up in Middelfart and put up for sale. About a year later, on 6 July 2001, it was sold to SC RoPax I Ltd, a company belonging to the British Sea Containers group, to which it was delivered on 1 January 2002, at the Remontowa shipyard in Gdańsk, where, after the effective change of ownership, it underwent major renovation work by the new owners, who transformed the unit into a passenger ferry. Once the restyling was completed, in September the ferry, renamed Sky Wind, was chartered to the Swedish Seawind Line, for which it entered service on 10 October on the routes between Turku, Långnäs and Stockholm, replacing Borden. On 7 April 2005 it was then sold outright to Sky Wind.

On 23 May 2007, following the termination of the shipping company's services, the ferry was sold to Unity Line, but continued to operate for the former owner until 19 August, when it was handed over to the Polish company. Renamed Wolin on the 22nd, the ferry sailed two days later from Stockholm to Trelleborg, where it arrived on 25 August. Subsequently, it was transferred back to the Remontova shipyards in Gdańsk, where it underwent major refitting, in preparation for its new deployment between Swinoujscie and Trelleborg, where it began operating on 8 October, after its technical layover.

On 31 January 2025, after about 15 years of service in the Baltic Sea, in view of the entry into service of the new Jantar Unity, the ferry performed its crossing between Sweden and Poland, at the end of which it was laid up in Swinoujscie and put up for sale. In March it was then announced that it would be sold to A-Ships Management, from which, once renamed Golden Carrier on 18 March, it was transferred on 1 April to the Perama shipyards, where it arrived to undergo some renovation works and adaptation to the new service in the Mediterranean, after having set sail on 20 April from Poland.

However, the ferry, which at the end of the works should have taken up service on the connections between Brindisi, Corfu and Igoumenitsa and on those between the Apulian port and Valona, was chartered to Grandi Navi Veloci on 22 November, setting sail the same day from Attica to Palermo, with a view to its use on the connections between the Sicilian port and Naples, to cover the increase in traffic, especially freight, following the suppression of the route by Moby Lines. On 25 November it then officially began to carry out this service. On 10 March 2026, after a few months of freight service between Campania and Sicily, the ferry set sail from Palermo to Barcelona, which it began to connect to Palma de Mallorca the following day, replacing its fleet mate GNV Sealand, out of service due to a fire. On 7 April, with the return to service of the Golden Bridge, the ferry finally resumed service on the connections between Naples and Palermo, operating from 25 April also on those between Civitavecchia and Termini Imerese, being replaced on the previous route by the GNV Blu. On 31 May, with the return to service of the GNV Sealand, the ferry performed its last crossing for GNV and set sail from Naples for the Perama shipyards, where it was laid up on 2 June.

On July 9, 2026, one month after returning to Attica, the ferry was again chartered, this time for twenty-five thousand dollars per day, for a total of six months, to the Government of Trinidad and Tobago, sailing to Port of Spain, which on July 26 began connecting to Scarborough, between the islands of Trinidad and Tobago, under the banner of NIDCo, replacing the Blue Wave Harmony.
