= Malaysian Bulk Carriers =

Malaysian Bulk Carriers Berhad
- Company type: Public limited company
- Traded as: MYX: 5077
- ISIN: MYL5077OO002
- Founded: 1988
- Headquarters: Level 17 & 18, PJ Tower, No 18, Jalan Persiaran Barat, Off Jalan Timur, 46050 Petaling Jaya, Selangor, Malaysia
- Key people: Ahmad Sufian @ Qurnain Abdul Rashid, Chairman; Kuok Khoon Kuan, CEO
- Website: www.maybulk.com.my

Malaysian Bulk Carriers Berhad (MYX: 5077) was incorporated on 19 November 1988. In 1995, it became the vehicle for a collaboration between Kuok Group and Global Maritime Ventures Berhad, a marine venture capital investment company funded by the Malaysian Government through Bank Industri & Teknologi Malaysia Berhad.

On 2 December 2003, MBC was listed on the Main Board of Bursa Malaysia. The MBC Group is one of the largest shipping enterprises in Malaysia and one of a handful of Malaysian shipping companies engaged in international shipping using its own fleet of vessels. MBC presently owns and operates a fleet of vessels comprising dry bulk carriers and product tankers. Apart from shipowning and operation, MBC is also engaged in ship management and operates a container depot.

== Subsidiaries ==
- Pacific Ship-Managers Sdn Bhd
- PSM Perkapalan Sdn Bhd
