= Saremar =

Ex Italian navigation company

Sardegna Regionale Marittima S.p.A.
- Industry: Shipping
- Founded: 1988
- Defunct: 01.04.2016
- Headquarters: Cagliari, Italy
- Area served: Tyrrhenian Sea
- Services: Passenger transportation Freight transportation
- Website: www.saremar.it

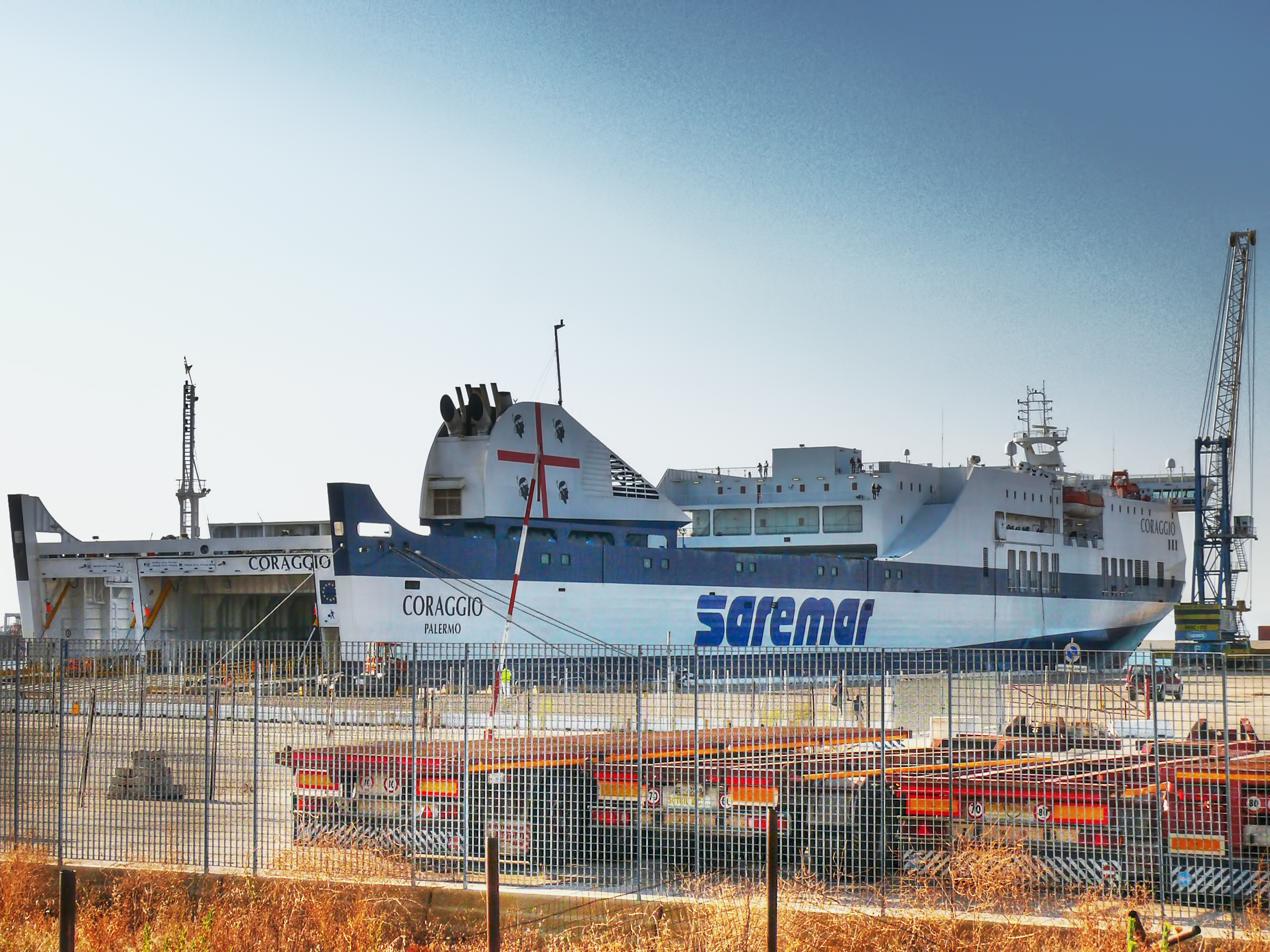
Coraggio Ferry in Porto Torres

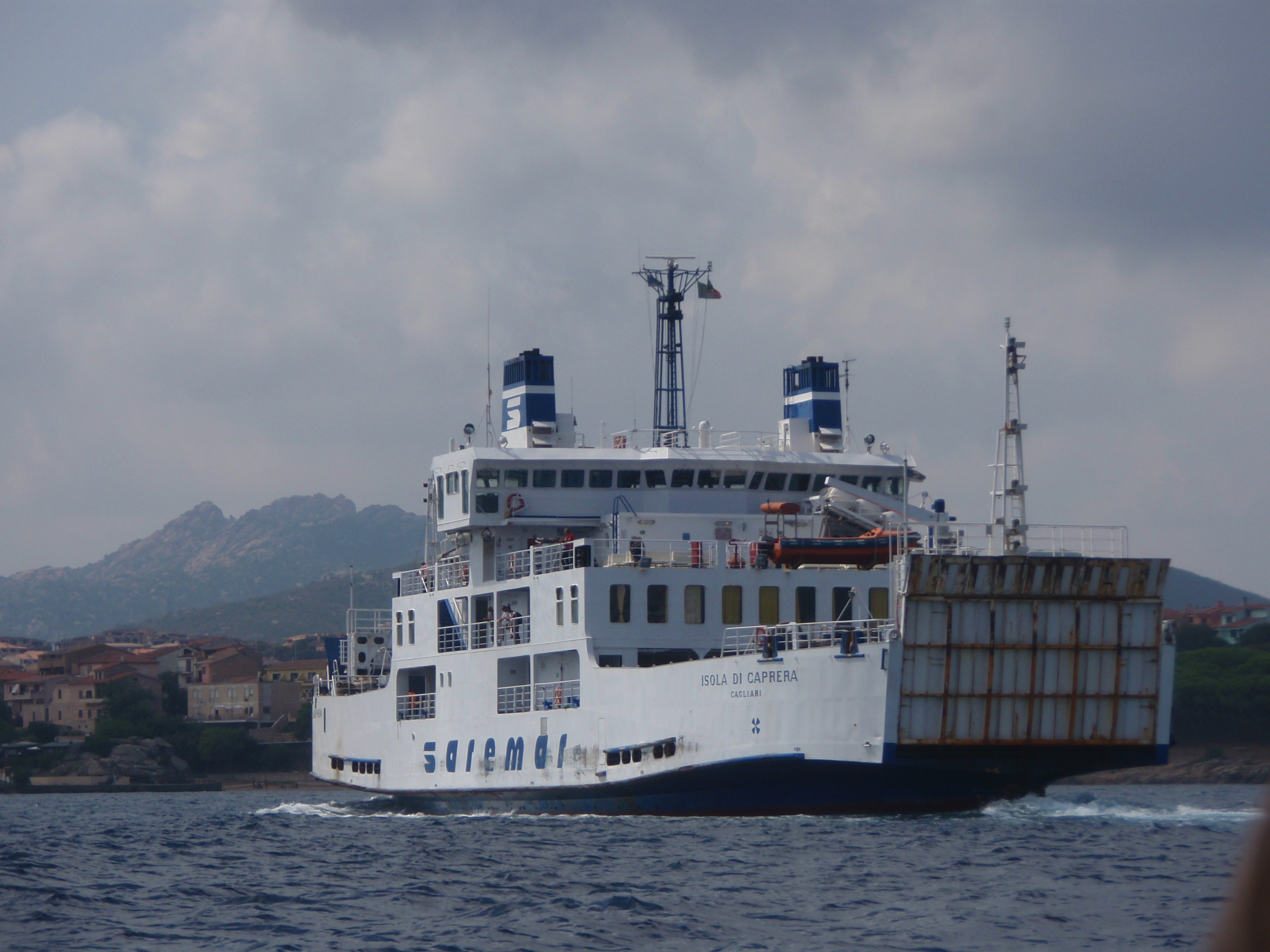
Isola di Caprera ferry.

Saremar (Sardegna Regionale Marittima) was an Italian shipping company, a subdivision of state-owned Tirrenia di Navigazione until 2009, when it was transferred to the Sardinian regional government. It operated in routes from Sardinia to La Maddelena and San Pietro islands, Bonifacio in Corsica, Savona, and Civitavecchia in Mainland Italy.

== Fleet ==
Name	Tonnage	Passengers	Car capacity / l.m.	Speed Knots	Type
Ichnusa	2,181	300	50	12	Ferry
Isola di Caprera	1,300	600	90	12	Ferry
Isola di S. Stefano	1,300	600	90	12	Ferry
Vesta	1,386	740	75	16	Ferry
Arbatax	494	300	20	10	Ferry
La Maddalena	494	300	20	10	Ferry
Sibilla	1,397	740	60	16	Ferry

== Routes ==
=== domestic ===
- Palau↔La Maddalena
- Portovesme↔Carloforte
- Calasetta↔Carloforte

=== Sardinia ↔ Corsica ===
- Santa Teresa di Gallura↔Bonifacio

=== Sardinia ↔ mainland ===
- Olbia ↔ Civitavecchia
- Porto Torres ↔ Savona Vado
