= Excellent (ship) =

Cruise ferry built by Fincantieri

- Excellent in Tangier

History
- Name: 1998–present: Excellent
- Owner: 1998–present: Grandi Navi Veloci (GNV) (MSC Group)
- Operator: 1998–present: Grandi Navi Veloci (GNV)
- Port of registry: 1998–present: Genova, Italy
- Route: Genoa – Palermo; Genoa – Barcelona – Tanger Med; Genoa – Tunis; Sète – Tanger Med
- Ordered: 1995
- Builder: Fincantieri; Sestri Ponente, Genoa, Italy
- Yard number: 5998
- Laid down: 1996
- Launched: 1997
- Completed: May 1998
- Acquired: 1998
- Maiden voyage: May 1998
- In service: 1998
- Identification: IMO number: 9143441; Call sign: IBEX; MMSI number: 247298000
- Status: in service
- Notes: Sister ship to Excelsior

General characteristics
- Class & type: Custom Fincantieri Ro-Pax Cruise Ferry
- Tonnage: 39,777 GT; 7,300 DWT
- Length: 202.17 m (663 ft 3 in)
- Beam: 28.00 m (91 ft 10 in)
- Draught: 6.70 m (22 ft 0 in)
- Depth: 9.40 m (30 ft 10 in)
- Decks: 10
- Ramps: 3 stern loading ramps
- Installed power: 4 × MAN B&W 8L48/60 main diesel engines (total 28,960 kW / 38,836 hp)
- Propulsion: 2 × controllable pitch propellers
- Speed: 24.0 knots (44.4 km/h; 27.6 mph) (service) / 25.5 knots (47.2 km/h; 29.3 mph) (max)
- Capacity: 2,230 passengers (429 cabins / 1,415 berths); 760 cars / 2,250 lane metres for freight
- Crew: 80–100

Excellent is a 202.17-metre high-capacity Ro-Pax cruise ferry owned and operated by Grandi Navi Veloci (GNV). Built in 1998 by Fincantieri at their Sestri Ponente shipyard in Genoa, Italy, she is the lead ship of her class and the sister vessel to MS Excelsior. Powered by four MAN B&W main diesel engines producing 28,960 kW, she operates major Tyrrhenian and Western Mediterranean routes connecting mainland Italy and France with Sicily, Tunisia, and Morocco.

== History ==
=== Origins and construction ===
Following the success of the sister ships Majestic and Splendid in 1993 and 1994, and the Fantastic in 1996, the Italian shipping company Grandi Navi Veloci established itself as a leader on routes between mainland Italy, Sicily, and Sardinia. In 1997, the company ordered two new cruise ferries, the sister ships Excellent and Excelsior. The plans for the new vessels revealed an improved version of the Fantastic, approximately 14 meters longer and with significantly greater capacity. To save time, the company had the sister ships built in two different shipyards. Construction of the Excellent began in 1997 and it was delivered to GNV on May 23, 1998.

=== Service ===
Before embarking on its commercial career, the Excellent first undertook a presentation voyage to Israel and Cyprus. Upon returning to Genoa, it made its maiden voyage to Olbia in Sardinia on June 25, 1998. Upon arrival, the ship suffered engine failure. During its first years of service, the Excellent served Sardinia in the summer season and Sicily the rest of the year.

In April 2000, the cruise-ferry was chartered by the Forza Italia political party as part of the campaign for the 2001 Italian general elections. The ship thus toured Italy, stopping at Livorno, Naples, Reggio di Calabria, Catania, Bari, Pescara, Ancona, Rimini and Venice.

In 2008, the Excellent was assigned to the routes between Italy, Spain and Morocco. In 2016, the ship was repainted in GNV's new colours. In October 2017, the Excellent is used as a floating hotel in Saint Kitts and Nevis to house people affected by Hurricane Irma.

On January 27, 2018, a fire broke out on board during a crossing between Genoa and Tunis. The ship managed to return to Genoa under its own power and the fire was extinguished.

On October 31, as the Excellent was preparing to dock in Barcelona in strong winds, the crew requested assistance. While awaiting the arrival of tugboats, port authorities instructed the crew to move the ship to a more sheltered area of the port, but the cruise ferry was driven against the quay. Its bulbous bow struck the quay while its prow pushed against one of the port's loading cranes, causing it to crash onto about fifty containers, some filled with flammable products, which exploded. None of the 414 passengers on the Excellent or the port employees were injured. The ship continued its voyage to Morocco. Upon its return to Genoa, the cruise ferry was taken to the shipyards of Messina for repairs. From 5 March to 25 May 2021 it was chartered by the Ministry of the Interior and used as a quarantine ship as part of the emergency landings in Sicily. In June 2025 it was transferred to the new connections between Algiers, Sète and Béjaïa.

== Facilities ==
=== Public facilities ===
The Excellent offers its passengers a variety of facilities during the crossing, primarily located on decks 6 and 9. The ship features two bars, three restaurants, a swimming pool, a boutique, a casino, a wellness center, a video game arcade, a children's playroom, four lounges, and a conference center. Some of these facilities may be closed during certain crossings.

Among the ship's facilities are:

- The Olympia: The vast main lounge bar located at the bow of the ship on deck 6, entertainment is offered there depending on the crossings;
- The Arts: The piano bar located on deck 6 in the middle of the ship;
- The Miami Cafe: The pool bar located at the stern of the ship on deck 6;
- The Mediterranea: The ship's self-service restaurant located in the middle on deck 6;
- The Orangery: The ship's restaurant located at the stern on deck 6;
- The Chic Bazaar: The ship's shopping arcade located in the middle of deck 6;
- The Dream Machine: the casino located in the middle of deck 6 near the Plaza Arcade lounge bar;
- The lounge chairs: they are located on deck 9 in the middle of the ship and are available to passengers without cabins.

=== Cabins ===
The Excellent has 429 cabins located on decks 7 and 8. Able to accommodate up to four people and all equipped with full bathrooms, 38 of them are luxury suites.

== Features ==
The Excellent is 202.17 meters long and 26.8 meters wide, with a draft of 6.9 meters. Its gross tonnage is 39,777 GT. The ship can accommodate 2,253 passengers and has a garage with space for 760 vechiles spread over four levels, accessible via three stern ramps. It is fully air-conditioned. It is powered by four Sulzer-Wärtsilä 8L46A 8-cylinder in-line semi-high-speed diesel engines, developing 28,960 kW of power, driving two Lips controllable-pitch propellers, enabling the vessel to reach speeds of over 24 knots. It is also equipped with two bow thrusters and a roll stabilizer with two retractable fins. The ship is equipped with six large enclosed lifeboats, numerous life rafts, a rescue boat and a semi-rigid boat complete the rescue equipment.

== Routes served ==
For Grandi Navi Veloci, the Excellent served on the Genoa - Olbia, Genoa - Palermo and Genoa - Porto Torres routes at the beginning of his career.

Currently, the ship is in service on Sète - Béjaïa, Sète - Algiers, Genoa - Barcelona - Tangier, Sète - Tangier or Genoa - Tunis depending on the period.
