= MS Majestic =

Cruise ferry built in Italy

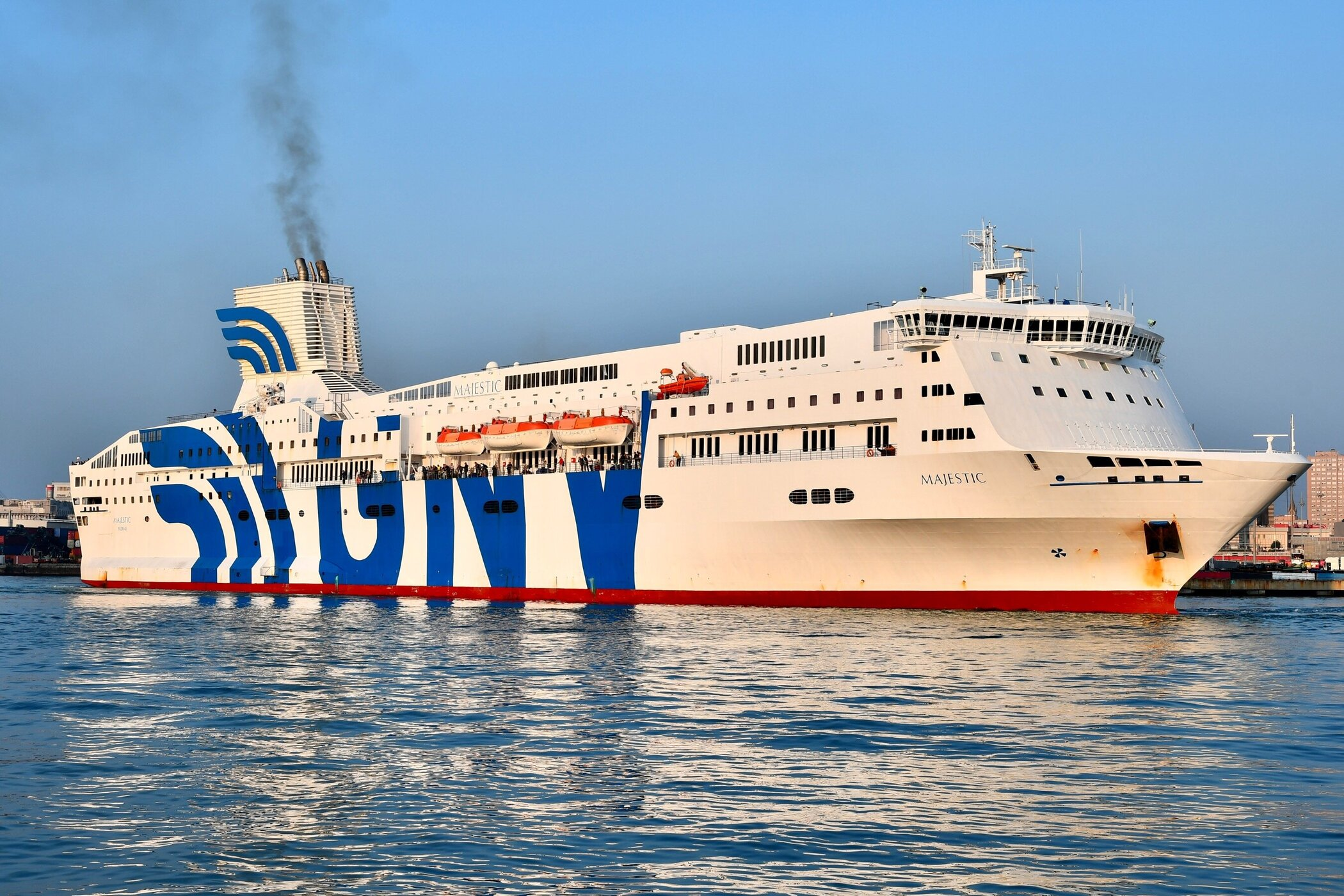
- Majestic in Genova

History
- Name: 1993–present: Majestic
- Owner: 1993–present: Grandi Navi Veloci (GNV) (MSC Group)
- Operator: 1993–present: Grandi Navi Veloci (GNV)
- Port of registry: 1993–present: Palermo, Italy
- Route: Genoa – Barcelona – Tanger Med; Sète – Tanger Med; Genoa – Palermo
- Ordered: 1991
- Builder: Nuovi Cantieri Apuania; Marina di Carrara, Italy
- Cost: 150 billion ITL
- Yard number: 1159
- Laid down: 27 February 1991
- Launched: 8 December 1992
- Completed: 11 May 1993
- Acquired: 1993
- Maiden voyage: 26 May 1993
- In service: 1993
- Identification: IMO number: 9015735; Call sign: IBAM; MMSI number: 247142000
- Status: in service
- Notes: Sister ship to Splendid

General characteristics
- Class & type: Majestic-class Cruise Ferry
- Tonnage: 33,057 GT; 6,875 DWT
- Length: 188.15 m (617 ft 3 in)
- Beam: 27.60 m (90 ft 7 in)
- Draught: 6.70 m (22 ft 0 in)
- Depth: 8.30 m (27 ft 3 in)
- Decks: 10
- Ramps: Bow and stern loading ramps
- Installed power: 4 × Sulzer-France 8ZA40S main diesel engines (total 23,040 kW / 31,326 hp)
- Propulsion: 2 × controllable pitch propellers
- Speed: 23.0 knots (42.6 km/h; 26.5 mph) (service)
- Capacity: 1,790 passengers (360 cabins); 760 cars / 1,725 lane metres for freight
- Crew: 90–120

Majestic is a cruise ferry built between 1992 and 1993 by the Nuovi Cantieri Apuania shipyard in Marina di Carrara for the Italian company Grandi Navi Veloci. It entered service in May 1993, between the Italian mainland and Sicily, it is the first cruise-ferry in Italy and also the first ship of the Grandi Navi Veloci company.

== History ==
=== Origins and construction ===
In the early 1990s, Italian shipping magnate Aldo Grimaldi, founder of the Grimaldi Group, decided to launch a shipping company to connect the main Italian islands in the Mediterranean, offering a level of comfort that would surpass that of other vessels. Founded in 1992, Grandi Navi Veloci became the first shipping company in Italy to operate cruise ferries, a hybrid between a traditional car ferry and a cruise ship.

From the outset, the shipping company commissioned its first vessel from the Nuovi Cantieri Apunia shipyard in Marina di Carrara. Designed to be approximately 190 meters long and exceeding 30,000 GT, it would carry 1,700 passengers and 700 vehicles at a speed of 23 knots. Its interior was designed to be the most luxurious on a car ferry, featuring a lounge bar, a gourmet restaurant, an indoor swimming pool, and a seminar space. All cabins would have private bathrooms, and the ship would even include a few suites. Particular attention was paid to the interior design.

Named Majestic, it was launched on December 8, 1992. After finishing touches, it is delivered to GNV on May 11, 1993. It was then the largest car ferry under the Italian flag.

=== Service ===
The Majestic was inaugurated in Genoa on May 23, 1993 at the Assereto bridge in the presence of Aldo Grimaldi and other prominent figures from the maritime world. He left Genoa in the evening of May 26 for its inaugural voyage to Palermo in Sicily.

The ship's initial crossings were a resounding success, confirming GNV's presence in the Mediterranean as early as 1994 with the commissioning of a sister ship, the Splendid, and the opening of a route to Sardinia. The Majestic was quickly superseded by larger vessels such as the Fantastic in 1996, followed by the Excellent and the Excelsior in 1998 and 1999. The ship then became multi-purpose, operating on all GNV routes between Sicily and Sardinia at various times of the year. From 2005, it was transferred to the international network between Genoa, Tunisia and Malta, then in 2007 to the line between Genoa, Spain and Morocco.

On May 26, 2012, the Majestic inaugurates GNV's lines between France and Morocco, ensuring the first crossing between the two countries since the bankruptcy of the Moroccan companies Comarit and Comanav.

During its technical stopover carried out between November and December 2015, the ship was fitted with two stabilizers at the rear and repainted in GNV's new colours with the logo appearing very large on its hull.

During its technical stop in Naples in 2020, the ship was fitted with scrubbers, a flue gas cleaning system designed to reduce CO2 emissions. However, the installation of this device resulted in modifications to the cruise-ferry's funnel, which was completely rebuilt and now appears taller than the original.

== Facilities ==
=== Common areas ===
The Majestic offers its passengers a variety of facilities during the crossing, mainly located on decks 6 and 9. The ship has two bars, two dining areas, a swimming pool, a shop, a casino, a wellness center, a video game area, a children's playroom, several lounges and a conference center.

=== Cabins ===
The Majestic has 341 cabins located on decks 7 and 8. Able to accommodate up to four people and all equipped with full bathrooms, 19 of them are luxury suites.

== Features ==
The Majestic is 188.15 meters long and 27.60 meters wide, with a draft of 6.70 meters. Its gross tonnage is 33,057 GT. The ship can accommodate 1,790 passengers and has a garage with space for 760 vechiles spread over four levels, accessible via three stern ramps. It is fully air-conditioned. It is powered by four Sulzer France 8ZA40S semi-high-speed diesel engines, developing 23,040 kW of power, driving two Lips controllable-pitch propellers, enabling the vessel to reach speeds of over 23 knots. It is also equipped with a bow thruster and a roll stabilizer with two retractable fins. The ship carries four large enclosed lifeboats, numerous life rafts, two rescue boats, and a rigid inflatable boat.

== Routes serve ==
For Grandi Navi Veloci, the Majestic served on the Genoa - Palermo route at the beginning of its career. After briefly serving the Livorno -Palermo route in 2003, it was transferred to the international routes between Genoa, Tunis and Malta in 2005 and then Genoa- Barcelona - Tangier in 2007. From 2012, it inaugurated the Sète -Tangier and Sète- Nador routes.

Currently, the ship is primarily used on GNV's international routes, notably Genoa - Barcelona - Tangier. It occasionally serves the company's other routes between Naples or Civitavecchia and Palermo, often replacing other ships in the fleet.
