= COVID-19 pandemic on ships =

COVID-19 on ships refers to:

- COVID-19 pandemic on cruise ships
- COVID-19 pandemic on naval ships
- Hospital ships designated for the 2019–20 coronavirus pandemic
