= La Suprema =

Cruise ferry belonging to Grandi Navi Veloci

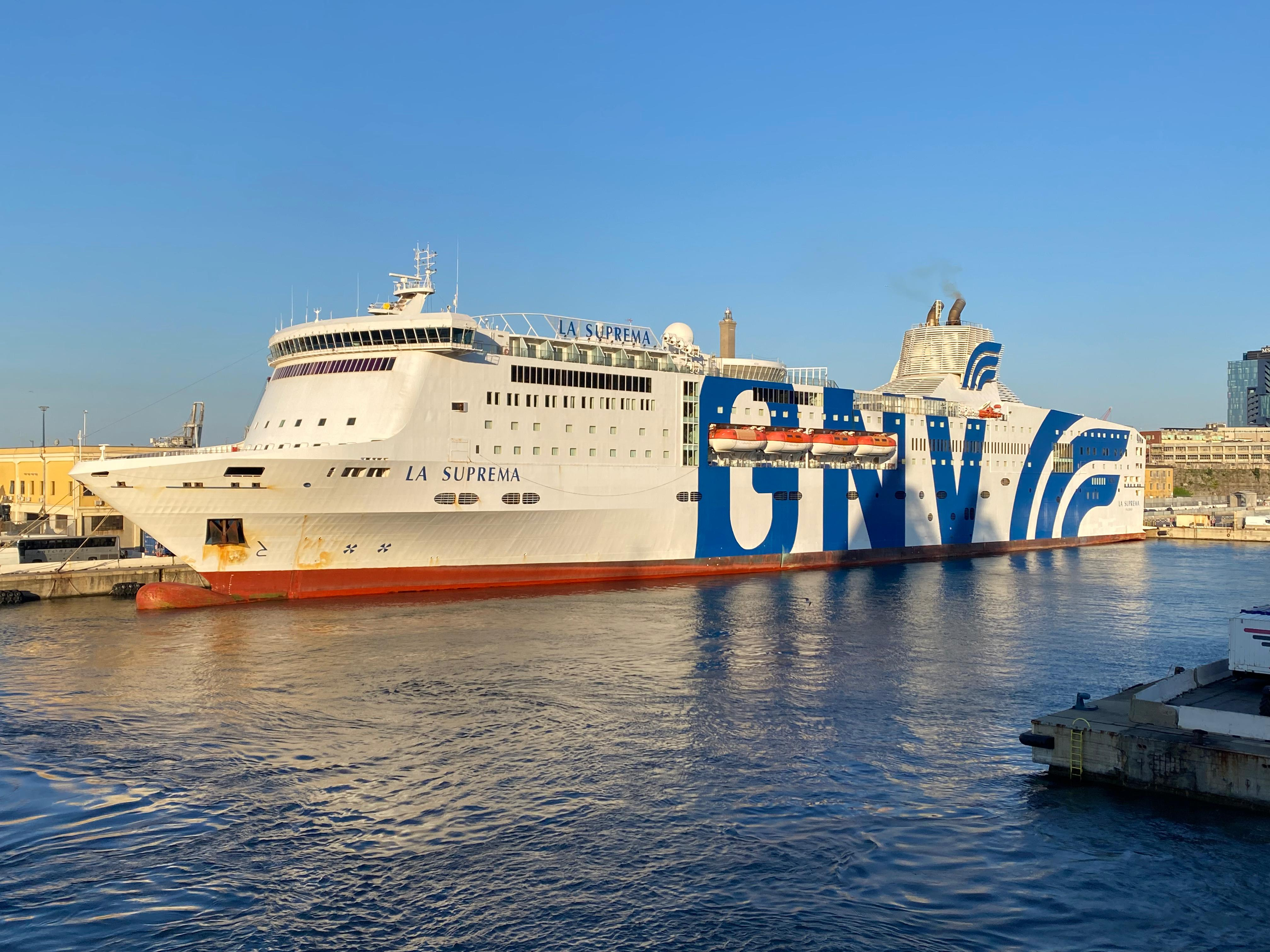
- La Suprema in Genoa

History
- Name: La Suprema
- Owner: Grandi Navi Veloci
- Operator: Grandi Navi Veloci
- Port of registry: Palermo, Italy
- Builder: Nuovi Cantieri Apuania, Marina di Carrara, Italy
- Launched: August 2002
- Completed: May 2003
- In service: 2003–present
- Identification: Call sign: IBIL; IMO number: 9214288; MMSI number: 247083700
- Status: In service

General characteristics
- Type: Cruiseferry
- Tonnage: 49,257 GT
- Length: 211.5 m (693 ft 11 in)
- Beam: 30.4 m (99 ft 9 in)
- Draught: 7.5 m (24 ft 7 in)
- Installed power: 4 × Wärtsilä 16V46C; 67,200 kW (combined)
- Speed: 30 knots (56 km/h; 35 mph)
- Capacity: 2,920 passengers; 984 vehicles

MS La Suprema is a cruiseferry owned and operated by the Italian ferry company Grandi Navi Veloci. It was built at Nuovi Cantieri Apuania in Marina di Carrara, Italy. The second of a two-ship class, La Suprema and her sistership La Superba were the largest passenger ferries of the Mediterranean at the time of their completion; they were surpassed in 2008 by Cruise Roma of Grimaldi Ferries. Its construction cost about 120 million dollars.

The ship can carry 2,920 passengers accommodated in 567 cabins and 940 seats and 984 cars on four garages, with a total capacity of 2,800 linear meters of cargo. Services on board include one à la carte restaurant and a self-service restaurant with 404 and 402 seats, respectively, six bars, including a panoramic bar, swimming pools, gym, Jacuzzi, shops, boutiques, slot machines, card rooms, lounges for reading, theater, cinema, a disco with 176 places and a chapel. Of the 567 cabins, 31 are double suites, 6 are presidential suites with balconies and 4 are equipped for disabled passengers.

The ship is equipped with four Wärtsilä 16V46C engines, that develop a total output of 67,200 kW. Propelled by two propellers with four blades, it can reach a top speed of about 30 knots. The ship is fitted with two bow thrusters for a total power of 1500 kW, while the electric current and on-board services are provided by four Wärtsilä generators that develop an aggregate 9,360 kW.

La Suprema was launched at Nuovi Cantieri Apuania in August 2002, and entered service on the Genoa-Porto Torres route in May 2003. In the following years, the ship and her sister ship La Superba were employed on different lines served by GNV, including the Genoa-Palermo route. Occasionally La Suprema was also used for mini-cruises in the Mediterranean, especially in the New Year period.

In February 2008, the Vietnamese Vinashin shipping company contracted with GNV to purchase both ships at the end of the summer, but the high costs for the sale ended the negotiations. La Suprema and La Superba remain in service for GNV, sailing on the routes between Sicily and Tunisia; La Suprema, the most modern ship in the GNV fleet, is currently operated on the Genoa-Palermo route.

In 2021, the ship was used by the Italian Red Cross to quarantine migrants rescued at sea to prevent the spread of COVID-19.

== See also ==
- Largest ferries of Europe
