= Fantastic (ship) =

Ship built in Italy

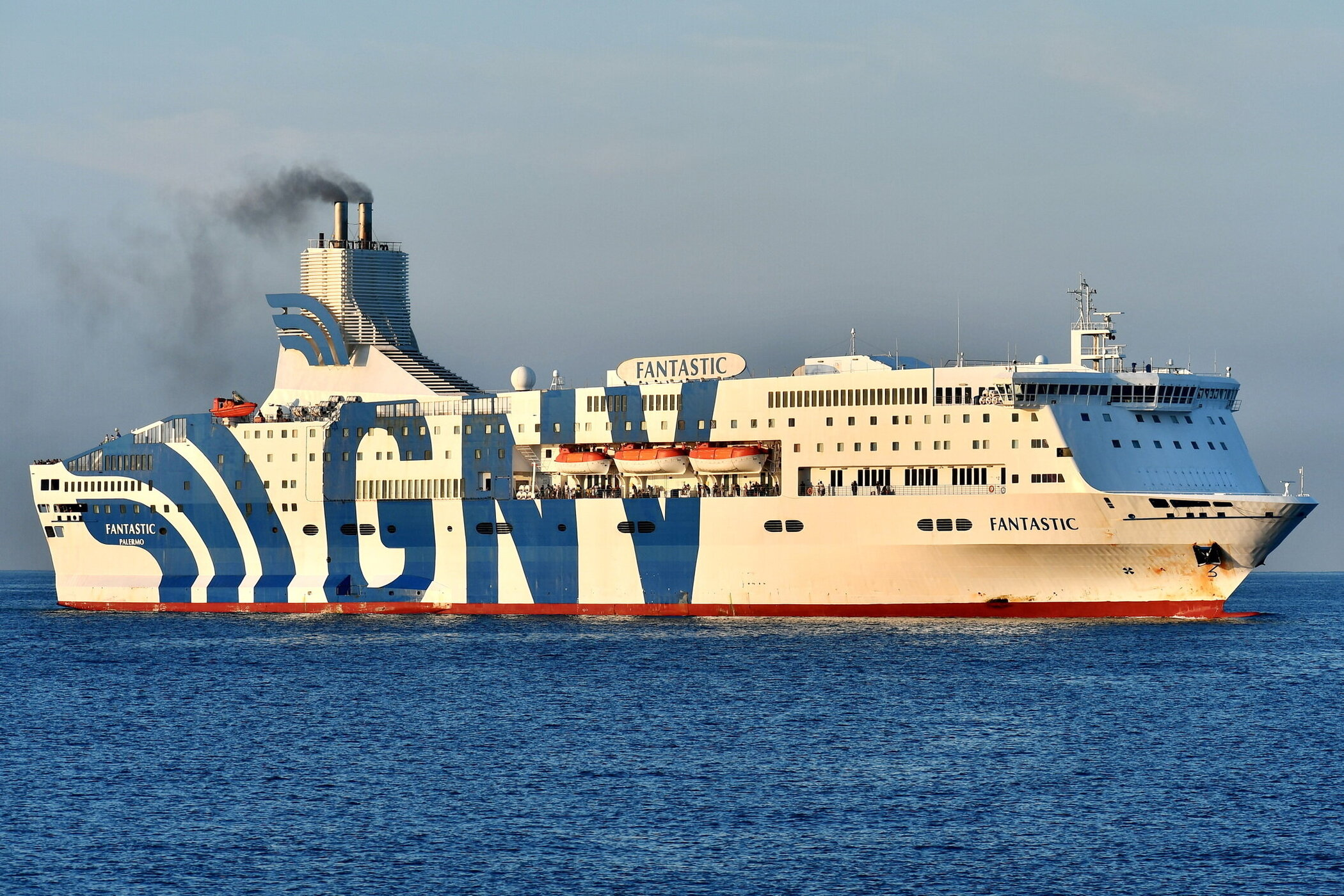
- Fantastic in Genova

History
- Name: 1996–present: Fantastic
- Owner: 1996–present: Grandi Navi Veloci (GNV) (MSC Group)
- Operator: 1996–present: Grandi Navi Veloci (GNV)
- Port of registry: 1996–present: Palermo, Italy
- Route: Genoa – Palermo; Genoa – Barcelona – Tanger Med; Genoa – Tunis; Sète – Tanger Med
- Ordered: 1994
- Builder: Nuovi Cantieri Apuania; Marina di Carrara, Italy
- Yard number: 1172
- Laid down: 1994
- Launched: 1995
- Christened: 25 May 1996
- Completed: May 1996
- Acquired: 1996
- Maiden voyage: May 1996
- In service: 1996
- Identification: IMO number: 9100269; Call sign: IBFA; MMSI number: 247196000
- Status: in service

General characteristics
- Class & type: Extended Majestic-class Cruise Ferry
- Tonnage: 35,222 GT; 7,000 DWT
- Length: 188.22 m (617 ft 6 in)
- Beam: 27.60 m (90 ft 7 in)
- Draught: 6.81 m (22 ft 4 in)
- Depth: 9.20 m (30 ft 2 in)
- Decks: 10
- Ramps: Bow and stern loading ramps
- Installed power: 4 × Sulzer 8ZA40S main diesel engines (total 25,920 kW / 35,240 hp)
- Propulsion: 2 × controllable pitch propellers
- Speed: 23.0 knots (42.6 km/h; 26.5 mph) (service) / 24.5 knots (45.4 km/h; 28.2 mph) (max)
- Capacity: 2,033 passengers (373 cabins / 1,400 berths); 760 cars / 1,700 lane metres for freight
- Crew: 90–110

Fantastic is a cruise ferry built from 1994 to 1996 by the Nuovi Cantieri Apuania shipyard in Marina di Carrara, Italy, for the Italian company Grandi Navi Veloci. It entered service in June 1996, on the lines between the Italian mainland and Sicily, it is now mainly positioned on GNV's international lines between Italy, France, Spain and Morocco, as well as on Tunisia and more recently towards Algeria.

== History ==
=== Origins and construction ===
The Grandi Navi Veloci company was launched in 1993 with the commissioning of the Majestic, which quickly became a great success on the Genoa - Palermo route. A second ship, the Splendid, was subsequently put into service the following year between Genoa and Porto Torres. Given the growing success of the young company, a third ship was ordered. Similar in design to the two previous vessels, the new unit was nevertheless larger. Named Fantastic, the ship was laid down on February 25, 1994, at the Nuovi Cantieri Apuania shipyard in Marina di Carrara, then launched on December 2, 1995. Once completed, the Fantastic was delivered to its owner on May 25, 1996.

=== Service ===
Before entering service, the Fantastic undertook a presentation voyage from Genoa to Malaga, Lisbon, and Palma de Mallorca. The ship then made its maiden voyage on June 28, 1996 between Genoa and Porto Torres in Sardinia. On September 22, 1998, the cruise-ferry is assigned to GNV's new international route between Italy and Spain.

On October 30, 2008, the Fantastic was caught in a particularly violent storm at the entrance to the port of Genoa. The ship lurched sharply to starboard and nearly capsized with 439 passengers on board. The cruise ferry nevertheless managed to reach shelter in the port of Genoa, but not without violently striking the quayside due to the strong gusts. Captain Filippo Renato Sorci declared a few days later that in his 30-year career, he had never seen such a storm. In March 2016, the ship is repainted in GNV's new colours during its technical stop.

On January 13, 2018, while maneuvering to leave port in Barcelona, an engine failure occurred. Without propulsion, the Fantastic collided with the Viking Star cruise ship, which was docked nearby. No one was injured in the accident, and both ships sustained only minor damage.

On June 28, 2020, while the ship was undergoing a technical stop in Marseille, a fire, caused by overheating following the injection of expanding polyurethane foam, broke out in the ballast tanks. The fire, requiring the intervention of 36 fire engines and 105 personnel, was finally brought under control and extinguished after five hours, without causing any injuries. During this technical stop, the Fantastic had scrubbers installed, a fume purification system designed to reduce its sulfur emissions. The installation of this system necessitated modifications to the funnel, which was raised. It was initially intended to be decorated with a framework and the GNV emblems, but the work was delayed due to the fire, forcing the ship to return to service with a stripped-down funnel. Work on the funnel finally resumed during the following technical stop, also carried out in Marseille, in 2021.

On December 12, 2025, the General Directorate for Internal Security (DGSI) detained two crew members on suspicion of espionage and cybercrime. While the ship was docked in Sète, a computer system capable of remote control was discovered on board. The vessel was sealed off and then allowed to sail again after an investigation showed that passenger safety was no longer at risk. Italian authorities had alerted French authorities and identified the two crew members, a Latvian and a Bulgarian, suspected of acting for a foreign power. The Bulgarian was released, but the Latvian was detained for conspiracy and computer hacking.

== Facilities ==
=== Public facilities ===
The Fantastic offers its passengers a variety of facilities during the crossing, primarily located on decks 6 and 9. The ship features two bars, three restaurants, a swimming pool, a shop, a casino, a wellness center, a video game arcade, a children's playroom, four lounges, and a conference center. Some of these facilities may be closed during certain sailings.

Among the ship's facilities are:

- The Ducal: The vast main lounge bar located at the bow of the ship on deck 6, entertainment is offered there depending on the crossings;
- The Obelisk: The piano bar located on deck 6 in the middle of the ship;
- The Atlantic Cafe: The pool bar located at the stern of the ship on deck 6;
- The America: The ship's self-service restaurant located in the middle on deck 6;
- Le Caprice: The ship's restaurant located at the stern on deck 6;
- The Plaza Arcade: The ship's shopping arcade located in the middle of deck 6;
- The Dream Machine: the casino located in the middle of deck 6 near the Plaza Arcade lounge bar;
- The lounge chairs: they are located on deck 9 in the middle of the ship and are available to passengers without cabins.

=== Cabins ===
The Fantastic has 373 cabins located on decks 7 and 8. Able to accommodate up to four people and all equipped with full bathrooms, 36 of them are luxury suites.

== Features ==
The Fantastic is 188.22 meters long and 27.60 meters wide, with a draft of 6.81 meters. Its gross tonnage is 35,222 GT. The ship can accommodate 2,033 passengers and has a garage with space for 760 vechiles spread over four levels, accessible via three aft ramps. It is fully air-conditioned. It is powered by four Sulzer France 8ZA40S semi-high-speed diesel engines, developing 25,920 kW of power, driving two Lips controllable-pitch propellers, enabling the vessel to reach speeds of over 23 knots. It is also equipped with a bow thruster and a roll stabilizer with two retractable fins. The ship carries six large enclosed lifeboats, numerous life rafts, a rescue boat, and a rigid inflatable boat, completing its rescue equipment.

== Routes served ==
For Grandi Navi Veloci, the Fantastic served on the Genoa - Porto Torres and Genoa - Barcelona routes at the beginning of its career.

Currently, the ship is in service on Genoa - Barcelona - Tangier, Sète - Tangier or Genoa - Tunis depending on the period.
