= Hospital ships designated for the COVID-19 pandemic =

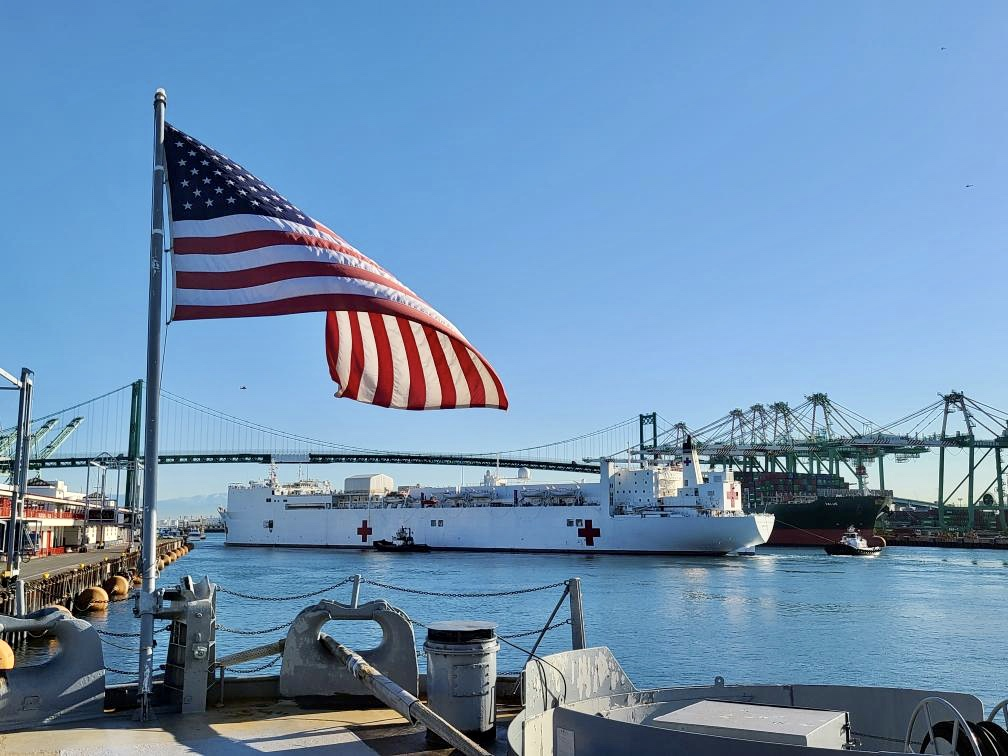
USNS Mercy arrives in Los Angeles, California on 27 March 2020

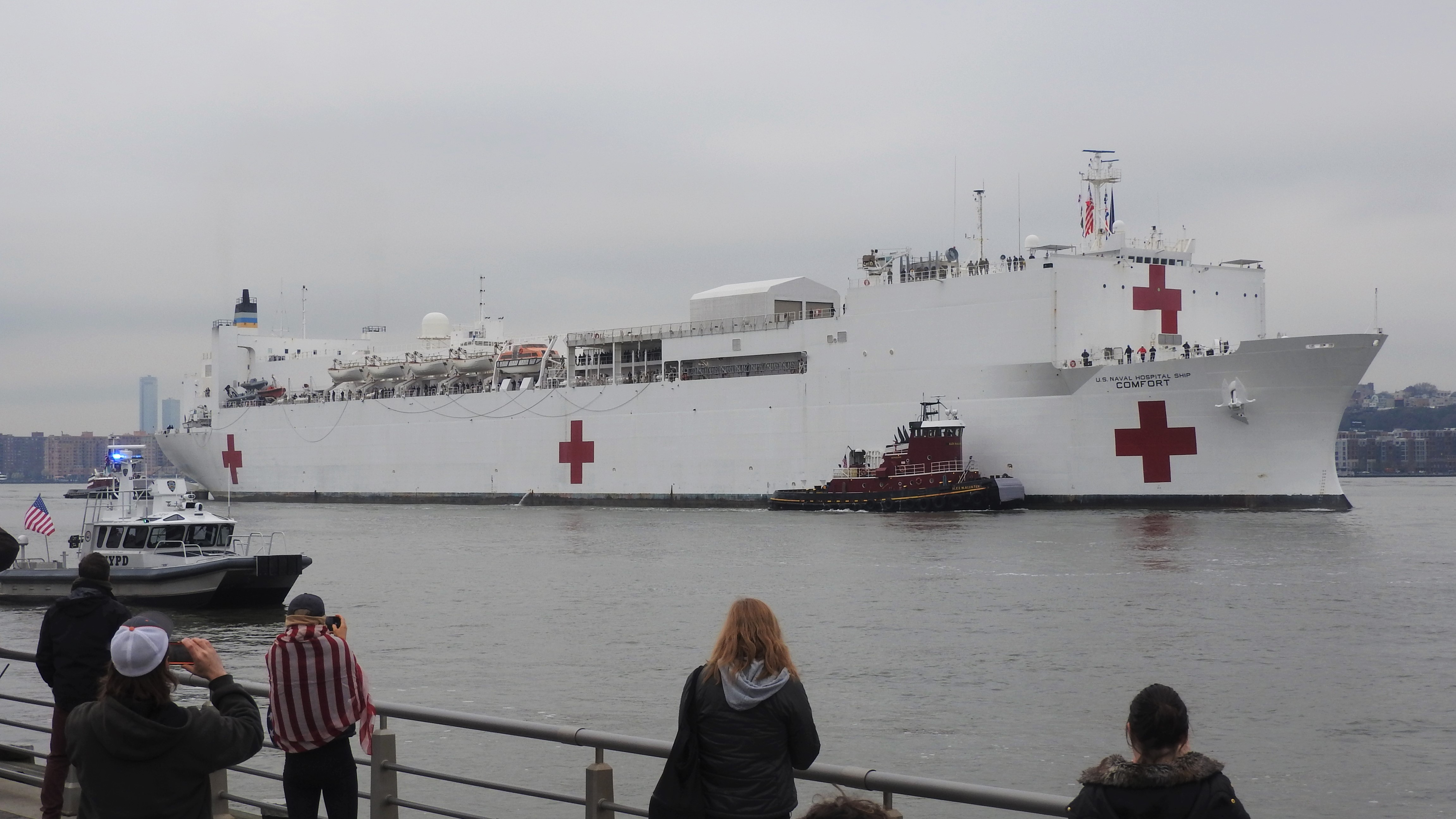
USNS Comfort heading up the Hudson River

In connection with the COVID-19 pandemic, navies from several countries deployed hospital ships to combat the disease. Aside from providing health services, hospital ships would allow civilian hospitals to offload some of the patients, relieving the pressure on facilities ashore. However, this also means that each ship would battle the onboard outbreaks of their own.

As the infections have slowed or fallen short of worst-case predictions, the hospital ships became unused or barely used.

== KRI dr. Soeharso ==
The Indonesian Navy KRI dr. Soeharso picked up 188 Indonesian crew of the cruise ship World Dream in the Durian Strait on 26 February 2020. The vessel took them to Sebaru Kecil Islet and placed under quarantine.

dr. Soeharso evacuated 89 crew of the cruise ship Diamond Princess from Indramayu thermal power plant port, after the crew got health certificate from Japan and flew to Kertajati International Airport. They then used buses to travel to port. The crew underwent a second round of test, of which one crew member had a positive result for COVID-19 and was hospitalized in Jakarta. 68 crew of Diamond Princess disembarked at Sebaru Kecil Islet. World Dream evacuees and Diamond Princess evacuees were housed at separated different blocks/buildings.

== KRI Semarang ==
The Indonesian Navy KRI Semarang transported 68 crews of the Diamond Princess who underwent observation for the coronavirus disease 2019 in Sebaru Kecil Islet to the Port of Tanjung Priok, North Jakarta, on 15 March 2020. She transported hand sanitizers from Singapore to Batam on 9 April 2020. On 18 May 2020, she was dispatched to carry COVID-19 testing kits and hand sanitizers from Yayasan Temasek Singapura, Singapore, to Indonesia.

== USNS Mercy ==
USNS Mercy was deployed to Los Angeles to provide hospital relief from the COVID-19 pandemic. The ship arrived and docked at the Port of Los Angeles cruise ship terminal on 27 March 2020. Her mission was to treat patients other than those with COVID-19, freeing up land-based hospitals to deal with the virus, similar to how USNS Comfort deployed in New York. As of 14 April, 2020, seven crew members have tested positive for the virus and been removed from the ship for quarantine, along with 100 other sailors who had contact with them. As of 15 April, Mercy had treated 48 patients, of whom 30 have been discharged. The ship departed Los Angeles on 15 May.

=== Related nearby train derailment ===
On 31 March, while the ship was docked, a Pacific Harbor Line freight train was derailed, with the wreckage coming to a stop just 230 m (250 yd) from the ship. In an apparent "bizarre attempt to expose a perceived conspiracy", the derailment was intentionally caused by the train engineer who told police that he was suspicious of the vessel and believed the ship was not "what they say it's for." No one was injured and the ship was not harmed; the engineer was charged with train wrecking.

== USNS Comfort ==
Comfort began deployment from Norfolk, Virginia, to New York Harbor on 28 March 2020 to help deal with the impact of the COVID-19 pandemic. Comfort arrived in New York on 30 March, and docked at Pier 90. Although the ship has 1,100 personnel and a capacity of 1,000 beds, as of 3 April it was treating only 22 patients; the low figure was attributable to "bureaucratic obstacles and military procedures."

The ship's stated mission was, originally, to treat patients who did not have COVID-19, freeing up land-based hospitals to focus on patients with the virus, and originally required a patient to test negative for the coronavirus before boarding, but on 3 April changed its process to no longer requires a negative test and to accept "asymptomatic, screened patients who will be isolated and tested immediately upon arrival." On 3 April, multiple patients with the virus spent the night aboard the ship after they were accidentally transferred to the ship from the Jacob K. Javits Center, where a field hospital was in operation; the patients were transferred back to the Javits Center after testing positive for the virus."

On 17 April it was announced that "the USNS COMFORT is prepared to admit patients within a one-hour traveling radius from the ship," and preparations were made to receive coronavirus patients from the Philadelphia area. The ship has removed half its 1000 beds so that it could isolate and treat coronavirus patients. On 21 April, Governor Cuomo told President Trump that the ship was no longer needed in New York. While docked in the city, it treated 179 patients.

== Splendid ==
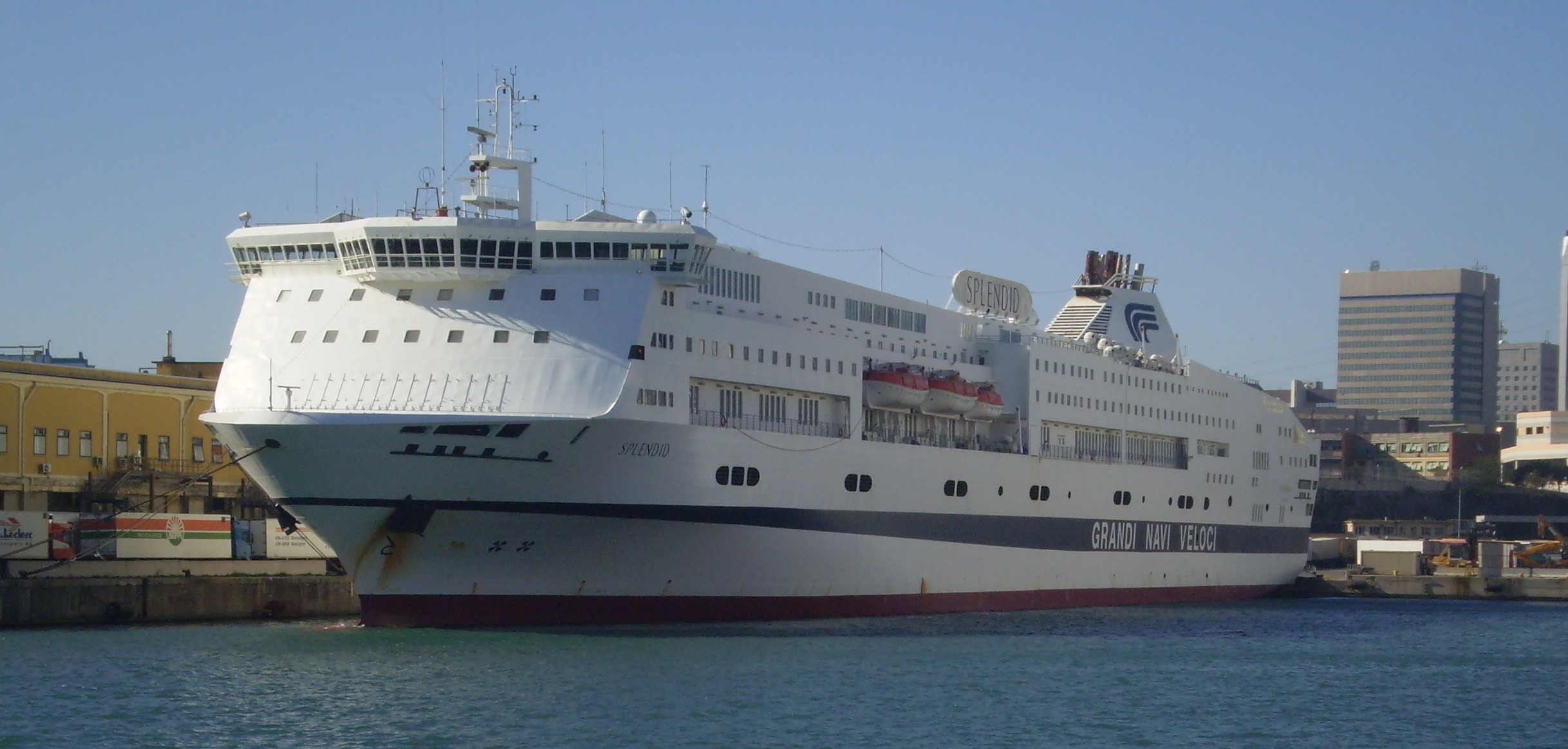
Splendid in 2007

Mediterranean Shipping Company's Grandi Navi Veloci converted one of their ferries, Splendid, into a hospital ship in order to treat coronavirus patients. The ship was delivered to Liguria, Italy, on 23 March 2020, and was made available for the symbolic cost of 1 EUR. With help from Registro Italiano Navale and a number of local and national companies, many of which donated their time, materials, and expertise, Splendid was converted into a hospital ship in roughly 10 days. Docked at Genoa's Ponte Colombo, the hospital ship is currently treating only coronavirus patients without serious pathologies, such as patients recovering after having been previously intubated.

== BRP Ang Pangulo ==
On 3 April 2020, President Rodrigo Duterte of the Philippines ordered the conversion of BRP Ang Pangulo of the Philippine Navy (PN) to accommodate COVID-19 patients. The presidential yacht was used as a 28-bed capacity isolation facility for military frontline workers during the COVID-19 pandemic.

On 30 April 2021, the PN has announced that the Ang Pangulo was prepared to admit coronavirus patients. The ship was docked at Pier 13, Manila South Harbor.

As of 22 January 2022, the PN announced that the ship was able to extend medical aid to a total of 2,450 patients in Siargao and the Dinagat Islands as part of its humanitarian missions in the area.
