= MS La Superba =

Cruise ferry operated by Grandi Navi Veloci

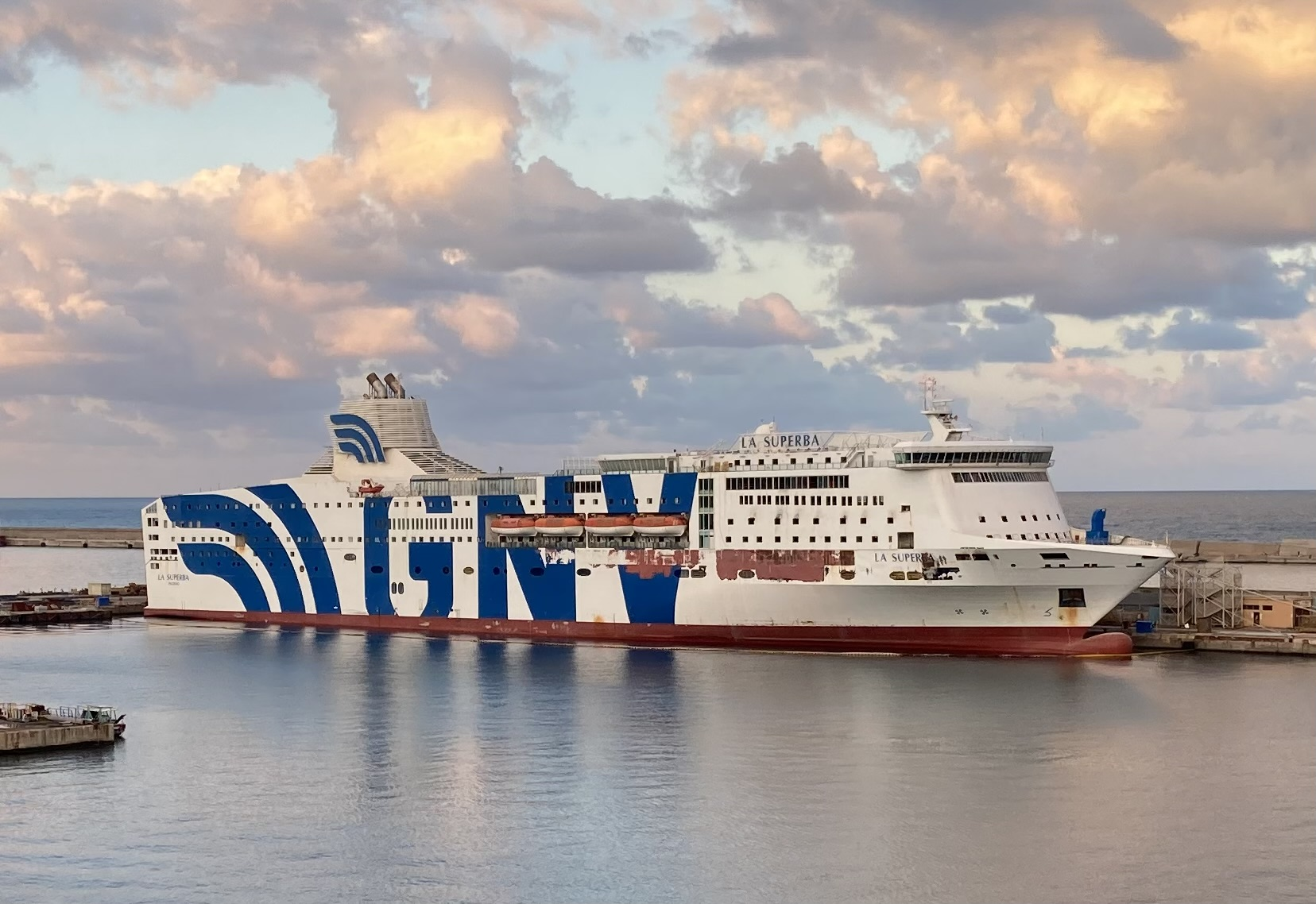
- La Superba in Palermo

History
- Name: La Superba
- Owner: Grandi Navi Veloci
- Operator: Grandi Navi Veloci
- Port of registry: Palermo, Italy
- Builder: Nuovi Cantieri Apuania, Marina di Carrara, Italy
- Yard number: 1220
- Laid down: 29 January 2000
- Launched: 26 May 2001
- Completed: 18 March 2002
- In service: 2002–2024
- Identification: Call sign: ICGK; IMO number: 9214276; MMSI number: 247056100
- Fate: Scrapped in 2025

General characteristics
- Type: Cruiseferry
- Tonnage: 49,257 GT
- Length: 211.5 m (693 ft 11 in)
- Beam: 30.4 m (99 ft 9 in)
- Draught: 7.5 m (24 ft 7 in)
- Installed power: 4 × Wärtsilä 16V46C; 67,200 kW (combined)
- Speed: 30 knots (56 km/h; 35 mph)
- Capacity: 2,920 passengers; 1,000 vehicles

MS La Superba was a cruiseferry owned and operated by the Italian ferry company Grandi Navi Veloci. It was built at Nuovi Cantieri Apuania in Marina di Carrara, Italy. When it entered service, La Superba was the largest passenger ferry operating in the Mediterranean, and one of the largest in the world; joined in the following year by the sistership La Suprema, it was surpassed in 2008 by Cruise Roma of Grimaldi Ferries. Its building costed about 120 million dollars.

The ship could carry 2,920 passengers accommodated in 567 cabins and 940 seats and 1,000 cars on four garages, with a total capacity of 2,800 linear meters of cargo. Services on board include one à la carte restaurant and a self-service restaurant with 404 and 402 seats, respectively, six bars, including a panoramic bar, swimming pools, gym, Jacuzzi, shops, boutiques, slot machines, card rooms, lounges for reading, theater, cinema, a disco with 176 places and a chapel. Of the 567 cabins, 31 are double suites, 6 are presidential suites with balconies and 4 are equipped for disabled passengers.

The ship was equipped with four Wärtsilä 16V46C engines, that develop a total output of 67,200 kW. Propelled by two propellers with four blades, it can reach a top speed of about 30 knots. The ship is fitted with two bow thrusters for a total power of 1500 kW, while the electric current and on-board services are provided by four Wärtsilä generators which develop an aggregate 9,360 kW.

La Superba was launched at Nuovi Cantieri Apuania in June 2001. After sea trials in December of that year, in March 2002 the ship was delivered to Grandi Navi Veloci, entering service between Genoa and Olbia. In the following years, the ship and her sister ship La Suprema were employed on different lines served by GNV, including the Genoa–Palermo route. Occasionally La Superba was also used for mini-cruises in the Mediterranean, especially in the New Year period.

On 17 September 2004, around 20:00 hours, La Superba rammed Tirrenia's ferry Nuraghes while mooring in Olbia harbour. Nuraghes suffered damage to the bow, the bridge, and part of the stern; a lifeboat fell into the sea, while an inflatable raft remained hanging in midair. The accident was blamed on the command of La Superba, which did not require the support of a tug boat despite the bad weather.

On 22 December 2009 La Superba, while moored in Genoa harbour, suffered a fire in the engine room. The fire was quickly put out by the crew, and the 1,570 passengers aboard were transferred to another ferry for the trip to Palermo.

In February 2008, the Vietnamese Vinashin shipping company contracted with GNV to purchase both ships at the end of the summer, but the high cost for the sale ended the negotiations. La Superba and La Suprema remain in service for GNV, sailing on the routes between Sicily and Tunisia; La Superba is currently operated on the Genoa–Tunis route.

In June 2023 a fire broke out on La Superba in Palermo port. At the time she was employed on the route between Naples to Palermo.

In July 2025 the vessel was beached at Aliağa for demolition.

== See also ==
- Largest ferries of Europe
