= Grandi Navi Veloci =

Italian ferry operator

Grandi Navi Veloci S.p.A.
- Type: Società per azioni
- Industry: Transport
- Founded: 1992
- Area served: Mediterranean Sea
- Parent: MSC Group
- Website: www.gnv.it/en

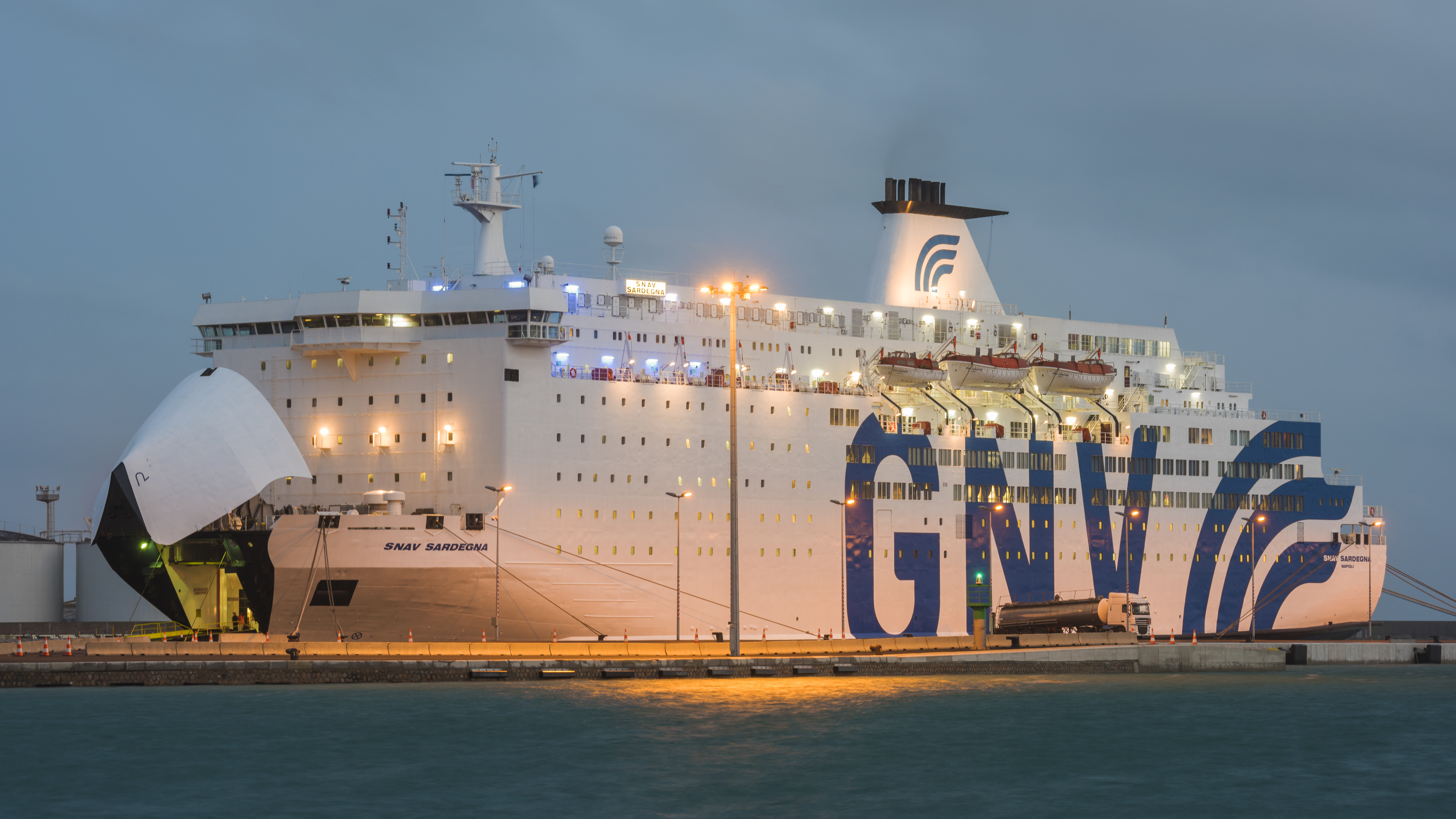
SNAV Sardegna in Sète

Grandi Navi Veloci (GNV) is an Italian shipping company, based in Genoa, that operates ferries between mainland Italy, Sicily, Sardinia, France, Spain, Albania, Morocco and Tunisia. It was established by Aldo Grimaldi in 1992.

== History ==
GNV was created in 1992 by Aldo Grimaldi, initially as a subsidiary of Grimaldi Group. The first ship of the company, Majestic, entered service in 1993 on the Genoa-Palermo route, followed in 1994 by the sistership Splendid on the Genoa-Porto Torres route. Majestic and Splendid were the first cruiseferries ever operated by an Italian company.

The fleet was enlarged with new cruise ferries through the 1990s, and in 2000 the company went public. New routes were added, including Livorno-Palermo, Genoa-Olbia and Genoa-Barcelona. In 2002 and 2003 the new, large cruise ferries La Superba and La Suprema entered service. Lines for Tunisia, as well a new Civitavecchia-Palermo line, were opened.

In 2008 the fleet was enlarged with three ro-ro cargo ships, Audacia, Tenacia, and Coraggio, and a new Genoa-Barcelona-Tangier line was opened. In 2009, GNV became fully independent from the Grimaldi family and Grimaldi Group. In 2010 the company was acquired by the MSC Group; in the same year, GNV merged with SNAV, also a subsidiary of MSC. In 2012, following the ceasing of the services by Comarit and Comanav, GNV opened new lines between Sète, Tangier and Nador. In 2015, GNV opened a new line between Italy and Albania.

The company, As of 2018, currently operates a fleet of thirteen cruise ferries, including some of the largest ferries in Europe. Its CEO is Matteo Catani.

== Coronavirus pandemic ==
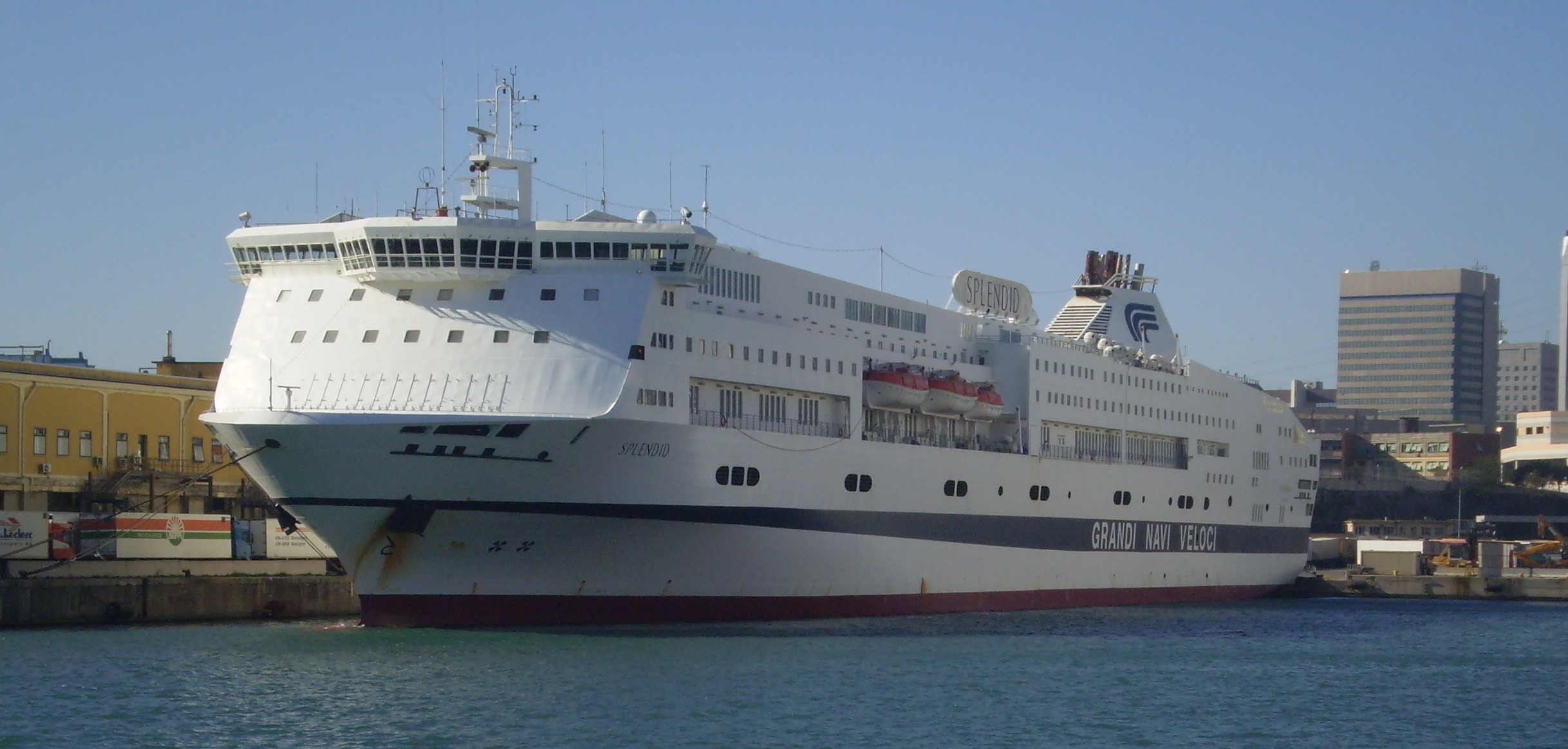
Splendid in 2007.

Grandi Navi Veloci converted one of their ferries, the Splendid, into a hospital ship in order to treat coronavirus patients. The ship was delivered to Liguria, Italy, on 23 March 2020, and was made available for the symbolic cost of 1 EUR. With help from Registro Italiano Navale and a number of local and national companies, many of which donated their time, materials, and expertise, Splendid was converted into a hospital ship in roughly 10 days. Docked at Genoa's Ponte Colombo, the hospital ship is currently treating only coronavirus patients without serious pathologies, such as patients recovering after having been previously intubated.

== Fleet ==
=== Current fleet ===
Ship	Flag	Built	Entered service	Gross tonnage	Length	Width	Passengers	Vehicles	Knots	Image
Majestic	(Italy)	1993	1993	32,777 GT	188.2 m	27.6 m	1,790	760	21	
Splendid	(Italy)	1994	1994	39,139 GT	214.5 m	27.6 m	2,200	1,010	21	
Fantastic	(Italy)	1996	1996	35,222 GT	188.2 m	27.6 m	2,033	760	21	
Excellent	(Italy)	1998	1998	39,777 GT	202.2 m	28 m	2,230	760	24	
Excelsior	(Italy)	1999	1999	39,777 GT	202.2 m	28 m	2,253	760	24	
La Suprema	(Italy)	2003	2003	49,257 GT	211.5 m	30.4 m	2,920	984	28	
GNV Cristal	(Italy)	1989	2013	33,336 GT	161.3 m	29 m	2,000	575	18	
Rhapsody	(Italy)	1996	2015	37,768 GT	161.8 m	38.8 m	2,448	716	23.5	
GNV Blu	(Italy)	1989	2017	31,910 GT	164.4 m	27.6 m	1,320	455	19.5	
GNV Allegra	(Italy)	1987	2019	31,914 GT	166.3 m	28.4 m	1,458	580	21.5	
Tenacia	(Italy)	2008	2020	26,005 GT	199 m	26.6 m	500	600	24	
Forza	(Italy)	2010	2020	25,530 GT	199 m	26.6 m	500	600	24	
GNV Sealand	(Italy)	2009	2009	26,904 GT	186.5 m	25.6 m	830	200	24	
GNV Spirit	(Italy)	2001	2022	32,728 GT	203.9 m	25 m	1,595	712	28	
GNV Sirio	(Italy)	2004	2024	39,798 GT	214 m	26.4 m	2,908	1,080	27.5	
GNV Auriga	(Italy)	2005	2024	39,798 GT	214 m	26.4 m	2,908	1,080	27.5	
GNV Polaris	(Italy)	2024	2024	49,428 GT	218 m	29.6 m	1,500	1,360	25	
GNV Orion	(Italy)	2025	2025	52,000 GT	218 m	29.6 m	1,785	1,360	25	
GNV Virgo	(Italy)	2025	2025	52,000 GT	218 m	29.6	1,785	1,360	25	
GNV Altair	(Italy)	2002	2026	35,736 GT	214 m	26.4 m	2,700	900	29.5	
GNV Aurora	(Italy)	2026	2026	52,000 GT	218 m	29.6 m	1,785	1,360	25	
GNV Phoenix	(Italy)	2003	2026	35,736 GT	214 m	26.4 m	2,700	900	29.5	
GNV Pegasus	(Italy)	2001	2026	35,736 GT	214 m	26.4 m	2,700	900	29.5	

=== Former Fleet ===
Ship	Flag	Built	Entered Service	Gross Tonnage	Length	Width	Passengers	Vechiles	Knots	Image
Victory	(Italy)	1989	1998	28,112	187.13	27	950	550	23.5	
La Superba	(Italy)	2002	2002	49,270	211.50	30.40	3,000	1.000	28	
GNV Aries	(Togo)	1987	2021	31,785	179	25	950	850	19	
GNV Antares	(Portugal)	1987	2021	31,785	179	25	950	850	19	
GNV Azzurra	(Italy)	1981	2013	29,706 GT	168.5 m	24.5 m	2,180	570	17	
GNV Atlas	(Italy)	1990	2013	33,336 GT	161.3 m	29 m	2,000	575	18	

== Accidents and incidents ==
- On 31 October 2018, a 8:00am local time, the Excellent crashed into the Port of Barcelona (ESBCN) after a gust of wind drove it into the cargo pier, smashing into a gantry crane, which tipped over onto containers holding flammable chemicals, which caught fire, causing toxic smoke, and setting the pier ablaze. The Excellent had been trying to dock, but was prevented from doing so due to bad weather.
