= Splendid (ship) =

Cruise ferry built in Italy

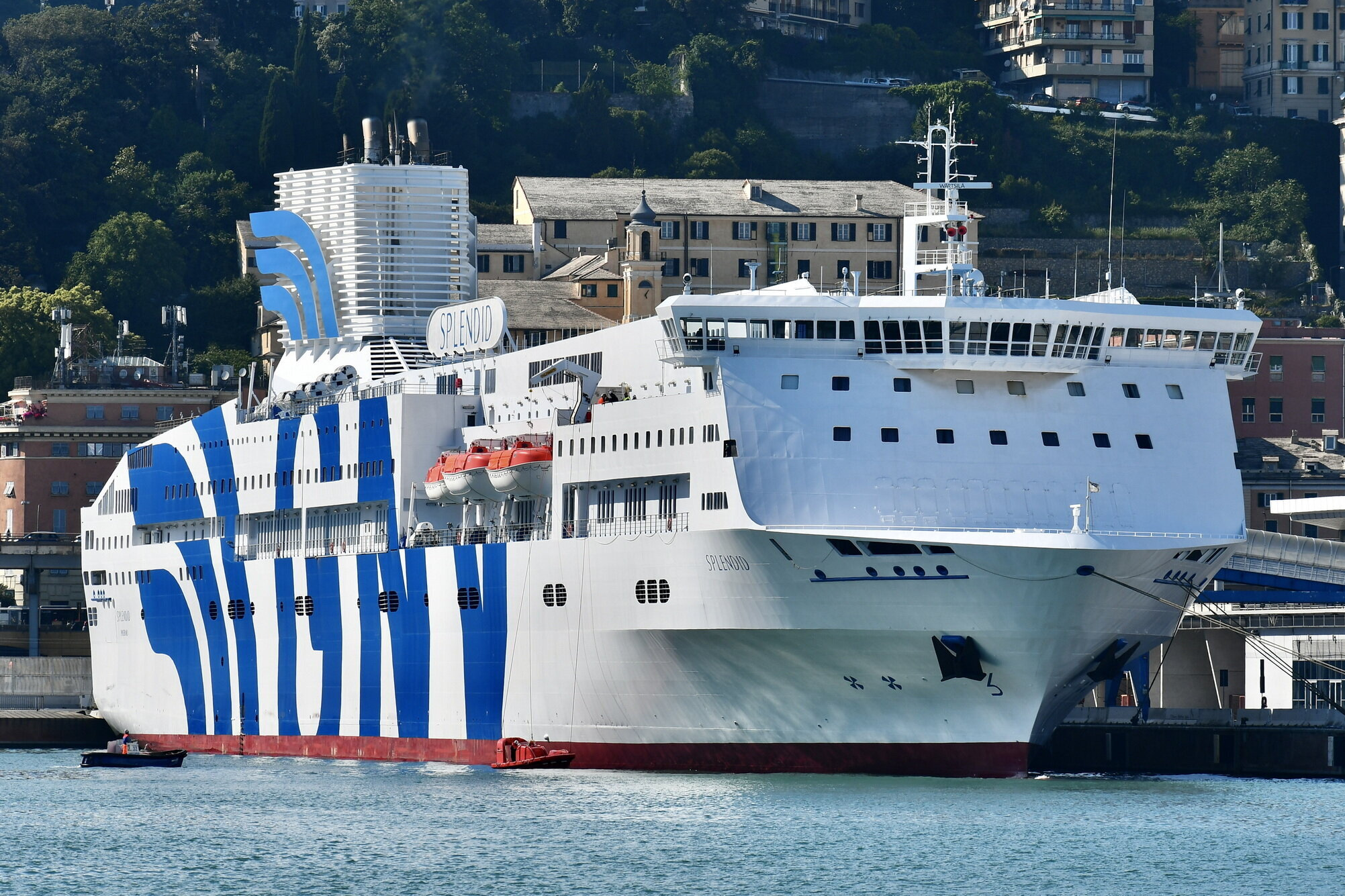
- Splendid in Genova

History
- Name: 1994–present: Splendid
- Owner: 1994–present: Grandi Navi Veloci (GNV) (MSC Group)
- Operator: 1994–present: Grandi Navi Veloci (GNV)
- Port of registry: 1994–present: Palermo, Italy
- Route: Genoa – Palermo; Genoa – Tunis; Civitavecchia – Palermo; Sète – Tanger Med
- Ordered: 1991
- Builder: Nuovi Cantieri Apuania; Marina di Carrara, Italy
- Yard number: 1160
- Laid down: 1992
- Launched: 18 December 1993
- Completed: May 1994
- Acquired: 1994
- Maiden voyage: May 1994
- In service: 1994
- Identification: IMO number: 9015747; Call sign: IBDD; MMSI number: 247143000
- Status: in service
- Notes: Lengthened in 1996 by 26 metres at Fincantieri Palermo; served as a hospital ship in Genoa during the COVID-19 pandemic in 2020.

General characteristics
- Class & type: Extended Majestic-class Cruise Ferry
- Tonnage: 39,139 GT (originally 33,057 GT); 7,200 DWT
- Length: 214.50 m (703 ft 9 in) (originally 188.15 m (617 ft 3 in))
- Beam: 27.60 m (90 ft 7 in)
- Draught: 6.80 m (22 ft 4 in)
- Depth: 8.30 m (27 ft 3 in)
- Decks: 10
- Ramps: Bow and stern loading ramps
- Installed power: 4 × Sulzer 8ZA40S main diesel engines (total 25,920 kW / 35,240 hp)
- Propulsion: 2 × controllable pitch propellers
- Speed: 23.0 knots (42.6 km/h; 26.5 mph) (service) / 24.5 knots (45.4 km/h; 28.2 mph) (max)
- Capacity: 2,200 passengers (462 cabins / 1,732 berths); 1,010 cars / 2,250 lane metres for freight
- Crew: 90–120

Splendid is a 214.50-metre Ro-Pax cruise ferry owned and operated by Grandi Navi Veloci (GNV). Built in 1994 by Nuovi Cantieri Apuania in Marina di Carrara, Italy, she is the second vessel constructed for GNV and the sister ship to lead vessel Majestic. Originally completed at 188.15 metres, she was lengthened by 26 metres at Fincantieri's Palermo shipyard in 1996 to increase passenger and freight capacity. Powered by four Sulzer main diesel engines producing 25,920 kW, she operates key Tyrrhenian and Western Mediterranean routes connecting mainland Italy and France with Sicily, Sardinia, Tunisia, and Morocco.

== History ==
=== Origins and construction ===
In 1992, a new shipping company, Grandi Navi Veloci, was founded in Genoa by the Italian shipowner Aldo Grimaldi. Even before its launch, Grimaldi ordered two ships to be operated by the new company. The first, the Majestic, entered service in 1993 on the Genoa- Palermo route. The second ship, named Splendid, was designed as a sister ship to the Majestic and was intended to sail between Genoa and Sardinia. Its construction began shortly after the launch of its twin at the Nuovi Cantieri Apunia shipyard in Marina di Carrara. The ship was launched on December 18, 1993, then completed a few months later. It was delivered to Grandi Navi Veloci in June 1994.

=== Service ===
The Splendid was put into service in June 1994, initially between Genoa and Palermo and then, from July, towards Porto Torres. Just like the Majestic, the ship was a real success, so much so that in 1995, a mini-cruise was organised between Genoa, Palermo, Valletta and Tunis.

In 1996, the company's success nevertheless presented some challenges. Despite the commissioning of the slightly larger Fantastic in June, the fleet was fully booked throughout the summer. Rather than building a twin of the Fantastic, GNV opted to lengthen the Splendid, which would prove less expensive and faster than constructing a new ship. In December, the Splendid entered the Fincantieri shipyards in Palermo; the cruise ferry was then cut in two and a new 25.97-meter section of its hull was added. In 2003, the ship inaugurated international routes to Tunisia.

On May 23, 2013, the Splendid is taking part in the commemoration of the 21st anniversary of the assassination of Giovanni Falcone. On this occasion, a mini-cruise is being organized between Civitavecchia, Naples and Palermo with the participation of three thousand children.

On July 19, 2015, between Palermo and Civitavecchia, a passenger broke his femur. The ship returned to Palermo to disembark the injured man. In 2016, the Splendid was repainted in GNV's new colours.

During its technical stop in Genoa in January and March 2020, the ship is equipped with scrubbers, a fume purification system that reduces CO2 emissions. However, the installation of this device requires modifications to the cruise-ferry's funnel, which is completely rebuilt and now appears taller than originally.

On March 11, 2020, to address the lack of hospital beds in Northern Italy due to the rapid progression of the pandemic, GNV management proposed the conversion of one or more cruise ferries into hospital ships. This proposal was immediately agreed upon with the mayor of Genoa Marco Bucci, with the president of the Liguria region Giovanni Toti and with the management of the Italian Naval Registry.

The first ship made available at the symbolic price of €1 was the Splendid itself, which was moored at the Genoa ferry terminal. The conversion, with the aim of obtaining 400 beds, took place very quickly (less than a week) thanks to a solidarity group of various companies whose work led to, by 19 March, the replacement of the carpet with sanitary linoleum flooring, 25 single cabins for the exclusive use of patients, all now configured with totally independent external ventilation, the necessary sanitary measures, private bathroom and equipped with television and Internet connection. Furthermore, the large garage can be transformed into a resuscitation and intensive care unit with the aid of modular units. The ship thus transformed became operational on 23 March 2020. After completing its service as a hospital ship, it returned to service for GNV on the connections between Genoa, Civitavecchia, Palermo and Tunisia.

From 20 February to 23 May 2021 it was chartered by the Ministry of the Interior and used as a quarantine ship as part of the emergency landings in Trapani.

== Facilities ==
=== Public facilities ===
The Splendid offers its passengers a variety of facilities during the crossing, primarily located on decks 6 and 9. The ship has two bars, two restaurants, a swimming pool, a shop, a casino, a wellness center, a video game area, a children's playroom, several lounges, and a conference center. Some of these facilities may be closed during certain crossings.

Among the ship's facilities are:

- The Sky Bar: The large main lounge bar located at the bow of the ship on deck 6, entertainment is offered there depending on the crossings;
- The Baccara: The piano bar located on deck 6 in the middle of the ship;
- The Gelataria: The pool bar located at the stern of the ship on deck 7;
- The Italia: The ship's self-service restaurant located in the middle on deck 6;
- The Pavilion: The ship's restaurant located at the stern on deck 6;
- The Plaza Arcade: The ship's shopping arcade located in the middle of deck 6;
- The Dream Machine: the casino located in the middle of deck 6 near the Baccara lounge bar;
- The lounge chairs: they are located on deck 9 in the middle of the ship and are available to passengers without cabins.

=== Cabins ===
The Splendid has 456 cabins located on decks 7 and 8. Able to accommodate up to four people and all equipped with full bathrooms, 27 of them are luxury suites.

== Features ==
Upon its commissioning, the Splendid measured 188.15 meters in length and 27.60 meters in width, with a draft of 6.70 meters. Its gross tonnage was 32,731 GT. Following its jumboization in 1996, the length was increased to 214.12 meters, the draft to 6.40 meters, and the tonnage to 39,139 GT. The ship could originally accommodate 1,790 passengers and had a garage with space for 760 vechiles spread over four levels and accessible via three aft ramps. After the 1996 refit, its passenger capacity was increased to 2,200 and its vehicle capacity to 1,010. It is fully air-conditioned. It has four Sulzer 8ZA40S semi-high-speed diesel engines, developing 23,040 kW of power, driving two Lips controllable-pitch propellers, propelling the vessel at speeds exceeding 23 knots. It is also equipped with a bow thruster and a roll stabilizer with two retractable fins. The ship carries four large, enclosed lifeboats, numerous life rafts, a rescue boat, and a rigid inflatable boat, completing its rescue capabilities.

== Routes served ==
For Grandi Navi Veloci, the Splendid served on the Genoa - Porto Torres and Genoa- Palermo routes at the beginning of its career. From 2003, it was assigned to international routes to Tunis.

Since 2007, the ship has been in service on the Civitavecchia - Palermo - Tunis or Genoa - Tunis routes depending on the period.
