= Scrubbers on ships =

Exhaust-cleaning devices

In ship construction, scrubbers, or exhaust gas cleaning systems, are installed on ships to reduce air pollution caused by sulfur oxides (SOx) emitted when burning heavy fuel oil. A prevalent type is the open loop scrubber, which uses seawater to wash exhaust gases and then discharges the resulting polluted washwater directly into the sea. These systems have sparked significant environmental debate due to their impacts on marine ecosystems.

Open loop scrubbers became widespread after the International Maritime Organization (IMO) implemented a global sulfur emissions cap in 2020. They allow ships to continue using less expensive, high-sulfur heavy fuel oil while meeting air quality regulations, shifting the environmental burden from air to water. As of 2022, in some regions like the Baltic Sea, the number of ships fitted with these systems has quadrupled in recent years.

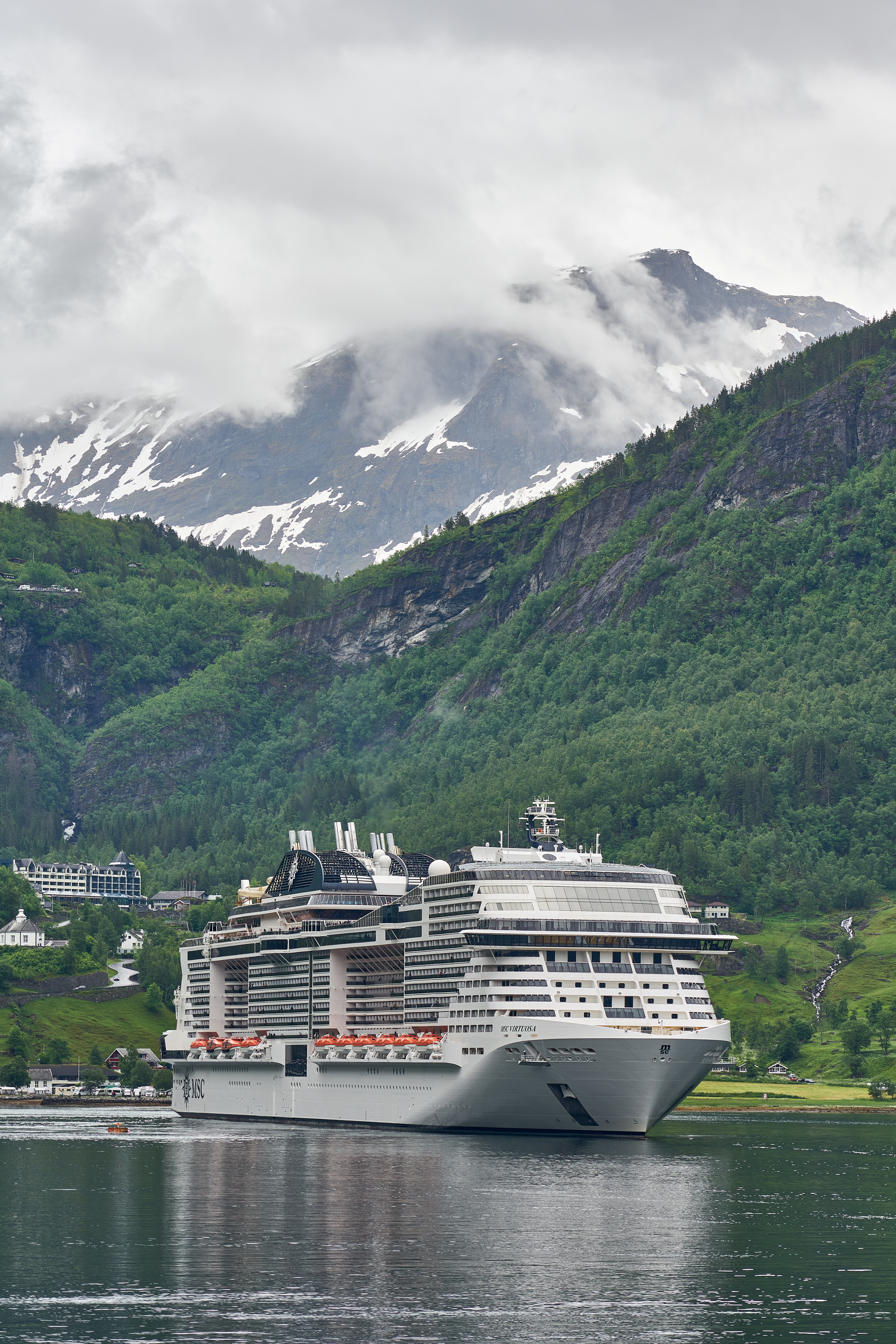
MSC Grandiosa equipped with scrubbers in Norwegian fjord

== Types of scrubbers ==
- Open loop scrubbers use seawater to neutralize SOx in exhaust gases and discharge the used water, now acidic and contaminated, back into the ocean.
- Closed loop scrubbers use a recirculating alkaline solution to remove SOx, storing the wastewater on board for later disposal at port, back into the ocean.
- Hybrid scrubbers can operate in either mode, depending on local regulations and conditions.

== Environmental impacts ==
Open loop scrubbers have been subject to intense scientific scrutiny. Research shows that:

- For every 1 tonne (2,200 lb) of fuel burned, ships with open loop scrubbers can release up to 45 tonnes (99,000 lb) of acidic, contaminated washwater containing heavy metals, polycyclic aromatic hydrocarbons (PAHs), and other toxins into the ocean.
- In the Baltic Sea, open loop scrubber discharge accounts for up to 9% of PAH emissions, which are harmful to aquatic life.
- Scrubber effluent can cause local acidification and increased concentrations of hazardous substances in sediments, affecting marine organisms' development and reproduction.
- Socioeconomic costs of this pollution in the Baltic Sea region alone have been estimated at more than €680 million between 2014 and 2022, not including broader environmental damage.

== Regulatory responses ==
Growing concern over the environmental impact of open loop scrubbers has led to increasing regulatory restrictions. Many ports and jurisdictions have banned or restricted the use of open loop scrubbers in their waters, requiring ships to use either closed loop systems or compliant low-sulfur fuels instead.

== See also ==
- Marine pollution
