= GNV Pegasus =

Ferry built by Fincantieri

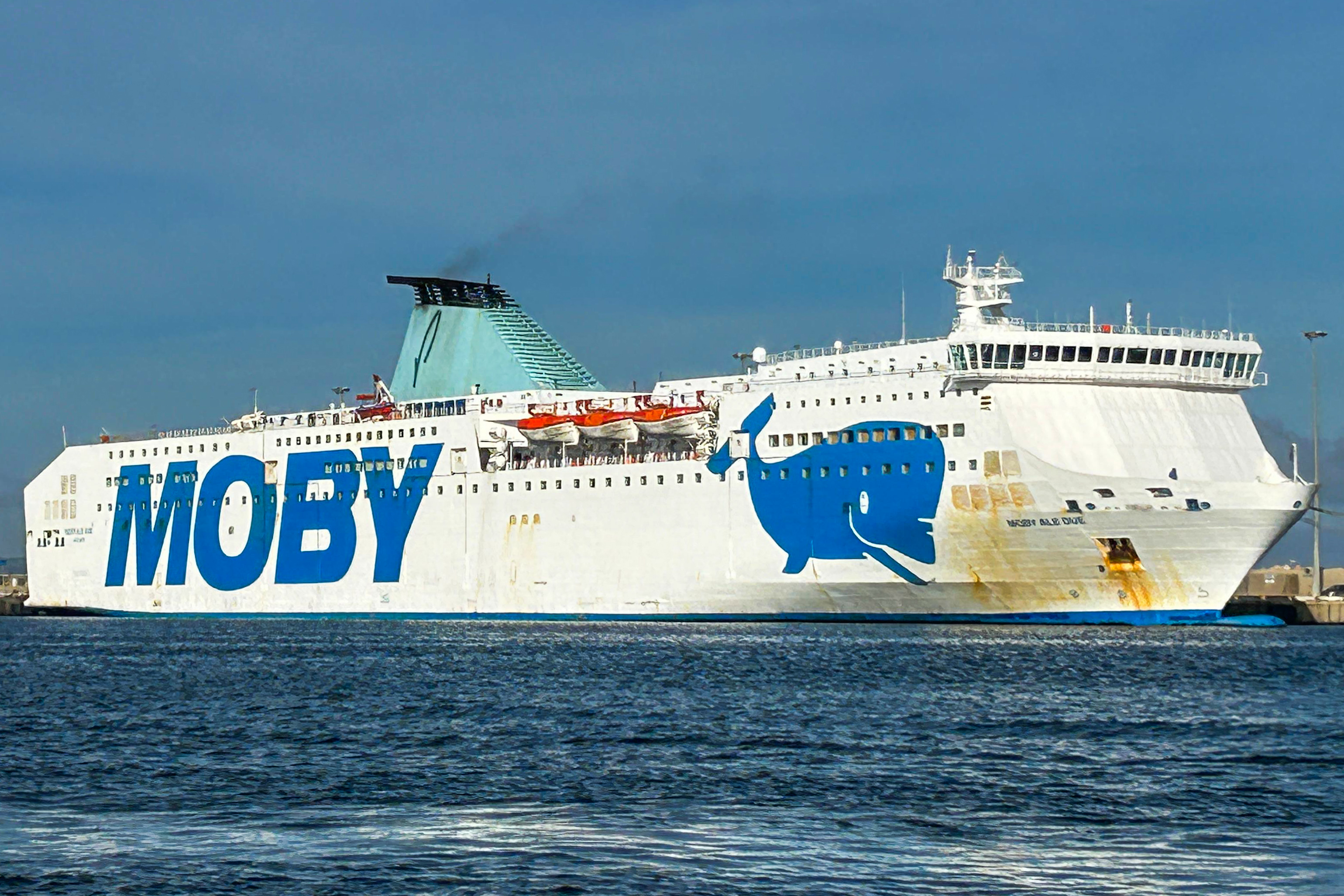
- GNV Pegasus as Moby Ale Due in Porto Torres

History
- Name: 2001–2024: Bithia; 2024–2026: Moby Ale Due; 2026–present: GNV Pegasus
- Owner: 2001–2012: Tirrenia di Navigazione; 2012–2025: Compagnia Italiana di Navigazione (Moby Group); 2025–present: Grandi Navi Veloci (GNV) (MSC Group)
- Operator: 2001–2024: Tirrenia di Navigazione / Moby Lines; 2026–present: Grandi Navi Veloci (Chartered to Adria Ferries)
- Port of registry: 2001–present: Napoli / Genova, Italy
- Route: Bari – Durrës; Former: Genoa – Porto Torres; Former: Civitavecchia – Olbia
- Ordered: 1999
- Builder: Fincantieri; Castellammare di Stabia, Italy
- Yard number: 6069
- Laid down: 2000
- Launched: 2001
- Completed: July 2001
- Acquired: 2025 (by GNV)
- Maiden voyage: 1 August 2001
- In service: 2001
- Identification: IMO number: 9222522; Call sign: IBSU; MMSI number: 247034200
- Status: in service

General characteristics
- Class & type: Bithia-class Fast Ro-Pax Cruise Ferry
- Tonnage: 36,475 GT; 4,600 DWT
- Length: 214.60 m (704 ft 1 in)
- Beam: 26.40 m (86 ft 7 in)
- Draught: 6.60 m (21 ft 8 in)
- Depth: 9.40 m (30 ft 10 in)
- Decks: 8
- Ramps: Stern loading ramps
- Installed power: 4 × Wärtsilä 12V46C main diesel engines (total 51,360 kW / 68,875 hp)
- Propulsion: 2 × controllable pitch propellers
- Speed: 29.5 knots (54.6 km/h; 33.9 mph) (max) / 26.0 knots (48.2 km/h; 29.9 mph) (service)
- Capacity: 2,700 passengers (320 cabins / 1,212 berths); 820 vehicles / 875 lane metres for freight
- Crew: 50–70

GNV Pegasus is a 214.60-metre Fast Ro-Pax cruise ferry owned by Grandi Navi Veloci (MSC Group). Originally built in 2001 by Fincantieri in Castellammare di Stabia, Italy, as Bithia for Tirrenia di Navigazione, she was briefly named Moby Ale Due before being formally renamed GNV Pegasus as part of GNV's major fleet acquisition. Powered by four Wärtsilä-Sulzer diesel engines producing over 51,000 kW, she achieves speeds up to 29.5 knots, serving key Mediterranean and Adriatic routes.

== Characteristics ==
The ship, 214 meters long and approximately 26 meters wide, has a gross tonnage of 36,500 tons, making it one of the largest ferries in Italy. However, these dimensions have created significant problems in some Sardinian ports such as Arbatax and Porto Torres, which have required adaptation work to accommodate the Bithia and its sister ships.

It can accommodate 2,700 passengers and approximately 900 cars on board and has a cargo capacity of 915 linear meters, equivalent to approximately 70 semi-trailers. The Bithia, like its sister ships, can be classified as a cruise ferry: this type of vessel, introduced in Italy by Grandi Navi Veloci in the early 1990s, provides high levels of onboard comfort for passengers, guaranteeing numerous services typical of cruise ships. In fact, Bithia-class ferries like the Bithia are equipped with shops, bars, cinemas and restaurants, while the interior furnishings are quite luxurious. The ships are structured on eight decks, namely:

- Bridge 8 Command Bridge: infirmary, kennel, solarium
- Deck 7 Rainbow Bridge: children's area, 648 second-class seats and 68 cabins
- Deck 6 Boat Deck: Reception, central bar, party room bar, cinema, restaurant, self-service, shop
- Deck 5 Aurora Deck: 257 cabins
- Deck 4 Upper Garage: 373 cars
- Bridge 3 Car-Deck: 80 cars
- Bridge 3 Main Garage: 335 cars or 69 semi-trailers
- Bridge 2 Lower Garage 2: 60 cars
- Bridge 1 Lower Garage 1: 52 cars

Cabins are accessed using smart cards and dedicated readers. This system replaces standard locks to ensure greater passenger safety. The electronic system prevents break-ins. Each cabin has a dedicated bathroom with a sink, shower, and toilet. Given the relatively slow speed and large size of the ferry, passengers can remain outdoors toward the stern or on the two side decks of the Boat Deck (where the lifeboats are also located). In favorable weather conditions, passengers are permitted access above the Bridge Deck, where there is a helicopter landing area and a kennel where animals can sleep in special kennels. Boarding and disembarking takes place through the two stern doors, and foot passengers can board via escalators or elevators that lead directly to the Boat Deck.

The name of this ship is dedicated to a legendary name of Sardinia: in fact Bithia is an ancient Punic city in the south of the island. In 2018 it was painted in a DC Comics livery depicting Superman and Supergirl.

Since February 2024, it has been sporting the new Moby livery and has had its interiors modernized. The company's logo, featuring the blue whale, is on the sides, while the "V-Class" logo is on the light blue funnel.

== History ==
=== Origins and construction ===
In the late 1990s, the state-owned company Tirrenia di Navigazione, the main concessionaire for maritime routes between mainland Italy, Sardinia, and Sicily, launched a major program to renew its fleet in service of territorial continuity. This followed a decision made by the Italian government in September 1998 to dismantle the state-owned holding company Finmare, which notably owns Tirrenia, and eventually privatize all of its subsidiaries. Taking advantage of its final years under state control, the company then planned to put into service several large-capacity vessels to replace the Strade Romane-class ferries on its main routes. It was thus decided to design two new classes of ships, financed by substantial subsidies received under the territorial continuity scheme. Of these two classes, one would be used in Sicily while the other would serve Sardinia.

Regarding the ships intended for service to Sardinia, Tirrenia will opt for the design of semi-fast car ferries inspired by the vessels operated in the Adriatic Sea by the Greek companies Superfast Ferries and Minoan Lines. This type of ship, combining size, capacity, and high speeds, is currently favored by many shipowners in the Mediterranean, and in particular by private competitors such as Moby Lines and Sardinia Ferries, which have already placed orders for fast ferries. In addition to protecting itself against competition from these future ships, the choice of fast car ferries is also consistent with Tirrenia's strategy, which throughout the 1990s focused on speed, notably with the introduction in the Western Mediterranean of the first high-speed ships capable of transporting vehicles in 1993. Initially, the company's project envisioned ships with a very large towing capacity, aiming to capture a portion of the freight traffic transiting to Sardinia. However, the Grimaldi Group, already present in this sector through its subsidiary Grimaldi Ferries, took legal action, alleging unfair competition. Since the public service specifications did not justify the increased towing capacity, Tirrenia's future ships were subject to a limited garage area, equivalent to that of the Strade Romane class ferries, which impacted their design. Despite this constraint, Tirrenia's new ferries boasted particularly impressive dimensions, with a length of 214 meters and a tonnage exceeding 35,000 gross tons. Because of these dimensions, Tirrenia's new units surpass those of Moby or Sardinia Ferries, whose length has been deliberately limited to allow for more versatile operation, particularly in Corsica.

With a passenger capacity of 2,700 people, including over 1,200 in berths, they are the largest ships ever to sail to Sardinia. Thanks to their length, the amenities can be concentrated on a single deck. These include two bars, two restaurants, and entertainment options such as a cinema, game rooms, a library, and a shop, all presented with elegant décor. Despite the limit of approximately 830 linear meters for hauling, they are still capable of transporting 900 vehicles spread across the equivalent of three levels. The main characteristic impacted by this restriction is that freight capacity will be limited to 70 units. Finally, to enable these ships to reach high speeds, their propulsion system will be four Wärtsilä high-speed engines, which at the time were the most sophisticated on the market and were also used by competing vessels. These machines, combined with the hull design incorporating a narrow width relative to the length, will give the ships speeds approaching 30 knots.

With the specifications defined, a first ship was then ordered from the Fincantieri shipyards in Castellammare di Stabia, where Tirrenia's ships were usually built. Named Bithia after the archaeological site of the same name, it was laid down on July 12, 2000 and launched on February 10, 2001. After five months of finishing work, it was delivered to Tirrenia on July 9.

== Service ==
The Bithia was launched by Fincantieri on 10 February 2001 and delivered to Tirrenia on 9 July 2001 and entered into service on 1 August of the same year on the Genoa - Porto Torres route. The quality of the ship was also appreciated by Giuseppe Pisanu, Minister of the Interior at the time, and by Pietro Lunardi, Minister of Infrastructure and Transport. After the fire of the Panam Serena in Porto Torres, the Bithia was diverted for a short period to the Genoa - Olbia route, then switching to operate permanently on the Genoa - Porto Torres route, with an optimal journey time of 10 hours (including embarkation and disembarkation).

In 2011, she moved to the Naples - Palermo route, being temporarily moved from 5 February 2012 to the Civitavecchia - Olbia route to replace her sister ship Sharden. At the end of March, the ship was deployed on the Genoa - Porto Torres route to replace her sister ship Janas, which had gone to Naples for maintenance work.

In 2015, Moby acquired all of CIN's shares, thus becoming the sole owner of Tirrenia. This change was marked a few years later, in 2018, by a significant modification to the ship's livery. Like Moby's ferries, whose hulls are decorated with Looney Tunes cartoon characters, the Tirrenia fleet's vessels were gradually adorned with a similar livery, this time featuring comic book characters from the DC universe.

Subsequently, Bithia, together with her sister ships, will operate on rotation on the routes: Civitavecchia - Olbia, Genoa - Olbia, and Civitavecchia - Arbatax - Cagliari. In the 2019 summer season, she operated on the Genoa - Porto Torres route, and from September 2019, she will be fixed on the Genoa - Olbia route in both winter and summer.

In the 2020 summer season, it entered service on behalf of Moby on the Olbia - Piombino route, generating several complaints due to its constant delays and was therefore transferred back to the Genoa - Olbia - Arbatax route. It returned to service on the Olbia - Piombino on the penultimate day before the closure of the route, also delaying that day. From December 2020, it entered service on the Genoa Porto Torres route together with its sister ship Athara and was replaced on the Genoa - Olbia route by its other sister ship Janas. After the fire on the Athara, it still operates between Genoa and Porto Torres together with Janas.

In early February 2021, the ship headed to Messina for maintenance, remaining in the dock for almost two months. At the end of April, it returned to the Genoa - Porto Torres service, being then replaced by the Athara paired with the Janas. On behalf of Moby, it was inserted into the Genoa - Olbia service in May, also making a day and night voyage between Olbia, Livorno and back to Olbia. On June 2, it was transferred to the Civitavecchia - Olbia service paired with the Moby Tommy. For the summer of 2023, Bithia will sail the Civitavecchia - Olbia route alongside Sharden. In the following months, she will continue on the same route alongside Athara.

From December 21, 2023, to February 7, 2024, at the Genoa shipyards, the livery was changed to Moby and it was renamed Moby Ale Due. The ferry returned to commercial operations on the Civitavecchia - Olbia route from the evening of February 8. From March 17 to May 16, it switched to the Genoa - Porto Torres route, and then switched again to the Civitavecchia - Olbia route alongside its sister ship Janas. From June 26 to July 26, the ship was detained in the port of Ajaccio under seizure, caused by the dispute between the Onorato Armatori group and Siem. The ship subsequently departed Corsica for Genoa and returned to service the following day on the Genoa - Porto Torres route.

On 4 November 2025, after serving on the summer connections between Genoa, Olbia and Porto Torres, the ferry was decommissioned in Piombino. On 3 December 2025, at the end of the auction in which the ferry was on sale together with four other ferries in the fleet, its sale to the MSC group was announced, by which it will be used under the banner of its subsidiary Grandi Navi Veloci with the name of GNV Pegasus, with which it was renamed in the shipyard in Naples, destination for which it left the Tuscan port on 22 February 2026. In June, after a few months of technical stopover in the Neapolitan port, the ferry was chartered to Adria Ferries, GNV 's Adriatic partner, by which it will be used from 15 June on the connections between Bari and Durres with the commercial name of AF Pegasus, replacing its twin GNV Phoenix, initially planned for the route but stopped due to the outbreak of a fire on board. Following this, on June 24, at the end of the works, the ferry set sail from Campania towards the Apulian port, which on the evening of June 28 began to connect to Albania.

== Sister ships ==
- GNV Phoenix
- GNV Altair
