= Tirrenia (company) =

Italian shipping company, 1936–2012

Tirrenia di Navigazione
- Type: Public
- Industry: Transportation
- Founded: 18 December 1936; 89 years ago in Naples, Italy.
- Defunct: 2012
- Fate: State-controlled company until 2012, when it was privatized and transferred to the new Tirrenia - Compagnia Italiana di Navigazione.
- Headquarters: Naples, Italy
- Services: Maritime transportation
- Revenue: 319 million euros (2009)
- Net income: (9.64 million euros (2009))
- Number of employees: (1 639 (2009))
- Website: https://www.tirrenia.it/

Tirrenia di Navigazione was an Italian state-owned shipping company.

== History ==
It was established in 1936 as part of a program of reorganization and rationalization of Italian state-subsidized maritime services, with capital majority subscribed by the state-owned Finmare. The company, which merged the fleets of the liquidated Tirrenia Flotte Riunite Florio - CITRA, Società Adria di Navigazione, and Società Sarda di Navigazione (a total of 53 ships), was assigned cargo and passenger connections in the Tyrrhenian Sea, the western Mediterranean and to Northern Europe.

The almost destruction of the fleet during World War II forced a difficult job of restoring the connections, especially to the Italian islands, which also saw the recovery of several boats sunk during the conflict. In the 1960s and 1970s, following the mass deployment of motorized vehicles, the fleet was substantially renewed by eliminating scheduled cargo and passenger ships in favor of ro-ro ships.

Following the privatization of Lloyd Triestino and Italia di Navigazione in 1998 and the merger of Adriatica di Navigazione into Tirrenia itself in 2004, it remained the last state-owned Finmare company. On 19 July 2012, following a troubled privatization process that began in 2008, it was acquired by Compagnia Italiana di Navigazione.

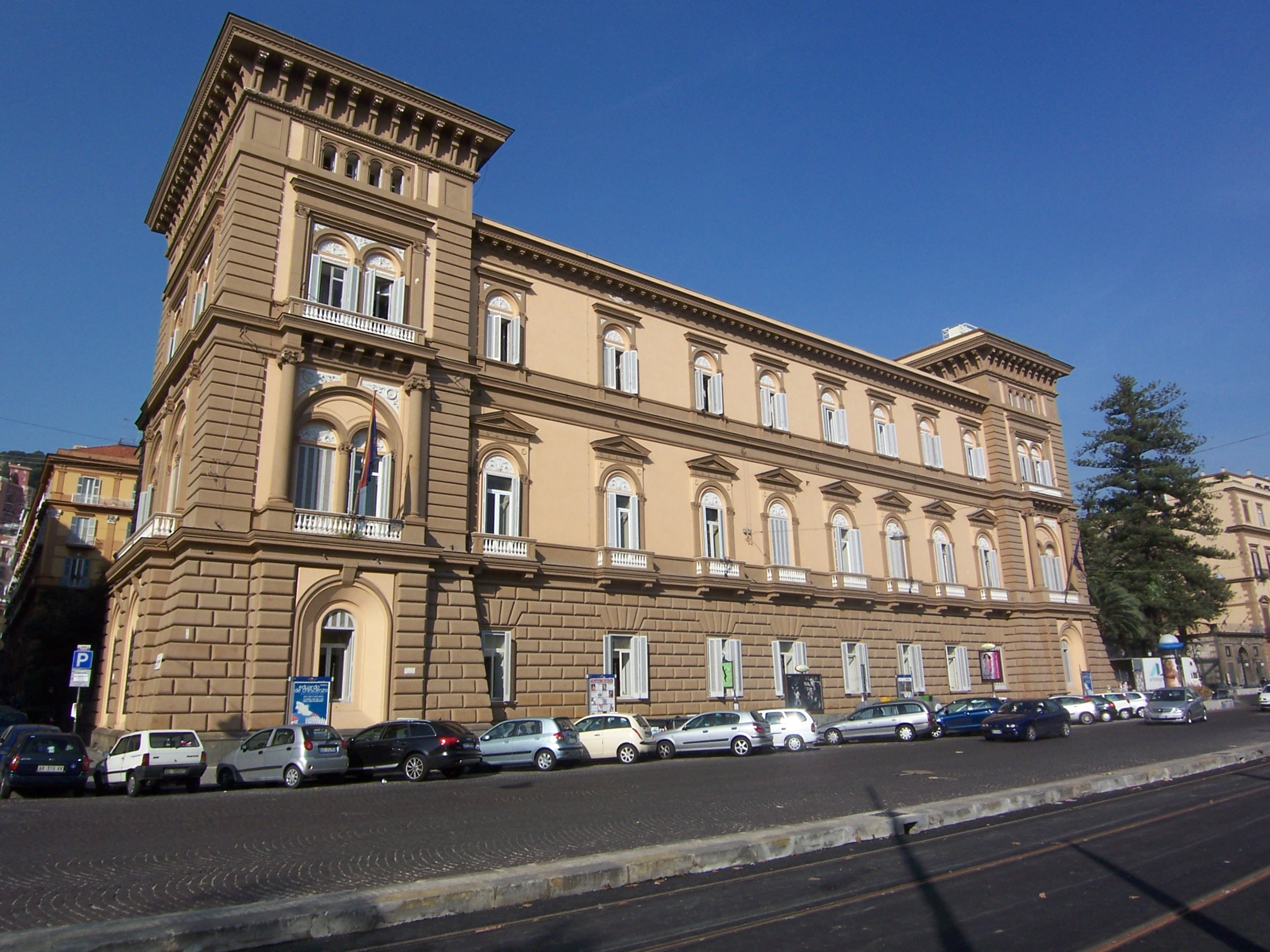
The Palazzo Caravita di Sirignano in Naples, the historic headquarters of Tirrenia

=== 1930s and 1940s ===
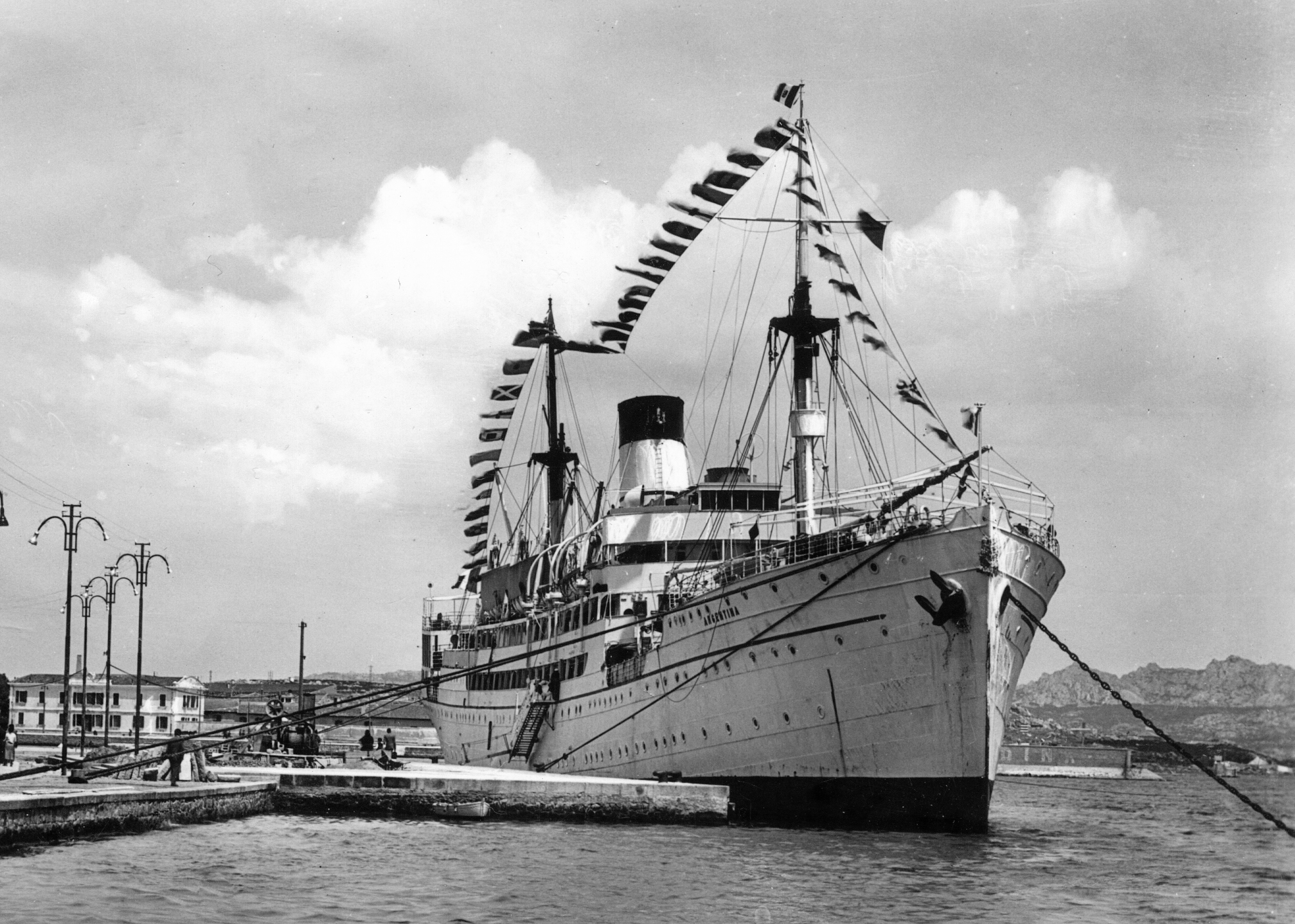
The steamship Argentina at La Maddalena in the 1950s. The Argentina was among the company's few ships not sunk during World War II.

With the Royal Decree-Laws No. 2081 and 2082 of 7 December 1936, the Italian government reorganized the shipping lines, which was defined as being of "preeminent national interest." They were divided into four sectors, each assigned for 20 years from 1 January 1937, to a specially established shipping company. The deadline for the pre-existing conventions was moved to 31 December 1936; the companies that performed the convention services were put into liquidation and their fleets merged with those of the new companies. The resulting arrangement was as follows:

- The freight and passenger lines to the Americas were assigned to the Italia Società Anonima di Navigazione.
- Freight and passenger lines to Africa beyond the Suez Canal and Gibraltar, Asia, and Australia were assigned to the Lloyd Triestino Società Anonima di Navigazione.
- The cargo and passenger lines of the Tyrrhenian Sea, for Libya, the Western Mediterranean, the so-called "Periplo Italico" and Northern Europe were assigned to Tirrenia Società Anonima di Navigazione.
- The Adriatic and Eastern Mediterranean freight and passenger lines were assigned to the Adriatica Società Anonima di Navigazione.

All four companies were to be majority-owned by Finmare, a specially-formed company under the Istituto per la Ricostruzione Industriale (IRI).

Tirrenia Società Anonima di Navigazione was officially incorporated on 17 December 1936, in Naples, with a share capital of 150 million liras (Note: Other sources give 18 or 19 December as the date of the company's incorporation) Alessandro Ciano was appointed president In early 1937 Tirrenia was assigned 53 ships from the fleets of the liquidated Tirrenia Flotte Riunite Florio - CITRA (30 ships), Società Adria di Navigazione (17 ships) and Società Sarda di Navigazione (6 ships); in addition to these, two steamships, Praga and Aventino, were purchased from Lloyd Triestino during 1937. On 15 November 1937, the former Adria unit named Boccaccio sank after an explosion, resulting in one death among the crew; Tirrenia replaced it with the steameship Makala, purchased from Compagnie Africaine de Navigation and renamed Giovanni Boccaccio. In 1938 four of the company's motor ships (Città of Savona, Città of Bastia, Città of Naples, and Olbia) were part of the convoy of 15 ships that transported Italian settlers to Libya.

The list of routes assigned to Tirrenia in 1936 was updated in 1938 and then again by Law No. 1002 on 10 June 1939, by which it was established that subsidies to the company would amount to 86 million liras annually, to be reduced to 83 million from 1 January 1941. In 1939, the Tirrenia, taking advantage of the incentives for new construction granted by the 1938 Benni Law, ordered a series of eleven freight motor boats (the Foscolo Class) to replace the now obsolete steamships inherited from the Adria and in service on the lines to Northern Europe.

Following Italy's entry into World War II in June 1940, the number of routes served was drastically reduced, while the faster and more modern ships were converted into auxiliary cruisers or used to transport troops and cargo. Only the Civitavecchia - Newfoundland (Olbia), Genoa - Livorno - Portoferraio - La Maddalena - Cagliari - Palermo, and Genoa - Livorno - Porto Torres lines remained active initially, in addition to local Sardinian connections. As the war progressed, Tirrenia lost more than 50 ships, almost its entire fleet, and consequently suspended most of its routes; in 1943, before the Armistice of Cassibile, connections to and from Sardinia were effectively discontinued. After 8 September, the motors Città of Alessandria and the Steamship Argentina, the only unharmed units in Tirrenia's hands at that time besides the small steamers Gallura, Capo Sandalo, Gennargentu, and the motor boats Carloforte, were requisitioned by the Allies.

The first resumption of services to Sardinia occurred in December 1944, when a fortnightly connection between Naples and Cagliari was activated with the steamer Abbazia, chartered by Adriatica. In April 1945 the line was extended to Palermo, reactivating the connections with Sicily, thanks to the entry into service of the steamer Campidoglio, also chartered by Adriatica, while in June the Civitavecchia-Olbia connection was reopened with the old freight steamer Langano (built-in 1894 and chartered by Costa); the latter unit was later replaced by the motor ship Patriota (chartered by Italia di Navigazione). In August passenger service was also restored on the latter line using the motors Lazzaro Mocenigo, with accommodations for 260 people. The capacity of the Mocenigo soon proved insufficient and the steamers Abbazia and Campidoglio were used instead, while the Naples-Cagliari-Palermo connection was provided by the steamer Toscana, chartered by Oriens. In April 1945, the management of the company was entrusted to a government commissioner, whose term of office ended, and in January 1946, lawyer Umberto Ricciuti was appointed president.

In the immediate aftermath of the war, Tirrenia continued the activity of restoring the connections interrupted by the conflict. To this end, the units gradually released by the Allies (the motor ships Città of Alessandria, Città of Tunisi, and the steamship Argentina) were put back into service, and the construction of the Giosuè Borsi, which had remained unfinished during the war, was completed. It also became necessary to salvage units sunk during the conflict and return them to seaworthiness: these operations were carried out between 1946 and 1947 for the steamships Ichnusa and Limbara and the motor ships Rossini, Città di Marsala, Alfredo Oriani and Verdi; the latter were renamed Città di Messina, Città di Trapani, Cagliari and Celio, respectively, after repairs. In 1947, under the Ship Sales Act of the United States of America, Tirrenia was able to take advantage of three Liberty-class cargo steamers, renamed Napoli (formerly Otto Mears), Firenze (formerly George T. Angel) and Milano (formerly M. Michael Edelstein), which were destined to transport coal from the United States to Italy; these were joined by another smaller cargo steamer, the Marechiaro (formerly Charles Hull).

In July 1948, the Lazzaro Mocenigo and the Ipparco Baccich, hitherto chartered by the Fiumana Company, were finally purchased, renamed Civitavecchia and Olbia, and employed on the Genoa-Olbia and Genoa-Porto Torres routes; the second line was later reinforced with a second ship, the steamer Torres. The last ship to be salvaged was the Città di Savona, sunk in February 1944 and salvaged by the Greek government, which rejoined the fleet in November 1949 under the name Città di Livorno. Also in 1949, the service of the Periplo Italico was restored, using three chartered ships for the purpose (the steamer Maria Carla and the motor ships Francesca and Anna Maria, the latter purchased and renamed the Città di Siracusa and Città di Catania in 1953).

=== 1950s ===
In 1950, work continued to restore prewar services. The Civitavecchia - Cagliari connection was reopened, initially employing the motorship Celio (formerly Verdi), and the connections with Northern Europe, to which the two steamships Valgardena and Valtellina, chartered by Vivaldi & Giacobini and Ligure-Veneta di Navigazione, were assigned. At the end of the year, the Tirrenia had a fleet of 21 ships, with a total tonnage of 61,038 tons; 2,953 voyages had been made, carrying a total of 604,184 passengers and 242,486 tons of cargo. However, the ships in service were very uneven in age and characteristics, and there was a lack of units with sufficient capacity and speed to satisfactorily perform postal services. Noting the inadequacy of the ships in service in the face of the gradual increase in demand for transportation, five twin motor boats were ordered from the Castellammare di Stabia and Palermo shipyards in April, taking advantage of the benefits granted for new shipbuilding by the so-called "Saragat Law" of 1949. The five ships, capable of carrying 560 passengers each, were christened with the names of the Central-South regions (Sicily, Calabria, Sardinia, Lazio, and Campania Felix) and entered service between 1952 and 1953, being destined for the Naples - Palermo, Naples - Palermo - Tunis, Naples - Cagliari and Civitavecchia - Olbia lines. Also in 1952, the Città di Tunisi, which had undergone extensive refurbishment in the previous year (the main engines and generators were replaced, and the passenger and crew quarters were completely redone), re-entered service on the Naples - Palermo line.

Beginning in 1952, routes to Benghazi via the Città di Trapani were restored, while in January 1953 it was the turn of connections to Spain (Barcelona, Valencia) with the ships Città di Alessandria, Città di Messina and Celio. Beginning in 1953, the only Foscolo-class ships still in service for Tirrenia, Cagliari and Giosuè Borsi, which had been equipped with passenger accommodations in the immediate postwar period, were converted back to cargo ships and placed on the northern European links, for which they had been specially built in the 1940s. They were joined by two chartered motor boats, Vallisarco and Valdarno, which replaced the steamers Valgardena and Valtellina.

Between 1954 and 1955, Liberty-class ships, which had already been chartered to Lloyd Triestino in previous years, were sold to private shipowners. The previous year the Olbia (formerly Lazzaro Mocenigo) had been sold, while from 1955 the Civitavecchia was chartered to other shipowners; their places on the Genoa-Olbia-Porto Torres and Livorno-Bastia-Porto Torres lines were taken by the Città di Livorno and the Città di Alesandria, respectively.

Despite the coming online of the Regione class ships and the consequent reorganization of services, the growing demand for transportation to and from Sardinia made it necessary for other newly built ships to enter service. Thanks to the facilities provided by the "Tambroni Law" of 1954, the following year Tirrenia ordered three ships, two twins to be destined for the Civitavecchia - Olbia line and one, smaller, designed for the Genoa - Porto Torres. The three ships, christened Arborea, Caralis, and Torres, entered service on their respective routes in 1957.

Meanwhile, the 1937 agreement, which was to expire on 31 December 1956, was extended, initially until 30 June 1957, and later until 30 June 1962.

On 4 December 1957, the Città di Trapani, engaged on a link between Genoa, Cagliari, Palermo, and Tunisi that had been opened a few months earlier, ran aground off the port of Trapani. Four Tirrenia seamen and two embarked on the tug Pirano, engaged in the rescue, lost their lives in the accident; the ship, after lengthy salvage attempts, was declared lost in February 1958, making it the only unit lost by the company in the postwar period. To replace the wrecked unit, the motors Filippo Grimani was chartered and then, in January 1958, purchased by Adriatica, renamed the Città di Tripoli, and placed on the Livorno - Olbia - Porto Torres link.The Città di Alessandria was then in turn shifted onto the Libya links, while the steamer Argentina, employed for this purpose up to that time, was decommissioned.

Demand for transport to Sardinia continued to grow, and in March 1959 Tirrenia, again taking advantage of the benefits of the Tambroni Law, ordered a new pair of sister ships, the Città Class. A heavy strike by Finmare seamen occurred between May and June; to prevent Sardinia from becoming isolated, Sicily, Sardinia, and Lazio were requisitioned by the Ministry of Merchant Marine and directly armed with military crews.

=== 1960s ===
The early 1960s saw a continuation of the strengthening of connections with Sardinia, whose tourist development was in its infancy. In 1960 the old steamer Argentina was sold for demolition and the Egyptian turboship Nefertiti was purchased, which was renamed Olbia and destined, starting the following year, to join the Torres on the Genoa-Porto Torres line, the frequency of which was increased to six runs per week. Then in 1962 the two sister ships of the Città class, Città di Napoli and Città di Nuoro, entered service on the Civitavecchia - Olbia.

Also in 1962, the steamship Belluno was purchased by Adriatica, which was assigned to the freight line of the Periplo Italico, with terminus stops in Trieste and Genoa, together with the steamship Marechiaro (initially a sister ship of the Belluno, before the latter was modified) and the motors Città di Catania.

In 1962 the convention with the Italian state was finally renewed, as mentioned expired on 31 December 1956, and extended thereafter for six months and then five years. The new convention, established by Law No. 600 2 June 1962, was ratified only in January 1965; it again lasted for twenty years and confirmed the lines already provided by the previous one, but changed the subsidy system: whereas previously the state had committed itself to replenishing the balance sheet of Tirrenia and the other Finmare companies every year, guaranteeing a profit equal to at least 4 percent of the share capital, from 1962 the subsidy had a fixed amount, which would be reviewed every two years. In January 1963, lawyer Bernardo Giannuzzi Savelli was appointed president of the company, who was succeeded, after his death the following year, by Dr. Salvatore Stara; general manager, since 1956, was Commander Giuseppe Pirandello.

Put into service in the previous decade ten new passenger ships intended for connections with the major islands and North Africa, in 1964 four small ferries were ordered from Navalmeccanica of Naples to operate local Sardinian connections, on which were in service outdated steamers built in the pre-war period (Capo Sandalo, Gallura and Luigi Rizzo). The four ferries (La Maddalena, Teulada, Arbatax, and Bonifacio) entered service in 1966, being placed on the Palau - La Maddalena, La Maddalena - Santa Teresa Gallura - Bonifacio, Carloforte - Calasetta and Carloforte - Portovesme connections.

The rapid process of motorization that took place in Italy caused a rapid growth in demand for vehicle transport by ship, to which Tirrenia initially responded in a very limited way. In the winter of 1963, the Adriatica's ferry Appia was chartered to make trial runs between Genoa and Porto Torres, an operation repeated in later years, while in 1965, conversion work was carried out on the Città di Alessandria, which obtained accessible garages with side doors. Beginning in 1965, the private companies Società Navi Traghetto and Società Traghetti Sardi put into service on the routes to Sicily and Sardinia five modern ro-ro ferries, which from the moment they entered service gained considerable traffic shares at the expense of the Tirrenia; the ships of the private shipowners were joined by the Ferrovie dello Stato ferries in service between Civitavecchia and Golfo Aranci, whose garages could also carry cars and trucks in addition to railroad cars. During the same period, connections to North Africa also saw a decline in the number of passengers carried due to competition from air services.

The state-owned company reacted by commissioning Italcantieri of Trieste to undertake a project to convert the Regione-class units into ro-ro ferries, which was implemented for four of the five ships in the class between 1967 and 1969. The converted units were gradually put into service on the Naples - Palermo - Tunisi, Naples - Cagliari - Civitavecchia, and Naples - Catania - Syracuse - Malta - Tripoli lines, while the other lines remained the preserve of conventional units. This plan also proved insufficient, and in March 1968 six ro-ro passenger ferries, the Poeta Class, of much larger size and capacity than the converted Regione class were ordered from Italcantieri. In September 1969, Commander Emanuele Cossetto was appointed chief executive officer and general manager.

=== 1970s ===
In 1970, Tirrenia ships participated in the repatriation operations of some 20,000 Italians from Libya, following the decree of confiscation of their property issued by Muammar Gaddafi. Stefano Pugliese was appointed president of the company, replaced the following year by lawyer Pasquale Schiano.

The early 1970s saw a profound renewal of the fleet. On 8 July 1970, the Boccaccio, the first ship of the Poeta class, entered service on the Genoa - Porto Torres, followed in the following months by the sister ships Carducci, Pascoli, Leopardi, Petrarch, and Manzoni. The Poeta-class ships enabled Tirrenia to reverse the trend of previous years and regain market share at the expense of competitors, particularly the associated companies Società Navi Traghetto and Società Traghetti Sardi. In addition to the Poeta-class ships, a seventh ro-ro passenger ship, the ferry La Valletta, was acquired, intended for connections with Malta.

The entry into service of these new units and the evolution of maritime traffic led to the decommissioning of several traditional freight and passenger units in 1970-1972. In 1970 the Città di Tunisi and the Città di Livorno were stopped and sold for scrapping, while in March of the following year, the freight line Genoa-East coast of Sardinia-Sicily-Pantelleria was discontinued and the steamers Ichnusa and Campidano in service on it were sold for scrapping. Also in 1971, the motor ships Città di Alessandria and Città di Tripoli, the steamers Marechiaro and Belluno, and the turboship Olbia were decommissioned and sold for scrapping. Also laid up was the Caralis, which was later sold in 1973 In 1972 the connections with France and Spain were merged with the Periplo Italico and the motorships Celio and Città di Messina laid up and scrapped, while the Campania Felix was laid up in September. The following year the freight lines of the Periplo Italico and those to France and Spain were replaced by a new link Trieste - Bari - Catania - Naples - Genoa - Marseille - Barcelona - Algiers, on which the chartered ro-ro freighters Canguro Giallo and Canguro Biondo, renamed Staffetta Adriatica and Staffetta Tirrenica and later purchased, were put into service. The motor ships Città di Catania and Città di Siracusa were then scrapped.

With Law No. 684 20 December 1974, the Italian government reorganized the services carried out by the Finmare companies, proceeding to a divestment from international passenger lines and promoting a more market-appropriate management of the group's companies. The validity of the conventions stipulated in 1962 ceased on 31 December 1974, and the Ministry of the Merchant Navy was given the possibility of stipulating new ones, of annual duration and renewable for a maximum of five years, beginning in January 1975. The same law also provided for a strengthening of connections with the major islands, which were the responsibility of Tirrenia, and this was made concrete in March 1975 with a plan that included the construction of eight passenger ferries and three cargo ships, ordered from Italcantieri on 24 December 1975. To speed up their entry into service, it was decided to have two of the new passenger units built on the same design as the Poeta class, while the other six would be built from scratch. The process of decommissioning the conventional units also continued; the Arborea was stopped in 1974 and, in parallel with the construction of the new units mentioned above, it was planned to stop the motor ships Città di Nuoro, Città di Napoli, and Torres. As of May 1975, the line to Northern Europe was assigned to Adriatica, which chartered the ships employed on it (Cagliari, Giosuè Borsi, and Vallisarco).

In 1975, local services were also reorganized: by Law 169 19 May 1975, it was decided to establish three companies dedicated to them, Toremar, Caremar, and Siremar, based in Livorno, Naples, and Palermo, respectively. As of 1 January 1976, the three companies, in which Tirrenia had a minimum 51 percent share, were assigned, respectively, connections with the islands of the Tuscan archipelago, the Campania archipelago, and the Ponziane islands, and connections with the Aeolian, Aegadian, Pelagian, Ustica, and Pantelleria islands.

Between 1976 and 1978, pending the gradual entry into service of the units ordered from Italcantieri, the ferries Canguro Bianco and Canguro Verde were chartered from Linee Canguro S.p.A, Espresso Venezia and Espresso Ravenna from Adriatica, all destined to reinforce connections with Sardinia, including the new lines Genoa-Olbia-Arbatax and Genoa-Cagliari. The first two ships were returned to the owning company in 1978, while the others continued to be part of the Tirrenia fleet thereafter. During the same period, a renewal of the Sardinian regional fleet was put in place through the purchase of the small ferries Carloforte and Limbara while the ferry La Valletta, deemed unsuitable for connections to Malta, was sold to Siremar and replaced with a German-built unit, the Malta Express.

In 1978 the first two ferries ordered in December 1975 entered service, the Poeta Deledda and Verga class units, which were destined for the Civitavecchia - Olbia link to replace the two Città class ships. In 1979 the Domiziana and Emilia, the first units of the new Strade Romane class, and the three Staffetta class freight units (Staffetta Mediterranea, Staffetta Ligure, and Staffetta Jonica), capable of carrying 117 semi-trailers, entered service. The former was introduced on the Genoa - Porto Torres link, while the three freight units were placed alongside the Staffetta Tirrenica and the Staffetta Adriatica on the lines to North Africa, with terminus in Trieste, Genoa, and Tripoli.

=== 1980s ===
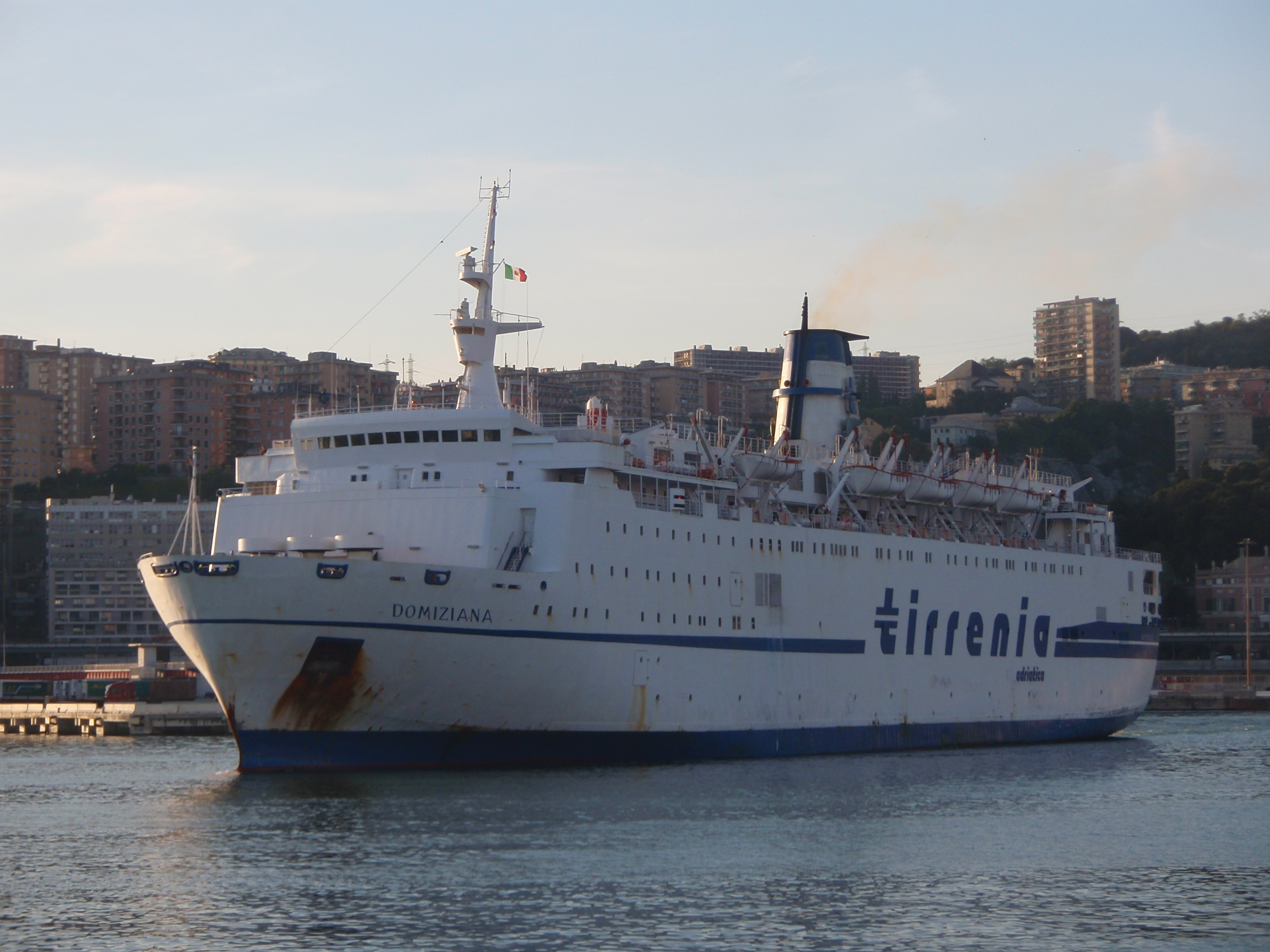
The Domitian in Genoa in 2010

Between 1980 and 1981, with the entry into service of the four remaining units of the Strade Romane class (Aurelia, Clodia, Nomentana, and Flaminia), the fleet renewal plan established in 1975 was completed. The low fares and the increase in Tirrenia's offer led to a substantial withdrawal by private shipowners in the connections to Sardinia, which were considered no longer economically viable. (Note: Private shipowners reduce connections to Sardinia, in Corriere della Sera, 4 December 1980.) The entry into service of these new ferries also led to the gradual decommissioning of the remaining Regione-class ships and traditional passenger ships, which were relegated to the role of reinforcement during the summer months; these ships were also used, between November 1980 and February 1982, as temporary accommodation for those displaced by the 1980 Irpinia earthquake. In 1984, Dr. Franco Pecorini was appointed managing director and general manager.

In the following years, the fleet structure remained stable, with only a few changes: in 1984 the Sardinia was sold for scrap, leaving only two Region-class ships still in service for Tirrenia, while in December 1985 the City-class ships, deployed the year before to open an ephemeral Civitavecchia-Cagliari-Sant'Antioco line, were used to accommodate the people of Naples displaced by the explosion of the Agip depot.

In January and February 1986, two more ferries were taken over for local Sardinian connections, the Isola di Caprera and the Ichnusa. In December of that year, the government issued new regulations for the restructuring of the public fleet, by which the system of subsidizing the lines operated by Tirrenia was again modified, and the establishment of a company dedicated to the performance of local Sardinian services was established. Saremar, founded in April 1987, actually became operational on 1 January 1988, taking charge of the ships dedicated to connections with the minor Sardinian islands.

Then, starting in 1986, a fleet upgrade program was initiated to meet the ever-increasing demand for passenger transport to Sardinia. Between 1986 and 1987, the Strade Romane class units underwent a major refurbishment, which involved the addition of a new 12-meter-long cylindrical body amidships and an additional deck designed to contain passenger accommodations. Then, between 1987 and 1988, the conversion into passenger ferries was carried out of six ro-ro cargo ships, three of the Staffetta Mediterranea class and three acquired in 1987 from Lloyd Triestino (Apulia, Torre del Greco, and Adria). The former, renamed Arborea, Caralis, and Torres went to form the Sociale class, while the others, renamed Capo Spartivento, Capo Sandalo, and Capo Carbonara, formed the Capo class. The Staffetta Adriatica and Staffetta Tirrenica remained used for freight services, which were joined by the Campania (formerly Julia), purchased in December 1986 from Lloyd Triestino, and the three sister units Sardinia, Calabria and Sicily, purchased from the Adriatica.

The entry into service of these new units entailed the alienation of the last two Region-class units and the two City-class units, which were all sold for scrapping in 1988. Finally, the ferry Malta Express was sold to Nav.Ar.Ma.

=== 1990s ===
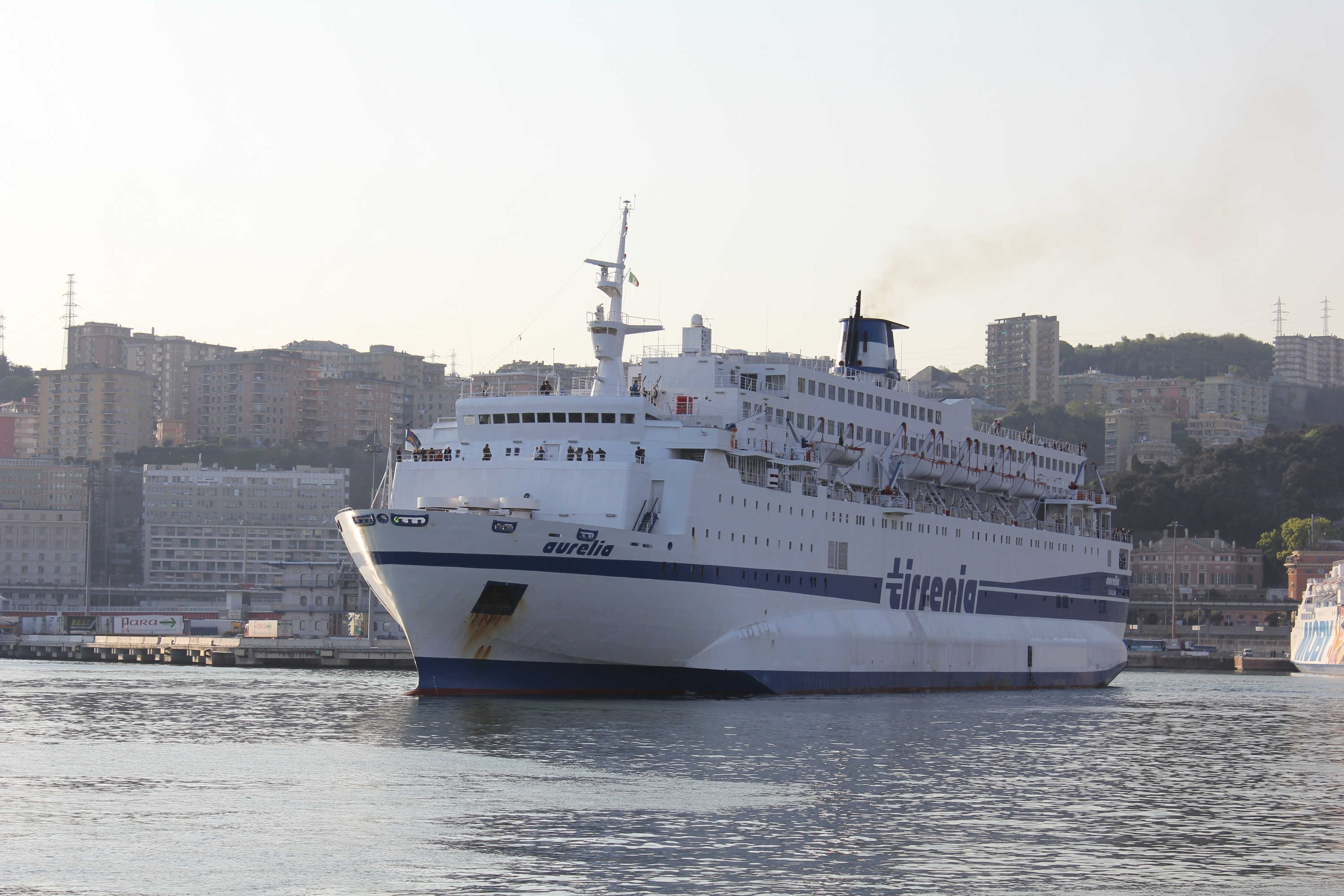
Aurelia in Genoa in 2011, after transformations

Between 1990 and 1992, major conversions were carried out on several of the company's ferries, to increase their passenger capacity In particular, the Leopardi obtained new car decks, while the other Poeta class first series ships (Boccaccio, Carducci, Manzoni, Pascoli, and Petrarch) were raised by three decks and fitted with counter-bridges. Similar operations were carried out on three units of the Strade Romane class (Aurelia, Clodia, and Nomentana), which returned to the shipyard for the addition of two more decks and counter purlines, being named Strade Romane Trasformate. These interventions, while greatly increasing the passenger accommodations of the units involved, resulted in a heavy aesthetic impact on the ships (especially on the Poet class ships) and a reduction in their speed.

The following years were marked by the introduction of a new generation of ferries, designed to drastically reduce the time in passenger connections to Sardinia. In July 1993 the first unit of this type, the Aquastrada-class ferry TMV 101 Guizzo, built at Cantieri Navali Rodriquez in Messina, entered service. The Guizzo had a single hull and could carry 450 passengers and 120 cars, achieving more than twice the speed of the other ferries in the fleet (40 knots) thanks to a propulsion system consisting of a gas turbine and two fast Diesel engines. The Guizzo was put into service on the Civitavecchia - Olbia link, halving the journey time to three and a half hours. The following year, the Guizzo was joined by her twin sister Scatto; the two units were later destined for the new Fiumicino - Golfo Aranci and La Spezia - Golfo Aranci links.

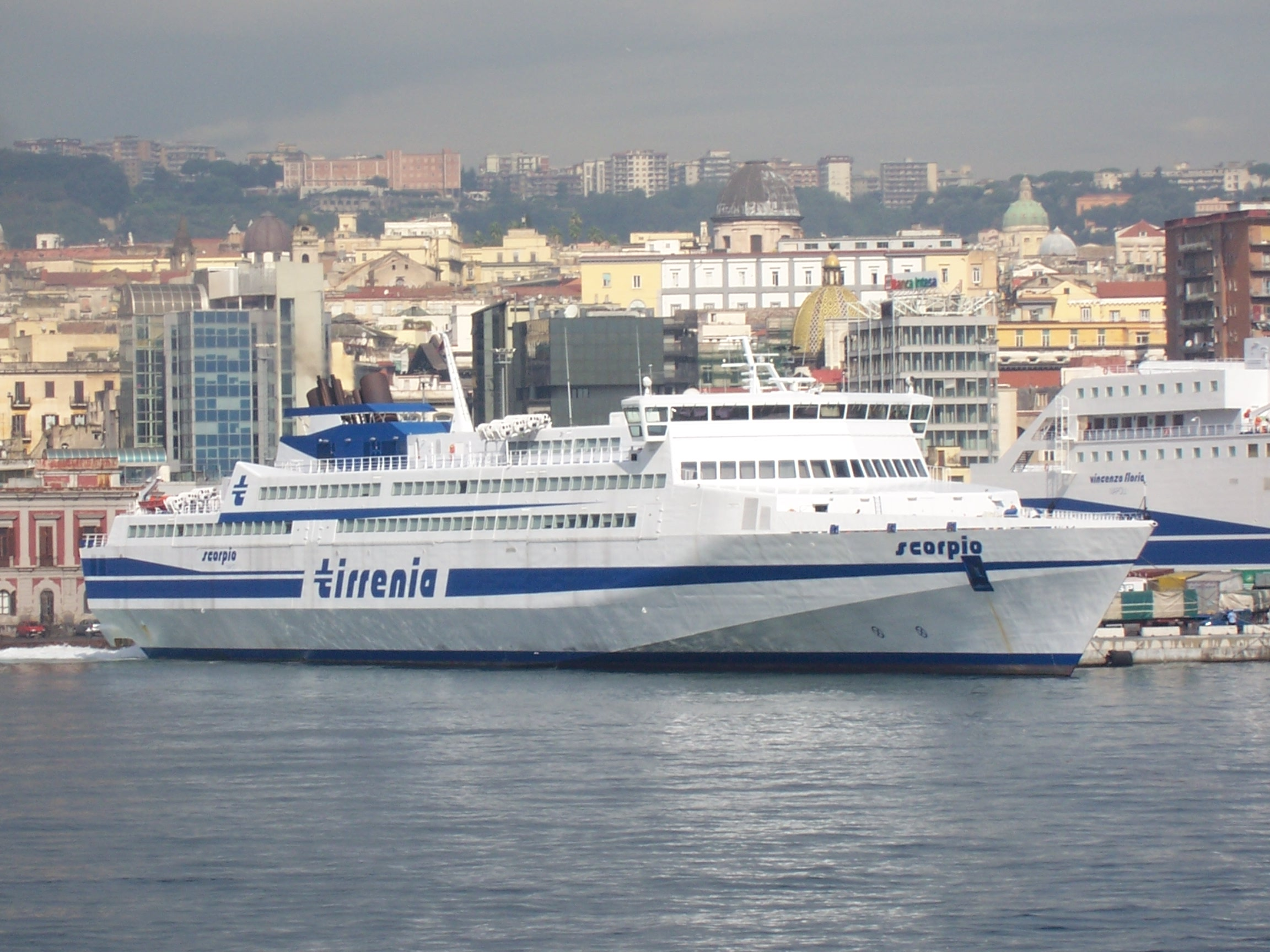
The superfast ferry Scorpio in the port of Naples, 2005

Three ro-ro cargo ferries, Toscana, Lazio, and Puglia, also entered the fleet between 1994 and 1995, the latter two being part of the Viamare class, sister units of those used by the company of the same name. On 14 March 1996, the Caralis ran aground on Serpentara Island while sailing between Cagliari and Civitavecchia; the ship suffered hull damage, but there were no casualties or serious injuries.

The second half of the 1990s saw a profound renewal of Tirrenia's fleet and corporate structure. Two modern ro-ro passenger ferries, Vincenzo Florio and Raffaele Rubattino, were ordered from the Ferrari shipyards in La Spezia, destined for the Naples - Palermo route; it was also decided to continue along the path of superfast ferries, commissioning Fincantieri in Riva Trigoso to build four Jupiter MDV 3000-class single-hull ships, capable of carrying 1,800 passengers and 460 cars at a speed of over 40 knots. The four high-speed ships entered service on routes to Sardinia between 1998 and 1999; the two conventional ferries were instead delivered in 1999 and 2001, with some delays due to the bankruptcy of the shipbuilder. The reorganization of the fleet led to the decommissioning and sale of all the Poeta-class units (Leopardi in 1994, Deledda in 1995, Verga in 1996, and the others in 1999) and the traditional ferries Capo Carbonara and Capo Sandalo.

From a corporate point of view, in September 1998 the Finmare reorganization plan was approved, with the privatization of Lloyd Triestino and Italia di Navigazione and the transfer of Tirrenia to the direct control of IRI. Tirrenia itself assumed the role of the parent company of the state-owned companies engaged in cabotage, taking full control in the early months of the following year. In addition to Tirrenia di Navigazione itself, the group included Adriatica di Navigazione and the regional companies Siremar, Saremar, Toremar, and Caremar, ranking third in Europe in terms of transport figures (13,900,000 passengers and 2,664,000 cars per year) and first in terms of numerical size of the fleet (92 ships). Among the objectives of the business plan approved in March 1999 was also to guide the group to eventual privatization, when the conventions with the state expire on 31 December 2008.

=== 2000s ===
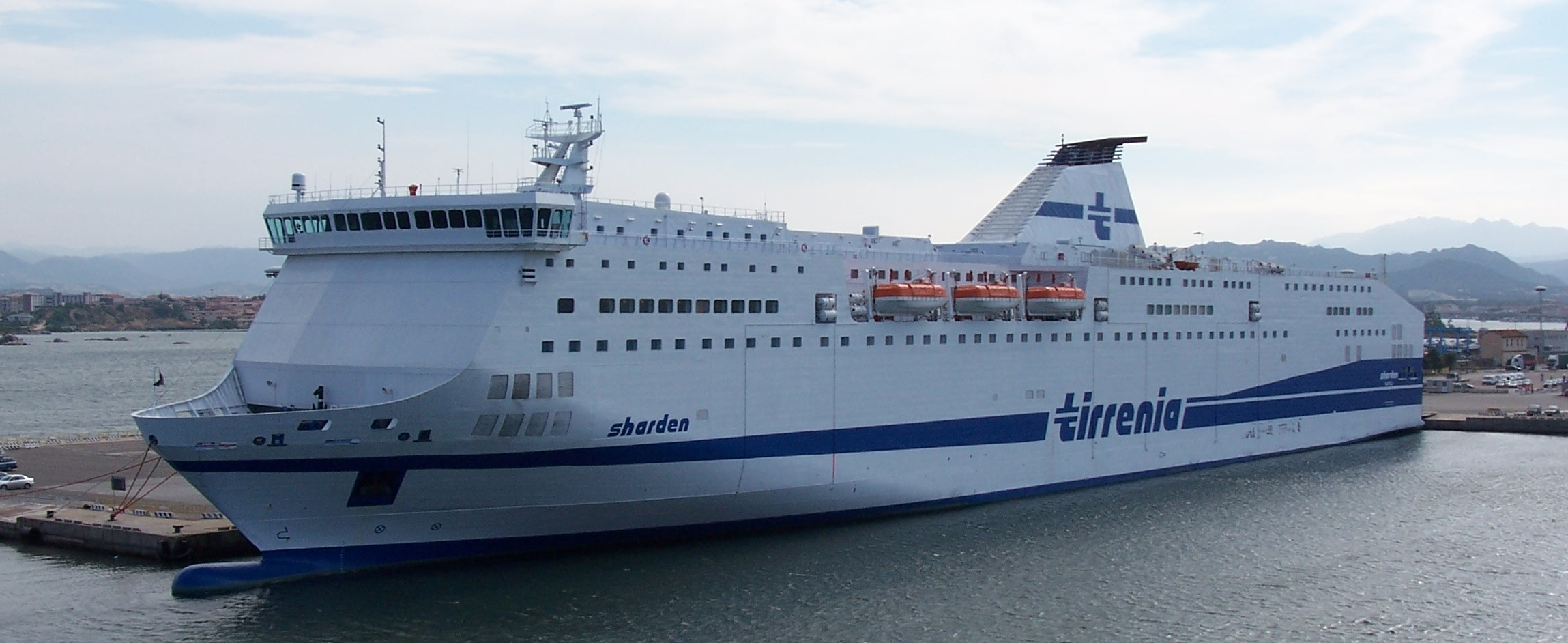
The ferry ship Sharden in the port of Olbia, 2007

The early 2000s were marked by a rationalization of the fleet, consistent with the business plan summarized above. In 2001, the Bithia, a ferry of modern design capable of carrying 2,700 passengers and 900 cars at a service speed of 29 knots, entered service. This was followed in the following years by the Janas, Athara, Nuraghes, and Sharden ferries, the last two characterized by a higher speed and the presence of an additional garage deck. Some ships, such as the Aurelia, Clodia, Nomentana, and Toscana, were not replaced but underwent thorough restyling to bring the interiors up to the standards of the new units. The remaining Sociale and Capo class units were laid up and sold, while the untransformed Strade Romane class units were often chartered to Adriatica, to which the Flaminia and Emilia were permanently sold in 2004.

At the corporate level, in 2002 with the liquidation of IRI Tirrenia came under the control of Fintecna, while in 2004 Adriatica ceased to exist as an independent company and became a division of Tirrenia.

The idea of superfast ferries proved to be a total failure. The units did not find favor with the public because of inconvenient departure and arrival times and poor comfort on board in rough seas, in addition to being penalized by the high consumption of the gas turbines (290 kg of fuel per minute), which made their operation uneconomical. As of 2004, the high-speed units remained mostly laid up at various Italian ports, being sporadically employed during the summer or for charters to other companies.

==== The privatization ====
Although a possible privatization of Tirrenia had been a topic of discussion for years, it was not until 2007 that the first concrete steps in this direction were taken, with the approval by the Interministerial Committee for Economic Planning (CIPE) of the draft of a new convention. The process continued with the following year's finance law, in which the possibility of ceding cabotage services carried out by Tirrenia free of charge to the relevant regional entities that had applied for it was provided for. However, the initiative did not come to fruition, and on 6 November 2008, the Council of Ministers of the Berlusconi IV government gave the go-ahead for the privatization of Tirrenia di Navigazione S.p.A. The agreement with the state was extended until 31 December 2009, so that the privatization process could be completed.

On the night of 29 May 2009, a serious fire broke out on the Vincenzo Florio, sailing between Naples and Palermo; there were no casualties or serious injuries, and the ship was towed to port in Palermo. The ship sustained extensive damage and was placed under impoundment for a long time, only returning to service in 2012 after extensive repair work.

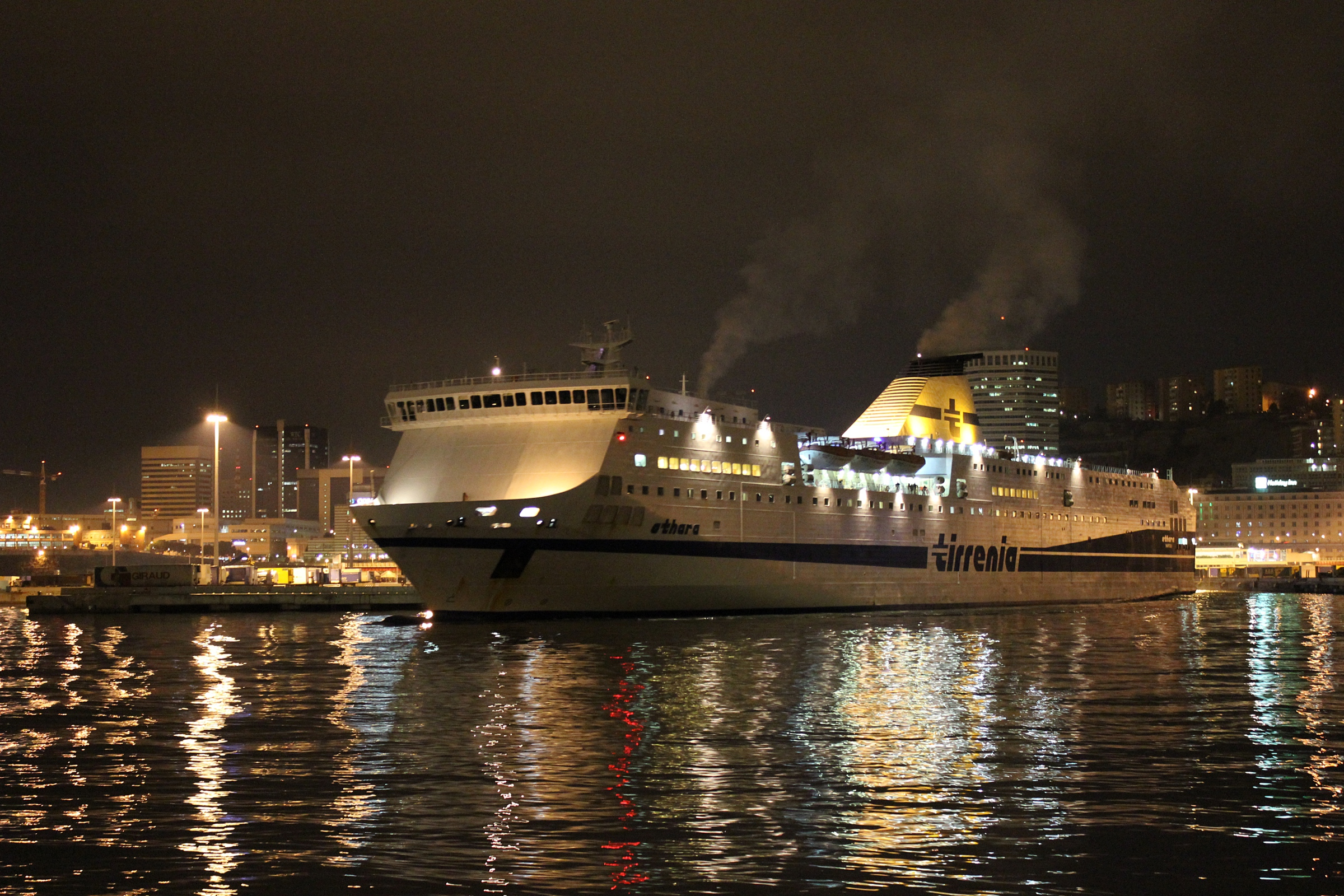
The Athara ferry in the port of Genoa, 2011

The criteria for the privatization of Tirrenia were established by Law No. 166 20 Nov. 2009, in which it was decided, among other things, that the regional companies (Caremar, Saremar, Siremar, and Toremar) would be transferred to their respective regions, which would then be in charge of privatizing them by 30 Sept. 2010. On 23 Dec. 2009, Fintecna opened the call for tenders for the privatization of Tirrenia and Siremar, of which the Sicilian Region had declined to take control. The tender, with a deadline of 19 February 2010, saw the participation of as many as sixteen companies, including SNAV (of shipowner Gianluigi Aponte), Grandi Navi Veloci, Grimaldi Lines, Moby Lines (of shipowner Vincenzo Onorato), Ustica Lines, Corsica Ferries (owned by Corsican shipowner Pascal Lota) and the Mediterranea Holding consortium (in which the Sicilian Region had a 37 percent stake and Greek shipowner Alexis Tomasos' TTT Lines had a 30.5 percent stake). However, the company's significant indebtedness (646 million euros, including 100 million to Fintecna) led to the withdrawal of all bidders except Mediterranea Holding, which then won the tender on 28 July.

The negotiations failed because the winning company did not sign the acquisition contract on time, a delay justified by Mediterranea Holding with the inclusion by Fintecna of a clause providing for the possibility of unilateral revocation of the contract by Fintecna itself. Tirrenia was then placed under receivership on 4 August and on 12 August declared insolvent by the Court of Rome, thus initiating the extraordinary administration procedure provided for in the Marzano Law. The receivership put an end to the leadership of CEO Franco Pecorini, which had lasted since 1984.

A second privatization tender was then called, which closed on 19 May 2011. The only participant, Compagnia Italiana di Navigazione (CIN), a new company formed precisely for the privatization of Tirrenia by Marinvest (Gianluigi Aponte), Moby (Vincenzo Onorato), and Grimaldi, turned out to be the winner. Meanwhile, because no buyer had expressed interest in the Superfast Ferries despite their advanced technology, Tirrenia was forced to sell the units for scrapping at 5 million euros each (as opposed to the 30 million estimated for their actual value). In the summer of 2011, Guizzo, Scatto, Aries, and Taurus were towed to the Aliaga shipyard in Turkey and finally scrapped.

On 21 June 2012, Tirrenia was officially privatized. An EU antitrust decision, which found a dominant position of CIN, led to the exit of the Grimaldi Group, Gianluigi Aponte, and Greek Alexis Tomasos from the company. On 19 July 2012, the closing of the deal could be signed, and CIN officially became the new owner of Tirrenia di Navigazione. The name of the company changed to Tirrenia - Compagnia Italiana di Navigazion, and the new shareholder initiated a corporate restructuring and a slight fleet renewal.

== Passenger accommodations ==
Passenger accommodations on board Tirrenia ships changed over the years, adapting to changing social customs and the functions performed by the ships themselves. Until the 1950s, passenger accommodations were divided into three classes, each with separate common areas; only first-class cabins were equipped with private toilets, while third-class passengers were mostly provided with common dormitories, separate for men and women. Third-class dormitories were abolished only in the 1960s, with the entry into service of the Città di Napoli and the Città di Nuoro, whose passenger spaces were divided into only two classes. The two ships also introduced a new type of accommodation on board, having numerous lounges with aircraft-type reclining seats, which earned them the nickname "Pullman ships." The division into two classes instead of the classic three was later adopted also on Region-class ships when they were converted into ro-ro ferries and gradually on all newly built units. With the development of mass tourism, the differences between first and second class gradually thinned out: by the late 1970s, the Espresso Livorno class ships provided a single class for passenger accommodations, while the Poeta Deledda and Verga class ships, while maintaining first- and second-class cabins, they had public rooms in common.

On board the Tirrenia ships, up to the Vincenzo Florio class, there was then a cell for possible detainees and a cabin designated for escorting carabinieri.

== Liveries ==
Flag of the Tirrenia

At the time of its founding, Tirrenia's ships retained the livery already used since 1932 by Tirrenia - Flotte Riunite Florio-Citra, characterized by a black hull at the bottom and white at the top, white superstructures, and white funnels with two black bands, one at the top and one in between. The company also took from Florio the coat of arms with the rampant lion and the company flag, blue with a diagonal yellow-red stripe. In World War II, ships employed as auxiliary cruisers or for troop and war material transports were repainted with camouflage liveries characterized by light and dark gray striped patterns, which were intended to make it difficult for a submarine observing the ship's course angle to detect it from the periscope.

After World War II, it was decided to visually distinguish between ships intended for passenger service and those dedicated to cargo service: the former had a new livery, characterized by a white hull with a green longitudinal stripe and white superstructures, while the latter had a black painted hull and white superstructures.

The livery was further changed in 1979, when the green longitudinal line became blue and interrupted, on both sides, by the inscription "Tirrenia." The livery on the funnels was also changed, replacing the Florios' black heritage with light blue and inserting the letter "t" on both sides of the funnel within the lower stripe. The last change took place in the late 1990s, notably changing the typeface of the lettering, and the blue stripe became thicker and progressively doubled towards the stern.

The livery of the Ro-Ro freighters consisted of a dark orange hull and white superstructures.

== The fleet ==
This does not include units taken for hire (except those later purchased) and units captured by France and Greece and assigned to Italy during World War II.

=== Units that entered service before and during World War II ===
The following table presents in chronological order the ships that served Tirrenia di Navigazione before and during World War II. Unless otherwise indicated, all data for each ship are taken from the source indicated in the "Name" column. In the case of homonymous ships, they are distinguished by a sequential number in parentheses.

Class	Name	Type	Year of Construction	Gross tonnage (tons)	Passengers	Speed in Knots Years of service for Tirrenia	Note	
-	Gallipoli	Mixed passenger cargo steamship	1898	1,048	400	10	1937 - 1940	Converted into a cargo unit in 1938
-	Montenegro	Mixed steamship	1898	2,626	1,019	10	1937 - 1938	
-	Garibaldi	Passenger steamship	1906	5,298	460	12	1937 - 1944	Salvaged and scrapped in 1949
-	Argentina	Passenger steamship	1907	5,014; 5,387 (Note: After 1938.)	471	12	1937 - 1960	
-	Cagliari	Mixed steamship	1907	2,322	417	10	1937 - 1941	
-	Città di Catania	Passenger Turbine Ship	1910	3,397	1100 (Note: In summer, the maximum number of passengers that could be carried was limited to 599.)	20	1937 - 1943	
-	Bengasi	Passenger steamship	1912	1,716	517	11	1937 - 1941	
Roma	Firenze	Passenger steamship	1912	4,027	1,250	12	1937 - 1940	
Roma	Milan	Passenger steamship	1913	4,028	1,427	12	1937 - 1944	
-	Derna	Mixed steamship	1912	1,769	100	11	1937 - 1943	
Città di Tripoli	Città di Tripoli	Passenger steamship	1915	3,044	1,150	12	1937 - 1941	
Città di Tripoli	Città di Bengasi	Passenger steamship	1917	2,813	926	12	1937 - 1943	Recovered and demolished in 1947
-	Città di Trieste	Passenger steamship	1916	4,658	1081 (Note: Subject to embarkation of 100 tons of additional fixed ballast.)	14	1937 - 1943	
Città di Trapani	Città di Trapani	Mixed motorboats	1929	2,467	113	12,2	1937 - 1942	
Città di Trapani	Città di Spezia	Mixed motorboats	1929	2,473	113	12,2	1937 - 1943	
Città di Trapani	Città di Messina	Mixed motorboats	1929	2,472	113	12,2	1937 - 1941	
Città di Trapani	Città di Marsala	Mixed motorboats	1929	2,480; 2,632 (Note: Since 1947.)	113; 590	12,2	1937 - 1958	Since 1947 Città diTrapani (2)
Città di Trapani	Città di Savona	Mixed motorboats	1929	2,500 2,428 (Note: Since 1950.)	113; 620	12,2	1937 - 1970	Since 1950 Città di Livorno (2)
Città di Trapani	Città di Livorno	Mixed motorboats	1930	2,471	113	12,2	1937 - 1942	
Città di Trapani	Città di Bastia	Mixed motorboats	1930	2,499	113	12,2	1937 - 1941	
Città di Trapani	Città di Agrigento	Mixed motorboats	1930	2,480	113	12,2	1937 - 1942	
Città di Trapani	Città di Alessandria	Mixed motorboats	1930	2,498	113; 340 (Note: Since 1946.)	12,2	1937 - 1971	
Caralis	Caralis (Note: The Caralis differed from its Olbia and Attilio Deffenu twins by having a supercharging system for the two Diesel engines.)	Passenger motorboats	1928	3,509	1,142	14	1937 - 1943	
Caralis	Attilio Deffenu	Passenger motorboats	1929	3,514	1,142	14	1937 - 1941	
Caralis	Olbia	Passenger motorboats	1929	3,510	1,142	14	1937 - 1943	
-	Arborea	Passenger motorboats	1929	4,959	1,534	15,8	1937 - 1944	
Città di Napoli	Città di Napoli	Passenger motorboats	1930	5,418	565	17	1937 - 1942	
Città di Napoli	Città di Palermo	Passenger motorboats	1930	5,413	565	17	1937 - 1942	
Città di Napoli	Città di Genova	Passenger motorboats	1930	5,413	565	17	1937 - 1943	
Città di Napoli	Città di Tunisi	Passenger motorboats	1930	5,418	565; 456	17	1937 - 1971	Refurbished in 1951-52
Baron Beck	Aventino	Mixed steamship	1907	3,781	1,050	11	1937 - 1942	
Baron Beck	Praga	Mixed steamship	1908	3,741	1,050	11	1937 - 1945	
Baron Beck	Celio	Passenger steamship	1908	3,864	1,050	12	1939 - 1940	
-	Ariosto	Freight steamships	1902	4,319	-	10,3	1937 - 1942	
-	Manzoni	Freight steamships	1902	3,955	-	10,2	1937 - 1940	
-	Carducci	Freight steamships	1902	2,028	-	9,5	1937 - 1944	Recovered and demolished in 1947
-	Pascoli	Freight steamships	1902	2,939	-	10	1937 - 1941	
-	Ugo Bassi	Freight steamships	1902	2,900	-	10	1937 - 1941	
-	Tiziano	Freight steamships	1903	1,333	-	10	1937 - 1943	
-	Petrarca	Freight steamships	1910	3,102	-	10,8	1937 - 1943	
-	Leopardi	Freight steamships	1915	3,289	-	9	1937 - 1940	
-	Alfredo Oriani	Freight steamships	1918	3,059	-	10,5	1937 - 1941	
-	Boccaccio	Freight steamships	1919	3,027	-	10	1937	Shipwrecked after explosion on board
-	Foscolo	Freight steamships	1919	3,027	-	10	1937 - 1940	
Musicisti	Puccini	Mixed motorboats	1928	2,422	68	11	1937 - 1942	
Musicisti	Paganini	Mixed motorboats	1928	2,427	68	11	1937 - 1940	
Musicisti	Donizetti	Mixed motorboats	1928	2,428	68	11	1937 - 1943	
Musicisti	Rossini	Mixed motorboats	1928	2,425; 2,380	68	11	1937 - 1972	Since 1947 Città di Messina (2)
Musicisti	Verdi	Mixed motorboats	1928	2,422; 2,384	68	11	1937 - 1972	Dal 1947 Celio (2)
Musicisti	Catalani	Mixed motorboats	1929	2,429	68	11	1937 - 1940	
-	Gennargentu	Passenger steamship	1910	499	320	9	1937 - 1954	
-	Limbara	Passenger steamship	1910	458	350	9	1937 - 1963	
-	Gallura	Passenger steamship	1911	261	200	9	1937 - 1966	
-	Carloforte	Passenger motorboat	1917	79	100	8,5	1937 - 1949	
-	Capo Sandalo	Passenger steamship	1927	137	150	8,5	1937 - 1966	
-	Ichnusa	Passenger steamship	1928	1,242	312	10	1937 - 1971	
-	Giovanni Boccaccio	Freight steamships	1919	3,141	-	10,3	1938 - 1943	
Foscolo	Foscolo (2)	Freight motorboats (Note: The Cagliari (formerly Oriani) and the Joshua Borsi were converted to mixed motor boats between 1948 and 1953.)	1942	4,500	-	14,75	1942 - 1943	
Foscolo	Manzoni (2)	Freight motorboats	1942	4,550	-	14,75	1942 - 1943	
Foscolo	D'Annunzio	Freight motorboats	1942	4,537	-	14,75	1942 - 1943	
Foscolo	Monti	Freight motorboats	1942	1942 - 1943	-	14,75		
Foscolo	Oriani	Freight motorboats	1942	3,129; 4,321 (Note: As a passenger ship between 1948 and 1953.)	-	14,75	1942 - 1977	Sunk in 1944. Recovered in 1947 as Cagliari (2)
Foscolo	Leopardi (2)	Freight motorboats	1943	4,572	-	14,75	1943	Captured by the Germans in 1943
Foscolo	Tommaseo	Freight motorboats	1943	4,573	-	14,75	1943	
Foscolo	Alfieri	Freight motorboats	1943	4,573	-	14,75	1943	
Foscolo	Vittorio Locchi	Freight motorboats	1944	4,753	-	14,75	-	Captured by Germans, then wartime prey of Yugoslavia
Foscolo	Pascoli (2)	Freight motorboats	1944	4,300	-	14,75	-	Requisitioned by the Germans, then wartime prey of France

=== Units that entered service after the war ===
The following table presents in chronological order the ships that served for Tirrenia di Navigazione after World War II. Unless otherwise indicated, all data for each ship are taken from the source indicated in the "Name" column. In the case of homonymous ships, they are distinguished by a sequential number in parentheses.

Class	Name	Type	Year of construction	Gross tonnage (tons)	Passengers	Speed in Knots Years of service for Tirrenia	Note	
-	Civitavecchia	Passenger motorboat	1928	1403	380	13	1945 (Note: August 1945 to July 1948, for hire from the Fiumana Navigation Company.) - 1958	Formerly Lazzaro Mocenigo, Olbia
Liberty (navi trasporto)	Milano (2)	Freight steamship	1944	7,175	-	10,5	1946 - 1954	
Liberty (navi trasporto)	Firenze (2)	Freight steamship	1944	7,185	-	10,5	1946 - 1955	
Liberty (navi trasporto)	Posillipo	Freight steamship	1943	7,170	-	10,5	1947 - 1954	Until 1948, Napoli
Foscolo	Giosuè Borsi	Freight motorboat (Note: Converted to a mixed motorboat between 1948 and 1953.)	1947	3,128; 4,324	-	14,75	1947 - 1977	
-	Olbia (2)	Passenger motorboat	1930	842,88	280	11,5	1946 - 1953	Già Lorenzo Marcello, Civitavecchia
-	Torres	Mixed steamship	1935	1,407	48	10	1948 - 1972	Since 1957, Campidano
N3-S-A2	Marechiaro	Mixed freight-passenger steamship	1944	1,882	100	10	1948 - 1971	
N3-S-A2	Belluno	Freight steamship	1945	2,062	-	10	1962 - 1971	
-	Città di Siracusa	Mixed freight-passenger motorship	1946	1,847	100	11	1949 (Note: Chartered under the name Francesca by COMEDA until 1953.) - 1973	Formerly Francesca; Passenger accommodations added in 1954
-	Città di Catania (2)	Freight motorboat	1949	1,598	-	11	1950 (Note: Chartered under the name Anna Maria by COMEDA until 1953.) - 1973	Formerly Anna Maria
Regione	Sicilia	Passenger motorboats Ro-Ro passenger ferries (after conversion)	1952	5,230; 4,888	560 (1000)	16,75	1952 - 1988	Converted in 1968
Regione	Calabria	Passenger motorboats Ro-Ro passenger ferries (after conversion)	1952	5,231; 4,823	560 (1000)	16,75	1952 - 1988	Converted in 1967
Regione	Lazio	Passenger motorboats Ro-Ro passenger ferries (after conversion)	1953	5,230; 4,882	560 (1000)	16,75	1953 - 1978	Converted in 1967
Regione	Sardegna	Passenger motorboats Ro-Ro passenger ferries (after conversion)	1952	5,208; 4,914	560 (1000)	16,75	1952 - 1984	Converted in 1969
Regione	Campania Felix	Passenger motorboat	1953	5,208	560	16,75	1953 - 1975	
-	Torres (2)	Passenger motorboat	1957	4,208	800	18,5	1957 - 1979	
-	Arborea (2)	Passenger motorboat	1957	5,484	1,200	18	1957 - 1976	
-	Caralis (2)	Passenger motorboat	1957	5,484	1,200	18	1957 - 1973	
-	Città di Tripoli (2)	Passenger motorboat	1928	3,478	350	14,5	1957 - 1970	Formerly Filippo Grimani
-	Olbia (3)	Passenger Turbine Ship	1947	3,975	326	18,5	1960 - 1971	
Città (1962)	Città di Napoli (2)	Passenger motorboats	1962	5,735	1,200	19,5	1962 - 1988	
Città (1962)	Città di Nuoro	Passenger motorboats	1962	5,735	1,200	19,5	1962 - 1988	
-	Luigi Rizzo	Passenger steamship	1929	382	128	12	1963 - 1966	
-	Bonifacio	Ro-Ro passenger ferries	1966	631,58	398	14	1966 - 1986	
La Maddalena	La Maddalena	Ro-Ro passenger ferries	1966	494,41	350	14	1966 - 1988	
La Maddalena	Arbatax	Ro-Ro passenger ferries	1966	494,41	350	14	1966 - 1988	
La Maddalena	Teulada	Ro-Ro passenger ferries	1966	494,41	350	14	1966 - 1988	
Poeta	Boccaccio (2)	Ro-Ro passenger ferries	1970	7,086; 11,799	1200; 1300	20; 19	1970 - 1999	Transformed in 1992
Poeta	Carducci (2)	Ro-Ro passenger ferries	1970	7,086; 11,799	1200; 1300	20; 19	1970 - 1999	Transformed in 1991
Poeta	Manzoni (3)	Ro-Ro passenger ferries	1971	7,086; 11,799	1200; 1300	20; 19	1971 - 1999	Transformed in 1991
Poeta	Pascoli (3)	Ro-Ro passenger ferries	1971	7,086; 11,799	1200; 1300	20; 19	1971 - 1999	Transformed in 1991
Poeta	Petrarca (2)	Ro-Ro passenger ferries	1971	7,086; 11,799	1200; 1300	20; 19	1971 - 1999	Transformed in 1991
Poeta	Leopardi (3)	Ro-Ro passenger ferries	1971	7,086	1200	20	1971 - 1994	
-	La Valletta	Ro-Ro passenger ferries	1971	2,147	496	16,5	1971 - 1976	
Canguro Biondo	Staffetta Adriatica	Ro-Ro passenger ferries	1970	4,736	36	18,8	1973 (Note: Staffetta Adriatica was chartered to Tirrenia from 1973 to 1974.): 1993	
Canguro Biondo	Staffetta Tirrenica	Ro-Ro passenger ferries	1971	4,736	36	18,8	1973 (Note: Staffetta Tirrenica was chartered to Tirrenia from 1973 till 1974.) - 1992	
-	Malta Express	Ro-Ro passenger ferries	1968	4,614	1200	18,5	1976 - 1988	
-	Carloforte (2)	Ro-Ro passenger ferries	1973	492	400	12	1976 - 1988	
-	Limbara (2)	Ro-Ro passenger ferries	1966	492	400	12	1977 - 1988	
Espresso Livorno	Espresso Venezia	Ro-Ro passenger ferries	1977	4,810	799	19,5	1977 (Note: On charter from Adriatica di Navigazione until 1986.) - 1994	Since 1990 Espresso Malta
Espresso Livorno	Espresso Ravenna	Ro-Ro passenger ferries	1978	4,810	799	19,5	1978: 1989	
Poet second series (Note: Verga and Deledda, built eight years after the first ships in the series, had some different characteristics.)	Deledda	Ro-Ro passenger ferries	1978	7,222	1200	21	1978 - 1994	
Poet second series	Verga	Ro-Ro passenger ferries	1978	7,222	1200	21	1978 - 1997	
Strade Romane	Domiziana	Ro-Ro passenger ferries	1979	9,485; 12,523	1373; 2000	21; 19,5	1979 - 2011	Elongated in 1987
Strade Romane	Emilia	Ro-Ro passenger ferries	1979	9,485; 12,523	1373; 2000	21; 19,5	1979 - 2006	Elongated in 1986-87
Strade Romane	Flaminia	Ro-Ro passenger ferries	1981	9,485; 12,523	1373; 2000	21; 19,5	1981 - 2012	Elongated in 1986-87
Strade Romane	Clodia	Ro-Ro passenger ferries	1980	9,485; 12,523; 14,834	1373; 2000; 2,280	21; 19,5; 19	1980 - 2012	Elongated in 1987; Elevated in the 1992
Strade Romane	Nomentana	Ro-Ro passenger ferries	1980	9,485; 12,523; 14,834	1373; 2000; 2,280	21; 19,5; 19	1980 - 2012	Elongated in 1986-87; Elevated in the 1993
Strade Romane	Aurelia	Ro-Ro passenger ferries	1980	9,485; 12,523; 14,834	1373; 2000; 2,280	21; 19,5; 19	1980 - 2012	Elongated in 1987; Elevated in the 1993
Staffetta Mediterranea (Note: The "Staffetta" Class ships, originally used for cargo transport, were converted between 1987 and 1988 into "Sociale" Class passenger ferries.)	Staffetta Mediterranea	Ro-Ro passenger ferries	1979	7,010	34	22	1979 - 1987	Converted to passenger ferry in 1987-88
Staffetta Mediterranea	Staffetta Ligure	Ro-Ro passenger ferries	1979	6,914	34	22	1979 - 1987	Converted to a passenger ferry in 1987-88
Staffetta Mediterranea	Staffetta Ionica	Ro-Ro passenger ferries	1980	6,914	34	22	1980 - 1987	Converted to passenger ferry in 1987
-	Isola di Caprera	Ro-Ro passenger ferries	1986	1,342	600	12	1986 - 1988	
-	Ichnusa (2)	Ro-Ro passenger ferries	1986	2,181	720	14	1986 - 1988	
Classe Sociale (traghetti)	Arborea (3)	Ro-Ro passenger ferries	1980	11,324	1,314	19,5	1987 - 2004	Formerly Staffetta Ionica
Classe Sociale (traghetti)	Caralis (3)	Ro-Ro passenger ferries	1979	11,324	1,314	19,5	1988 - 2000	Formerly Staffetta Ligure
Classe Sociale (traghetti)	Torres (3)	Ro-Ro passenger ferries	1979	11,324	1,314	19,5	1988 - 2004	Formerly Staffetta Mediterranea
Capo (Note: Derived from the conversion of three ro-ro cargo units purchased in December 1986 from Lloyd Triestino.)	Capo Spartivento	Ro-Ro passenger ferries	1981	17,691	1,418	18,5	1988 - 2001	Formerly Apulia
Capo	Capo Sandalo (2)	Ro-Ro passenger ferries	1982	17,691	1,418	18,5	1988 - 2000	Formerly Torre del Greco
Capo	Capo Carbonara	Ro-Ro passenger ferries	1981	17,691	1,418	18,5	1988 - 2004	Formerly Adria
-	Campania	Ro-Ro passenger ferries	1981	6,225	22	19,8	1986 - 2001	Formerly Julia
Tomakomai Maru	Sardegna (2)	Ro-Ro passenger ferries	1976	6,779	16	19,5	1988 - 2006	
Tomakomai Maru	Calabria (2)	Ro-Ro passenger ferries	1976	6,779	16	19,5	1988 - 2006	
Tomakomai Maru	Sicilia (2)	Ro-Ro passenger ferries	1976	6,779	16	19,5	1988 - 2006	
Aquastrada TMV 101	Guizzo	Fast Ferries	1993	3,503	448	40	1993 - 2011	
Aquastrada TMV 101	Scatto	Fast Ferries	1994	3,516	502	39	1994 - 2011	
-	Toscana	Ro-Ro Freight Ferry; Ro-Ro passenger ferry	1994	13,885	80	19	1994 - 2012	Converted in 1997
Viamare	Lazio (2)	Ro-Ro Freight Ferry	1994	14,398	52	19	1994 - 2012	
Viamare	Puglia	Ro-Ro Freight Ferry	1995	14,398	52	19	1995 - 2012	
Viamare	Via Adriatico	Ro-Ro Freight Ferry	1992	14,398	52	19	2004 (Note: Since 2004 to 2006, at Tirrenia Adriatic Division.): 2012	
Viamare	Via Tirreno	Ro-Ro Freight Ferry	1993	14,398	52	19	2004 - 2006	
Viamare	Espresso Catania	Ro-Ro Freight Ferry	1993	14,398	52	19	2004- 2012	
Viamare	Espresso Ravenna (2)	Ro-Ro Freight Ferry	1993	14,398	52	19	2004 - 2012	
Jupiter MDV 3000	Aries	Fast Ferries	1998	11,347	1800	40	1998 - 2011	
Jupiter MDV 3000	Taurus	Fast Ferries	1998	11,347	1800	40	1998 - 2011	
Jupiter MDV 3000	Scorpio	Fast Ferries	1999	11,347	1800	40	1999 - 2011	
Jupiter MDV 3000	Capricorn	Fast Ferries	1999	11,347	1800	40	2011	
Vincenzo Florio	Vincenzo Florio	Ro-Ro passenger ferries	1999	30,650	1471	23	1999 - 2012	
Vincenzo Florio	Raffaele Rubattino	Ro-Ro passenger ferries	1999	30,650	1471	23	1999 - 2012	
Aquastrada TMV 70	Isola di Capraia	Fast Ferry	1999	1,925	522	30	2004 - 2012	
Bithia	Bithia	Ro-Ro passenger ferries	2001	35,736	2700	29	2001 - 2012	
Bithia	Janas	Ro-Ro passenger ferries	2002	35,736	2700	29	2002 - 2012	
Bithia	Athara	Ro-Ro passenger ferries	2003	35,736	2700	29	2003 - 2012	
Nuraghes	Nuraghes	Ro-Ro passenger ferries	2004	39,798	2700	29	2004 - 2012	
Nuraghes	Sharden	Ro-Ro passenger ferries	2005	39,798	2700	29	2005 - 2012	

== Routes taken ==
=== At the foundation (1937) ===
The following are the routes assigned to the newly formed Tirrenia under the 1937 agreement:

Line	Frequency	Ships
Line 1: Naples ↔ Palermo	daily	Città di Naples, Città di Tunisi, Città di Palermo, Città di Genoa
Line 2: Palermo ↔ Tunis	weekly	Città di Naples, Città di Tunisi, Città di Palermo, Città di Genoa
Line 3: Civitavecchia ↔ Terranova (Olbia)	daily	Attilio Deffenu, Caralis, Olbia
Line 5: Naples ↔ Cagliari	weekly	Città di Tripoli, Milano
Line 6: Genoa ↔ Palermo, with stops at La Spezia, Livorno, Portoferraio, La Maddalena, ports of the eastern Sardinian coast and Cagliari	biweekly	Città di Trapani Class
Line 7: Genoa ↔ Palermo, with stops at La Spezia, Livorno, Portoferraio, La Maddalena, ports of the western Sardinian coast and Cagliari	biweekly	Città di Trapani Class
Line 8: Genoa ↔ Porto Torres, with stops at Livorno and Bastia	weekly	Città di Trapani Class
Line 9: Terranova (Olbia) ↔ Porto Torres, with a stop at Golfo Aranci	daily	Limbara
Line 10: Genoa - La Maddalena - Alghero - Cagliari - Tortolì - La Maddalena - Genoa	biweekly	Ichnusa
Line 11: La Maddalena ↔ Bonifacio, with a stop at Palau	daily	Gallura
Line 12: Carloforte ↔ Calasetta	twice daily	Capo Sandalo
Line 13: Carloforte ↔ Portovesme	twice daily	Carloforte
Line 15: Genoa ↔ Tunis, with stops at Livorno, Civitavecchia, Cagliari, and Trapani	weekly	Argentina, Arborea, Garibaldi, Praga, Aventino
Line 16: Palermo ↔ Tunis, with stops at Trapani and Pantelleria	biweekly	Città di Trapani Class
Line 21: Naples ↔ Tripoli, with stops at Catania, Syracuse, and Malta	biweekly	Argentina, Arborea, Garibaldi
Line 22: Naples ↔ Tripoli, with stops at Messina, Syracuse, and Malta	biweekly	Città di Trieste
Line 23: Syracuse ↔ Tripoli	weekly	Argentina, Arborea, Città di Trieste, Garibaldi
Line 24: Naples ↔ Derna, with stops at Syracuse and Benghazi	biweekly	Città di Tripoli, Milano
Line 25: Syracuse ↔ Benghazi	weekly	Città di Tripoli, Milano, Praga, Aventino
Line 26: Tunis ↔ Tripoli, with a stop at Malta	weekly	Praga, Aventino, Argentina, Arborea, Garibaldi
Line 27: Tunis ↔ Tripoli, with a stop at Sfax	biweekly	Città di Trapani Class
Line 28: Tripoli ↔ Alexandria, Egypt, with stops at Benghazi and Tobruk	biweekly	Città di Trapani Class
Line 29: Palermo ↔ Tripoli	weekly	Città di Napoli, Città di Tunisi, Città di Palermo, Città di Genova
Line 32: Fiume ↔ Valencia, with stops at Venice, Ancona, Bari, Catania, Malta, Messina, Palermo, Naples, Livorno, Genoa, Imperia, Marseille, Barcelona, and Tarragona	weekly	Catalani, Donizetti, Paganini, Puccini, Rossini, Verdi
Line 33: Fiume ↔ Genoa, with 21 stops	-	Tiziano
Line 34: Fiume ↔ La Spezia, with stops at Trieste, Venice, Gallipoli, Taranto, Trebisacce, Soverato, Reggio Calabria, Gioia Tauro, Porto Santa Venere, Castellammare del Golfo, Marsala, Livorno, Imperia, and Genoa	-	Cagliari
Line 36: Fiume ↔ Rotterdam, with stops at Trieste, Bari, Catania, Messina, Palermo, London, Hamburg, and Antwerp	bimonthly	Alfredo Oriani, Carducci, Foscolo, Giovanni Boccaccio, Leopardi, Pascoli, Manzoni, Ugo Bassi, Petrarca, Ariosto
Line 37: Genoa ↔ Rotterdam, with stops at Savona, Livorno, Naples, Messina, Catania, Palermo, London, Hamburg, and Antwerp	bimonthly	Alfredo Oriani, Carducci, Foscolo, Giovanni Boccaccio, Leopardi, Pascoli, Manzoni, Ugo Bassi, Petrarca, Ariosto
Line 38: Genoa ↔ Seville, with stops at Palma, Ceuta, Tangier, and Cádiz	every 20 days	Firenze

In addition to the lines shown in the table, the following tourist routes were then planned:

- Itinerary A (Periplo Italico) (Note: Not to be confused with the freight line of the same name.)
- Itinerary B (The Sun Cruise)
- Itinerary C (Toward the South)
- Itinerary D (Along the Palm Coast)
- Itinerary E (The Cruise of the Three Seas)
- Itinerary F (The Cruise of Libya)
- Itinerary G (The Egypt Cruise)

=== In the postwar period (1950) ===
In 1950, having completed an initial phase of fleet reconstruction after the devastation of World War II, the situation of the routes served by Tirrenia was as follows:

Line	Ships
Naples ↔ Tunis, with a stop in Palermo (postal)	Città di Tunisi, Giosuè Borsi, Cagliari (2)
Naples ↔ Cagliari (postal)	Città di Messina (2), Cagliari (2)
Civitavecchia ↔ Olbia (postal)	Città di Alessandria, Città di Trapani (2), Celio, Città di Messina (2)
Naples ↔ Tripoli, with stops in Catania, Syracuse, and Malta (postal)	Argentina, Città di Livorno (2)
Genoa ↔ Porto Torres, with a stop in Bastia (postal)	Olbia, Civitavecchia, Torres
Genoa ↔ Olbia, Livorno ↔ Porto Torres with a stop in Olbia (postal)	Olbia (2)
Carloforte ↔ Calasetta, Carloforte ↔ Portovesme	Capo Sandalo
La Maddalena ↔ Bonifacio, with stops in Palau and Santa Teresa di Gallura	Gallura
Genoa ↔ Tunis, with stops in Sardinia and Sicily (commercial)	Ichnusa
Italian coastal route (commercial)	Annamaria, Francesca, Marechiaro, Maria Carla
Northern Europe (commercial)	Vallisarco, Valdarno, Valgardena, Valtellina

=== In 1966 ===
In 1966, before the introduction of the first ro-ro ferries, Tirrenia operated service on the following routes:

Line	Ships
Civitavecchia ↔ Olbia	Città di Napoli (2), Città di Nuoro
Postal lines: Naples ↔ Tunis with a stop in Palermo; Naples ↔ Cagliari; Civitavecchia ↔ Cagliari; Genoa ↔ Porto Torres; Palermo ↔ Cagliari	Arborea (2), Caralis (2), Sicilia, Sardegna, Lazio, Calabria, Campania Felix
Naples ↔ Tripoli, with stops in Catania, Syracuse, and Malta	Città di Tunisi
Naples ↔ Benghazi, with stops in Catania, Syracuse, and Malta	Città di Livorno (2)
Syracuse ↔ Malta	Città di Alessandria
Livorno ↔ Bastia, with a stop in Portoferraio; Livorno ↔ Porto Torres, with a stop in Bastia	Città di Tripoli (2)
Naples ↔ Cagliari, with a stop in Palermo	Olbia (3)
Genoa ↔ Porto Torres	Torres (2)
Adriatic / Tyrrhenian ↔ Spain	Celio, Città di Messina (2)
Genoa ↔ Palermo with stops at Eastern Sardinian ports and Tunis	Ichnusa, Campidano
Italian coastal route (cargo)	Città di Catania (2), Città di Siracusa, Marechiaro, Belluno
Adriatic ↔ Northern Europe (cargo)	Giosuè Borsi, Cagliari (2)
Tyrrhenian ↔ Northern Europe (cargo)	Valdarno, Vallisarco (chartered)
Palau ↔ Bonifacio, with stops in La Maddalena and Santa Teresa di Gallura	Luigi Rizzo (chartered)
Carloforte ↔ Calasetta	Gallura
Carloforte ↔ Portovesme	Capo Sandalo

=== At the time of privatization (2011) ===
Below are the routes operated by Tirrenia di Navigazione in 2011, a year before privatization.

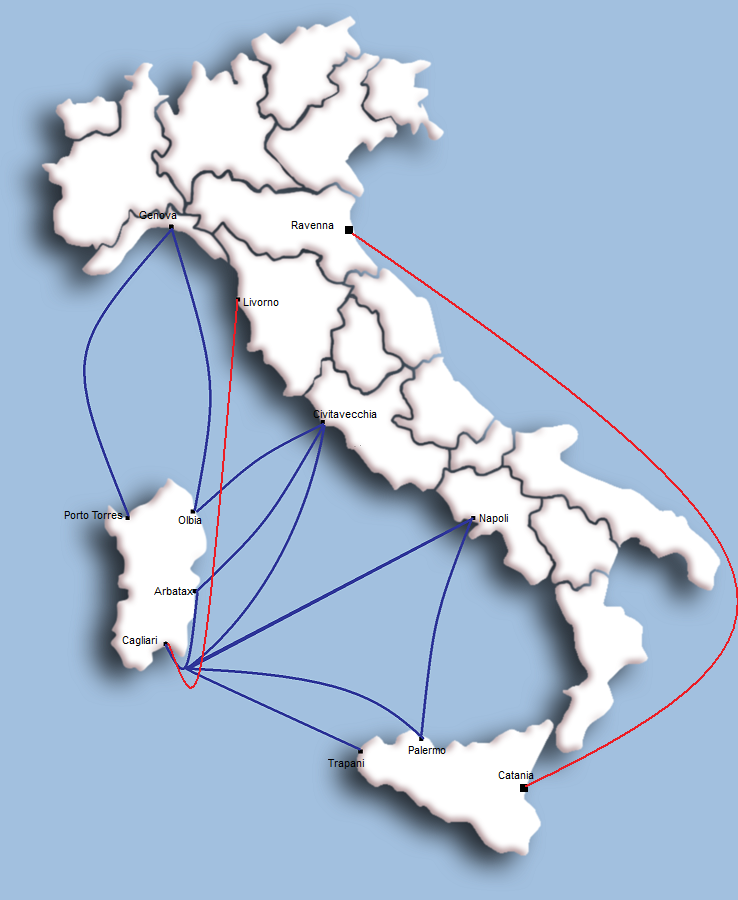
Rotte Tirrenia

==== Sardegna ====
Route	Frequency	Ship	Notes
Genoa ↔ Porto Torres	Daily	Bithia Class	
Civitavecchia ↔ Olbia	Daily	Nuraghes/Sharden Class	
Genoa ↔ Olbia / Arbatax	Multiple times per week	Bithia Class / Strade Romane Class	
Civitavecchia ↔ Arbatax	Twice a week	Strade Romane Class	
Civitavecchia ↔ Cagliari	Five times a week (direct); Twice a week (via Arbatax)	Strade Romane Class	
Livorno ↔ Cagliari	Multiple times per week	Viamare Class	Cargo line
Naples ↔ Cagliari	Twice a week	Toscana / Viamare Class	

==== Sicilia ====
Route	Frequency	Ship	Notes
Naples ↔ Palermo	Daily	Florio/Rubattino	
Cagliari ↔ Palermo	Weekly	Toscana / Viamare Class	
Cagliari ↔ Trapani	Weekly	Toscana / Viamare Class	
Ravenna ↔ Catania	Multiple times per week	Viamare Class	Cargo line

==== Tunisia ====
Connection made by the Compagnie Tunisienne de Navigation.

Route	Frequency	Ships	Notes
Genoa ↔ Tunis	Multiple times per week	Carthage, Tanit	Connection with CoTuNav ships

== Gallery ==
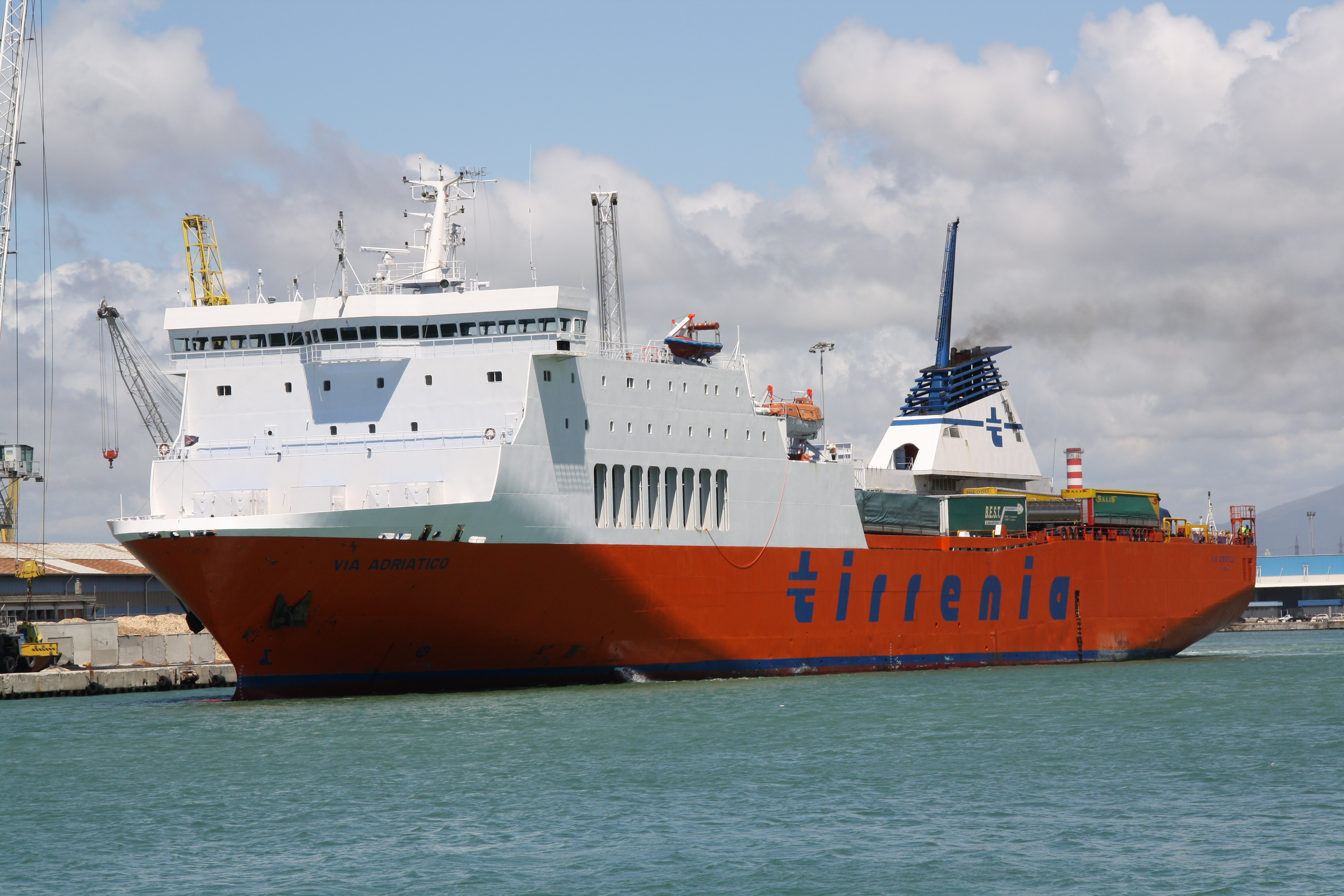
Ro-Ro Beniamino Carnevale.

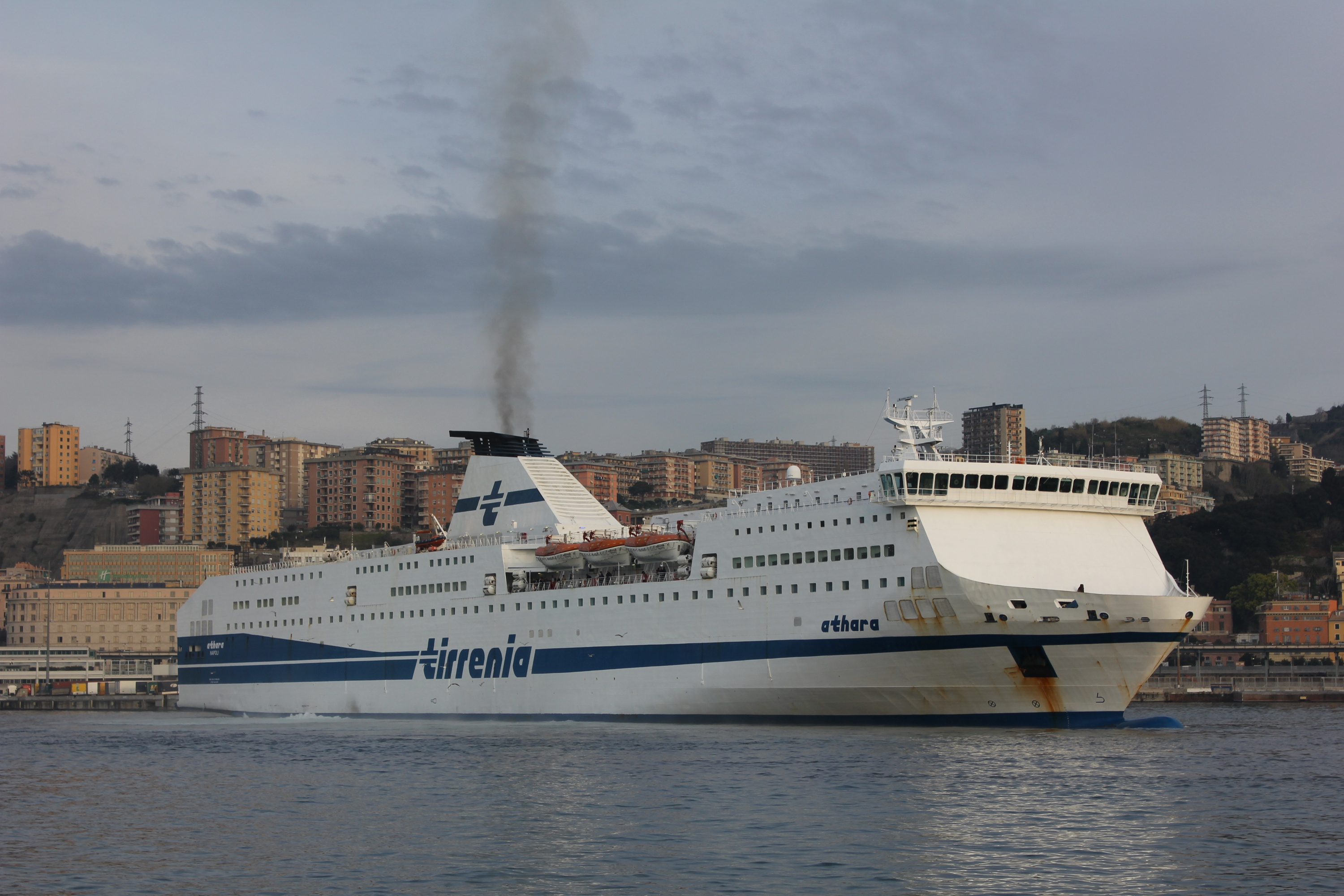
M/S Athara to Genoa.

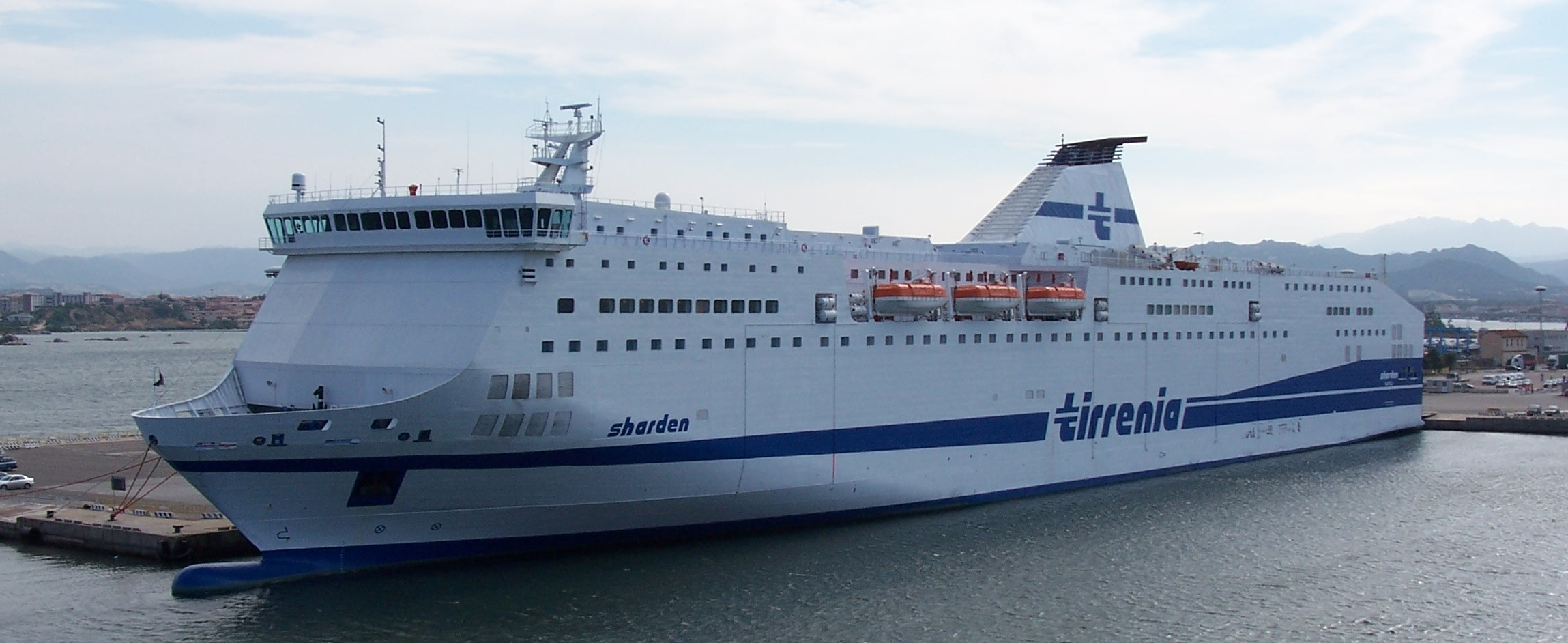
M/S Sharden in Olbia.

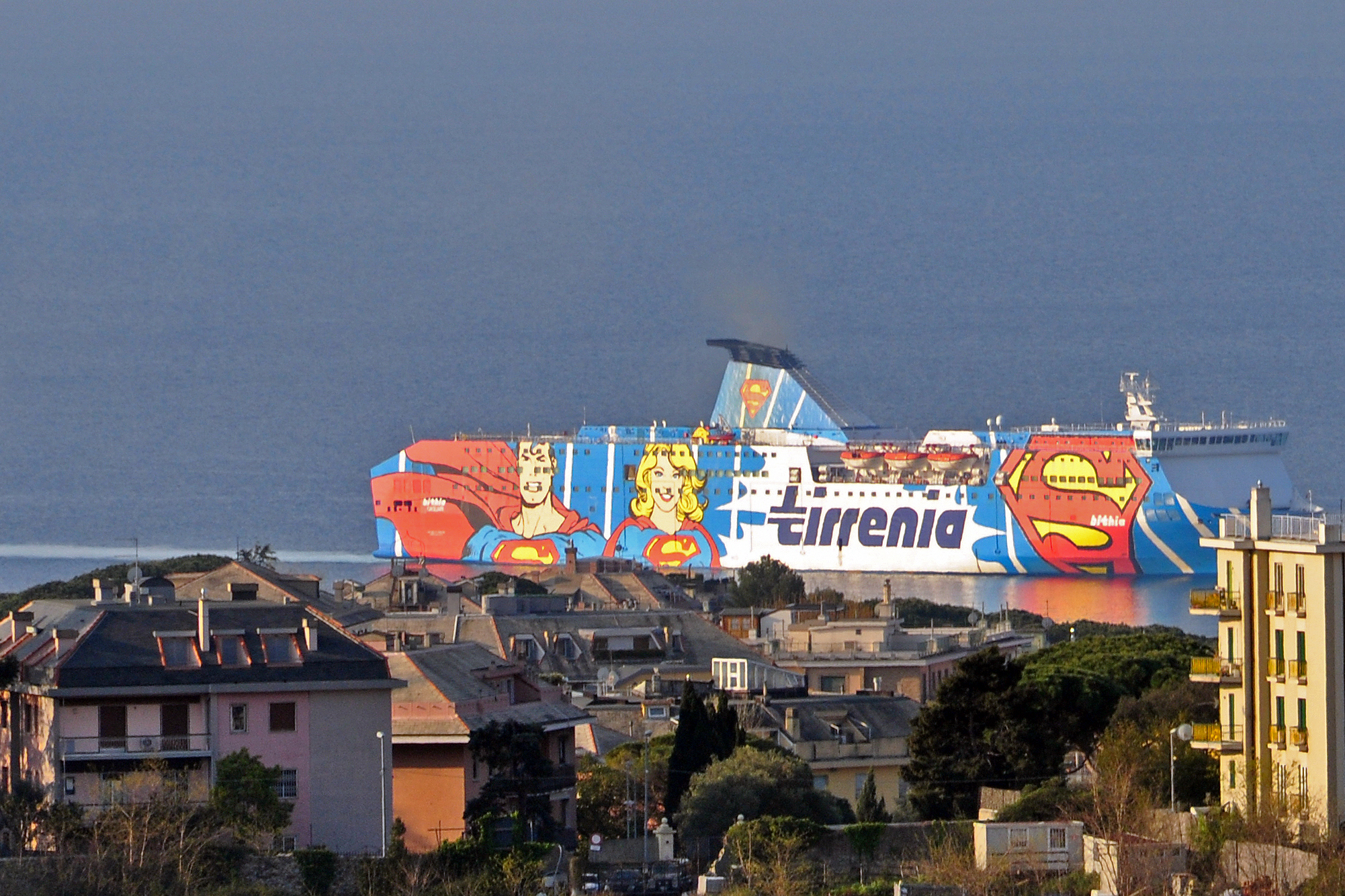
M/S Bithia to Genoa.

House flag of Tirrenia

== See also ==
- Caremar
- Saremar
- Siremar
- Toremar
- Italian Navigation Company
- Florio United Fleets
- Adriatica Navigation
- Vincenzo Onorato

== Bibliography ==
- Balsamo, Bruno (2018). Le navi della Tirrenia [The Ships of the Tirrenia] (in Italian). Sorrento: Con-fine Edizioni di arte & cultura. ISBN 978-88-96427-73-6.
- Carboncini, Adriano Betti (2011). Linee di navigazione marittima per la Sardegna [Maritime shipping lines for Sardinia] (in Italian). Sassari: Carlo Delfino editore. ISBN 978-88-7138-551-8.
- Campodonico, Pierangelo (2020). Storia della marineria mercantile italiana Vol. 2 - 1915-1939 La prima guerra mondiale e il ventennio fascista [History of Italian merchant shipping Vol. 2 - 1915-1939 The First World War and the Fascist Twenty Years] (in Italian). Maree editore. ISBN 978-88-6373-738-7.
- Oligari, Francesco; Rastelli, Achille; Spazzapan, Giorgio; Zenoni, Alessandro (1985). Trasporti marittimi di linea, volume sesto - Gli anni della Fenice, il Gruppo Finmare, le compagnie sovvenzionate dal 1945 al 1985 [Liner shipping, volume six - The Phoenix years, the Finmare Group, the subsidized companies from 1945 to 1985] (in Italian). Milan: Cavallotti Editori.
- Pagano, Gian Paolo (1997). Navi mercantili perdute, 3ª ed [Lost merchant ships, 3rd ed.] (in Italian). Rome: Ufficio Storico della Marina Militare.
- Piccione, Paolo (2018). Le navi dei Florio - Storia delle attività armatoriali 1840 - 1931 [The ships of the Florios - History of shipowning activities 1840 - 1931] (in Italian). Palermo: Nuova Ipsa Editore srl. ISBN 978-88-7676-699-2.
- Trizio, Pasquale (2018). Adriatica Venezia (1932-2004) [Adriatica Venice (1932-2004)] (in Italian). Bari: Gelsorosso. ISBN 978-88-89735-28-2.
