= SNAV Virgo =

Fast ferry built in Italy

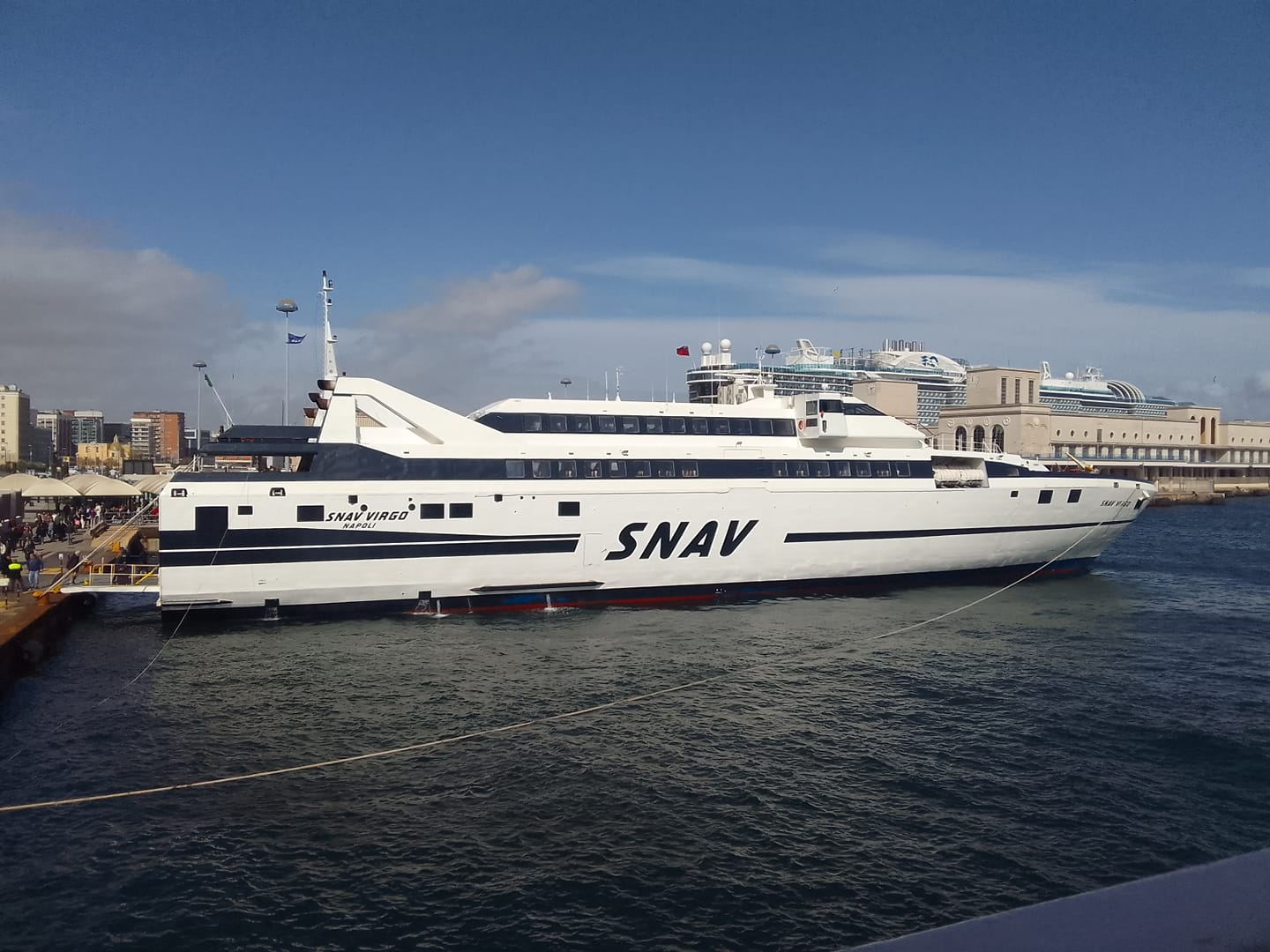
- SNAV Virgo in Naples

History
- Name: (1999–2024): Isola di Capraia; (2024–present): SNAV Virgo
- Owner: (1999–2007): Toremar; (2007–2012): Tirrenia di Navigazione; (2012–2021): Compagnia Italiana di Navigazione (CIN Tirrenia); (2021–2022): NLG; (2022–2023): Caremar; (2023–present): SNAV (MSC Group)
- Operator: (1999–2007): Toremar; (2007–2021): Tirrenia / CIN; (2021–2022): NLG (charter); (2022–2023): Caremar; (2024–present): SNAV
- Port of registry: (1999–2007): Portoferraio, Italy; (2007–present): Naples, Italy
- Route: Naples – Castellammare di Stabia – Sorrento – Capri; Former: Termoli – Tremiti Islands (Tirrenia); Former: Piombino – Portoferraio (Toremar)
- Ordered: 1997
- Builder: Rodriquez Cantieri Navali; Pietra Ligure, Italy
- Yard number: 268
- Laid down: 1998
- Launched: 1999
- Completed: June 1999
- Acquired: June 1999 (by Toremar) 2007 (by Tirrenia) March 2024 (by SNAV)
- Maiden voyage: June 1999
- In service: 1999
- Identification: IMO number: 9166182; Call sign: IBIB; MMSI number: 247388000
- Status: In service

General characteristics
- Class & type: Rodriquez TM 71 (Aquastrada TMV 70) Fast Monohull
- Tonnage: 1,927 GT; 200 DWT
- Length: 70.90 m (232 ft 7 in)
- Beam: 12.40 m (40 ft 8 in)
- Draught: 2.39 m (7 ft 10 in)
- Decks: 3
- Ramps: Stern loading ramps
- Installed power: 4 × MTU 16V 4000 marine diesel engines (total 9,280 kW / 12,445 hp)
- Propulsion: 1 × Kamewa waterjet steering unit
- Speed: 28.0 knots (51.9 km/h; 32.2 mph) (service) / 32.0 knots (59.3 km/h; 36.8 mph) (max)
- Capacity: 522 passengers; 57 cars
- Crew: 12

SNAV Virgo is a 70.95-metre high-speed monohull ferry operated by SNAV. Built in 1999 by Rodriquez Cantieri Navali as Isola di Capraia for Toremar, she later served over a decade with Tirrenia on the Termoli–Tremiti route before brief periods with NLG and Caremar. Acquired and renamed by SNAV, the 28-knot waterjet-driven craft currently operates fast passenger and vehicle services across the Bay of Naples.

== Service ==
Launched on 21 November 1998 in the Rodriquez shipyards of Pietra Ligure with the name Isola di Capraia and delivered on 3 June 1999 to Toremar, it entered service in the same month on the connections between Piombino, Rio Marina and Porto Azzurro, joining the already present Planasia, and on those between Piombino and Portoferraio.

From 2003 to 2005 it was chartered during the winter period to Adriatica di Navigazione and used on the connections between Termoli and the Tremiti Islands. In the summer period, it returned to operate on the connections between Piombino and the Island of Elba. In 2005, with the entry into the fleet of the Giovanni Bellini and its use on the connections between Piombino, Rio Marina and Porto Azzurro, it was definitively transferred to the connections to the Tremiti Islands. In 2007 it was officially transferred to the Tirrenia di Navigazione flag, continuing to operate on the same route.

On 24 May 2020, it collided with the breakwater of the port of San Nicola due to a mechanical problem. It subsequently managed to free itself under its own power and, having suffered no significant damage, resumed regular service. In December 2021 it was sold to Caremar, being replaced on its route by the HSC Santa Lucia of the NLG.

Subsequently, it was transferred to Naples and immediately after it was occasionally used on the connections between Formia, Ponza and Ventotene for a short period. From November 2022 to April 2023 it underwent major restyling works "including the interiors which were totally renovated".

In May 2023 it entered service with Caremar livery for a very short period on the connections between Naples, Procida and Ischia. With the start of the summer season it was chartered to SNAV and entered service on the connections between Naples, Castellammare di Stabia, Sorrento and Capri; at the end of 2023 it was definitively purchased.

In January 2024 it was chartered to NLG and used on the connections between Termoli and the Tremiti Islands. Once the charter ended, it returned to operate for SNAV. In March 2024 it was renamed SNAV Virgo and officially transferred under the SNAV flag.

== Sister ships ==
- Isola di Capri
- Isola di Procida
- Isola di Vulcano
