= GNV Sirio =

Cruise ferry built in 2004

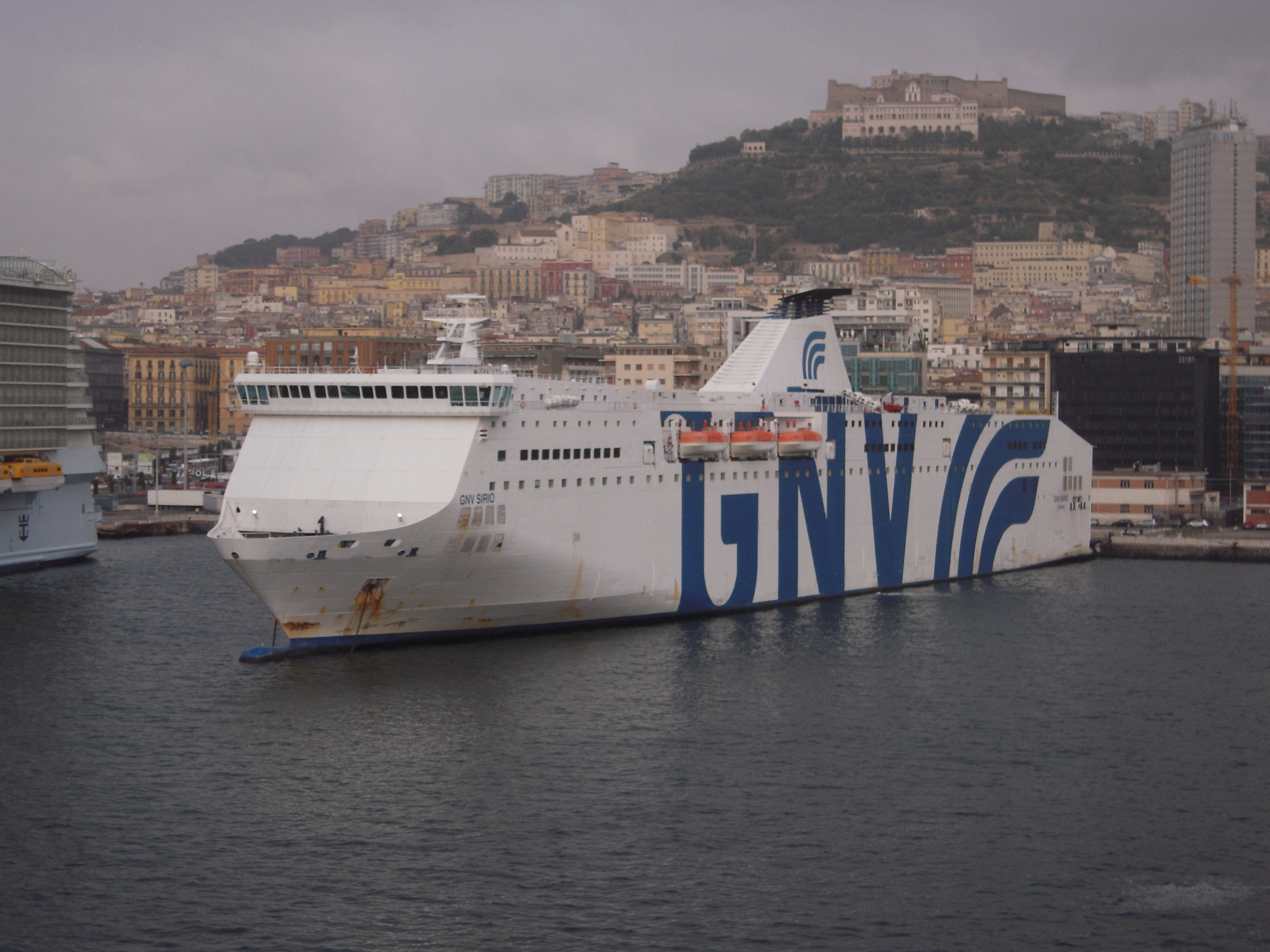
- GNV Sirio in Naples

History
- Name: (2004–2023): Nuraghes; (2023–2024): Moby Vinci; (2024–present): GNV Sirio
- Owner: (2004–2012): Tirrenia di Navigazione; (2012–2023): Compagnia Italiana di Navigazione (CIN Tirrenia); (2023–2024): Moby Lines; (2024–present): Grandi Navi Veloci (GNV) (MSC Group)
- Operator: (2004–2023): Tirrenia / CIN; (2023–2024): Moby Lines; (2024–present): Grandi Navi Veloci (GNV)
- Port of registry: (2004–present): Cagliari / Genova, Italy
- Route: Genoa – Palermo; Genoa – Porto Torres; Former: Civitavecchia – Olbia (Tirrenia); Former: Genoa – Olbia (Tirrenia / Moby)
- Ordered: 2002
- Builder: Fincantieri; Castellammare di Stabia, Italy
- Yard number: 6113
- Laid down: 2003
- Launched: 24 January 2004
- Completed: 15 July 2004
- Acquired: July 2004 (by Tirrenia) March 2024 (by GNV)
- Maiden voyage: July 2004
- In service: 2004
- Identification: IMO number: 9293404; Call sign: IBLS; MMSI number: 247106500
- Status: In service

General characteristics
- Class & type: Bithia-class Fast Cruise Ferry (Nuraghes-class)
- Tonnage: 39,798 GT; 5,000 DWT
- Length: 214.00 m (702 ft 1 in)
- Beam: 26.40 m (86 ft 7 in)
- Draught: 6.90 m (22 ft 8 in)
- Decks: 9
- Ramps: Bow and stern loading ramps
- Installed power: 4 × Wärtsilä 12V46C marine diesel engines (total 51,360 kW / 68,875 hp)
- Propulsion: 2 × controllable pitch propellers
- Speed: 29.0 knots (53.7 km/h; 33.4 mph) (service) / 29.5 knots (54.6 km/h; 33.9 mph) (max)
- Capacity: 2,908 passengers (319 cabins); 1,080 vehicles / 1,900 lane metres for freight
- Crew: 50–60

GNV Sirio is a cruiseferry owned and operated by Grandi Navi Veloci. It was built in 2004 as Nuraghes by Fincantieri at Castellammare di Stabia, Italy. In 2023, it was transferred to Moby Lines and renamed Moby Vinci. The ship reverted to Grandi Navi Veloci in 2024, taking the name GNV Sirio.

== Features ==
Nuraghes was the first of two sister ships, the other being Sharden. They are an improved version of the previous Bithia-class, with an additional car deck, bringing their gross register tonnage to nearly 40,000 GT, and allowing a greater cargo capacity (nearly 2,000 lane meters, equivalent to about 140 semi-trailers), or 1,085 cars. The ship can carry up to 3,000 passengers and has nine decks:

- Deck 8: infirmary, kennels, solarium
- Deck 7: children's area, 648 second class seats, 68 cabins
- Deck 6: reception, central bar, bar of the festivals, cinema, restaurant, self-service, shops.
- Deck 5: 258 cabins
- Deck 4: mobile car deck for 265 cars
- Deck 4: car deck for 373 cars or 70 trailers
- Deck 3: car deck for 335 cars or 65 trailers
- Deck 2: car deck for 60 cars
- Deck 1: car deck for 52 cars

Despite the additional deck, and the consequent increase in displacement, the ships are propelled by the same diesel engines as the Bithia-class. Four Wärtsilä 12V46C engines generate more than 51,000 kW, producing a top speed of 29 knots (53.70 km/h). This performance is fully exploited only for the daytime crossings and in the high season, i.e., when passenger and vehicle traffic justifies the larger fuel consumption; otherwise, the ship keeps a speed between 19 and 23 knots, by using only two of its four engines, in order to save fuel.

== History ==
=== Nuraghes ===
Nuraghes was launched by Fincantieri on January 24, 2004. and entered service on the Civitavecchia-Olbia line on 15 July 2004.

Two months later, at about 20:00 on 17 September 2004, Nuraghes was rammed by GNV's ferry La Superba while the latter was mooring in Olbia harbour. Nuraghes had been moored in Dock 3 since that morning, and was waiting to leave for Civitavecchia at 23:00. At the time of the collision, only the crew was aboard. Nuraghes suffered damage to the bow, the bridge, and part of the stern; a lifeboat fell into the sea, while an inflatable raft remained hanging in midair. After inspection by the Italian Naval Register, the ship sailed late for Civitavecchia. The accident was blamed on the commander of La Superba, not obtaining the support of a tug boat, despite the bad weather.

On 21 June 2006, around 13:00 hours, Nuraghes, sailing from Civitavecchia to Olbia, was rammed by Moby Lines's ferry the Moby Fantasy in the Gulf of Olbia. Moby Fantasy's bow created a gash in Nuraghes's side, but there no serious personal injuries. According to the Italian public prosecutor, responsibility laid with the commander of Nuraghes, which did not respect the precedence and kept a speed of 28 knots. A contributing cause was the lack of visibility present in that moment in the Gulf. In addition, emergency sound signals were not used and the radio communications were inadequate.

=== Moby Vinci ===
Nuraghes was transferred to Moby Lines on 18 April 2023 and renamed Moby Vinci. It operate on the Genoa-Porto Torres, Livorno-Olbia, and Civitavecchia-Olbia routes.

=== GNV Sirio ===
In March 2024, Moby Vinci was returned to Grandi Navi Veloci and renamed GNV Sirio for the route between Genoa, Porto Torres, Olbia and Palermo.

== See also ==
- Largest ferries of Europe
