= GNV Auriga =

Cruiseferry

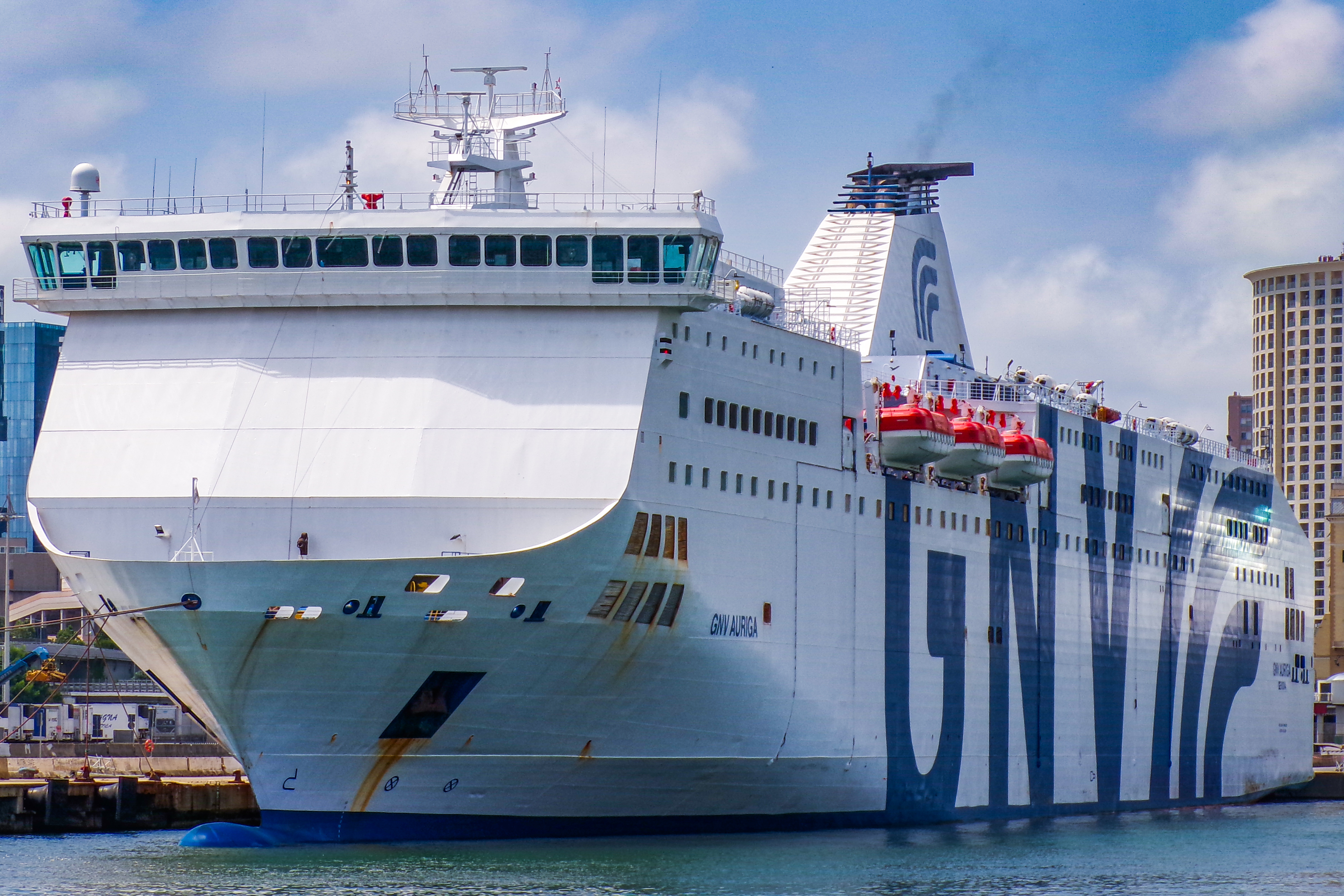
- GNV Auriga in Livorno

History
- Name: (2005–2024): Sharden; (2024–present): GNV Auriga
- Owner: (2005–2012): Tirrenia di Navigazione; (2012–2024): Compagnia Italiana di Navigazione (CIN Tirrenia); (2024–present): Grandi Navi Veloci (GNV) (MSC Group)
- Operator: (2005–2024): Tirrenia / CIN; (2024–present): Grandi Navi Veloci (GNV)
- Port of registry: (2005–present): Cagliari / Napoli, Italy
- Route: Genoa – Porto Torres; Civitavecchia – Palermo / Tunis; Naples – Palermo; Former: Civitavecchia – Olbia (Tirrenia); Former: Genoa – Olbia (Tirrenia)
- Ordered: 2003
- Builder: Fincantieri; Castellammare di Stabia, Italy
- Yard number: 6114
- Laid down: 2003
- Launched: 2004
- Completed: March 2005
- Acquired: March 2005 (by Tirrenia) March 2024 (by GNV)
- Maiden voyage: March 2005
- In service: 2005
- Identification: IMO number: 9305269; Call sign: IBLN; MMSI number: 247130700
- Status: In service

General characteristics
- Class & type: Bithia-class Fast Cruise Ferry (Nuria-class)
- Tonnage: 39,798 GT; 7,031 DWT
- Length: 214.00 m (702 ft 1 in)
- Beam: 26.40 m (86 ft 7 in)
- Draught: 7.00 m (23 ft 0 in)
- Decks: 10
- Ramps: Bow and stern loading ramps
- Installed power: 4 × Wärtsilä 12V46C marine diesel engines (total 50,400 kW / 67,587 hp)
- Propulsion: 2 × controllable pitch propellers
- Speed: 28.0 knots (51.9 km/h; 32.2 mph) (service) / 29.5 knots (54.6 km/h; 33.9 mph) (max)
- Capacity: 2,908 passengers (319 cabins); 1,080 cars / 2,000 lane metres for freight
- Crew: 50–60

GNV Auriga is a cruiseferry owned and operated by Grandi Navi Veloci. It was built in Fincantieri in Castellammare di Stabia, Italy.

== Features ==
Sharden is the second of two sister ships, the other being Nuraghes. They are an improved version of the previous Bithia class with an additional car deck which brings their gross tonnage to nearly 40,000 and allows nearly 2,000 linear meters greater cargo capacity, the equivalent of about 140 semi-trailers, or 1,085 cars. The ship can carry up to 3,000 passengers and has nine decks:

- Deck 8: infirmary, kennels, and solarium
- Deck 7: children's area, 648 second class seats, and 68 cabins
- Deck 6: reception, central bar, bar of the festivals, cinema, restaurant, self-service, and shops
- Deck 5: 258 cabins
- Deck 4: mobile car deck for 265 cars
- Deck 4: car deck for 373 cars or 70 trailers
- Deck 3: car deck for 335 cars or 65 trailers
- Deck 2: car deck for 60 cars
- Deck 1: car deck for 52 cars

Despite the addition of a deck, and the consequent increase in displacement, the same diesel engines as the Bithia class were employed. Four Wärtsilä 12V46C engines generate a power of more than 51,000 kW. These engines allow the ship to reach a top speed of 29 knots (53.70 km/h). Top performance is fully exploited only for the daytime crossings and in the high season, i.e. when passenger and vehicle traffic justifies the larger fuel consumption; otherwise, the ship keeps a speed that allows it to save fuel, usually between 19 and 23 knots by using only two of its four engines.

== History ==
Sharden was launched by Fincantieri on September 28, 2004, and delivered to Tirrenia on March 2, 2005. entering service in mid-March on the Civitavecchia-Olbia route.

On February 3, 2012, while leaving Civitavecchia heading for Olbia, Sharden struck the breakwater due to the strong winds and an exceptional snowstorm raging throughout central Italy that reduced visibility. The accident resulted in a hole about 30 meters above the waterline. None of the 262 passengers and 53 crew members were injured.

On July 13, 2016, Sharden collided with the GNV's ferry Excelsior in Genoa harbor due to 25 knot wind speeds; neither ship suffered significant damage.

On November 15, 2016, the body of a German passenger who had gone missing two months before was found in a ventilation shaft inside the ship.

Sharden is currently operated on the Genoa-Porto Torres route.

== See also ==
- Largest ferries of Europe
