= Ciudad de Valencia =

Ferry built in 2020

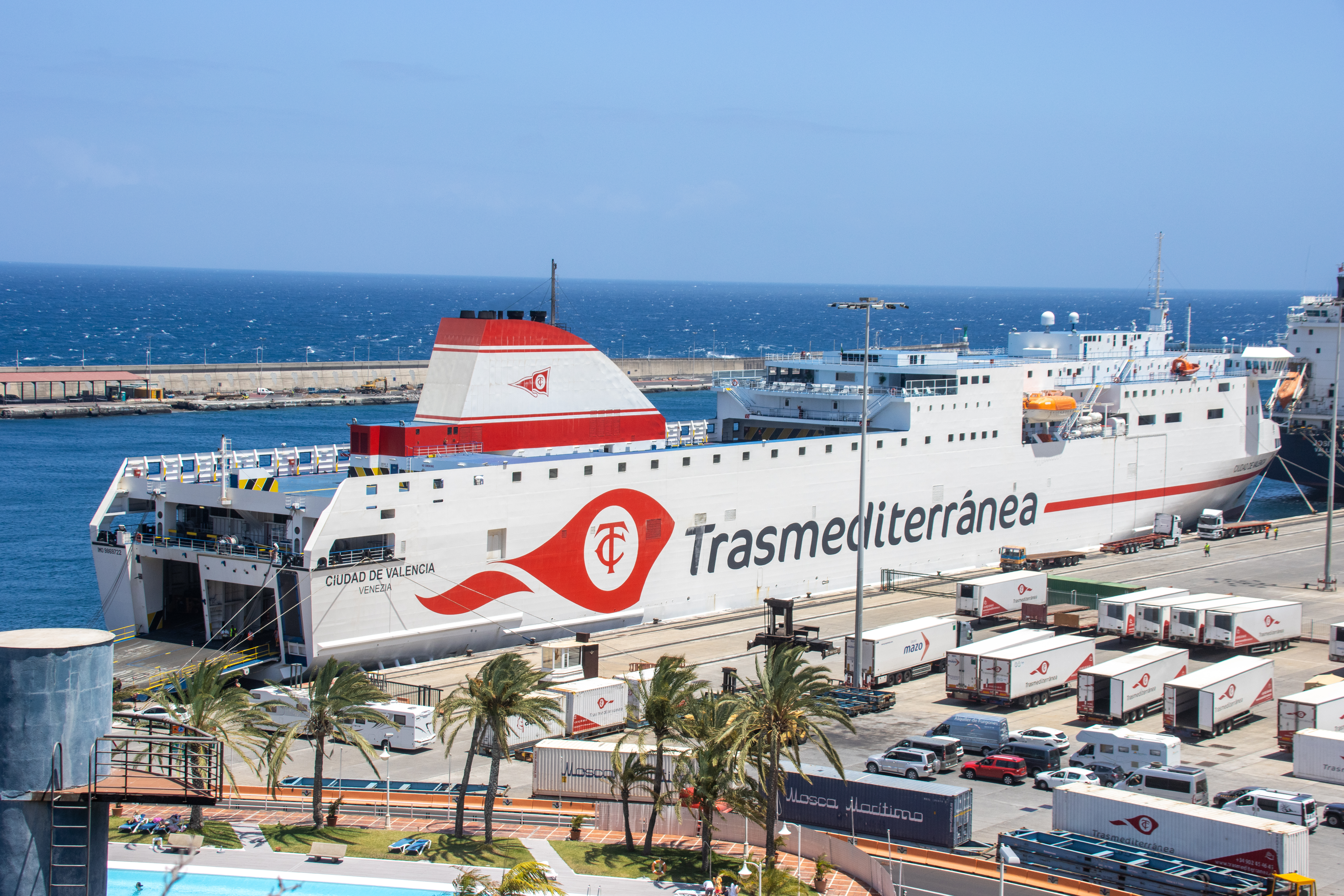
- Ciudad de Valencia in Las Palmas

History
- Name: 2020–present: Ciudad de Valencia
- Owner: 2020–present: Visemar di Navigazione
- Operator: 2020–2026: Trasmediterránea / Naviera Armas (charter); 2026: DFDS (charter); 2026–present: Baleària (charter)
- Port of registry: 2019–2020: Limassol, Cyprus; 2020–present: Venice, Italy
- Route: Valencia – Palma de Mallorca; Former: Cádiz – Canary Islands
- Ordered: 14 June 2019
- Builder: Cantiere Navale Visentini; Porto Viro, Italy
- Yard number: 229
- Laid down: 21 December 2009
- Launched: 15 October 2019
- Completed: 18 July 2020
- Acquired: 4 August 2020
- Maiden voyage: 11 August 2020
- In service: 2020
- Identification: IMO number: 9869722; Call sign: IBZX; MMSI number: 247432300
- Status: in service

General characteristics
- Class & type: NAOS P370 / Visentini Class Ro-Pax
- Tonnage: 32,581 GT; 8,625 DWT
- Length: 203.28 m (666 ft 11 in)
- Beam: 25.6 m (84 ft 0 in)
- Height: 15 m (49 ft 3 in)
- Draft: 6.55 m (21 ft 6 in)
- Ramps: Stern vehicle loading ramp
- Installed power: 2 × MaK 12VM43C main diesel engines (total 25,200 kW)
- Propulsion: 2 × controllable pitch propellers
- Speed: 23.7 knots (43.9 km/h; 27.3 mph)
- Capacity: 975 passengers (157 passenger cabins); 263 cars and 2,566 lane metres for freight
- Crew: 25
- Notes: Sister ship to Superfast V

Ciudad de Valencia is a 203.28-metre Ro-Pax ferry built in 2020 by Cantiere Navale Visentini in Porto Viro, Italy. Owned by Visemar di Navigazione, she operated for several years under charter for Spanish company Trasmediterránea / Naviera Armas, before being chartered to Baleària and DFDS.

== Service ==
The ferry, the first of a series of two twin units, was commissioned on 14 June 2019 by Trasmediterránea at the Cantiere Navale Visentini, from which it was launched on 15 October with the name Ciudad de Valencia in the Porto Viro shipyard. Following this, on 20 June 2020, upon completion of the works, the ferry set sail from the Polesine shipyard for the Adriatic, where it carried out the preparatory sea trials, at the end of which it was transferred to the Trieste shipyards, where it was prepared for delivery. On 30 July, after completing the technical stop in Friuli-Venezia Giulia, the ferry set sail from Venice to Cadiz, where on 4 August it was handed over on long-term charter to the Spanish company, for which it finally began service on 11 August on the connections between the Andalusian port, Las Palmas de Gran Canaria, Santa Cruz de Tenerife, Puerto del Rosario, Arrecife and Santa Cruz de la Palma, replacing the Ciudad de Palma.

On 1 April 2026, after approximately four years of service on the routes between Cadiz and the Canary Islands, the ferry was chartered to DFDS, from which it will be deployed on the routes between Karlshamn and Klaipėda, replacing the Optima Seaways, alongside the twins Victoria Seaways and Athena Seaways. On 2 June, a few months after the announcement of the new deployment in the Baltic Sea, Baleària, the other buyer together with DFDS of the assets of Trasmediterránea, announced that it will be deployed on the routes between Valencia and Palma de Mallorca for the entire summer season. Following this, on 23 June the ferry sailed from Cadiz on her final crossing to the Canaries, after which, on 29 June, upon returning to Andalusia, she set sail for the Balearic Sea. where she entered service on 1 July.

== Technical specifications and equipment ==
The ship is powered by two four-stroke, twelve-cylinder diesel engines manufactured by Caterpillar (type: MaK 12VM43C), each with an output of 12,600 kW. The engines drive two controllable pitch propellers. For power generation, there are two shaft generators driven by the main engines, each with an output of 2,000 kW, and three generators driven by diesel engines, each with an output of 2,000 kW. The ship is equipped with two bow thrusters, each with an output of 1,300 kW . There are five cargo decks on board (decks 1 to 5). At the stern, there is a drop-down ramp providing access to the cargo deck on the main deck (deck 3) and, via a fixed ramp on board, to the cargo deck on deck 4. Another fixed ramp connects decks 3 and 1. Decks 2 and 5 are accessible via movable ramps. These two decks are designed for the transport of cars, while the other three decks can accommodate trucks and other cargo units. The uppermost deck, deck 5, is an open cargo deck. The ramp to this deck also serves as a weatherproof closure for the cargo decks below. There are 2,564 lane meters available for the transport of trucks. The car capacity is stated as 240 vehicles.

At the stern, on the starboard side, there is another drop-down ramp that can be used for passenger access. The facilities for passengers and crew are located in the superstructure in the forward half of the ship. Passengers have access to a fast-food restaurant and a bar, among other amenities. The ship has 157 passenger cabins: 151 four-berth cabins and four two-berth cabins, two of which are accessible for passengers with disabilities. There are also 189 reclining seats available for passengers. The crew has 36 cabins with a total of 58 beds.

The bridge is located at the front of the ship. It is enclosed across its entire width. For better visibility when docking, undocking, and maneuvering in narrow channels, the cleats extend slightly beyond the ship's beam. The forecastle is covered.
