= Ciudad de Palma =

Ferry built in Italy

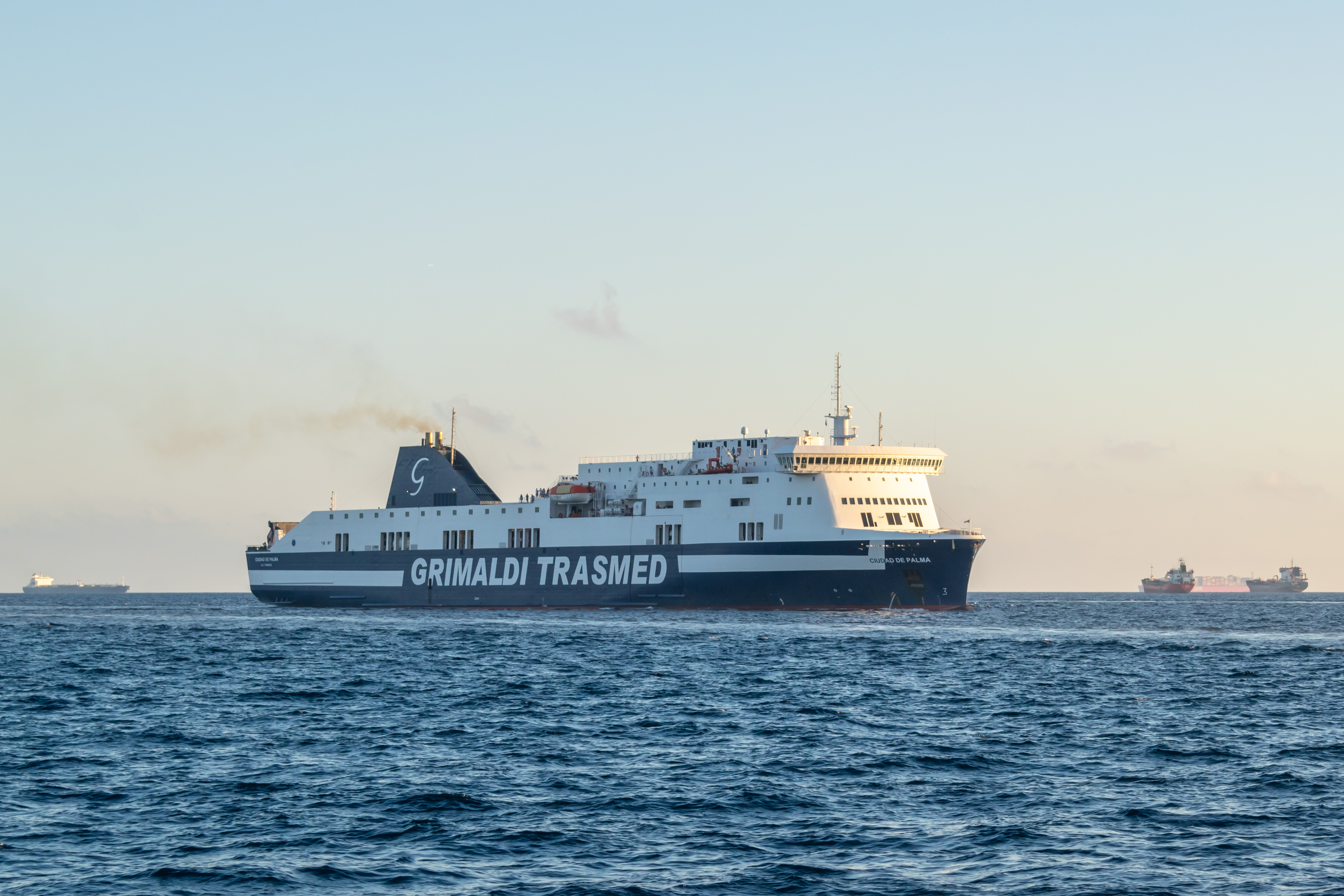
- Ciudad de Palma in Barcelona

History
- Name: 2007–2009: Borja Dos; 2009–2011: T Rex Uno; 2011–2018: Dimonios; 2018–present: Ciudad de Palma
- Owner: 2007–2013: Visemar di Navigazione; 2013–2017: Tirrenia CIN; 2017–2021: Trasmediterránea; 2021–present: Grimaldi Group
- Operator: 2007–2009: Baleària; 2011–2012: Saremar; 2013–2017: Tirrenia CIN; 2017–2021: Trasmediterránea; 2021–present: Grimaldi Trasmed
- Port of registry: 2007–2017: Bari, Italy; 2017–2021: Limassol, Cyprus; 2021–present: Santa Cruz de Tenerife, Spain
- Route: Barcelona – Palma de Mallorca; Valencia – Palma de Mallorca
- Builder: Cantiere Navale Visentini; Porto Viro, Italy
- Yard number: 218
- Laid down: 30 December 2004
- Launched: 28 June 2007
- Completed: 19 October 2007
- Maiden voyage: October 2007
- In service: 28 October 2007
- Identification: IMO number: 9349772; Call sign: EAMS; MMSI number: 209042000
- Status: in service

General characteristics
- Class & type: NAOS P256 (Visentini Class)
- Tonnage: 27,105 GT; 7,000 DWT
- Length: 186.46 m (611 ft 9 in)
- Beam: 25.60 m (84 ft 0 in)
- Height: 9.15 m (30 ft 0 in)
- Draft: 6.71 m (22 ft 0 in)
- Ramps: Stern vehicle loading ramp
- Ice class: 1A
- Installed power: 2 × MAN 9L48/60B diesel engines (total 21,600 kW)
- Propulsion: 2 × controllable pitch propellers
- Speed: 20.5 knots (38.0 km/h; 23.6 mph) (service) / 24.0 knots (44.4 km/h; 27.6 mph) (max)
- Capacity: 878 passengers (122 cabins / 480 berths); 350 cars / 2,256 lane metres
- Crew: 38
- Notes: Sister ship to Connemara

Ciudad de Palma is an 186.5-metre Italian-built Ro-Pax ferry operated by Grimaldi Trasmed on routes connecting mainland Spain with the Balearic Islands. Built in 2007 by Cantiere Navale Visentini, the vessel previously operated under several names, including Borja Dos, T Rex Uno, and Dimonios, before receiving her current name in 2018.

== Service ==
The ferry, initially commissioned by Stena Line to the Visentini Shipyard and then sold during construction to the Spanish Baleària, was launched on 28 June 2007 in the Porto Viro shipyard with the name Borja Dos and delivered on 19 October following in long-term charter to the Spanish company, through the subsidiary Visemar di Navigazione. Following this, on 26 October the ferry arrived in Valencia, which two days later began connecting to Palma de Mallorca. Following this, on 26 October the ferry arrived in Valencia, which two days later began connecting to Palma de Mallorca.

In April 2009, with the entry into service of the new Martin i Soler, the ferry was returned to the Italian shipyard, from which it was chartered to the compatriot T-Link, being introduced on the connections between Voltri and Termini Imerese, paired with the T Rex, as part of the development of the motorways of the sea. In June it was then renamed T Rex Uno. However, in February 2010, with the charter of the Akerman Street and the Watling Street, the ferry was again returned to Visemar Navigazione, from which it was again chartered to Baleària, resuming service on the connections between Barcelona and Palma de Mallorca, replacing the Borja.

On 12 June 2011, with the entry into service of the new Visemar One, by which it was replaced, the ferry was finally transferred to the connections between Valencia, Palma de Mallorca and Ibiza, operating there only for about two weeks, until it was chartered to Saremar, by which it was renamed Dimonios and introduced on 22 June to the connections between Vado Ligure and Porto Torres, where it operated until 16 September, the day on which it sailed to Livorno, where the following day it was laid up.

On 16 January 2012, after a few months of lay-up in Livorno, the ferry was put on the connections between Civitavecchia and Olbia, where it joined the Scintu, operating there as well until 16 September, when it was again laid up in the Livorno port and subsequently transferred on 26 October to Castellammare di Stabia, awaiting further employment. On 15 November it was then chartered to Grandi Navi Veloci, from which it was put on the connections between Genoa and Palermo, replacing the units of the Genoese company's fleet, stopped for the performance of some ordinary maintenance work. On 28 December, at the end of its service, the Dimonios was finally chartered for five years, with an option to purchase, to Tirrenia CIN, from which it was introduced on the connections, mainly freight, between Livorno and Cagliari, and from 29 May 2013, on those between the Sardinian port, Naples and Palermo, on both routes as a replacement for the Toscana, which was simultaneously sold to Adria Ferries. In January 2013 it was purchased outright by Tirrenia CIN .

In March 2017, after approximately four years of service on freight connections between Tuscany, Sardinia, Campania and Sicily, the ferry was chartered to the Spanish company Trasmediterránea, from which it was introduced on 20 March on connections between Barcelona, Ibiza, Mahón and Palma de Mallorca, replacing the SNAV Adriatico. On 15 June it was then purchased outright by the Spanish company for 54 million euros, by which it was renamed Ciudad de Palma on 23 November 2018.

On 19 July 2021, after approximately four years of service on the connections between the Catalan port and the Balearics, the ferry was sold together with the assets, all the company's routes to and from the Balearics and fleetmates Ciudad de Granada, Ciudad de Mahón and Volcán del Teide to the Grimaldi Group, by which they were all continued to be employed on their own routes, under the banner of the newly formed Trasmed GLE.

On 13 December 2021, the ferry was transferred to the Muggiano shipyards, near La Spezia, where it underwent a series of renovation works, during which it was repainted in the Trasmed GLE livery and smokestack scrubbers were installed. On 21 January 2022, at the end of the works, the ferry resumed service in the Balearic Sea.

== Technical specifications and equipment ==
The ship is powered by two MAN 9L48/60 diesel engines, each with an output of 10,800 kW. The engines drive two controllable pitch propellers. The ship is equipped with two bow thrusters, each with an output of 1,300 kW. Two generators, each driven by diesel engines with an output of 1,800 kW, provide electricity. In the winter of 2021/22, the ship was modernized and, among other things, equipped with scrubbers for exhaust gas aftertreatment.

The ferry has four vehicle decks. These are accessible via two access points behind a stern ramp. One access point leads via fixed ramps to the lower deck with a usable height of approximately 4 meters and to a car deck with a usable height of just under 2 meters. The other access point leads to a deck with a usable height of just under 4.9 meters and the open weather deck, whose usable height is limited to approximately 5.1 meters by the access point. Next to the stern ramp for accessing the vehicle decks is another stern ramp leading to an escalator that takes passengers to the passenger area of the ferry.

The ferry has a passenger capacity of 878 people and a car capacity of 190. There are 122 passenger cabins and 34 reclining seats on board. Passengers have access to a self-service restaurant, a bar and cafeteria, a shop, a fitness area, and a children's play area. The facilities for passengers and crew are located in the forward section of the superstructure above the car decks. The ferry is equipped with fin stabilizers. The ship's hull is ice-strengthened (ice class 1A). The bridge is closed across its entire width. For better visibility when docking and undocking, and when navigating in narrow channels, the cleats extend slightly beyond the ship's width.
