= Norse Merchant Ferries =

- Company type: Private
- Founded: 2001
- Fate: Acquired by Norfolkline 2005
- Headquarters: Liverpool, UK
- Key people: Derek Sloan {CEO
- Products: Ferries, passenger transportation, freight transportation
- Number of employees: 450
- Parent: Cenargo International Ltd (2002–2003); Norse Merchant Group Ltd (2003–2006)
- Website: http://www.norsemerchant.com

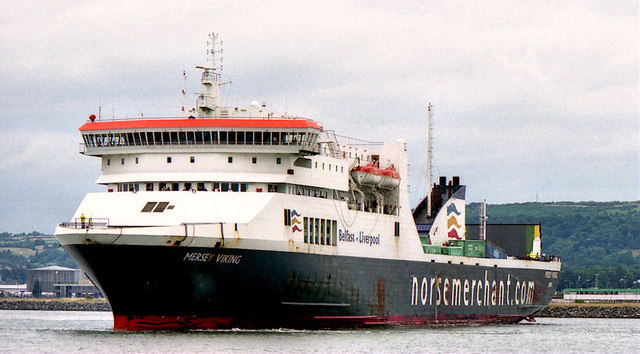
Mersey Viking in Belfast

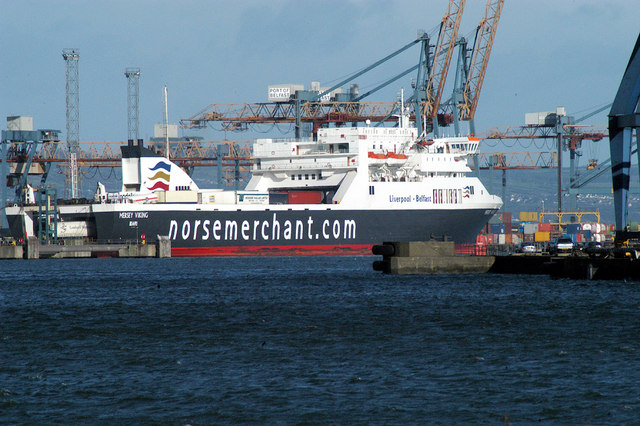
Mersey Viking in Norse Merchant livery

Norse Merchant Ferries was an Irish Sea ferry company that operating passenger and freight RORO services between England the Republic of Ireland and Northern Ireland.

== History ==
Norse Merchant Ferries was created in October 1999 when Cenargo, the owners of Merchant Ferries purchased Norse Irish Ferries. The two companies operated independently until February 2001, when Norse Merchant Ferries was formally established.

In January 2003 Cenargo filed voluntary petitions for relief under Chapter 11 of the United States Bankruptcy Code. The shipping subsidiaries of Cenargo emerged from administration in December 2003 as Norse Merchant Group.

In November 2005 the Norse Merchant Group was acquired by Maersk and integrated into Norfolkline

== Routes ==
Norse Merchant Ferries operated the following routes across the Irish Sea:

- Liverpool (Canada Dock) – Dublin
- Liverpool (Brocklebank Dock) – Belfast
- Heysham – Dublin (Freight only)
- Heysham – Belfast (Freight only)

Note: The Liverpool services where transferred to Birkenhead Twelve Quays in 2002

== Fleet ==
- Merchant Venture
- Lindarosa
- Norse Mersey
- Dawn Merchant
- Brave Merchant
- Merchant Bravery
- Merchant Brilliant
- RR Arrow
- RR Shield
- Saga Moon
- River Lune
- Liverpool Viking
- Dublin Viking
- Lagan Viking
- Mersey Viking
