= Atlante-class tugboat =

Class overview
- Name: Atlante
- Builders: Cantiere Navale Visentini Donada (Rovigo)
- Operators: Italian Navy
- Built: 1975
- In commission: 1976
- Planned: 2
- Building: 2
- Completed: 2
- Active: 1
- Retired: 1

General characteristics
- Type: Deep sea tugboats
- Displacement: 750 t (740 long tons) full load
- Length: 38.80 m (127 ft 4 in) LOA
- Beam: 9.60 m (31 ft 6 in)
- Height: 4.10 m (13 ft 5 in)
- Draught: 3.70 m (12 ft 2 in)
- Propulsion: - 1 x shaft; - 2 x diesel engines Grandi Motori Trieste BL-230-8M, 1.963 kW (2.632 bhp)
- Speed: 13.5 knots (25.0 km/h; 15.5 mph)
- Range: 4,000 nmi (7,400 km; 4,600 mi) at 12 knots (22 km/h; 14 mph)
- Crew: - 23, of which: - 1 official; - 22 sailors
- Sensors & processing systems: GEM Elettronica navigation radar MM/SPN-748

The Atlante class is a series of two Deep sea tugboatss of the Italian Navy.

== Ships ==
Atlante tugboats are equipped with a type Britannia tow cable with automatic release, long 400 m (diameter of 40 mm), with automatic towing winch for adjusting the shooting power.
They are equipped with exhaustion means for fire intervention on other units and a fixed installation for anti-pollution duties.

Italian Navy - Atlante class
Name	Pennant number	Laid down	Launched	Commissioned	Decommissioned	Motto
Atlante	A 5317	1974	1975	1976	10 October 2004	Su mundu accoddu
Prometeo	A 5318	1974	1975	1976		
