= Cook Strait ferry =

The Cook Strait ferry may refer to any of several ferries across the Cook Strait in New Zealand:

- Interislander
- StraitNZ
