= MS A Galeotta =

French RoPax

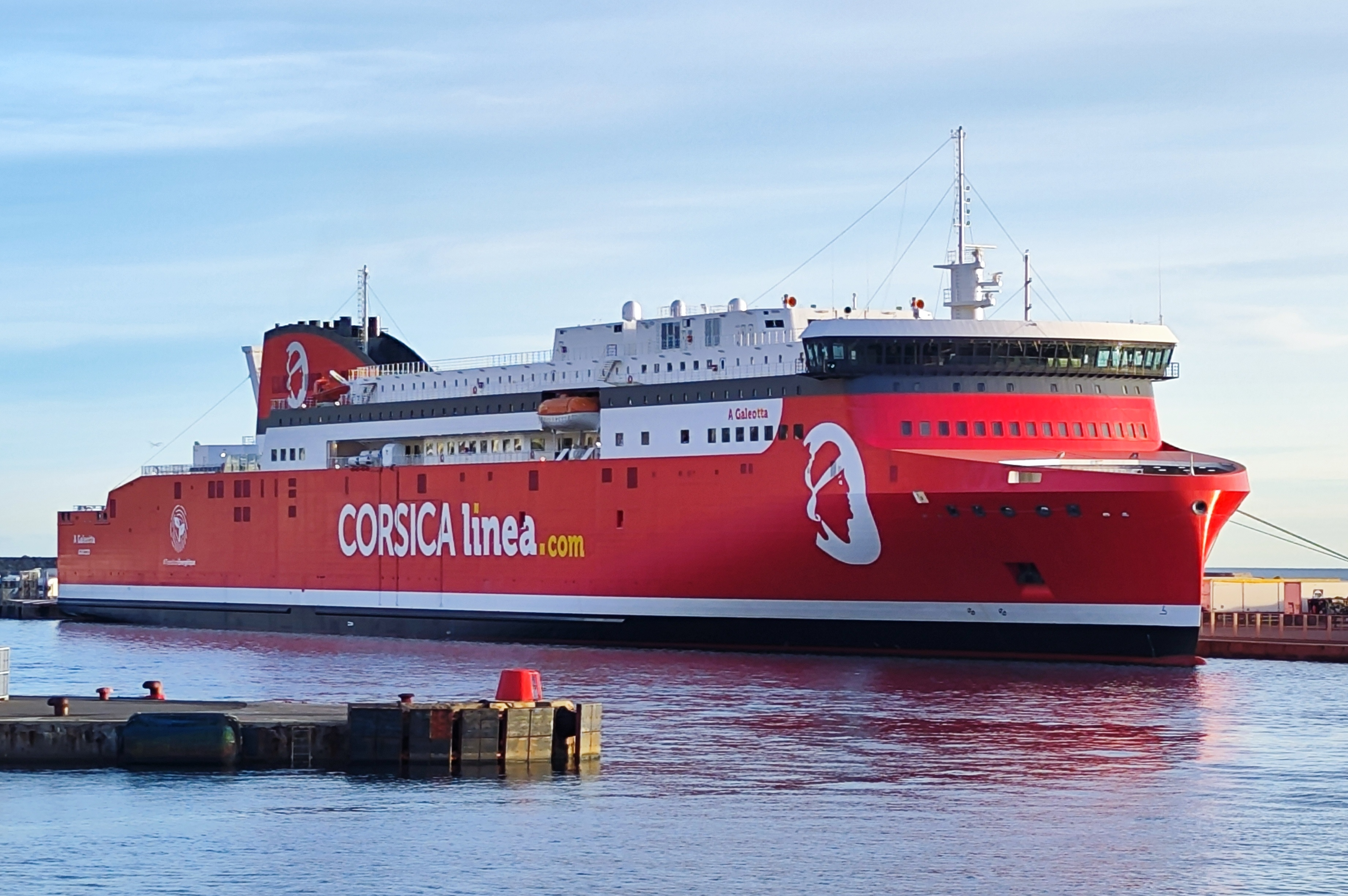
- MS A Galeotta

History
- Name: A Galeotta
- Owner: Corsica Linea
- Operator: Corsica Linea
- Port of registry: Ajaccio, France
- Ordered: 25 July 2019
- Builder: Cantiere Navale Visentini, Porto Viro, Italy
- Cost: €150 M
- Yard number: 238
- Laid down: 2 September 2020
- Launched: 19 September 2021
- Christened: 5 January 2023
- Completed: 6 December 2022
- Maiden voyage: 10 January 2023
- In service: 2023–present
- Identification: Call sign: FMSP; IMO number: 9891749; MMSI number: 228426700
- Status: In service

General characteristics
- Type: RoPax
- Tonnage: 37,599 GT
- Length: 206 m (675 ft 10 in)
- Beam: 28.20 m (92 ft 6 in)
- Draught: 6.7 m (22 ft 0 in)
- Installed power: 2 × Wärtsilä 12V50DF; 23,400 kW (combined)
- Propulsion: Two shafts; controllable pitch propellers
- Speed: 22 knots (41 km/h; 25 mph)
- Capacity: 930 passengers; 870 passenger beds; 150 vehicles; 170 trailers (2560 lane meters)
- Crew: 70

MS A Galeotta, is a French RoPax operated by Corsica Linea. She was built at Cantiere Navale Visentini in Porto Viro, Italy. She was put in January 2023 on the Marseille–Corsica route. A Galeotta is the first RoPax in service between Marseille and Corsica to be powered by liquefied natural gas (LNG).

== History ==
The vessel was ordered by Corsica Linea on 25 July 2019 to Cantiere Navale Visentini in Porto Viro. This is the first vessel with mixed diesel/LNG, and also the first new built RoPax ordered by the Corsican company. The project, known as P355, was designed by the Trieste-based studio Naos Ship Design and interiors by Studio Ancora.

The vessel was launched on 20 September 2021 and left the shipyard on 28 August 2022 year to reach Trieste, where the last interventions were carried out at the Fincantieri shipyards for the sea trials carried out in the following weeks. Once the sea trials were completed, A Galeotta was berthed at the passenger terminal in Venice to complete the final stages of the fitting out. The final delivery took place on 6 December 2022. A Galeotta entered service on 10 January 2023 on routes from Marseille to Bastia and Ajaccio.
