= RP 101-class tugboat =

Class overview
- Name: RP 101 class
- Builders: Cantiere Navale Visentini Donada (Rovigo).
- Operators: Italian Navy
- Building: 12
- Completed: 12
- Active: 10
- Retired: 2

General characteristics
- Type: Harbour tugboat
- Displacement: 85 t (84 long tons) full load
- Length: 19.8 m (65 ft) LOA
- Beam: 4.5 m (15 ft)
- Draught: 2.1 m (6.9 ft)
- Propulsion: - 1 x diesel engine Caterpillar D353, 321 kW (430 hp); - 1 x diesel engine generator Deutz F2-C-912, 15 kW (20 hp); - 1 x shaft; - 1 x (ducted) propeller
- Speed: 9.5 knots (17.6 km/h; 10.9 mph)
- Range: 400 nautical miles (740 km; 460 mi) at 9.5 knots (17.6 km/h; 10.9 mph)
- Crew: 3

The RP-101 class of Harbour tugboats consists of 12 units (first batch) built for the Marina Militare, named as Rimorchiatore Portuale.

== Ships ==
Italian Navy - RP 101 class / I batch
Name	Pennant number	Laid down	Launched	Commissioned	Decommissioned	Note
RP 101	Y 403	1972		1972		
RP 102	Y 404	1972		1972		
RP 103	Y 406	1974		1974	31 December 2012	
RP 104	Y 407	1974		1974		
RP 105	Y 408	1974		1974	31 December 2012	
RP 106	Y 410	1974		1974		
RP 107	Y 413	1974		1974		
RP 108	Y 452	1975		1975		
RP 109	Y 456	1975		1975		
RP 110	Y 458	1975		1975		
RP 111	Y 460	1975		1975		
RP 112	Y 462	1975		1975		
