= MS Santa Regina =

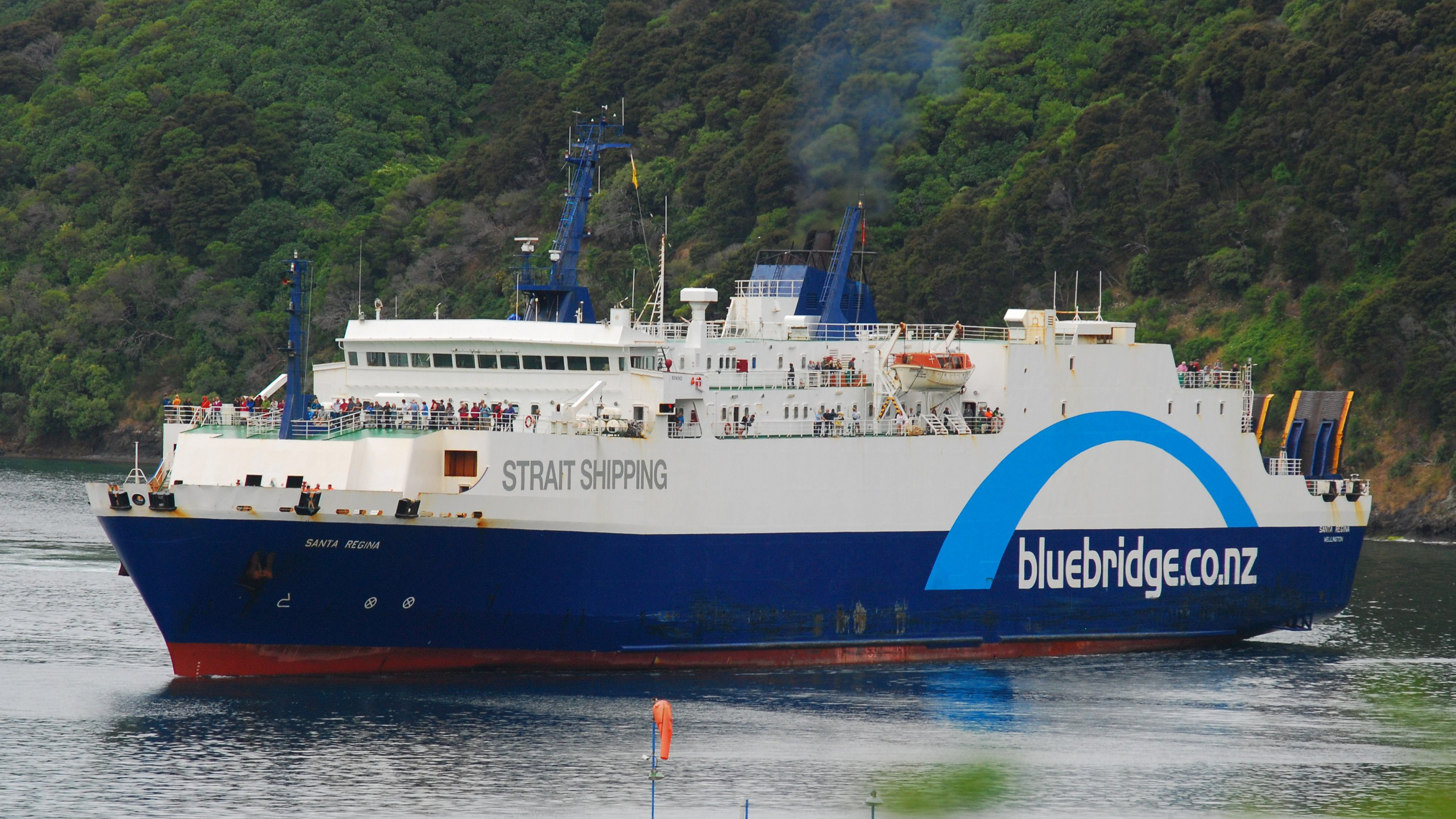

History
- Name: Santa Regina
- Operator: Strait Shipping
- Port of registry: New Zealand
- Builder: Ateliers et Chantiers du Havre, Le Havre, France
- Launched: 31 July 1984
- In service: 2002–2015 (in New Zealand)
- Identification: IMO number: 8314562

General characteristics
- Type: Roll-on/roll-off ferry
- Tonnage: 14,588 GT
- Length: 137 m (449 ft 6 in)
- Beam: 22.5 m (73 ft 10 in)
- Propulsion: 2 × SEMT Pielstick diesel engines
- Speed: 18 knots (33 km/h; 21 mph)
- Capacity: 370 passengers; 1,300 m (4,265 ft) lane for vehicles
- Notes: After temporarily appearing on ship tracking, believed to have been scrapped in Surabaya

MS Santa Regina is a roll-on/roll-off ferry that was in service for StraitNZ in New Zealand. The ferry was built for overnight services between Marseille and Corsica in the Mediterranean Sea in 1985. It was sold in 2002 as theSanta Regina for the Bluebridge ferry service, which runs from Wellington to Picton up to four times a day. Bluebridge competes with the longer running Interislander line, which also provides transport across Cook Strait.

In June 2015, it was replaced the by the Strait Feronia and sold to Indonesia as the Nusa Putera.

Santa Regina was renamed Nusa Putera and provides a ferry service to the Port of Merak in Indonesia. In October 2025, she appeared as sailing from Cilegon to Surabaya. It is believed the vessel has been or is in the process of being scrapped.
