= Norse Irish Ferries =

- Founded: 1991
- Defunct: 2001
- Successor: Norse Merchant Ferries
- Headquarters: Belfast, Northern Ireland
- Area served: Irish Sea
- Services: Passenger transportation Freight transportation

Norse Irish Ferries was an Irish Sea ferry company that operated a passenger and freight roll-on/roll-off service between Belfast and Liverpool.

== History ==
Norse Irish Ferries was formed as a joint venture between the Norwegian Roed Group and a consortium of hauliers who were discontented by the existing RoRo services on the Irish Sea. Following Belfast Car Ferries withdrawal from the Belfast – Liverpool route in October 1990 ferry services from Northern Ireland only operated to Stranraer and Cairnryan requiring a lengthy drive along single carriageway to reach England.

Sailings commenced in November 1991 using the Norse Lagan and Transgermania. Initially they operated a freight only service, passenger were later accepted onto sailing operated by the Norse Lagan.

In July 1997 Norse Irish Ferries took delivery of the first of two new Italian built vessels. The new vessels also introduced a new brand identity featuring a colourful viking ship sail.

In October 1999, Norse Irish Ferries was acquired by Cenargo for US$36 million. The operations of Norse Irish Ferries were merged with that of Merchant Ferries and Belfast Freight Ferries in February 2001 to create Norse Merchant Ferries.

== Fleet ==
Norse Irish Ferries operated 6 vessels during its 10 years of operation.

Name	Built	Tonnage	Passengers	Notes
Norse Lagan	1967	21,717	400	Sold to Moby Lines, Broken up 2007
Transgermania	1976	5,631	63	now Translandia with Eckerö Line
Norse Mersey	1969	20,914	150	now Claudia M with Ustica Lines
Norse Mersey	1995	14,820	25	now Eurocargo Napoli with Grimaldi Ferries
Mersey Viking	1997	21,856	340	now Stena Feronia with Stena Line
Lagan Viking	1997	21,856	340	now Liverpool Seaways with DFDS Seaways
