= Port of Nynäshamn =

Nynäshamn

Location
- Country: Sweden
- Location: Baltic Sea
- Coordinates: 58.9360840°N 17.9790841°E
- UN/LOCODE: SENYN

Details
- Owned by: Ports of Stockholm Group
- No. of berths: 9
- Draft depth: 17.3 metres (57 ft)

Statistics
- Website; Official website

The Port of Nynäshamn (Swedish: Nynäshamn) is a ferry terminal in the municipality of Nynäshamn, Sweden. The port is part of the Stockholm Ports.

From Nynäshamn there are services to Visby, Gdańsk and Ventspils. Ferry services to Gotland started as early as 1902.

There are three berths for roll-on/roll-off vessels, one used by Destination Gotland and the other by Polferries.

Nynäshamn carries 1.3 million passengers and 60 000 cargo units of goods per year. Nynäshamn also has an oil harbour.

== Ships serving the terminal ==
Company	Ship	Route	Notes
(Sweden) Destination Gotland	MS Drotten	Nynäshamn – Visby	
(Sweden) Destination Gotland	MS Gotland	Nynäshamn – Visby	
(Sweden) Destination Gotland	MS Visby	Nynäshamn – Visby	
(Poland) Polferries	MS Nova Star	Nynäshamn – Gdańsk	
(Poland) Polferries	MS Wawel	Nynäshamn – Gdańsk	

== Gallery ==
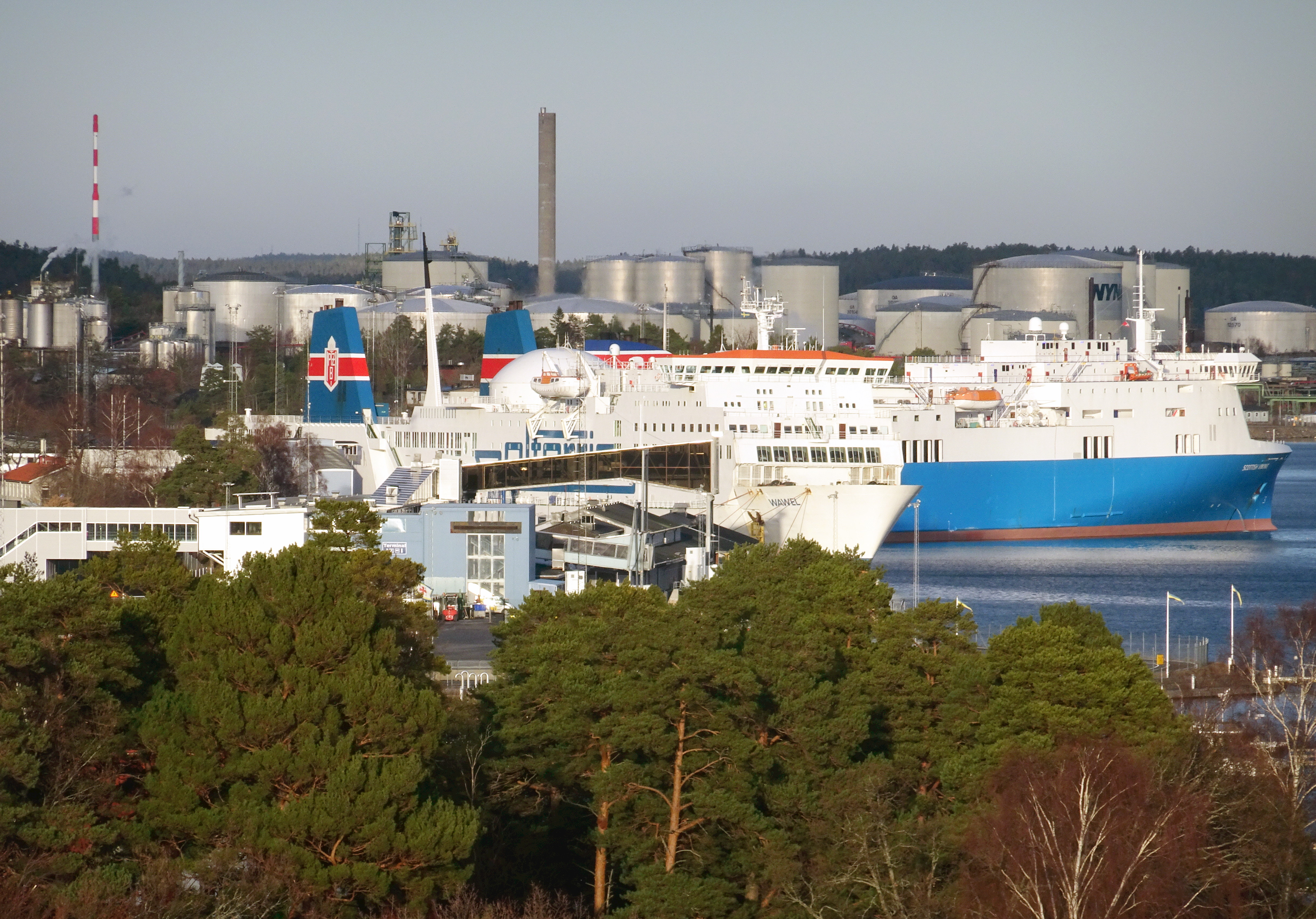
The harbor area from the view tower on Trehörningen.

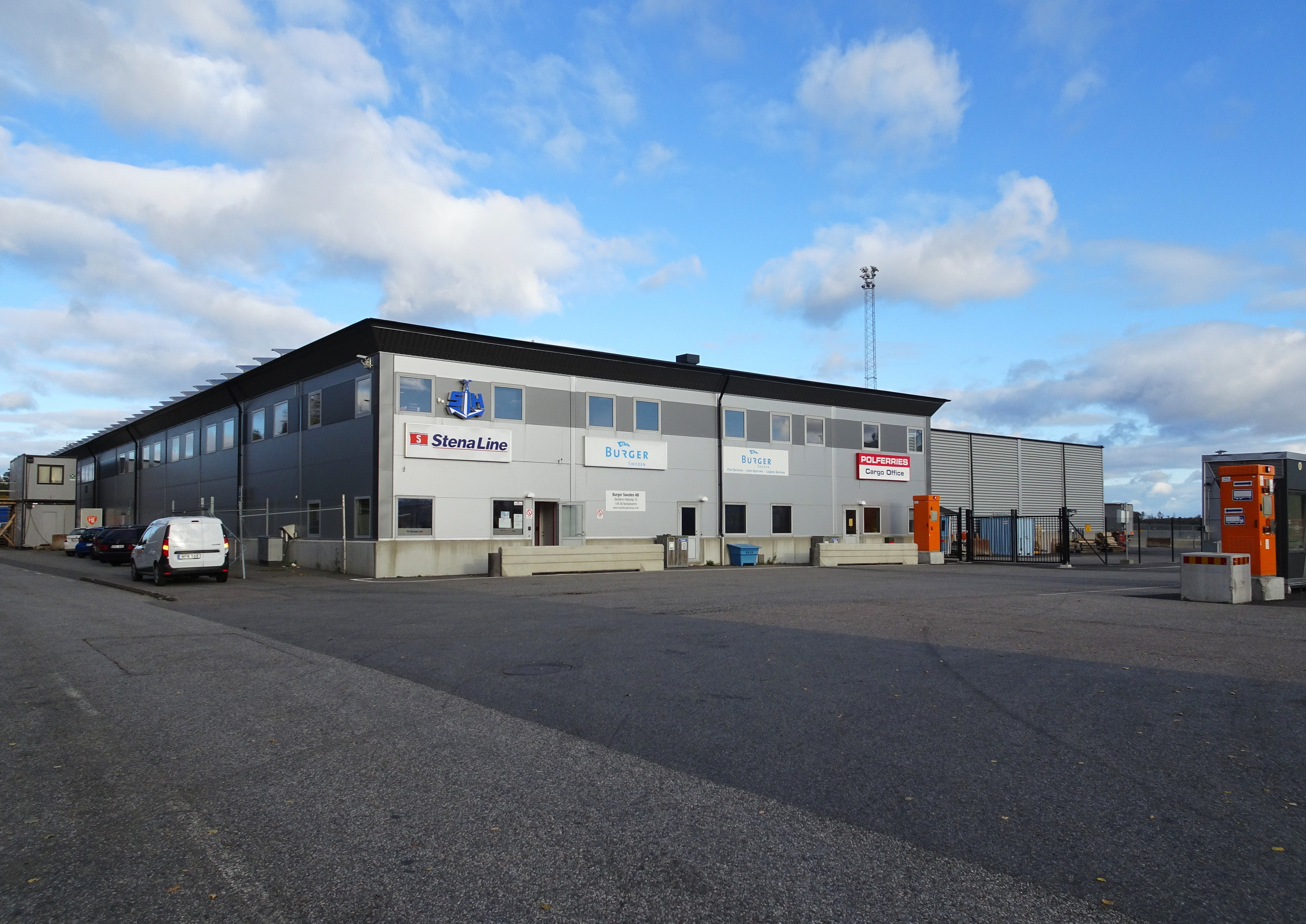
The port office of the Port of Stockholm.

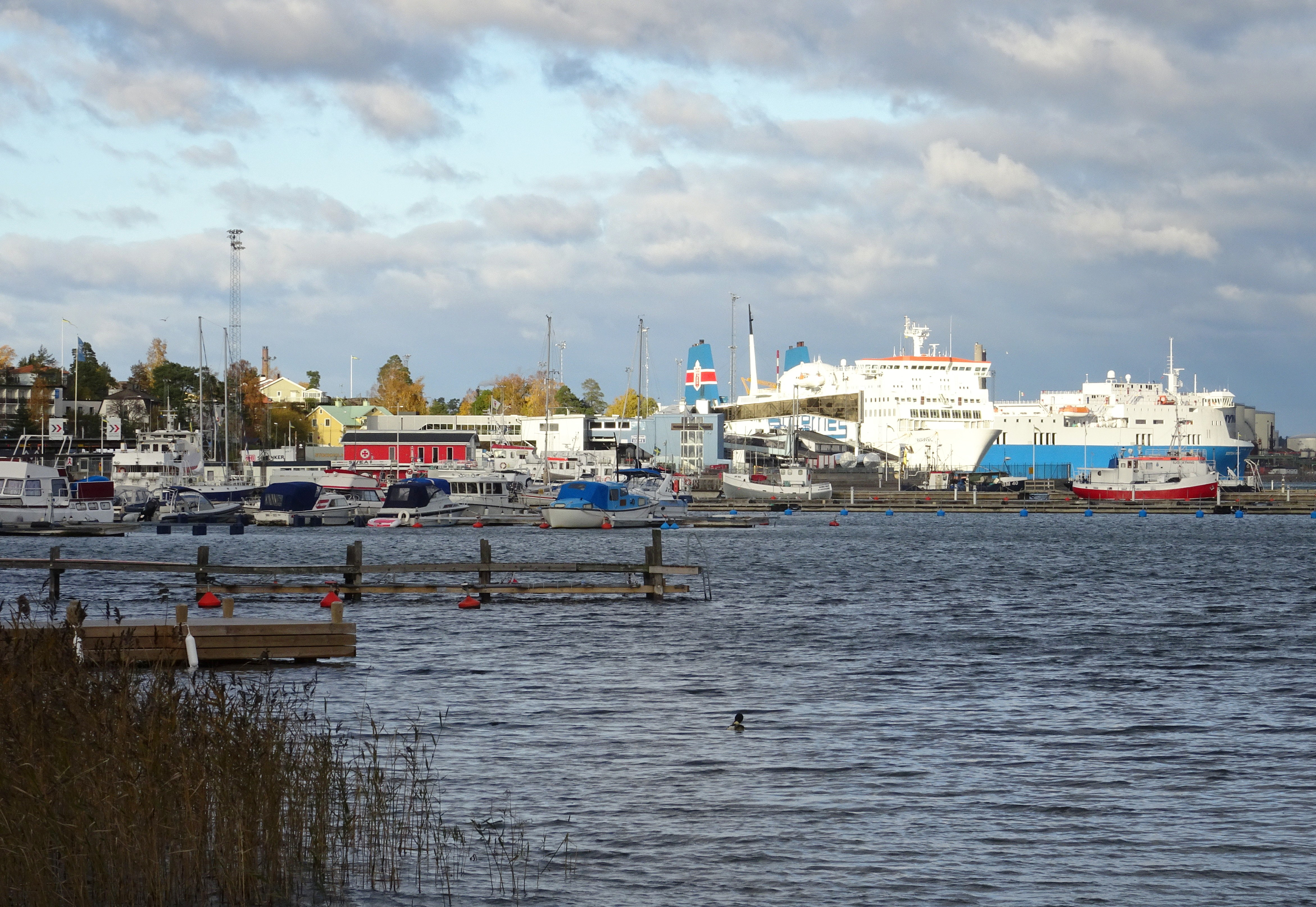
Port of Nynäshamn.

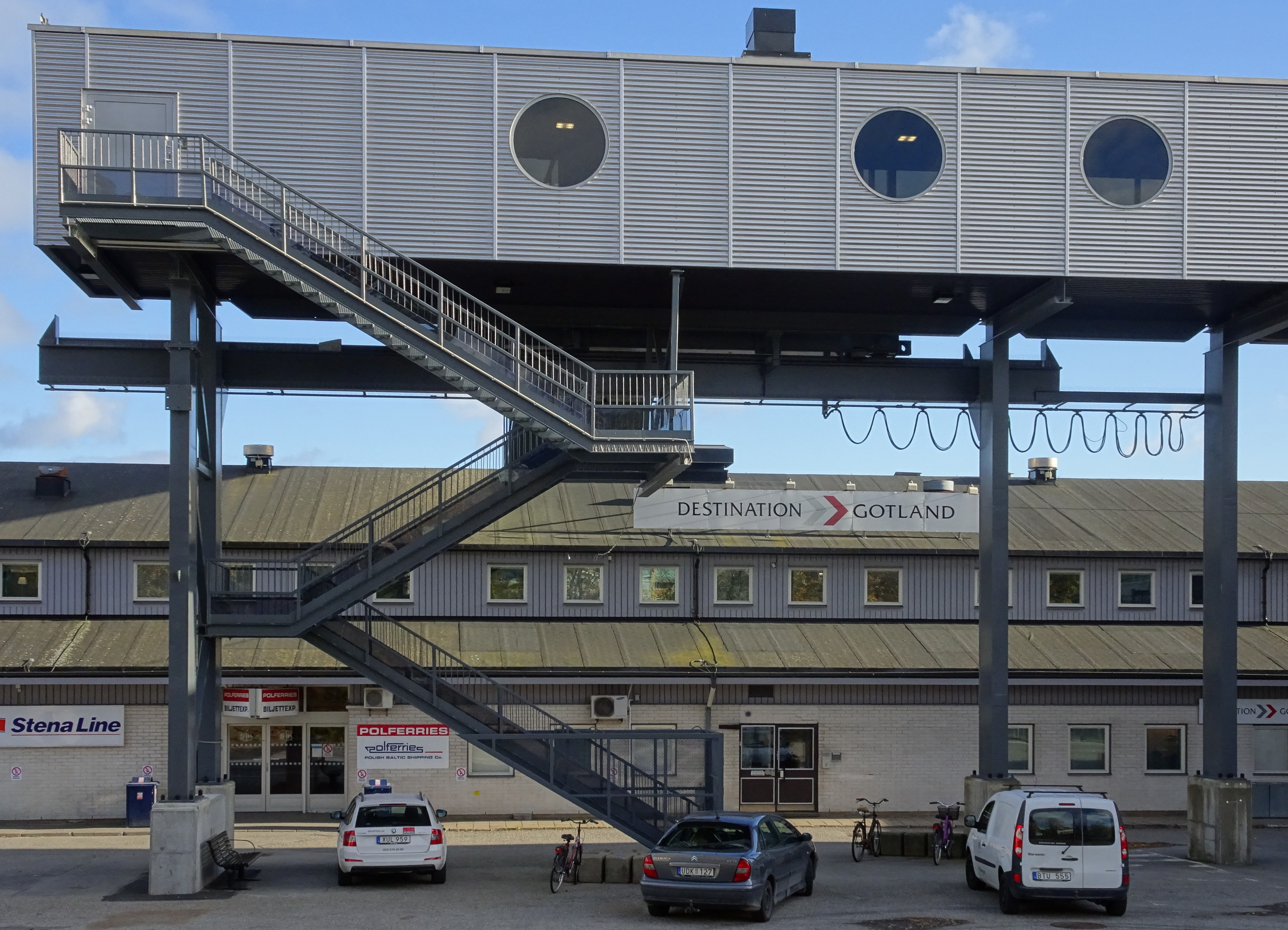
"Destination Gotlands" terminal

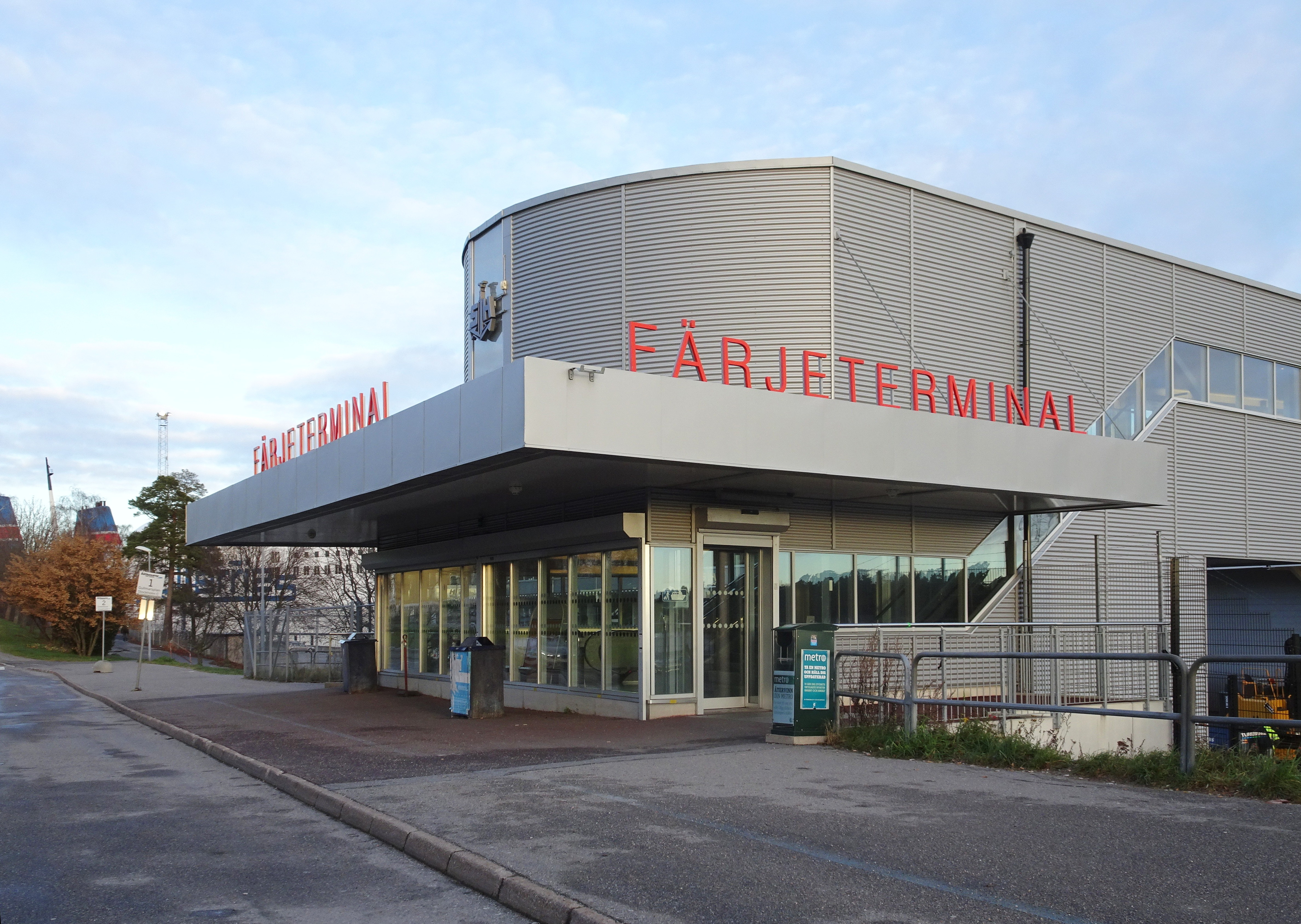
Nynäshamn ferry terminal.

== See also ==
- Ports of the Baltic Sea
