= Belfast Car Ferries =

Belfast Car Ferries Ltd
- Company type: Private
- Founded: 1982
- Defunct: 1990
- Headquarters: Belfast, Northern Ireland
- Products: Passenger transportation Freight transportation
- Parent: 1982-1987: Irish Shipping Ltd; 1987-1990: Irish Continental Group

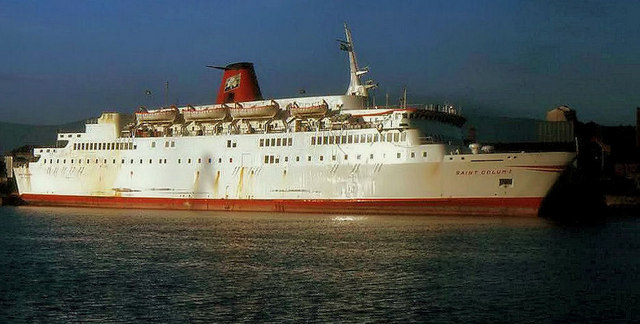
Saint Colum I at Belfast

Belfast Car Ferries was an Irish Sea ferry company that operated a passenger and freight roll-on/roll-off service between Northern Ireland and England.

== History ==
Belfast Car Ferries was formed in 1982 following P&O Ferries' withdrawal from the Liverpool–Belfast route in November 1981. Sailings commenced in May 1982 using the Saint Colum I. The vessel sailed every night from Belfast, returning during the day from Liverpool. The crossing time was 9 hours.

On 14 November 1984 the Irish Government placed parent company Irish Shipping Ltd into liquidation. In March 1987 Irish Shipping Ltd was sold to a consortium of investors and restructured as Irish Continental Group.

Belfast Car Ferries continued operations until October 1990. The Saint Colum I quickly found a new Greek owner and entered service in the Adriatic Sea.

In 1991 the Liverpool – Belfast link was reopened by Norse Irish Ferries.

== Routes ==
Belfast Car Ferries operated the following route across the Irish Sea

- Belfast (Donegall Quay) – Liverpool (Langton Dock)

== Fleet ==
During its eight years of operation the Belfast – Liverpool route was operated mainly by the Saint Colum I. Several vessels, including the Saint Patrick II, Saint Killian II and Gotland were chartered to cover for the Saint Colum I during overhaul.
