= StraitNZ =

New Zealand transport company

StraitNZ Limited
- Formerly: Strait Shipping; Bluebridge
- Industry: Passenger and freight shipping, freight forwarding and logistics
- Predecessor: Strait Shipping, Streamline Freight, Freight Lines
- Founded: 1992 (34 years ago)
- Founder: Jim Barker and Dennis Dow
- Headquarters: Wellington, New Zealand
- Area served: New Zealand
- Revenue: NZ$175 million (2021)
- Net income: NZ$45 million (2021)
- Number of employees: 500 (2021)
- Parent: Morgan Stanley Infrastructure Partners (2022–present)
- Subsidiaries: Bluebridge; StraitNZ Freight Forwarding; StraitNZ Linehaul
- Website: www.straitnz.co.nz

StraitNZ, formerly Strait Shipping, is a New Zealand transport firm that operates roll-on/roll-off freight and passenger shipping across Cook Strait between Wellington in the North Island and Picton in the South Island, and trucking and logistics services across New Zealand. Originally a freight-only service, passenger services commenced in 2002 and operate under the Bluebridge brand. As of 2021, Bluebridge holds 56% of the market for vehicle freight and 31% of the market for passenger services across Cook Strait. The company was acquired on 31 March 2022 by Morgan Stanley

== History ==
The company has its origins in Otorohanga Transport, founded by Jim Barker and Dennis Dow in 1963.

Inter-island ferry operations began in 1992 as Strait Shipping Limited, as a way for Barker to provide more affordable inter-island ferry services for his trucking group. Ferries between the North and South Islands of New Zealand were then monopolised by the Interisland Line, owned by the then state-owned enterprise New Zealand Rail (privatised in 1993 and renamed Tranz Rail in 1995). As of 2022, the two companies still hold a duopoly on interisland ferry services.

As well as operating across the Cook Strait between Wellington and Picton, Strait Shipping has in the past also operated freight shipping between Wellington and Napier, also in the North Island, and Nelson and Lyttelton in the South Island.

Bluebridge was launched as the passenger service brand of Strait Shipping in 2003.

In 2016, Strait Shipping was sold to Australian-based Champ Private Equity Group. At the same time, Champ Group also purchased trucking companies Freight Lines and Streamline Freight, which had both been separately owned by the Barker family. At the time, the trucking and ferry companies owned by the Barker family were estimated to employ around 750 people.

On 29 March 2018 Strait Shipping Limited was renamed StraitNZ, with passenger services continuing to operate under the Bluebridge brand. Sister companies Freight Lines and Streamline were rebranded as "StraitNZ Linehaul" and "StraitNZ Freight Forwarding" respectively. That year, a 25% stake in the company was acquired by Macquarie.

In December 2021, the StraitNZ Group was sold by Champ Private Equity and Macquarie to Morgan Stanley Infrastructure Partners, for a reported sale price of NZ$500 million. The acquisition was completed in March 2022.

As of 2021, StraitNZ’s Bluebridge ferry unit was reported to have a 56% market share for Cook Strait vehicle freight, and a 31% market share for passenger services. The remaining share is held by Interislander, a subsidiary of New Zealand Government-owned KiwiRail.

== Fleet ==
=== Current ===
Name	Image	Shipyard	Launched	Entered service	Port of registry	Tonnage	Notes
Connemara		Cantiere Navale Visentini, Porto Viro, Italy	2007	2023	(The Bahamas) Nassau, Bahamas	27,414 GT	
Livia		Cantiere Navale Visentini, Porto Viro, Italy	2008	2025	(The Bahamas) Nassau, Bahamas	26,904 GT	

=== Past ===
Name	Image	Shipyard	Launched	Entered service	Retired	Tonnage	Notes
Straitsman (1972)		NQEA, Cairns, Australia	1972	1992	2004	1,481 GT	Strait Shipping's first vessel. It transported livestock and launched Strait Shipping's service across Cook Strait between Wellington, Picton and Nelson. In service until replaced by Santa Regina in 2002.
Suilven		Moss Verft, Moss, Norway	1974	1995	2004	3,638 GT	
Kent		Ishikawajima-Harima Shipyard, Tokyo, Japan	1977	2001	2010	6,862 GT	
Santa Regina		Ateliers et Chantiers du Havre, Le Havre, France	1985	2002	2015	14,588 GT	
Monte Stello		Ateliers et Chantiers du Havre, Le Havre, France	1979	2006	2010	11,630 GT	Lost power in Tory Channel on 2 May 2008.
Straitsman (2005)		Volharding Shipyards, Netherlands	2005	2010	2023	13,906 GT	Now operated by Condor Ferries in the United Kingdom
Strait Feronia		Cantiere Navale Visentini, Porto Viro, Italy	1997	2015	2025	21,856 GT	Replaced by Livia; sold to Egypt in September 2025 for Red Sea service as Pan Lily.
