= MV Connemara =

Roll-on/roll-off passenger and freight ferry

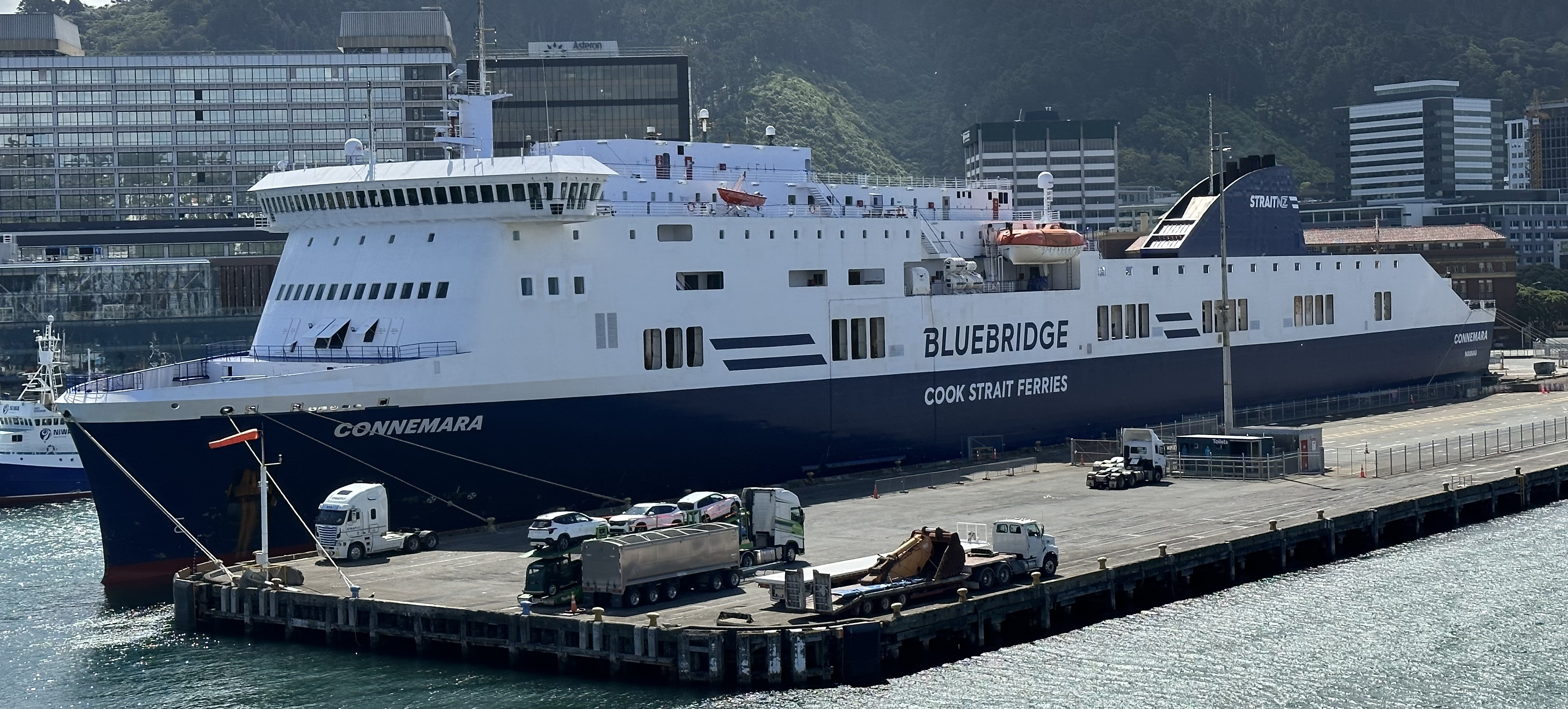
- Connemara in February 2023

History
- Name: Borja (2007–2010); Baltic Amber (2010–2011); Norman Asturias (2011–2016); Asterion (2016–2018); Connemara (2018–present)
- Namesake: Connemara
- Owner: Visemar Trasporti Srl (2006–2007); Stena RORO (2007–2022); Ferry Lines Singapore (from 2022)
- Operator: Balearia (2007–2010); AVE Lines (2010); DFDS Seaways (2010–2011); LD Lines (2011–2014); Inter Shipping (2014–2015); ANEK Lines (2016–2018); Brittany Ferries (2018–2022); StraitNZ Bluebridge (from 2023)
- Port of registry: Bari, Italy (2007–2014); Frederikshavn, Denmark (2014–2016); Piraeus, Greece (2016–2018); Limassol, Cyprus (2018); Morlaix, France (2018–2020); Limassol, Cyprus (2020–2022); Nassau, Bahamas (2022–present)
- Builder: Cantiere Navale Visentini
- Yard number: 216
- Launched: 18 December 2006
- Maiden voyage: 20 May 2007
- Identification: IMO number: 9349760
- Status: in service

Connemara is a RORO passenger and freight ferry currently sailing across the Cook Strait in New Zealand on StraitNZ's Bluebridge service, after being purchased from Stena RoRo. From 2007 to 2010, she was operated by Balearia as Borja, then between 2010 and 2011 as Baltic Amber for AVE Lines and then DFDS Seaways, before subsequently spending four years on charter to LD Lines. She spent the majority of autumn 2014 and 2015 on charter to Inter Shipping sailing from Algeciras, Spain, when she was then chartered by ANEK Lines, being replaced by Nova Star Cruises's Nova Star. The ship was renamed Asterion which comes from Greek Mythology of Asterion, the King of Crete.

Connemara is named after a region in the province of Connacht in western Ireland, facing the Atlantic Ocean.

== History ==
=== Borja ===
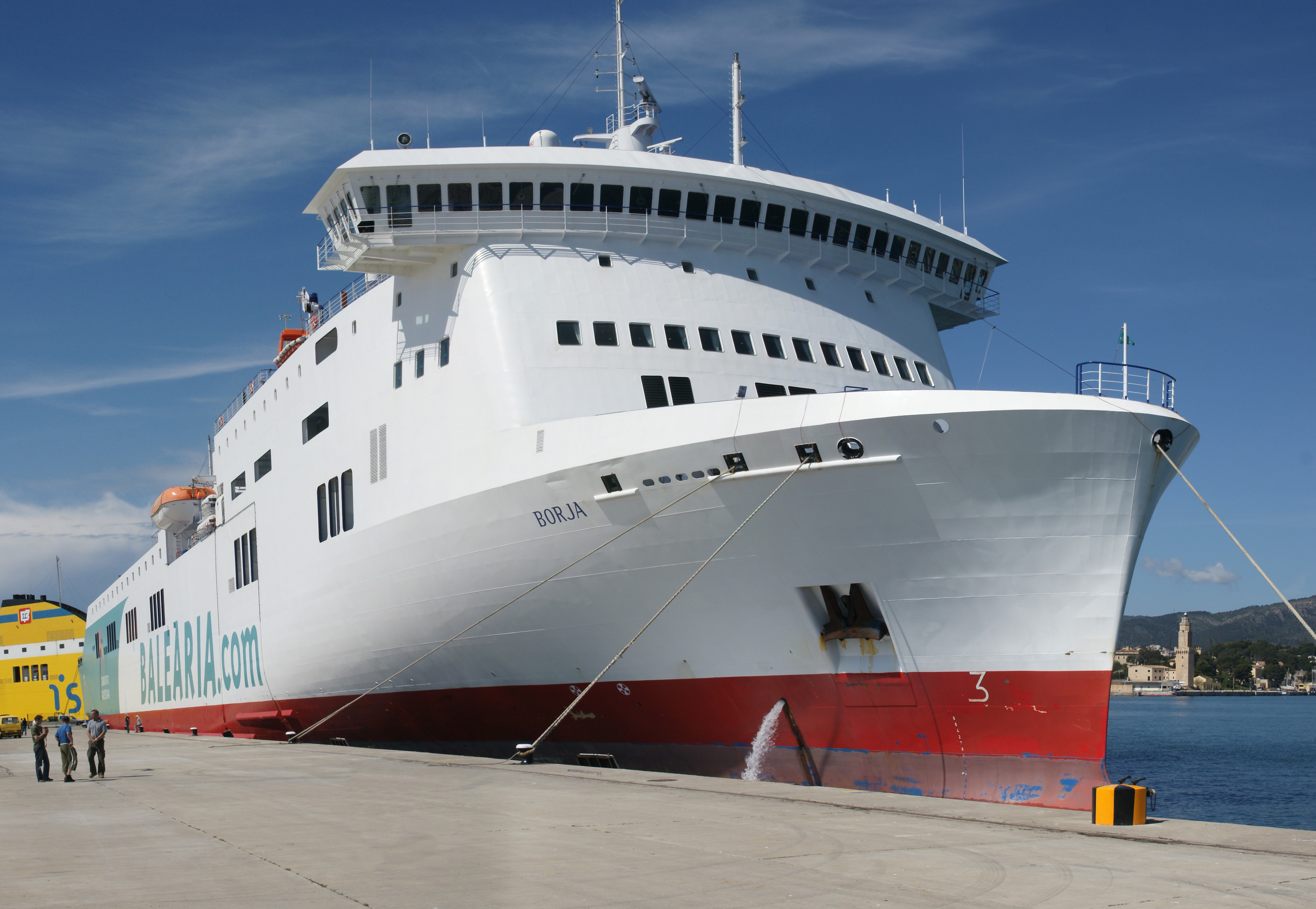
Borja operated by Balearia

Connemara was launched on 18 December 2006 as Borja and was completed on 11 May 2007. She was chartered to Stena Line during construction and was thought to be called Stena Ausonia but this did not happen and instead Stena chartered her to Balearia for services in Spain, she started operating between Barcelona and Palma on 20 May 2007. In June that same year she was sold to Stena RORO, London.

=== Baltic Amber ===
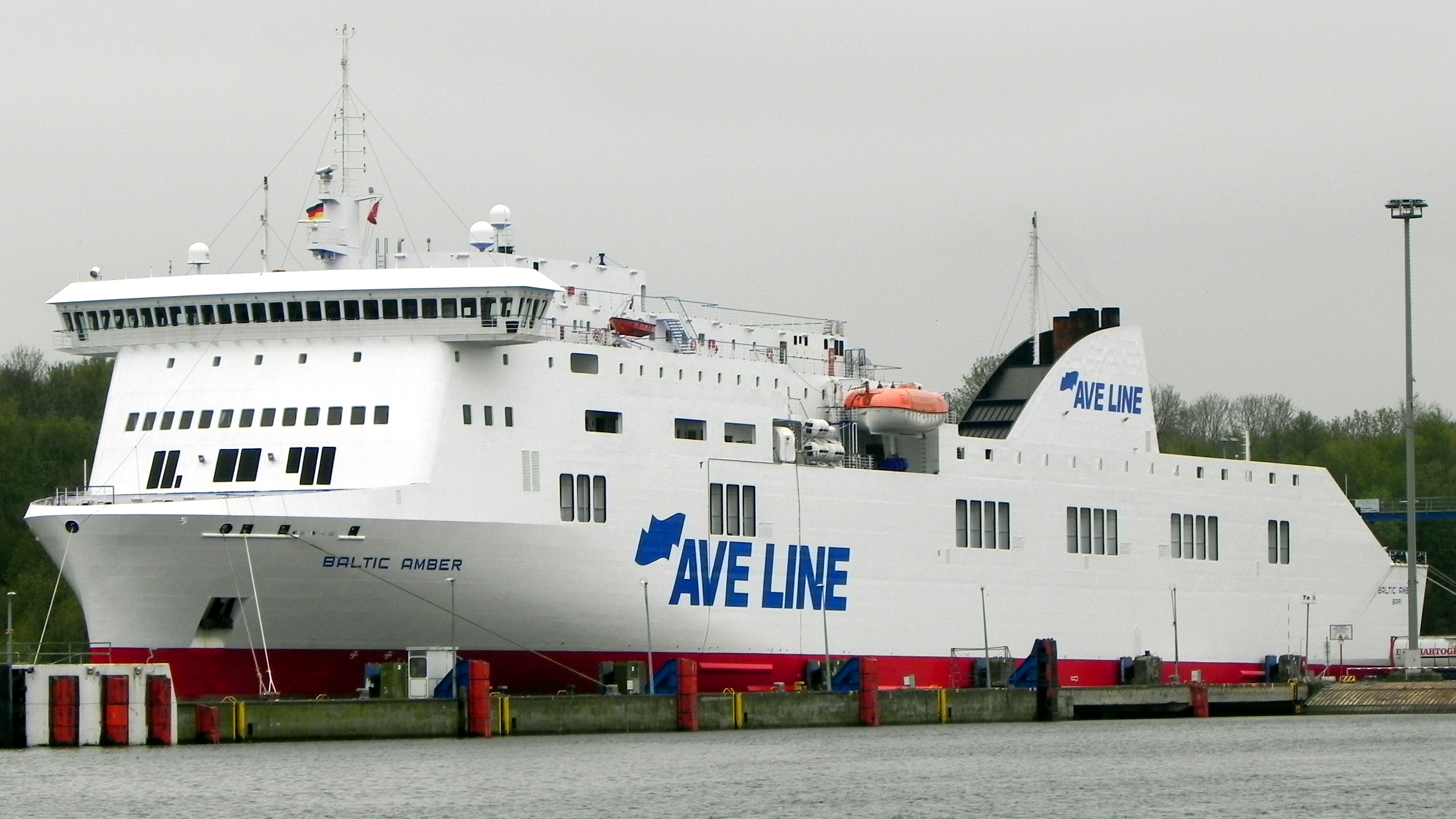
Baltic Amber in 2010 operated by AVE Lines

In 2010 she ended her charter to Balearia and was sent to Rotterdam where that same year she was chartered to AVE Lines and renamed Baltic Amber, operating between Travemünde and Ventspils, and later that month from Travemünde to Riga. In October 2010 she was chartered to DFDS Seaways for service between Klaipėda and Kiel.

=== Norman Asturias ===
In 2011 she was chartered to LD Lines for service between Marseille and Tunis, but soon after moved to a new Saint-Nazaire–Gijón "Motorway of the Sea" route, replacing Norman Trader. She was renamed Norman Asturias in June 2011 and she remained on same route until November 2013 when she was transferred to LD Lines' new Poole–Santander service. From 3 February 2014 the ferry also commenced a weekly service from Poole to Gijón, although the first scheduled sailing from Gijón was cancelled because of severe weather. She has a capacity for 518 passengers, 120 freight vehicles and 195 cars.

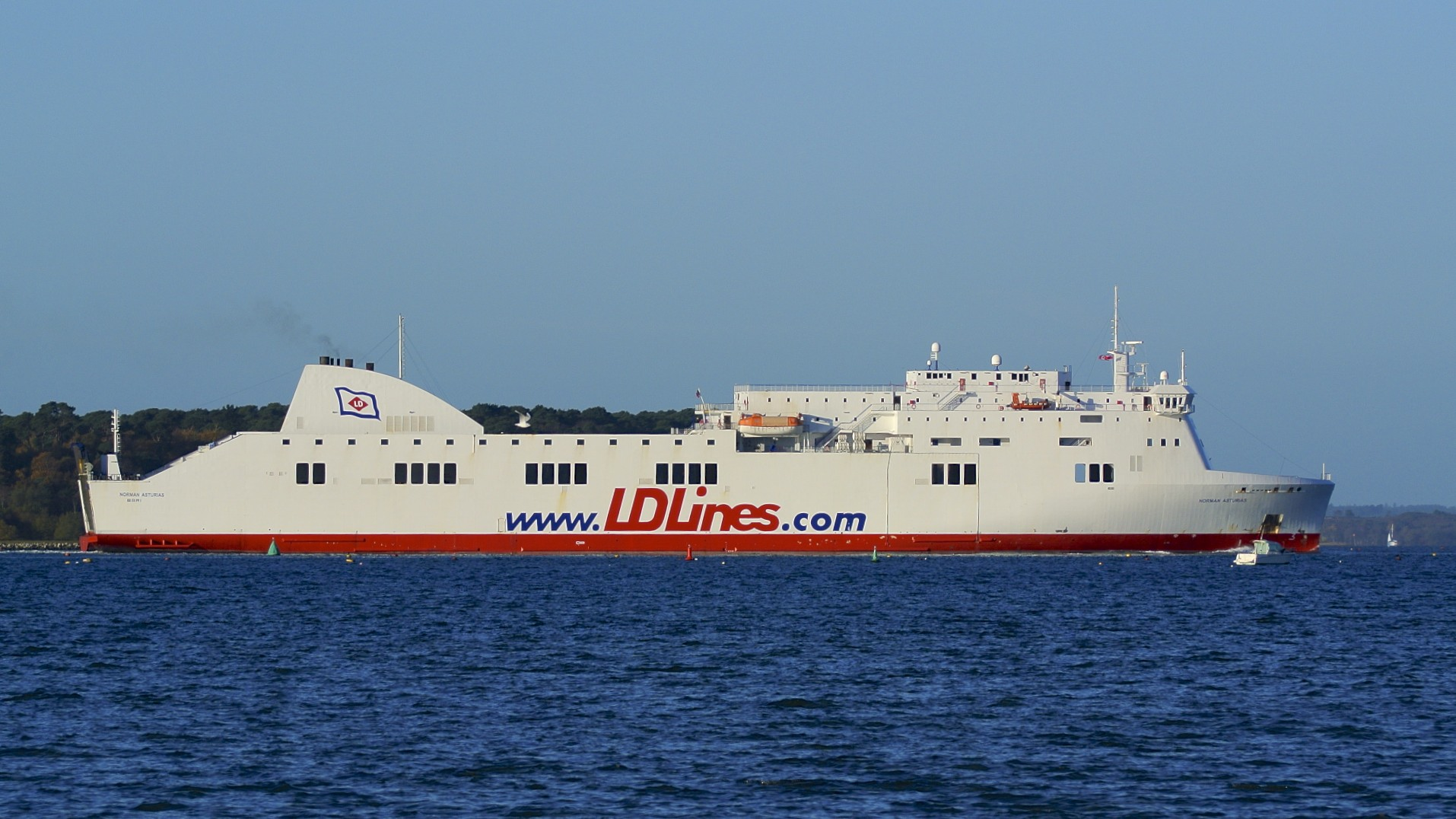
Norman Asturias in 2013 operated by LD Lines

When LD Lines carried out a business review in late August 2014 which included the closure of their two Spanish routes from Poole, Norman Asturias finished her final sailing in early September and was then laid up of Saint Nazaire. Stena RoRo then chartered her to Inter Shipping who run services between Tangier Med, Morocco and Algeciras, Spain where she then replaced the Stena Feronia which was on charter to Inter at the same time, Stena Feronia then later left for anchoring off Gibraltar and she was then place on the Birkenhead-Belfast route to cover the Stena Lagan refit. She left France at the same time as the Norman Atlantic which was then chartered to Caronte and Tourist, later Anek-Superfast. Norman Asturias started service between Spain and Morocco for Inter in October 2014 after her LD Lines livery was removed and she was then later transferred from the Italian to the Danish Flag in December 2014.

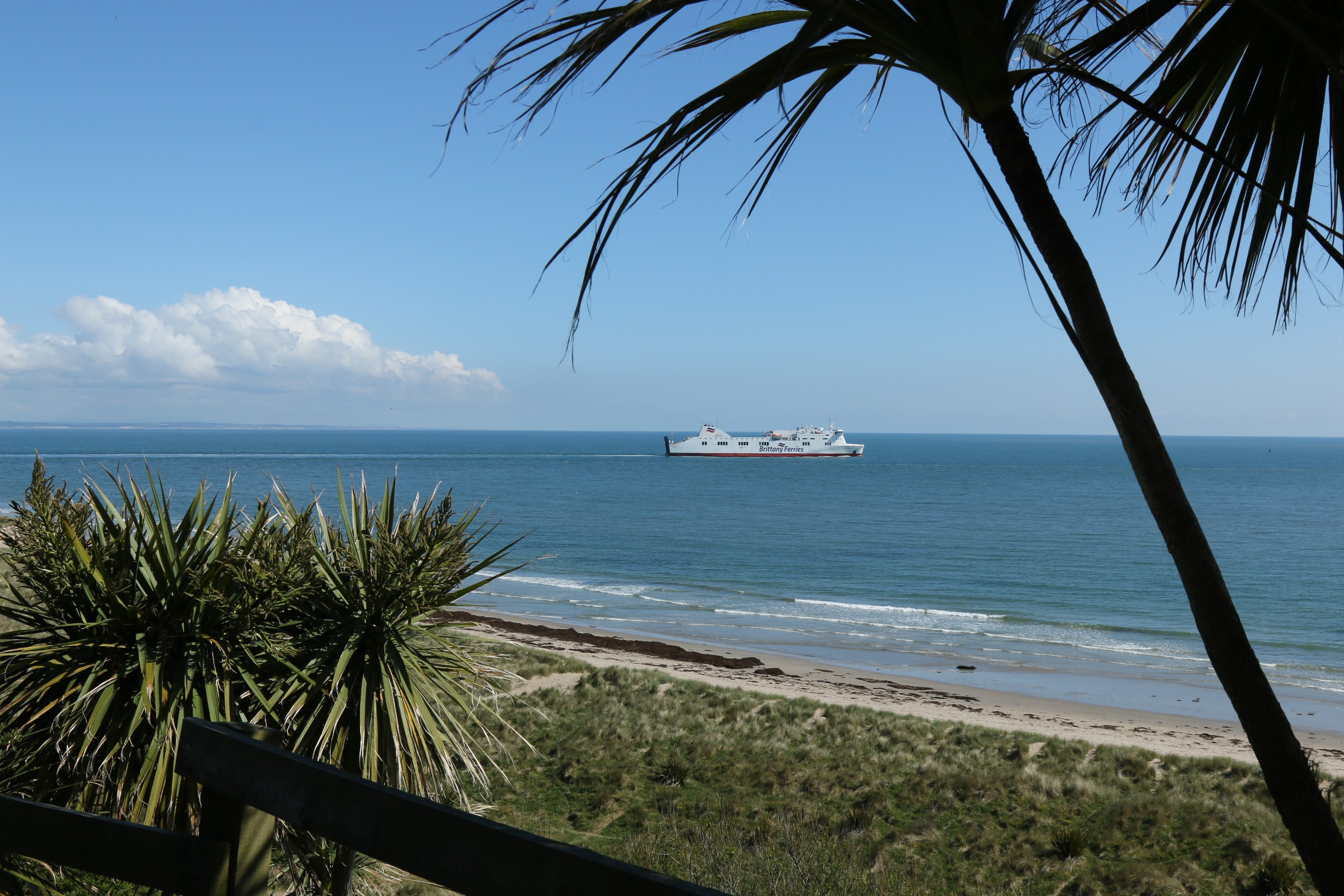
Connemara with Brittany Ferries

On 16 January 2018, Brittany Ferries announced it would charter Norman Asturias for a new twice-weekly route starting on 6 May 2018 between Cork, Ireland and Santander, along with an additional route between Cork and Roscoff, France with the name Connemara. The line described the ship as "no-frills" with basic onboard service.

=== Connemara ===
Connemara was sold to StraitNZ in December 2022 to replace the Straitsman. On 29 January 2023 Connemara arrived in Wellington, New Zealand to begin her "Bluebridge" inter-island service across the Cook Strait to Picton for StraitNZ. She will replace Strait Feronia, which will shift to Straitsman's schedule. Her pet-friendly cabins are a first for StraitNZ. On 31 August 2024, she was taken off the Cook Strait run for her night cabins to be converted into a premium lounge. In September 2024, it was announced the new lounge would be named the Pohutukawa Lounge, and bookings accepted for sailings after 1 December 2024

On 19 September 2024, Connemara lost power at 10:30pm about 3.7 km off Sinclair Head while crossing the Cook Strait after leaving Wellington. The ferry was carrying 88 people at the time of the power outage. The tug boat Tapuhi towed it back to Wellington while a second tug Tiaki provided steerage in the early hours of 20 September. Regulatory body Maritime New Zealand launched an investigation into the power outage.

On 8 October 2024, the Connemara hit a wharf in Picton while berthing under strong winds. She lost power again in Wellington Harbour on 11 October 2024. At the time, the Connemara was carrying between 435 and 450 people and was traveling from Picton to Wellington. The ferry dropped anchor near the Miramar Peninsula. While the ferry had called a tug boat, the ship crew had managed to resolve the engine issue before the boat was dispatched.

On 8 January 2026, the Connemara was forced to return to Wellington after a fault was discovered with its ramp. 200 passengers were stranded and had to spend the night in Wellington while specialist crane operators worked to lower the ramp.

In mid-March 2026, a technical fault aboard the Connemara led to the cancellation of ferry services on 12 and 13 March, disrupting travel across the Cook Strait.
