= Cantiere Navale Visentini =

Italian shipbuilder

- Industry: Shipbuilding
- Founded: 1964
- Headquarters: Donada, Italy

Cantiere Navale di Visentini is a family owned Italian shipbuilder, based in Donada near Venice. The company is largest private shipbuilder in Italy.

== Deliveries ==
Hull	Built	Type	Current Name	Operator	Image	Notes	IMO
	1964	Cargo	Sottomarina	Tiozzo Mare			6407470
58	1970	Cargo	Archon	Alpha Petrelefsis Vi Maritime			7012480
	1972	Tanker	Santa Giulia	PETROLMAR SPA			8830669
	1974	Tug	Comet	Rich Marine Services			
	1972/1974	Tug	RP 101-class tugboat	Italian Navy			
	1975	Tug	Atlante (A5317)	Italian Navy		Decommissioned in 2004	
	1975	Tug	Prometeo (A5318)	Italian Navy			
	1976	Crane Barge	Fortore	Impresa Cidonio S.P.A.			8959037
102	1976	Cargo	Naxos Express	Lester Shipping SA			7432836
103	1977	Cargo	Beton Leader	Levra NV			7432848
	1977	Container Ship	Alexander	De Jesus Shipping			7432850
	1978	Cargo	Karamara	Emirates Coasts Shipping			7533745
139	1981	RoRo	Shaker 1	Hashim Omer Wadineel Group Sharjah			7929102
144	1981	RoRo	Nasser	Baja Ferries			7929114
149	1984	Roro	Shaker 2	Hashim Omer, Wadineel Group Sharjah			8223244
	1987	RoRo	Cap Camarat	Cma Cgm			8420426
157	1989	RoRo	Robur	Tualo Shipping			8716954
158	1990	RoRo	Maior	Levantina Trasporti			8716966
161	1991	RoRo	Seaboard Sun	Seaboard Marine			9014030
162	1992	RoRo	Altinia	Levantina Trasporti	ALTINIA		9048471
	1993	Cruise ship	Silver Cloud (hull only)	Silversea Cruises	"Silver Cloud"		8903923
	1993	Cruise ship	Silver Wind (hull only)	Silversea Cruises	"Silver Wind"		8903935
163	1994	RoRo/RoPax	AF Marina	Adria Ferries	AF Marina in Bari		9059107
164	1995	RoRo	Cenk G	Cenk Shipping	"Cenk G" as "Euroferry Malta" with Grimaldi		9108556
167	1995	RoRo	Eurocargo Napoli	Grimaldi	"Eurocargo Napoli"		9108568
170	1996	RoRo	Mont Ventoux	CMA CGM	"Mont Ventoux"		9129586
179	1996	RoRo	Ark Futura	DFDS Seaways	"Ark Futura"		9129598
183	1998	RoRo	Eurocargo Salerno	Grimaldi	"Eurocargo Salerno"		9175494
184	1998	RoRo	Eurocargo Istanbul	Grimaldi			9165310
186	1999	RoRo	Eurocargo Valencia	Grimaldi			9192959
226	2014	RoRo	Wedellsborg	Grendi Trasporti Marittimi	Wedellsborg		9687306
231	2016	RoRo	Stena Forwarder	Stena Line	Stena Forwarder as the Frijsenborg		9645396

== Ferries ==
=== Generation 1 / Other ===
Hull	Built	Type	Current Name	Operator	Image	Notes
	1974	Ferry	Sara D	Delcomar		
135	1978	Double ended ferry	Ulisse	Meridiano Lines S.p.A.		
	1979	Double ended ferry	Bridge	Navigazione Generale Italiana		
141	1981	Double ended ferry	Villa San Giovanni	Caronte & Tourist	Villa San Giovanni	
150	1984	Double ended ferry	Giano	Caronte & Tourist		
	1987	Double ended ferry	Stretto Messina	Caronte & Tourist		
156	1988	Double ended ferry	Archimede	Caronte & Tourist		
165	1993	Double ended ferry	Giuseppe Franza	Caronte & Tourist		
166	1993	Double ended ferry	Zancle	Caronte & Tourist	Zancle crossing the Strait of Messina	
189	1998	Ferry	Metamauco	Actv	Metamauco at Venice	
190	1998	Ferry	S.Nicolò	Actv		

=== Generation 2 ===
Hull	Built	Type	Current Name	Operator	Image	Notes
185	1999	Ropax	Optima Seaways	DFDS Seaways	Optima Seaways as Lisco Optima in 2007	

=== Generation 3 ===
Hull	Built	Type	Current Name	Operator	Image	Notes
180	1997	Ropax	Pan Lily	Pan Marine Shipping	Strait Feronia	
182	1997	Ropax	Pelagos Express	UME Shipping	The Pelagos in Marseille	

=== Generation 4 ===
Hull	Built	Type	Current Name	Operator	Image	Notes
193	2002	Ropax	Nápoles	Baleària	Nápoles as Partenope with TTTLines in 2012	
194	2002	Ropax	Sicília	Baleària	Sicília as Trinacia at Catania in 2012	
195	2001	RoPax	AF Claudia	Adria Ferries	AF Claudia as California Star	
196	2001	Ropax	Kerry	Baleària	Kerry	
197	2003	Ropax	Sorrento	-	Sorrento	Destroyed by fire - scrapped
200	2003	RoPax	Catania	Grimaldi		
209	2004	Ropax	Florencia	Grimaldi	Florencia with TTTLines in 2017	
210	2004	Ropax	Venezia	Grimaldi	The Grimaldi ferry "Venezia" in the port of Brindisi, October 2020	
216	2007	Ropax	Connemara	StraitNZ|Bluebridge Cook Strait Ferries	Connemara	
214	2006	RoPax	Stena Horizon	Stena Line	Stena Horizon	
215	2006	RoPax	Corfù	Grimaldi Lines	Corfù in Brindisi, July 2020	
218	2007	Ropax	Ciudad de Palma	Transmed	Ciudad de Palma of Trasmediterránea in the port of Palma de Mallorca	
219	2008	Ropax	Stena Flavia	Stena Line	Stena Flavia in the western Baltic Sea	
220	2008	RoPax	Livia	StraitNZ|Bluebridge Cook Strait Ferries	Stena Livia - Stena Line	
221	2009	RoPax	GNV Sealand	Grandi Navi Veloci	GNV Sealand as Scottish Viking in July 2013	
222	2009	RoPax	Norman Atlantic	-	Norman Atlantic in Bari	Destroyed by fire - scrapped
223	2010	RoPax	Hedy Lamarr	Baleària	Hedy Lamarr in Palma de Mallorca	
227	2010	RoPax	Cartour Delta	Caronte & Tourist	Cartour Delta in Salerno	

=== Generation 4+ ===
Hull	Built	Type	Current Name	Operator	Image	Notes
228	2011	Ropax	Epsilon	Unity Line | Olive Ferries	Epsilon	
212	2005	Ropax	Stena Scandica	Stena Line	Stena Scandica (formerly Stena Lagan) in 2023	
213	2005	Ropax	Stena Baltica	Stena Line	Stena Baltica as Stena Mersey in 2012	

=== Generation 5 ===
Hull	Built	Type	Current Name	Operator	Image	Notes
224	2019	Ropax	Hypatia de Alejandria	Baleària		
225	2019	RoPax	Marie Curie	Baleària		

=== Generation 6 ===
Hull	Built	Type	Current Name	Operator	Image	Notes
229	2020	RoPax	Ciudad de Valencia	Trasmediterránea	Ciudad de Valencia	
230	2021	RoPax	GNV Bridge	Grandi Navi Veloci	GNV Bridge in the port of Genoa in 2021	

=== Generation 7 ===
Hull	Built	Type	Current Name	Operator	Image	Notes
238	2022	RoPax	A Galeotta	Corsica Linea	A Galeotta in the port of Bastia in 2023	
237	2024	RoPax	Varsovia	Polferries	Varsovia in 2024	
