= Nova Star Cruises =

- Company type: Private Company
- Industry: Transportation
- Founded: 2014
- Key people: Mark Amundsen, President & CEO
- Products: Ferry service

Nova Star Cruises Limited, referred to simply as Nova Star Cruises, was a ferry company operating in Nova Scotia and Maine. Their ship, MV Nova Star, was a Ropax cruiseferry operating seasonally on the Gulf of Maine between Portland, Maine and Yarmouth, Nova Scotia.

The company, operated as a joint venture by Quest Navigation of Eliot, Maine and Singapore conglomerate ST Marine, was awarded the contract to operate the route in November 2013, when the Nova Scotia government agreed to issue $21 million in forgivable loans to the company over seven years. The company began service on May 15, 2014. During the first summer, the company expected to carry 100,000 passengers, but had only carried 59,000 by the time it stopped operating for the season in October. As a result, the Nova Scotia government spent the entire $21 million allocated to subsidizing the service for seven years in the first season, and issued an additional $4.4 million to Nova Star in October, subject to increased financial oversight.

Nova Star was initially laid up for winter 2015 in Nova Scotia, but moved south to Charleston, South Carolina in January after Nova Scotia provided $2 million to cover off-season expenses. In February, Nova Scotia officials said that the province had developed a plan to spend $13 million to subsidize Nova Star during the 2015 season, with the ferry operating between June 1 and October 14.

During 2015, the company set a target of 80,000 passengers carried, though by August it was on track to miss the goal, having carried 37,800 by the end of the month, and the Nova Scotia government was working to determine whether it would contract with Nova Star again in 2016. Four companies submitted bids to Nova Scotia, with the province expected to select the 2016 operator of the route within weeks.

By 2016 the MV Nova Star had moved to Europe and a new high-speed ferry line was in operation between Portland and Yarmouth.
