= Pan Lily =

Cook Strait ferry

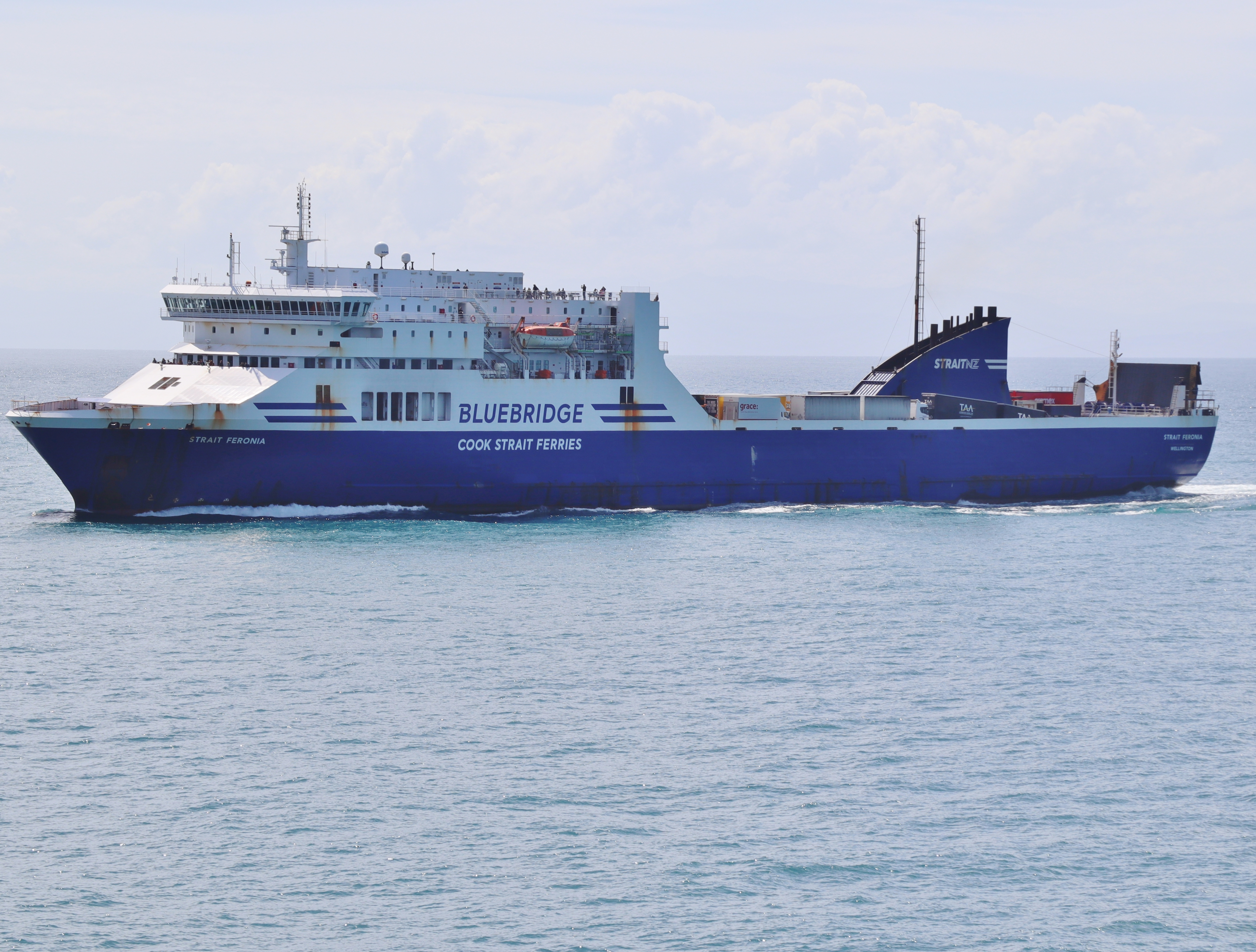
- Strait Feronia in the Cook Strait

History
- Name: Strait Feronia
- Owner: StraitNZ
- Operator: StraitNZ
- Port of registry: (New Zealand); Wellington
- Route: Wellington to Picton
- Builder: Cantiere Navale Visentini, Italy
- Launched: 7 December 1996
- Completed: 1997
- Identification: IMO number: 9136022; MMSI number: 512263000; Callsign: ZMSF
- Status: In service

General characteristics
- Tonnage: 21,856 GT
- Length: 186.0 m (610 ft 3 in)
- Beam: 25.60 m (84 ft 0 in)
- Draught: 5.55 m (18 ft 3 in)
- Installed power: 2 x Wärtsilä 8R46 diesel engines
- Propulsion: 2 × controllable pitch propellers; 2 × bow thrusters
- Speed: 21.5 knots (40 km/h)
- Capacity: 370 passengers; 2,150 lane meters

Pan Lily is a ROPAX ferry owned and operated by Pan Marine Shipping. The vessel was initially named Mersey Viking and saw service in the Irish Sea, eventually being renamed Dublin Viking and then Dublin Seaways. She was later acquired by the Stena Line and renamed Stena Feronia and saw service between Tangier and Algericas and later between Kiel and Gothenburg. From 2015 until 2025 she operated on StraitNZ's inter-island service in New Zealand as Strait Feronia, until she was sold to Pan Marine Shipping as Pan Lily.

== History ==
Strait Feronia was launched on 7 December 1996 as Mersey Viking for the Irish Sea ferry operator Norse Irish Ferries. The ship was built by Cantiere Navale Visentini in Italy. The ship entered service in July 1997 operating between Liverpool and Belfast. She remained on this route until December 2005 when she moved to the Birkenhead–Dublin route. Prior to transferring to the Dublin route the ship was renamed Dublin Viking. On 7 August 2007 a mooring rope at the ship's stern parted whilst preparing to depart Dublin. Two people were injured by the parting rope, a member of the ship's crew later dying of his injuries. In August 2010 the vessel was renamed Dublin Seaways following DFDS's acquisition of Norfolkline.

In January 2011 DFDS Seaways closed the Birkenhead–Dublin route; Dublin Seaways was sold to Stena Line and renamed Stena Feronia. On 7 March 2012 Stena Feronia collided with the cargo ship Union Moon just before entering the fairway of Belfast Lough. Stena Feronia was holed above the waterline but was able to berth safely in Belfast. In 2012, she was chartered to the Moroccan ferry operator Inter Shipping for service between Tangier and Algeciras. She sailed successfully for two years on that route before she was replaced in October 2014 by the LD Lines vessel, Norman Asturias which had been chartered to Inter Shipping. Stena Feronia then left that service and was anchored off the coast of Gibraltar for a short while before returning to Belfast. She was laid up in Belfast before substituting for Stena Mersey while she was in dry dock at both Belfast and Falmouth. After a brief lay-up in Belfast and in Sweden, from 26 January 2015 she operated between Kiel and Gothenburg for eight weeks as a temporary replacement while Stena Germanica underwent a refit.

In early 2015 StraitNZ, of Wellington New Zealand purchased Stena Feronia and renamed her Strait Feronia for its Bluebridge Wellington to Picton service across the Cook Strait. She was delivered in June 2015 after a 45-day sailing from Sweden.

In September 2025, Strait Feronia was replaced by Livia. It was sold to Egyptian company Pan Marine Shipping and renamed Pan Lily for intended service in the Red Sea under the Panamanian flag.

== Sister ships ==
Strait Feronia was the first of two identical ships built by Cantiere Navale Visentini for Norse Irish Ferries. The second ship was launched as Lagan Viking and has been operating between Marseille and Tanger Med for La Méridionale as Pelagos since 2019 up to 2025. She was then sold to UME Shipping for service in Egypt and Saudi Arabia under the name Pelagos Express

== Gallery ==
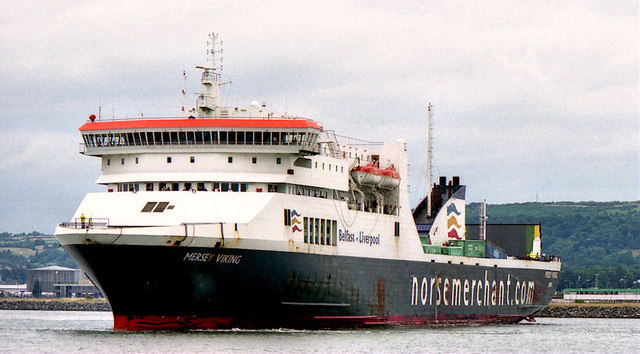
Mersey Viking arriving in Belfast

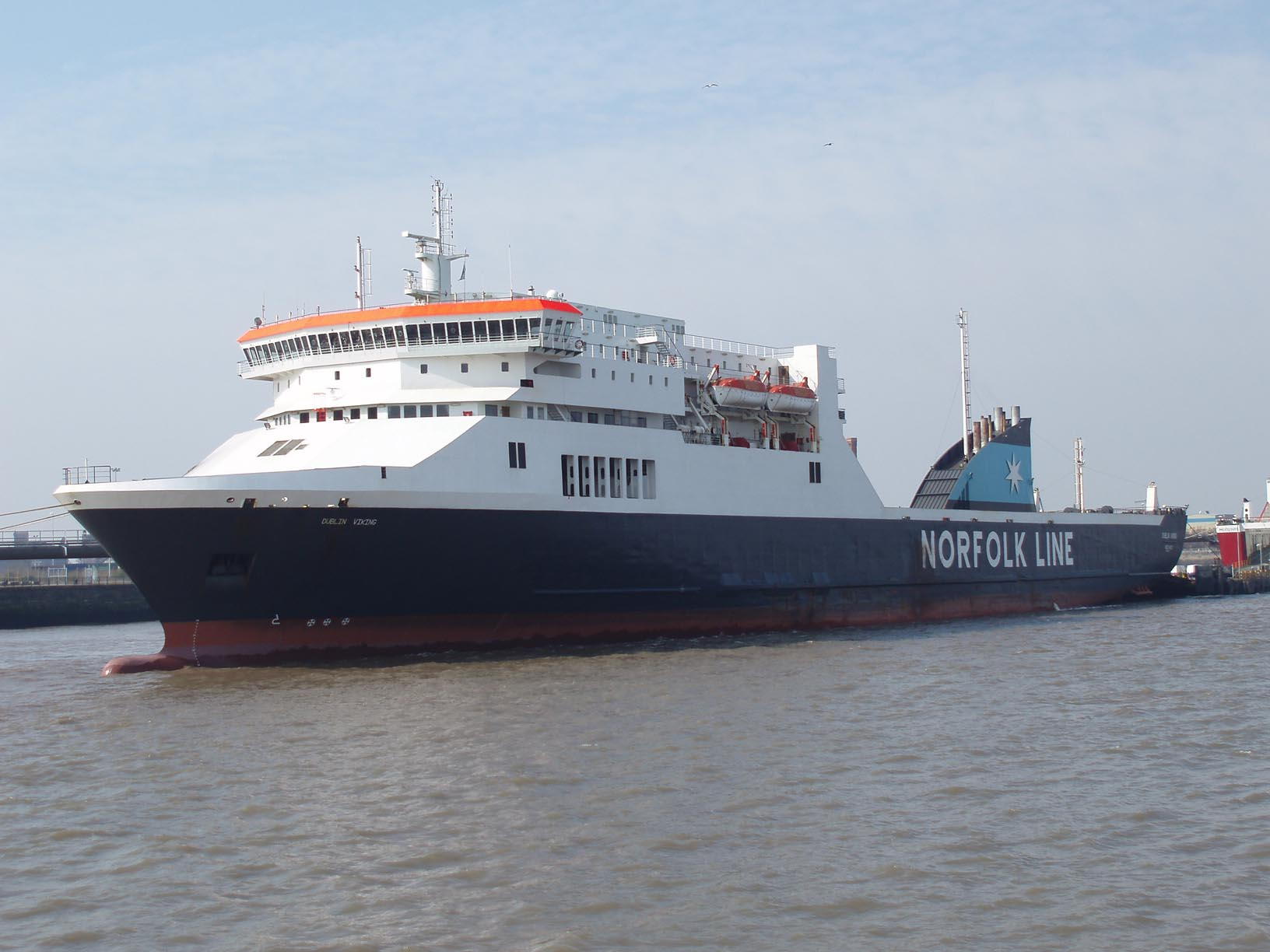
Dublin Viking berthed at Twelve Quays, Birkenhead

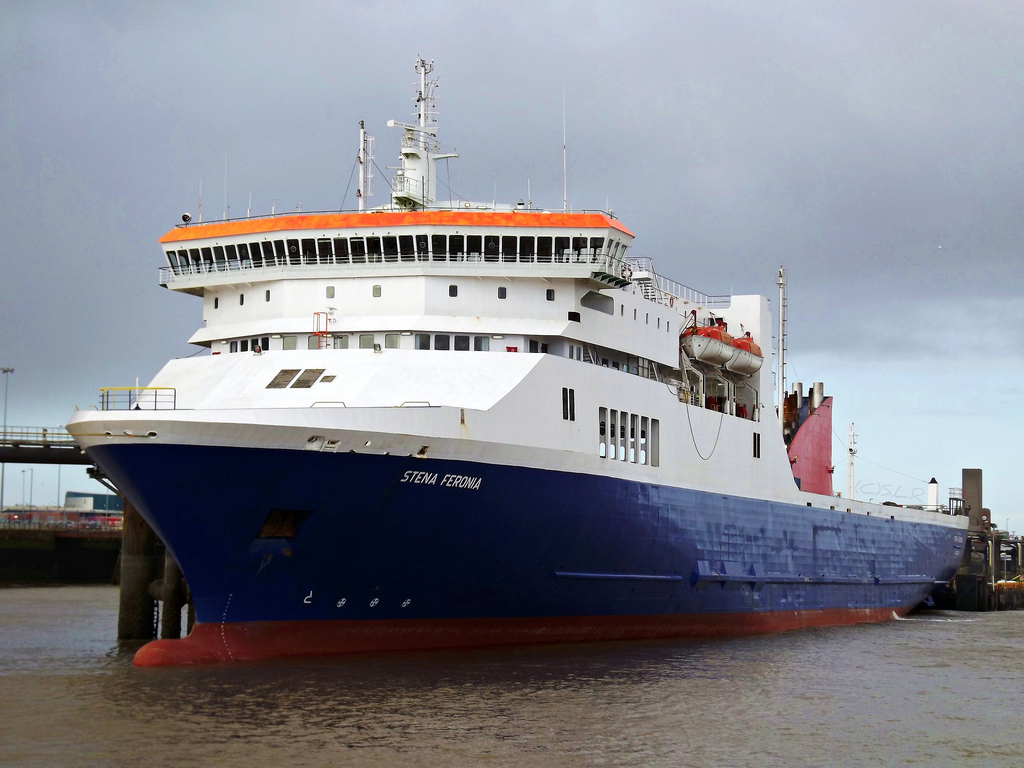
Stena Feronia at Twelve Quays, Birkenhead
