= Pelagos Express =

Roll-on/roll-off ferry

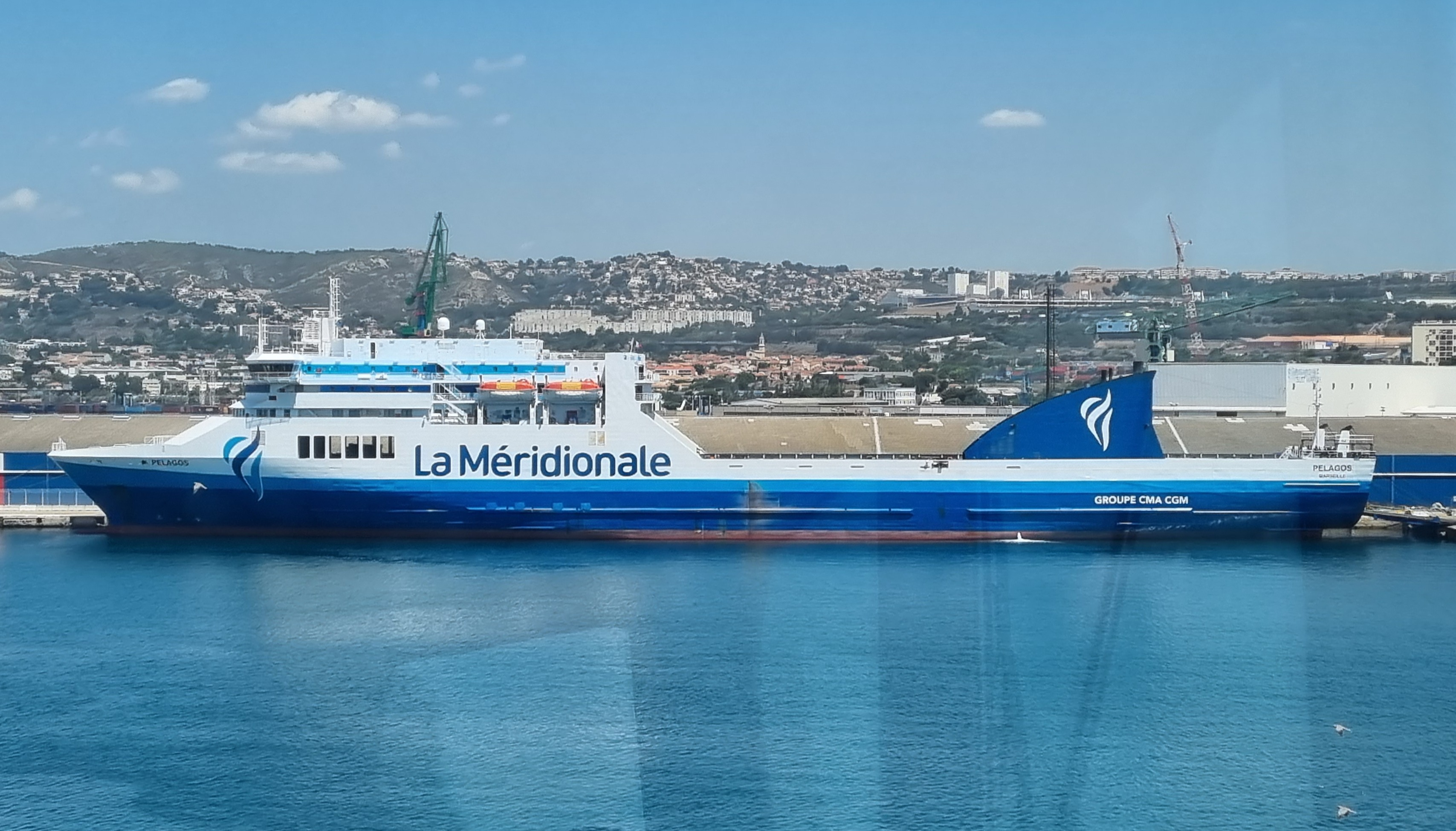
- Pelagos in Marseille in 2023

History
- Name: 1997-2005: Lagan Viking; 2005-2010: Liverpool Viking; 2010-2020: Liverpool Seaways; 2020-2025: Pelagos; 2025-present: Pelagos Express
- Operator: 1997-2001: Norse Irish Ferries; 2001-2005: Norse Merchant Ferries; 2005-2010: Norfolkline; 2010-2020: DFDS Seaways; 2020-present: La Méridionale
- Port of registry: 1997-2004: Bari. Italy; 2004-2011: Belfast, United Kingdom; 2010-2020: Klaipėda, Lithuania; 2020-2025: Marseille, France; 2025-present: Limassol, Cyprus
- Builder: Cantiere Navale Visentini, Italy
- Launched: 12 March 1996
- Completed: 1997
- Maiden voyage: October 1997
- Identification: Call sign: 5BFG3; IMO number: 9136034; MMSI number: 212806000

General characteristics
- Tonnage: 21,856 GT
- Length: 186.0 m (610.2 ft)
- Beam: 25.60 m (84.0 ft)
- Height: 51 m (167.3 ft)
- Draught: 6.3 m (20.7 ft)
- Decks: 4
- Installed power: 2 x Wärtsilä 8R46 diesels
- Propulsion: 2 × Controllable pitch propellers; 2 × Bow thrusters
- Speed: 21.5 knots (40 km/h)
- Capacity: 340 Passengers; 200 Cars; 2460 Lane meters

Pelagos is a roll-on/roll-off ferry owned and operated by French shipping company La Méridionale. The vessel is named after a marine conservation area surrounding Corsica.

== History ==
Pelagos was built in October 1997 as the Lagan Viking, entering service with Norse Irish Ferries on the Belfast to Liverpool route. In February 2001, Cenargo, the owners of Merchant Ferries purchased Norse Irish Ferries. The two companies merged and operated together as Norse Merchant Ferries. Ahead of the arrival of a new larger vessel from Cantiere Navale Visentini with the same name to replace her on the Belfast to Liverpool route, Lagan Viking was renamed Liverpool Viking in January 2005 in order to free up her name for the new Lagan Viking. Following the arrival of her replacement, Liverpool Viking was redeployed to the former Merchant Ferries Dublin to Liverpool route. In November 2005 the Norse Merchant Group was acquired by Maersk and integrated into Norfolkline.

In July 2010 Norfolkline was acquired by DFDS. The vessel was renamed Liverpool Seaways during her refit in August 2010. In January 2011, DFDS announced that its Liverpool to Dublin route was to end on 31 January, due to the sharp decline in demand since 2008.

Following the cessation of the Liverpool to Dublin service, the Liverpool Seaways was redeployed on DFDS Seaways Baltic Sea routes. In May 2019 Liverpool Seaways was sold to La Méridionale.
