= Porto Viro =

- Comune
- Comune di Porto Viro
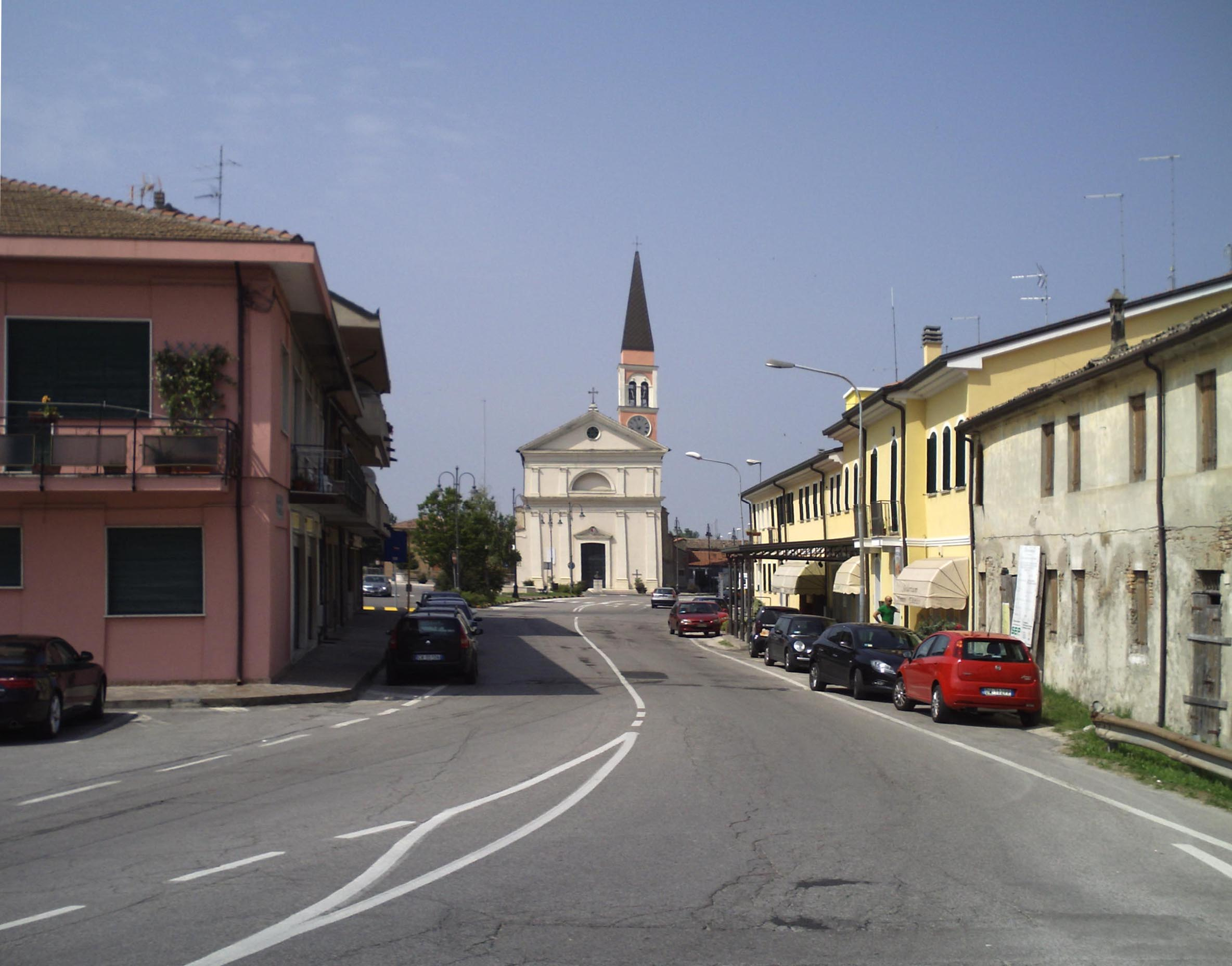

- Coat of arms

- Location within Italy Location within Veneto
- Coordinates: 45°1′N 12°13′E
- Country: Italy
- Region: Veneto
- Province: Province of Rovigo (RO)
- Frazioni: Ca' Cappellino, Ca' Cappello, Porto Levante, Villaregia

Government
  - Mayor: Maura Veronese

Area
  - Total: 133.77 km^{2} (51.65 sq mi)
- Elevation: 2 m (6.6 ft)

Population (31 December 2015)
  - Total: 14,494
  - Density: 108.35/km^{2} (280.63/sq mi)
- Demonym: Portoviresi
- Time zone: UTC+1 (CET)
  - Summer (DST): UTC+2 (CEST)
- Postal code: 45014
- Dialing code: 0426
- Website: Official website

Porto Viro, or Taglio di Porto is a comune (municipality) in the Province of Rovigo in the Italian region Veneto, located about 45 kilometres (28 mi) south of Venice and about 35 kilometres (22 mi) east of Rovigo. It was first created during the Fascist era, but subsequently dissolved. It was established anew on 1 January 1995 by the merger of the communes of Donada and Contarina.

Porto Viro is the last major town on the Po, serving as regional riverine port before it enters the Adriatic.

== Twin towns ==
- Veranópolis, Rio Grande do Sul, Brazil
- Mangalia, Romania
