= MV Sirena Seaways =

RoPax ferry

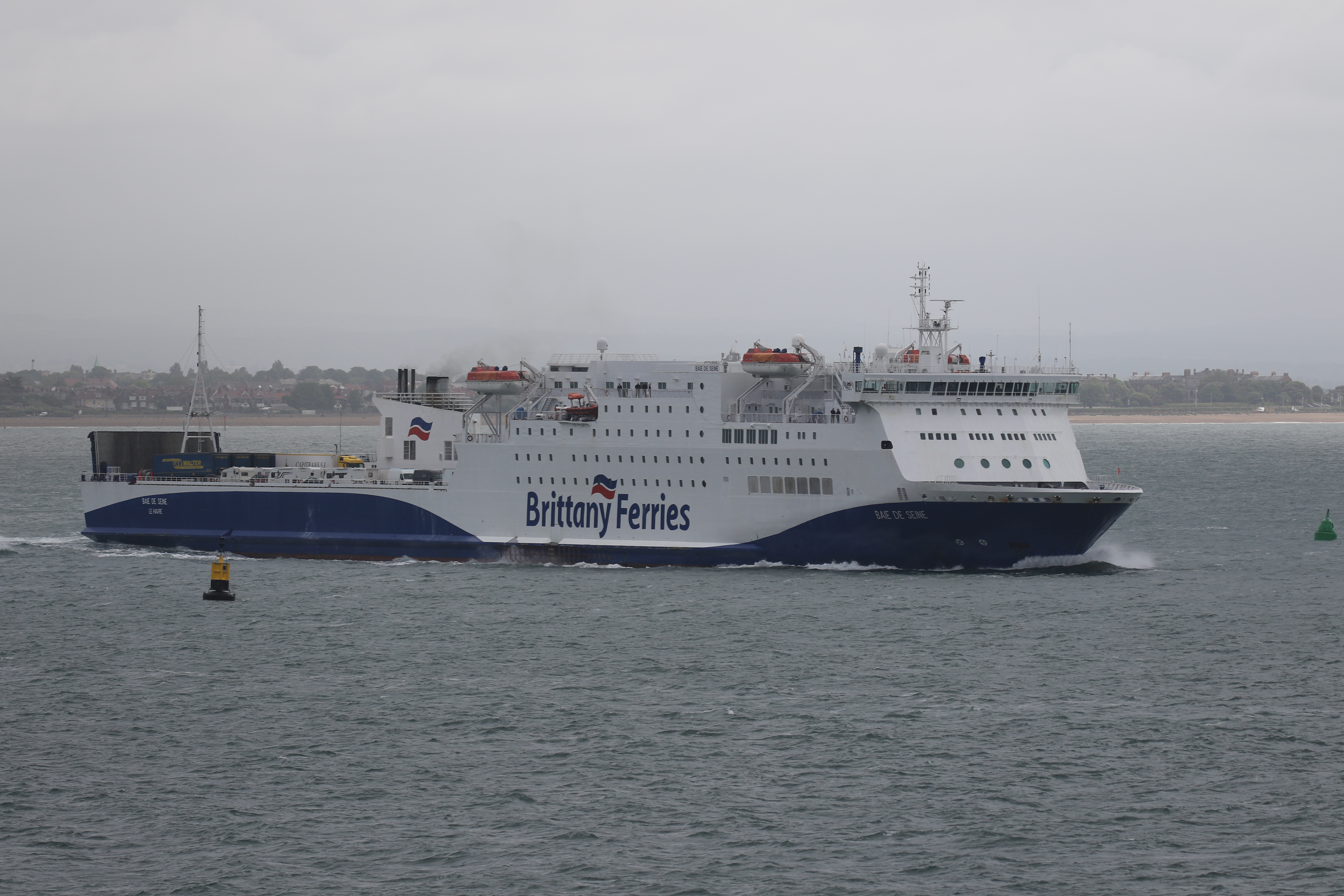

History
- Name: 2002 - 2003: Golfo Dei Delfini; 2003–2013: Dana Sirena; 2013–2015: Sirena Seaways; 2015–2020: Baie de Seine; 2020–present: Sirena Seaways
- Owner: 2002: Lloyd Sardegna; 2002–2012: DFDS Tor Line; 2013 –present: DFDS Seaways
- Operator: 2001–2002: Lloyd Sardegna; 2002–2012: DFDS Tor Line; 2013–2015: DFDS Seaways; 2015–2020: Brittany Ferries; 2020–present: DFDS Seaways
- Port of registry: 2001-2002: Olbia, Italy; 2002–2015: Esbjerg, Denmark; 2015–2020: Le Havre, France; 2020–present: Klaipėda Lithuania
- Route: Klaipėda to Karlshamn
- Builder: Szczecin Shipyard, Poland
- Yard number: B591-1/2
- Laid down: 8 January 2001
- Launched: 21 April 2001
- Christened: 2001
- Completed: 27 November 2002
- Maiden voyage: 2001
- In service: 2003
- Identification: IMO number: 9212163; MMSI number: 226338000; Callsign: FISL
- Status: In service

General characteristics Different Captains
- Class & type: RoPax Ferry
- Tonnage: 22,382 GT
- Length: 199.4 m (654.2 ft)
- Height: 78"3
- Decks: 5 not including car decks
- Installed power: 18,900 KW
- Speed: 23 knots
- Capacity: 610 passengers; 2056 truck lane meters - 160 cars and 84 trucks
- Crew: 60

Sirena Seaways (previously named Baie de Seine, Dana Sirena and MS Golfo Dei Delfini) is a RoPax ferry that as of April 2025 operates for DFDS Seaways, operates again between Kapellskär and Paldiski. The vessel previously operated for DFDS Seaways between Klaipėda and Karlshamn, as well as between Paldiski and Kapellskär, and before that between Esbjerg and Harwich. Between 2015 and 2020, the vessel operated as Baie de Seine for Brittany Ferries on a variety of different routes between Portsmouth, France, and Spain.

== History ==
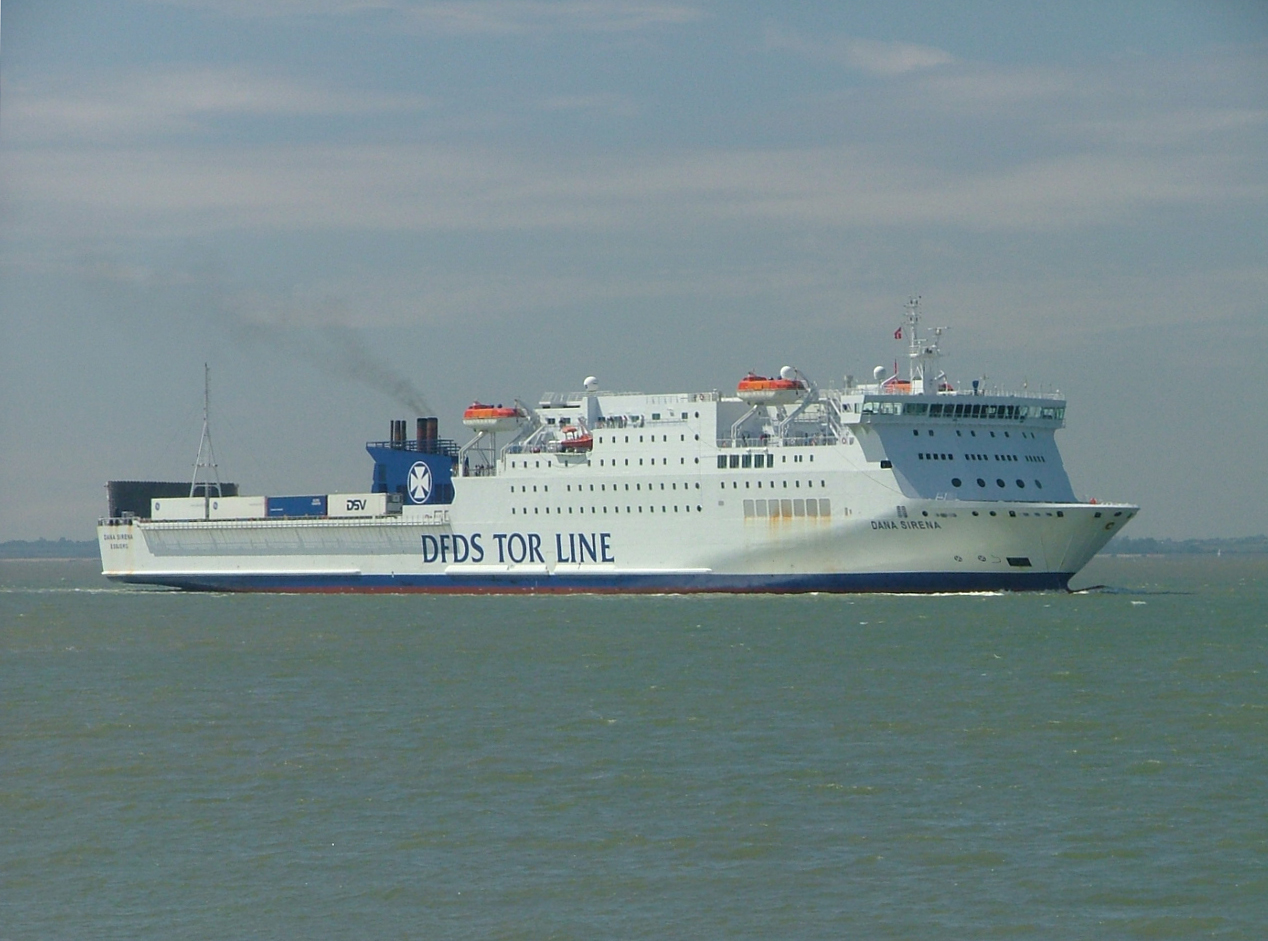
Dana Sirena sailing into Harwich on 29 June 2010

Initially christened MS Golfo Dei Delfini, the ferry was acquired by DFDS Seaways before entering service as Dana Sirena. She was rebuilt with extra passenger accommodations to be operated on the Parkeston Quay, Harwich to Esbjerg route. The hull is constructed of steel with an aluminum alloy superstructure. As Sirena Seaways, the ship had space for 623 passengers and 423 cars. Her sistership, MV Lisco Gloria, formerly Dana Gloria was also owned by DFDS.

She was serviced and repainted in February 2013. During this time the ship was renamed Sirena Seaways. On 22 June 2013, the ship collided with the dock at Parkeston Quay, which resulted in puncture holes in the hull below the water line. Although passengers were stranded on board the ship for two hours, the leak was brought under control, and there were no serious injuries.

The Harwich to Esbjerg route ceased on 29 September 2014 due to loss of passenger traffic. DFDS Seaways closed the route to cut operating costs in order to make the company more competitive. As a result, Sirena Seaways was deployed elsewhere on the DFDS Seaways network.

Later, DFDS Seaways reported that Sirena Seaways was to be moved to other routes such as the Paldiski–Kapellskär route between Estonia and Sweden. It began on this route on 6 October 2014. The ferry was laid-up in Gdańsk during the winter of 2014/15. She received new gas-filters to meet new European regulations covering sulphur emissions. After the fitting of new gas filters, Sirena Seaways briefly entered service between Klaipėda and Karlshamn.

In 2015, Brittany Ferries chartered Sirena Seaways, announcing that she would be named Baie de Seine, and that she would have a livery similar to that of Étretat for use on the Brittany Ferries' "économie" service. Baie de Seine entered service on 9 May 2015 with a freight-only sailing between Portsmouth and Bilbao. The ferry's first passenger service with Brittany Ferries was on 11 May, between Portsmouth and Le Havre. During the charter to Brittany Ferries, Baie de Seine operated between Portsmouth and Le Havre, whilst also operating some services between Portsmouth and Spain (Bilbao and Santander).

In 2017, Brittany Ferries announced that Baie de Seine would return to DFDS Seaways in 2020 and would be replaced by a new vessel ordered from China, to be named Galicia. The routes would be covered by another chartered vessel, Connemara, while they waited for Galicia.

In March 2020, Baie de Seine left Brittany Ferries and returned to DFDS Seaways, reverting to her former name, Sirena Seaways. She was transferred to the Lithuanian flag, with the home port of Klaipėda, and repainted in the new DFDS colour scheme. As of April 2020, Sirena Seaways returned to service between Klaipėda and Karlshamn.

== Routes ==
Under DFDS

- Harwich to Esbjerg 2002–2014
- Paldiski–Kapellskär 2014
- Karlshamn to Klaipėda 2015, 2020–present
- Kappelskär to Paldiski now

Under Brittany Ferries

- Portsmouth to Le Havre 2015–2020
- Portsmouth to Bilbao 2015–2020
- Portsmouth to Santander 2015–2020
