= Britannia Seaways =

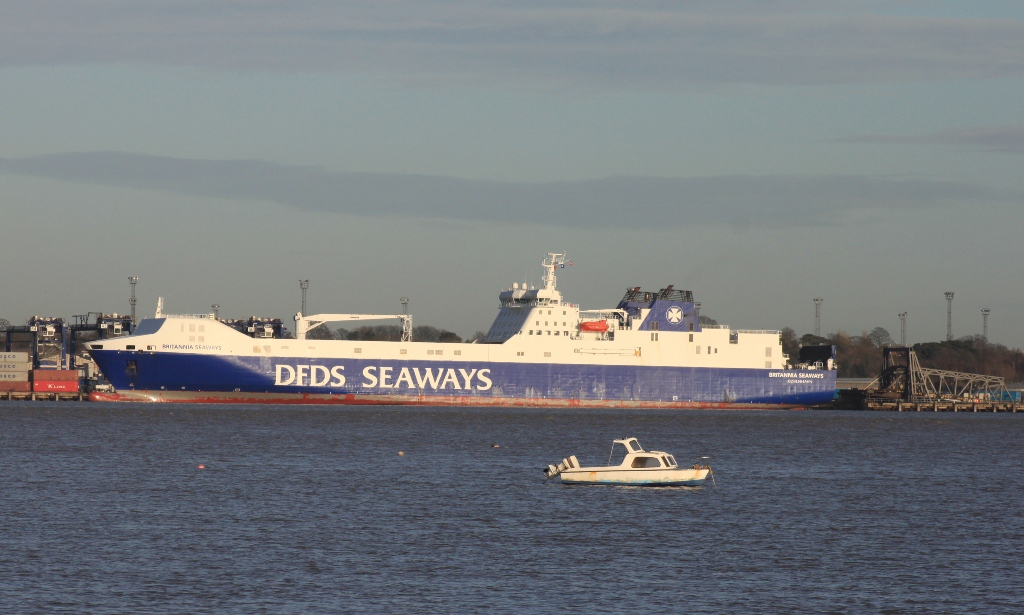
- center

History
- Name: 2000 - 2011: Tor Britannia; 2011 - present: Britannia Seaways
- Owner: DFDS A/S
- Operator: 2000 - 2011: DFDS Tor Line; 2011 - present: DFDS Seaways
- Port of registry: Copenhagen, Denmark
- Builder: Fincantieri
- Yard number: 6022
- Launched: 21 December 1998
- Completed: 2000
- Identification: Call sign OZTS2; IMO number: 9153032; MMSI number: 219825000
- Status: In service

General characteristics
- Type: Ro-ro cargo ship
- Tonnage: 24,196 GT; 11,089 tonnes deadweight (DWT)
- Length: 197.82 m (649.02 ft)
- Beam: 25.90 m (84.97 ft)
- Draught: 7.50 m (24.61 ft)

Britannia Seaways is a ro-ro cargo ship operated by DFDS Seaways.

== Fire ==
On Saturday 16 November 2013, Britannia Seaways caught fire in the North Sea, trapping 32 crew on board. Helicopters sent from Norway were unable to take the crew off the ship due to bad weather conditions. The fire caught alight in a container on one of the upper decks, and was extinguished 13 hours after it broke out. The ship was carrying military equipment to Norway for a military exercise and reached Bergen a few days later. No injuries were reported. The cause of the fire was unknown and was under investigation.
