= MV Lisco Gloria =

Coordinates: 54°41′48″N 10°38′48″E

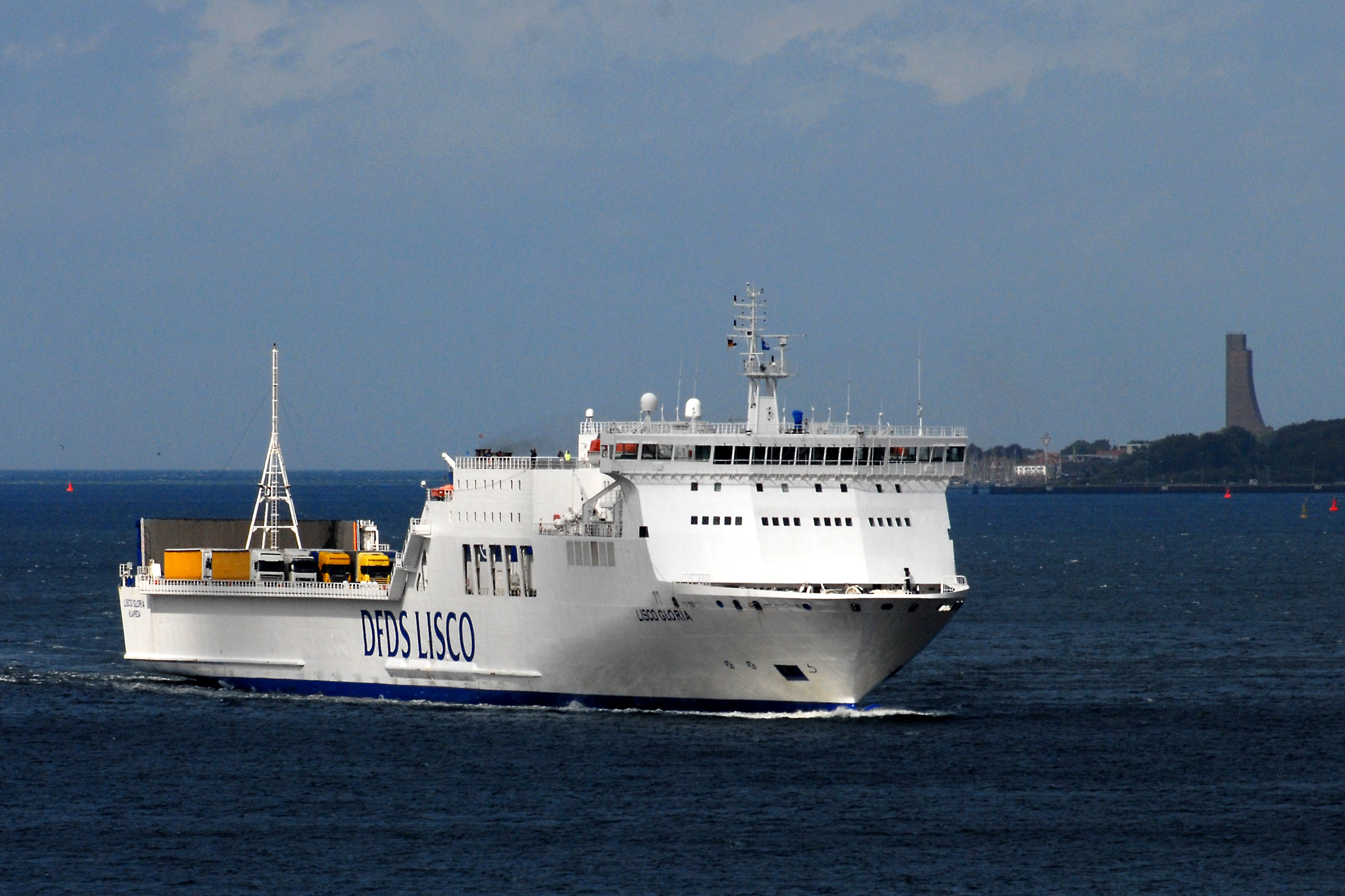

History
- Name: Launched as Golfo Dei Coralli; 2002–2003: Dana Gloria; 2003–2010: Lisco Gloria
- Owner: 2002: Bank Polska Kasa Opieki S.A., Poland; 2002: DFDS Tor Line A/S, Denmark; 2002–2010: DFDS A/S, Denmark
- Operator: 2003–2010: DFDS Lisco
- Port of registry: 5/2002–7/2002: Olbia, Italy; 7/2002 – 2003: Copenhagen, Denmark; 6/2003–: Klaipėda, Lithuania
- Route: Kiel–Klaipėda
- Ordered: 31 March 1999
- Builder: Stocznia Szczecinska im. A. Warskiego, Szczecin, Poland
- Yard number: B591/I/1
- Laid down: 7 June 1999
- Launched: 27 January 2001
- Completed: 19 July 2002
- In service: 2001–2010
- Identification: IMO number: 9212151; Call sign: LYQT
- Fate: Caught fire on 9 October 2010. Declared constructive total loss and scrapped.

General characteristics (as built)
- Tonnage: 17,150 GT; 7,300 DWT

General characteristics (2002)
- Type: ROPAX
- Tonnage: 20,140 GT; 6,042 NT; 6,802 DWT
- Length: 199.1 m (653 ft) (overall)
- Beam: 25 m (82 ft) (moulded)
- Draft: 6.32 m (20.7 ft)
- Depth: 14.2 m (47 ft) (moulded)
- Installed power: 2 × Wärtsilä 9L46C; 18,900 kW (combined)
- Speed: 22 knots (41 km/h; 25 mph)
- Capacity: 308 passengers; 2,600 lane meters
- Crew: 32

MV Lisco Gloria was a ROPAX ferry, sailing under a Lithuanian flag for the shipowner DFDS Seaways. An explosive fire engulfed the ship while en route to Klaipėda on 9 October 2010.

== Specifications ==
The ship was built in 2001 at the Szczecin Shipyard as the Golfo Dei Coralli for the shipowner Lloyd Sardegna Compagnia Di Navigazione from Olbia in Italy. She was however not delivered, but instead bought by DFDS on 19 July 2002, and was sailed under a Danish flag as the Dana Gloria. During this time she sailed on the route from Harwich to Esbjerg as the replacement for Dana Anglia.

In June 2003 she was in turn replaced by her sister ship, the Dana Sirena, that also sailed under a Danish flag and provided facilities for 600 instead of 308 passengers. The ship was later transferred to Rasa Multipurpose Shipping, Klaipėda, renamed Lisco Gloria and sailed for DFDS Lisco (incorporated into DFDS Seaways in 2010) on the route between Klaipėda and Kiel. The ship had sailed under a Lithuanian flag since 1 June 2003.

== 2010 fire ==
On 9 October 2010, the ship was on its way from Kiel to Klaipėda, carrying 204 passengers and 32 crewmembers, mostly Lithuanian citizens. Just after midnight, as the ship was travelling in the Fehmarn Belt, some 8–10 km south of Lolland, an onboard explosion occurred on the car deck, which resulted in a fire that later engulfed the entire ship. Being in the zone of German responsibility, all passengers and crew were rescued from the ferry by the German Coast Guard and some smaller vessels that had hurried to the scene, and transferred to other ferries, most of them on board the Deutschland. 3 persons, that had inhaled smoke were transferred to a hospital by helicopters. The German Coast Guard said that the incident showed no signs of being a terrorist attack. The ship later drifted into Danish waters and the Danish Coast Guard dispatched an oil containment vessel to the site because Lisco Gloria had some 200 tons of fuel oil on board. A German team managed to enter the ship and released the anchor. However, officials said that it was almost impossible to put out the fire and concentrated on cooling the hull to prevent her from sinking. In the morning she listed at 15 degrees. After the fire she was first towed to Odense, Denmark, where she was declared to be a constructive total loss. On 16 February 2011 she began her final journey to Klaipėda where her scrapping was expected to take five months. However, before the scrapping took place the new owner investigated whether the ship could be repaired despite having been declared constructive total loss due to expected repair costs exceeding DKK 450 million. The scrapping began in 2011 and the demolition of the ship was reportedly finished in by early 2012.
