= Corona Seaways =

Cargo ship built in 2008

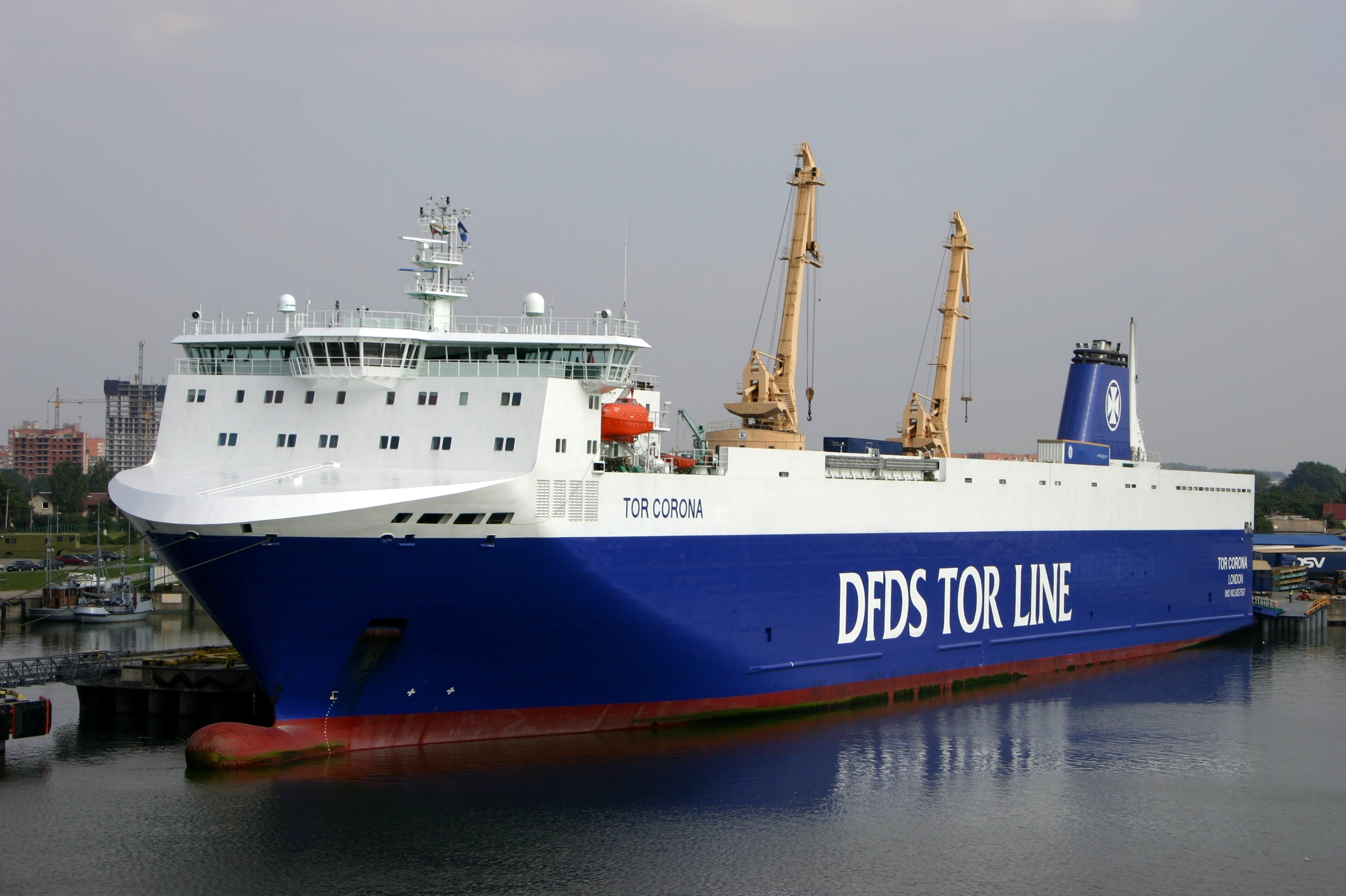
- As Tor Corona in Klaipėda, 2008

History
- Name: Corona Sea (2018-Present); Corona Seaways (2012–2018); Tor Corona (2008–2012)
- Owner: Ellingsen Ro-Ro Ltd (2018–Present); Seatreasure Ltd (2008–2018); Snowdon Leasing Co. Ltd (2008)
- Operator: Transfennica (2018–present); DFDS Seaways (2010–2018); DFDS Tor Line (2008–2010)
- Port of registry: London, United Kingdom
- Route: Hanko – Lübeck
- Builder: Jinling Shipyard, Nanjing, China
- Yard number: 402
- Laid down: 20 October 2006
- Launched: 25 April 2007
- Completed: 18 January 2008
- In service: 18 January 2008
- Identification: IMO number: 9357597; MMSI number: 235059487
- Status: In Service

General characteristics
- Tonnage: 25,609 GT; 11,300 tonnes deadweight (DWT)
- Length: 187 m (613.52 ft)
- Beam: 26.50 m (86.94 ft)
- Draught: 6.40 m (21.00 ft)
- Installed power: 2 × MAN 9L48/60B diesels; combined 19,200 kW
- Speed: Max 24.6 knots
- Crew: 19
- Notes: Lane metres 3178m

Corona Seaways (formerly named Tor Corona) is a Roll-on/Roll-off Cargo ship that was built in 2008 for DFDS Seaways (Freight Division) to operate on the Tor Line. This continued until major restructuring within DFDS with the Tor Line brand being merged into DFDS Seaways. The ship was operated by DFDS Seaways until 2018 when it was moved to Transfennica and renamed Corona Sea.

== 2013 onboard fire ==
Corona Seaways was chartered to operate an average 6-day circular freight hauling route between Fredericia, Copenhagen Denmark, Klaipėda, Lithuania and occasionally Kiel, Germany. At 2100 on 3 December 2013, a cargo that included 170 vehicles, 10 of which had drivers, was loaded. At 2110, Corona Seaways set sail for Klaipėda via Copenhagen. A fire was discovered at 0215 on 4 December 2013. The fire was declared out at 1325 and after dampening the hot spots, the ship was handed back to the crew at 2110. The vessel suffered structural damage to the upper deck and to the electrical system. There were two vehicles at the location of the fire. One was a Renault Premium 250.18 truck and the other was a Renault Mascott-Master can that it was carrying. Another Renault Premium 410 cab was also severely damage along its nearside along with the other vehicles surrounding.

The main cause was put down to the primary vehicle involved being un-roadworthy with the fire being started by faulty wiring within the engine compartment, particularly the starter motor. Due to the way the electrical system works with the key left in the ignition, there would have been a continual current flow in the cable from the battery despite the key being in the stop/park position. Once the fire started, it quickly spread to the rest of the vehicle. Due to the response of the crew along with the fire extinguishing system, along with the emergency services back at port, minimum damage was caused to both cargo, and vessel and following repairs at Landskrona, she re-entered service on 29 December 2013.
