= FRS Iberia/Maroc =

Moroccan-Spanish group of companies

FRS Iberia/Maroc / DFDS
- Industry: Shipping
- Founded: 2000
- Headquarters: Tarifa & Tangier, Spain & Morocco
- Area served: Strait of Gibraltar; Canary Islands
- Services: Passenger transportation Freight transportation
- Parent: Förde Reederei Seetouristik
- Website: http://frs.es/

FRS Iberia/Maroc were three independent companies operating under a single brand, one based in Morocco (FRS Maroc) and the two others (FRS Iberia and Ferrysur) in Spain, founded in 2000 by their parent company Förde Reederei Seetouristik. The companies operated mainly in the Strait of Gibraltar with a fleet of eight ferries.

== Routes ==
FRS Iberia/Maroc operated services across the Strait of Gibraltar from Tarifa and Algeciras to Ceuta, Tangier and Tanger-Med. On 23 May 2018 it was announced that FRS Iberia will acquire the routes Melilla-Motril and Huelva-Las Palmas-S. C. Tenerife from Naviera Armas due to monopoly concerns on the acquisition of Trasmediterranea by Armas. The necessary equipment is included in the deal.

In September 2023, FRS World announced that FRS Iberia/Maroc was bought by DFDS company, officially part of DFDS Seaways.

== Fleet ==
=== Current vessels ===
FRS Iberia/Maroc / DFDS currently operates a fleet of seven vessels.

Name	Built	Enterered service	Flag	Route	References
Algeciras Jet	1999	2008	Cyprus	Tarifa-Tanger	
Ceuta Jet	1998	2003	Cyprus	Tarifa-Tanger	
Kattegat	1996	2014	Cyprus	Algeciras-Tanger Med	
Levante Jet	2015	2021	Cyprus	Algeciras-Ceuta	
Poniente Jet	1999	2023	Cyprus		
Tanger Express	1996	2012	Morocco	Algeciras-Tanger Med	
Tarifa Jet	1997	2006	Cyprus	Tarifa-Tanger	

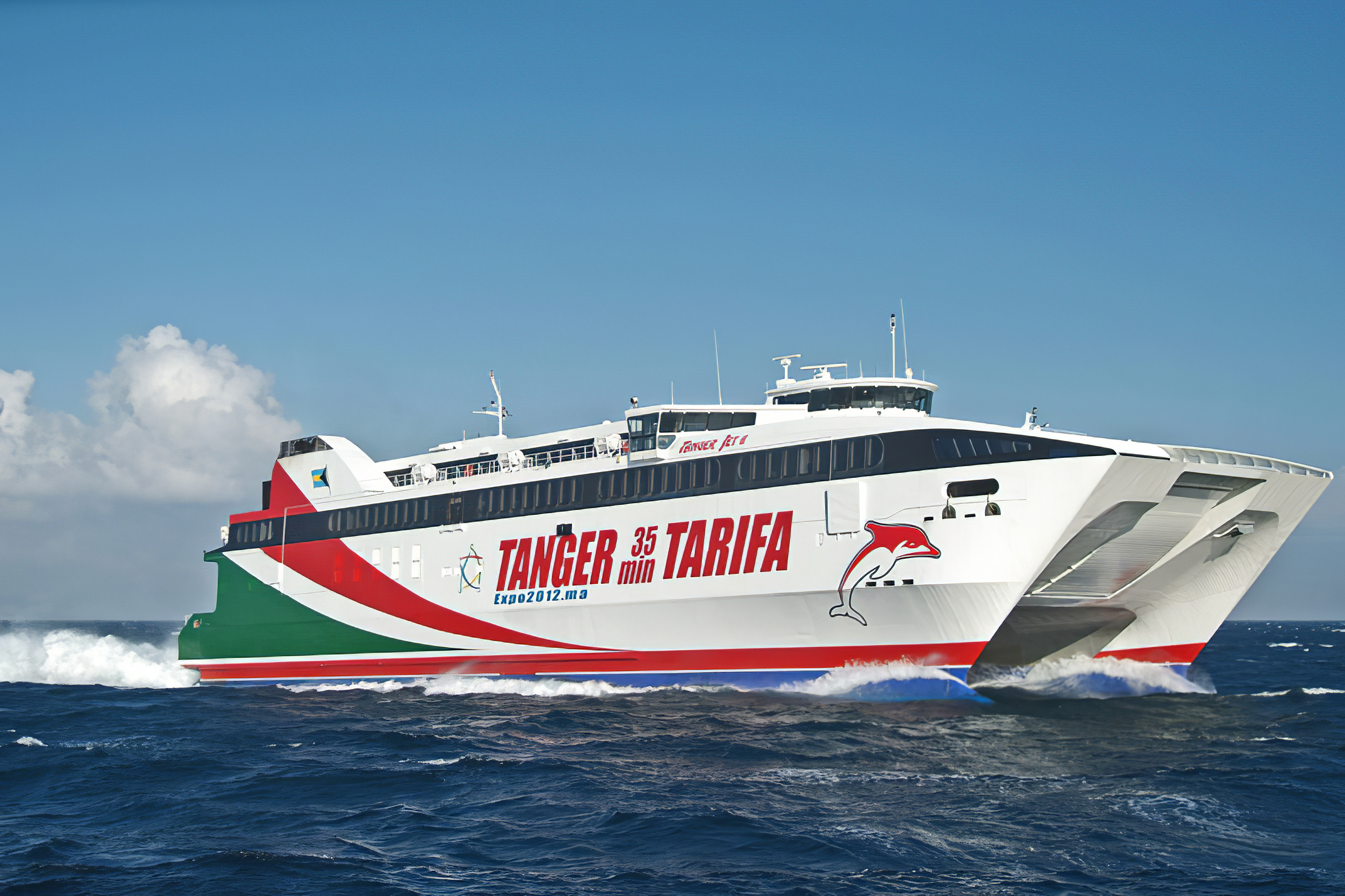
The former Tanger Jet II, sailing between Tarifa and Tanger

=== Past vessels ===
- Thundercat I - since 2008 MS MegaJet with Seajet
- Nicea - sold for scrap in 2010
- Eurovoyager - sold for scrap in 2012
- Stena Feronia - returned to Stena RoRo, on charter to Intershipping
- Tanger Jet II - sold in 2013 to Conferry and renamed to Virgin de Coromoto
- San Gwann - sold in 2021 and renamed to San Giorgio
- Al Andalus Express re-chartered in 2020 to Naviera Armas
- Miramar Express sold in 2024 to Lakeway Link and renamed Lakeway Express
- Algeciras Jet sold in 2024 to L'Express des Iles owned by FRS and renamed to Ruby Express
