= Corbière Seaways =

Roll-on/roll-off ferry built in 2005

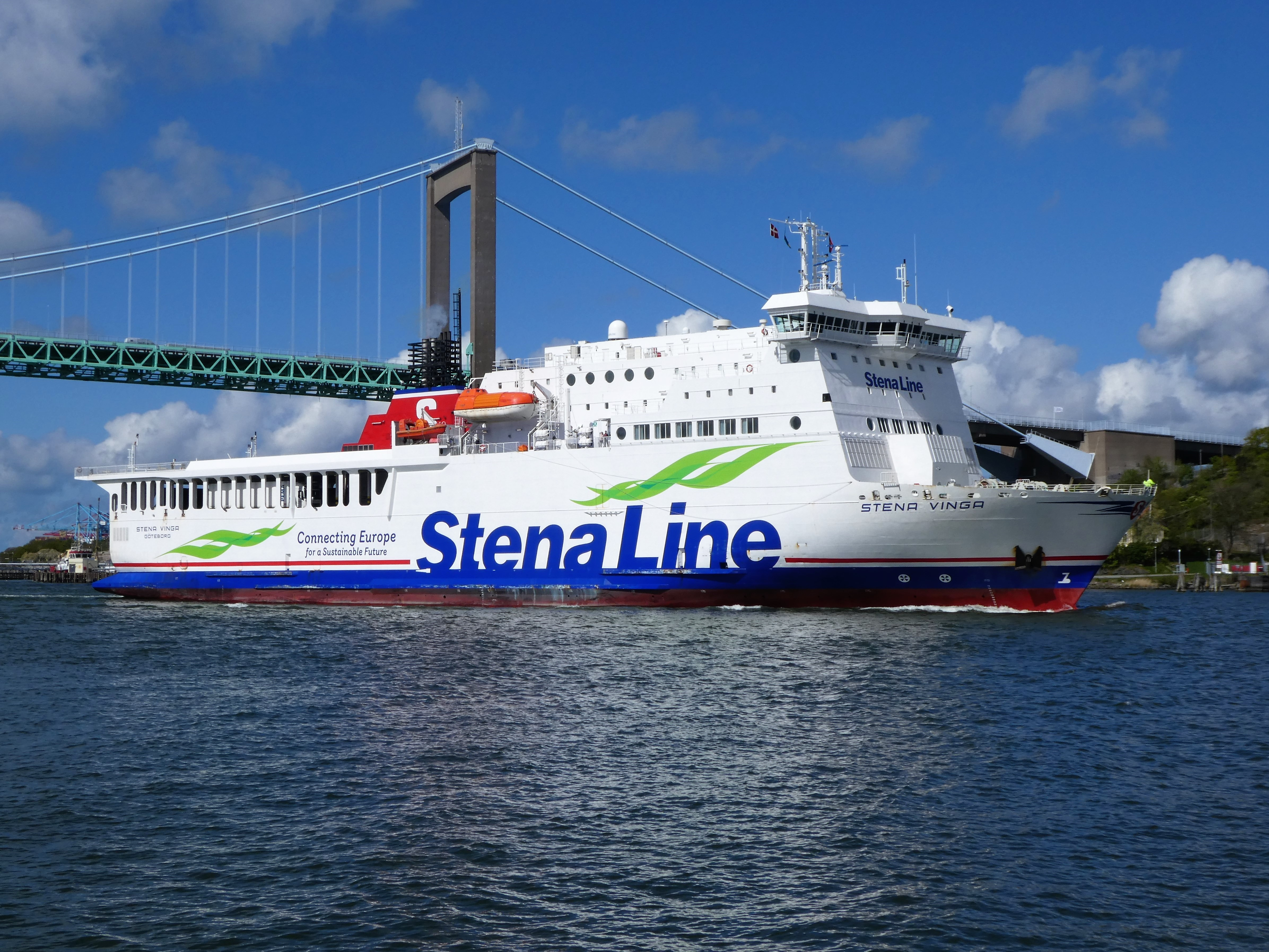
- Corbière Seaways as Stena Vinga in 2019

History
- Name: 2005–2018: Hammerodde; 2018–2026: Stena Vinga; 2026–present: Corbière Seaways
- Owner: 2005–2017: BornholmerFærgen; 2017–2026: Stena Line; 2026–present: DFDS Seaways
- Operator: 2005–2018: BornholmerFærgen; 2018–2025: Stena Line; 2023: Intershipping; 2025–present: DFDS Seaways
- Port of registry: Dover, United Kingdom
- Route: Portsmouth⇄Jersey
- Builder: Merwede Shipyard, Hardinxveld, Netherlands
- Launched: April 11 2005
- In service: 2005
- Identification: IMO number: 9323699; MMSI number: 266467000; Callsign: SBCT
- Status: in active service

General characteristics
- Type: ROPAX ferry
- Tonnage: 14,551 GT
- Length: 129.9 m (426 ft 2 in)
- Beam: 23.4 m (76 ft 9 in)
- Draft: 5.6 m (18 ft 4 in)
- Installed power: 2 × MaK 9M32 diesel; 4,320 kW each at 600 rpm
- Speed: max 18.5 knots (34.3 km/h; 21.3 mph)
- Capacity: 400 passengers; 200 cars; 1,500 m (4,921 ft) lane for vehicles

Corbière Seaways is a ROPAX ferry owned by DFDS Seaways operating between Portsmouth, England and Jersey in the Channel Islands. She was built in 2005 as Hammerodde for Bornholmstrafikken (later BornholmerFærgen), operating on its Baltic Sea services. In 2017, she was purchased by Stena Line, which briefly chartered her back to BornholmerFærgen, before entering service with the company in 2018 as Stena Vinga. In 2025, she was chartered to DFDS after the company won the tender to operate ferry services for Jersey. In 2026, DFDS purchased the ferry and renamed her to her current name.

== History ==
=== Bornholmstrafikken/BornholmerFærgen ===
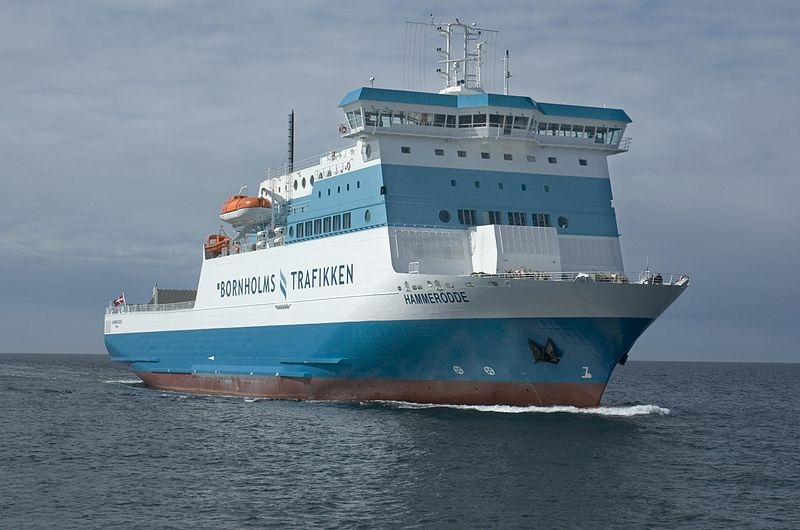
Hammerodde in 2005

The Hammerodde entered service with Bornholmstrafikken in 2005. She operated routes linking Køge, Rønne and Ystad, also completing some services between Rønne and Sassnitz. After this, in 2010 she was refit and rebuilt at STX Europe, Helsinki adding an additional freight deck aft of her superstructure, as well as a 5m long ducktail sponson, new rudders and propellers.

=== Stena Line ===
In 2017, the Hammerodde was sold to Stena Line and chartered back to Danske Færger until Autumn 2018, where she entered service with Stena Line as Stena Vinga on the Gothenburg to Frederikshavn route.

In 2020 she covered for the Stena Horizon which was released for cover on the Holyhead to Dublin route. On March 21 2021 she returned to serve the Gothenburg to Frederikshavn route and had the last service on March 26 2021. She serviced Travemünde and Liepāja for 4 months before switching to different routes every few months. From December 18 2022 to January 26 2023, she covered for Stena Danica whilst it was being refitted. On March 1 2023 she covered for Stena Germanica until March 17 2023.

In the summer of 2023, the Stena Vinga was chartered to Intershipping for services across the Strait of Gibraltar.

=== DFDS ===
On 16 December 2024, following the decision by the Government of Jersey to appoint DFDS Seaways as its ferry operator DFDS announced it would charter the Stena Vinga. In early March 2025, she sailed to Portsmouth for trials. On 18 March 2025, she was trialed in St Helier Harbour. She entered service for DFDS 10 days later between Portsmouth and Jersey.

On 5 May 2026, it was announced that DFDS would purchase the Stena Vinga, with plans to both rename and re-flag her. DFDS announced in June 2026 that the naming of the vessel would come as the result of a public vote, from a shortlist drawn up from public suggestions. In July, the winning name was announced as Corbière Seaways. In November, DFDS completed the acquisition and the ferry was subsequently withdrawn from service to be repainted in the company's livery, with the Jersey-Portsmouth route being covered by backup vessel Cote D'Albatre until Corbière Seaways returns to service later the same month.

== Layout ==
The roll-on/roll-off ferry has an overall length of 129.9 meters, a beam of 23.4 m and a draft of 5.6 m, the gross tonnage amounts 14,551 GT. The machinery consists of two MaK 9M32 diesel 8640 kW (38,500 HP) allowing a maximum service speed of 18.5 knots (34.3 km/h; 21.3 mph). 400 passengers and 200 cars can be accommodated on board.
