= Levante Jet =

High-speed ferry built in 2015

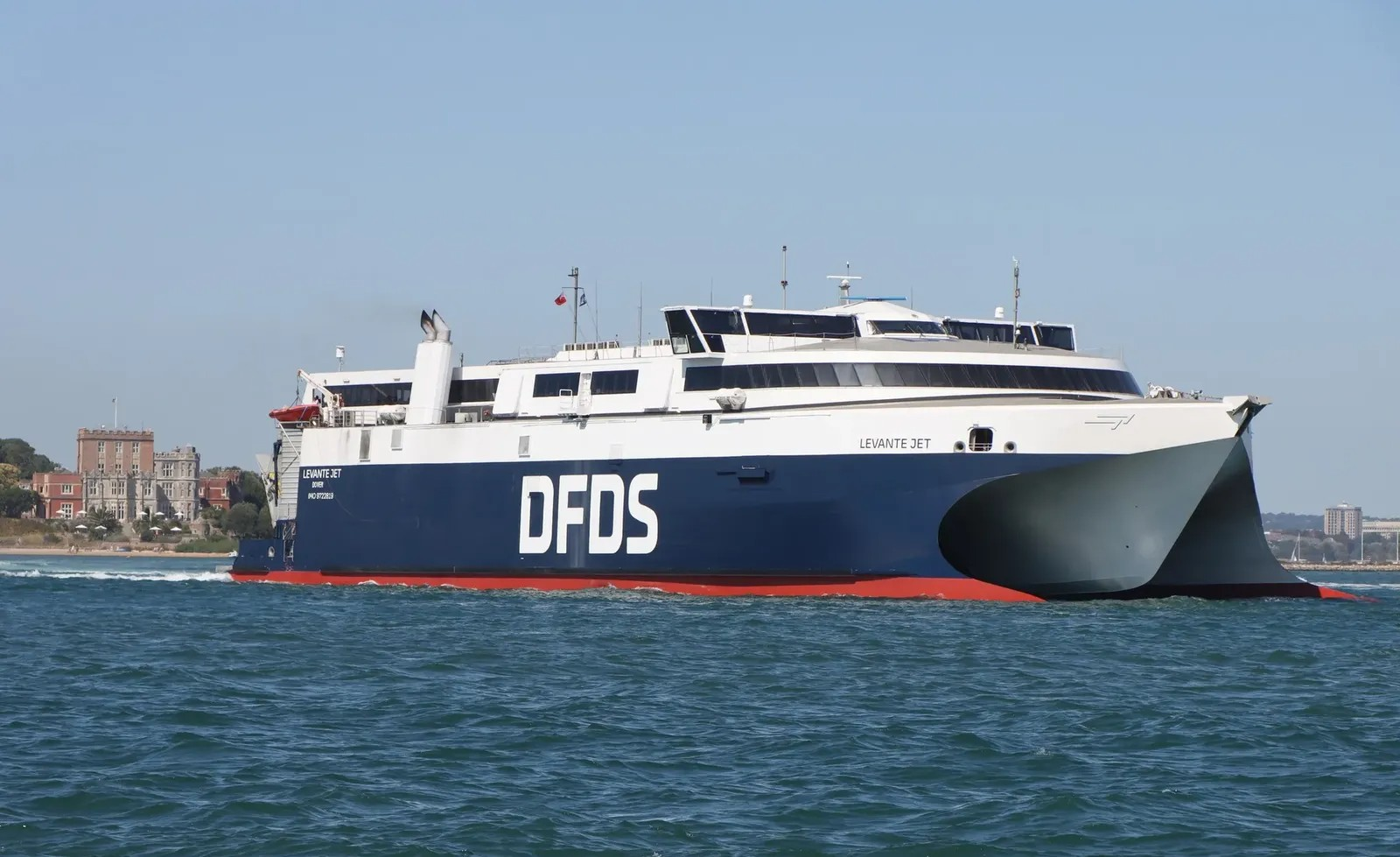
- Levante Jet in Poole

History
- Name: 2015–2021: Akane; 2021–present: Levante Jet
- Owner: 2015–2021: Sado Kisen; 2021–2024: FRS Iberia/Maroc; 2024–present: DFDS Seaways
- Operator: 2015–2021: Sado Kisen; 2021–2024: FRS Iberia/Maroc; 2024–present: DFDS Seaways
- Port of registry: Dover, United Kingdom
- Route: Poole⇄Jersey
- Builder: Incat, Tasmania, Australia
- Yard number: 068
- Launched: March 12, 2015
- In service: 2015
- Identification: IMO number: 9722819; MMSI number: 210287000; Callsign: 5BYV5
- Status: in active service

General characteristics
- Type: HSC ferry
- Tonnage: 5,337 GT
- Length: 85.2 m (279 ft 6 in)
- Beam: 26.2 m (85 ft 11 in)
- Draft: 3.4 m (11 ft 2 in)
- Installed power: 4 × 20 cylinder Waterjets Caterpillar C280-16 diesel engines; 22600 kW
- Speed: max 40.0 knots (74.1 km/h; 46.0 mph)
- Capacity: 692 passengers; 151 cars

Levante Jet is a high-speed catamaran ferry owned and operated by DFDS Seaways. Originally serving the Jōetsu and Ogi route for Sado Kisen as Akane, she was sold in 2024 to FRS Iberia/Maroc as Levante Jet, which was later acquired by DFDS. Currently, she operates between Poole, England and Jersey in the Channel Islands.

== History ==
Levante Jet was completed in 2014 by Incat, Australia and was delivered in March 2015. She was first named Incat 068 by Incat.

=== Sado Kisen ===
Levante Jet entered service with Sado Kisen in 2015 as Akane. She operated routes linking Jōetsu and Ogi before being put up for sale on November 15, 2020.

=== FRS Iberia/Maroc ===
In 2021, the vessel was sold and entered service with FRS Iberia/Maroc and was renamed Levante Jet. She connected Ceuta to Algeciras while in service.

=== DFDS ===
In December 2024, after DFDS Seaways won the bid to be Jersey's new ferry company, DFDS said it would deploy the Levante Jet on services between Poole and Jersey. On 3 January 2025, DFDS Seaways announced that the Levante Jet would be reflagged to the UK prior to her deployment on Poole to Jersey route on 17 April 2025.

Meanwhile, the sister island of Jersey, Guernsey chose Brittany Ferries in their tender bid.

== Layout ==
The catamaran has an overall length of 85.20 meters, a beam of 26.20 m and a draft of 3.40 m, the gross tonnage amounts 5,537 GT. The machinery consists of four 20 - cylinder Waterjet Caterpillar C280-16 engines with a total output of 226000 kW (38,500 HP) allowing a maximum service speed of 40 knots (74 km/h; 46 mph). 692 passengers and 151 cars can be accommodated on board; the car deck is accessed via stern ramps.
