= DFDS Seaways =

Danish shipping company

- Industry: Freight transportation passenger/car transportation
- Genre: Ferry company
- Predecessor: DFDS Tor Line; DFDS Lisco; Scandinavian Seaways; Norfolkline
- Headquarters: Copenhagen, Denmark
- Area served: Baltic Sea; English Channel; North Sea; Strait of Gibraltar
- Parent: DFDS
- Divisions: DFDS Seaways France
- Website: www.dfds.com

DFDS Seaways is a Danish shipping company that operates passenger and freight services across northern Europe. Following the acquisition of Norfolkline in 2010, DFDS restructured its other shipping divisions (DFDS Tor Line and DFDS Lisco) into the previously passenger-only operation of DFDS Seaways.

== History ==
=== Fleet renewal ===
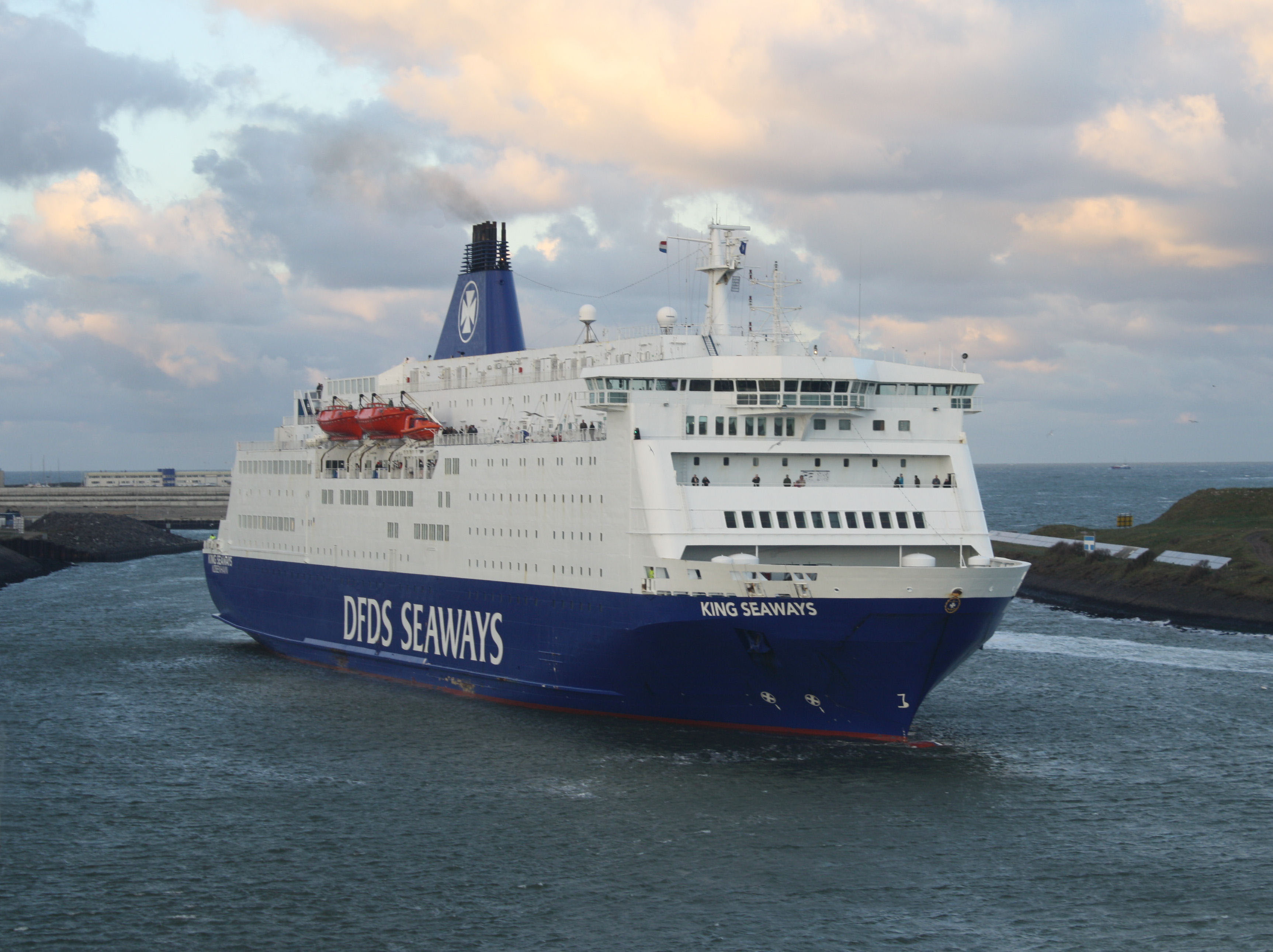
King Seaways in IJmuiden

DFDS Seaways renewed its fleet in 2006, purchasing MS King of Scandinavia and MS Princess of Norway to replace the last ships still in service that dated from the 1970s. The company has acquired a reputation for purchasing used ships, as well as for taking over the build contracts or taking delivery of newbuilds originally ordered by other companies. The last time DFDS Seaways ordered a newbuild of its own was in 1978. DFDS Seaways stopped serving Sweden in 2006, when MS Princess of Scandinavia was taken out of service, and the Copenhagen–Oslo service stopped calling at Helsingborg. In May 2008, DFDS made public its plan to close down the loss-making United Kingdom–Norway service on 1 September 2008. MS Queen of Scandinavia, the ship that was used in the service, has since been chartered to St Peter Line.

=== Acqusition of Norfolkline ===
In July 2010, DFDS acquired Norfolkline from Maersk. The Norfolkline routes and vessels were integrated into DFDS Seaways. DFDS Seaways now had the Dover–Dunkirk route, and launched the new Dover–Calais route in February 2012.

=== Brand refresh ===
In 2015, DFDS announced that it had unveiled a new logo, which saw 'DFDS' in a new font, and the logo with the white Maltese cross losing its outer circle; it announced furthermore that the DFDS Seaways subsidiary would be shortened to just 'DFDS' carrying a dark blue hull in the same font instead of the traditional light blue hull, and a Maltese cross with a circle. The first vessels to receive the new livery—and the new name scheme that would eventually be rolled out throughout the whole fleet—were the former MyFerryLink ferries Rodin (now Côte des Dunes) and the Berlioz (now Côte des Flandres).

=== New ferry purchases ===
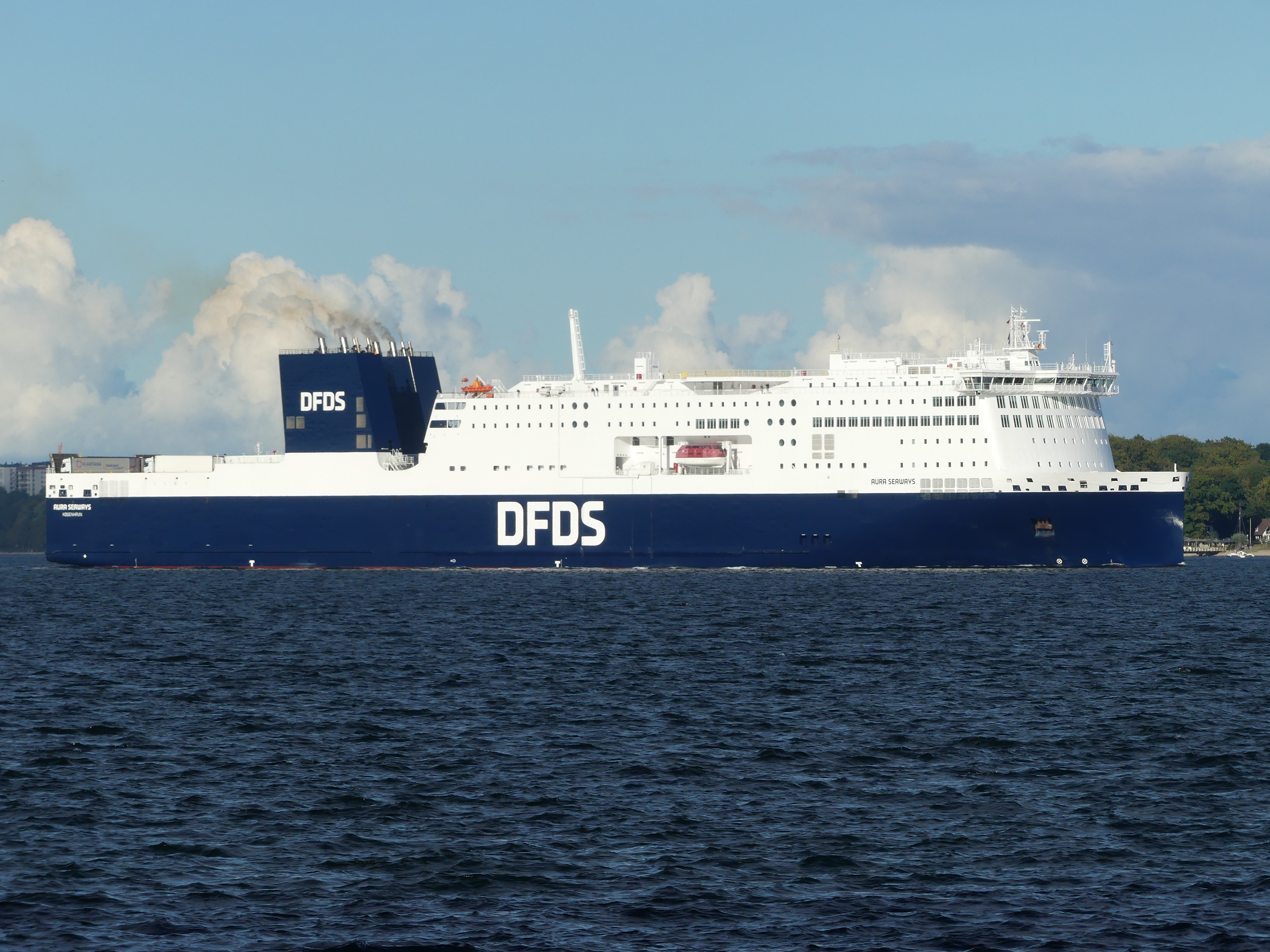
Aura Seaways in 2022

In 2018, DFDS ordered three RoPax newbuild vessels - one was an E-Flexer on charter from Stena RoRo, which entered service as the Côte d'Opale in August 2021, and two RoPaxes for Baltic Sea operations. The first of the Baltic twins, named Aura Seaways, was launched in late 2020, and had an inclination test in 2021. The sea trials took place in the middle of 2021.

=== Cancelled ferry transfers ===
In September 2019, DFDS announced that it would add two new ships, the MS Moby Wonder and MS Moby Aki, to the Newcastle–IJmuiden route in early 2020. The former ships, the MS King Seaways and MS Princess Seaways, would in turn have been sold to Moby Lines. This plan was later abandoned in October 2019 due to Moby Lines being unable to commit to the delivery of the ships with ongoing financial issues over vessel mortgages.

=== Sale of Copenhagen–Frederikshavn–Oslo route to Gotlandsbolaget ===
On 10 June 2024, DFDS announced the sale of one of its oldest lines, the mostly passenger-focused Copenhagen–Frederikshavn–Oslo, to the Swedish company Gotlandsbolaget, citing a strategic focus on transport and logistics services. The sale is expected to be completed in October 2024.

=== Expansion into Jersey ===
On 3 December 2024, it was announced that DFDS was awarded the contract to operate lifeline ferry services for Jersey from spring 2025, taking over from the pan-Channel Island operator Condor Ferries. This followed the collapse of a joint ferry tender process with Guernsey, who had chosen the majority stake-holder owner of Condor, Brittany Ferries in late October. A 20-year contract was signed on 31 December 2024 for passenger and freight services to Poole, Portsmouth and Saint-Malo. Brittany Ferries was forced to pay DFDS £40,000 in legal fees after it failed to see legal action approved for a judicial review against Jersey's decision to appoint the company as its preferred operator.

Following the launch of services on 28 March 2026, DFDS has been widely criticised due to high freight costs, service disruptions, and reduced connectivity. In August 2025, the Chief Minister of Jersey, Deputy Lyndon Farnham, issued a statement claiming the services offered by DFDS "falls short of what was promised."

In October 2025, the contract signed was released to the public following criticism.

On 6 March 2026, the States of Jersey released an interim report following a review of the current ferry service and contract. The Panel highlighted 11 key findings and made 21 recommendations in the report, which included an independent review of the flat-rate freight fee offered by DFDS, the reduction in crossing times to and from France, and proposed discussions with the States of Guernsey and other groups "to develop a long-term solution for the inter-island connections."

The lack of inter-island services to Guernsey provided by DFDS has been a source of significant backlash from local sporting clubs. A special sailing for the 2025 Muratti Vase football competition in Guernsey was put on by the DFDS using the Stena Vinga, but faced concerns over the disruption to freight services from Portsmouth, as these were cancelled as a result. Following this, a weekly Monday service was originally trialled in the summer of 2025 using the Tarifa Jet, but never resumed. A working group between the States of Guernsey, Brittany Ferries and ferry operators Islands Unlimited and Manche Îles Express was set up to improve inter-island links. DFDS and the States of Jersey were initially not included, but have since joined. In early 2026, DFDS proposed a new inter-island service using the Stena Vinga, with an outbound sailing to Guernsey on Fridays, and a return on Sundays, slotted into the scheduled Portsmouth service. This received mixed reactions and was rejected in mid-April by the States of Guernsey's Economic Development Committee due to operational issues on behalf of Guernsey Ports and the Guernsey Customs & Immigration Service.

=== Legal action with Brittany Ferries ===
In May 2025, Brittany Ferries launched legal action against DFDS. The company demanded £125 million of compensation, and submitted a complaint to the Directorate-General for Competition of the European Union over the grants that DFDS receives from the Syndicat Mixte Transmanche in Normandy for its Dieppe and Newhaven operations. Brittany Ferries stated that "significant market distortion" has contributed to losses on its Portsmouth operations.

== Routes ==
=== Baltic Sea ===
- Klaipėda⇄Fredericia
- Klaipėda⇄Karlshamn
- Klaipėda⇄Kiel
- Klaipėda⇄Køge
- Klaipėda⇄Trelleborg
- Klaipėda⇄Travemünde
- Muuga⇄Vuosaari
- Paldiski⇄Kapellskär

=== English Channel ===
- Dieppe⇄Newhaven
- Dover⇄Calais
- Dover⇄Dunkirk
- Poole⇄Jersey
- Portsmouth⇄Jersey
- Rosslare⇄Dunkirk
- Saint-Malo⇄Jersey

=== Mediterranean Sea ===
- Damietta⇄Trieste
- Marmara Ereğlisi⇄Trieste
- Marseille⇄Tunis
- Mersin⇄Trieste
- Pendik⇄Trieste
- Yalova⇄Sète
- Yalova⇄Trieste

=== North Sea ===
- Brevik⇄Ghent
- Brevik⇄Immingham
- Cuxhaven⇄Immingham
- Esbjerg⇄Immingham
- Gothenburg⇄Brevik
- Gothenburg⇄Zeebrugge
- Immingham⇄Fredrikstad
- IJmuiden⇄Newcastle
- Vlaardingen⇄Felixstowe
- Vlaardingen⇄Immingham
- Vlaardingen⇄Vilagarcía de Arousa
- Zeebrugge⇄Fredrikstad
- Zeebrugge⇄Immingham

=== Strait of Gibraltar ===
- Algeciras⇄Tanger Med
- Algeciras⇄Ceuta

== Fleet ==
DFDS Seaways operates a large fleet of cruise ferries, high-speed craft, ro-pax and ro-ro ferries. Following restructuring in 2010, all shipping activities (including those of DFDS Tor Line, DFDS Lisco and FRS Iberia/Maroc) were rebranded as DFDS Seaways.

=== Current fleet ===
Ship	Type	Built	Entered service	Route	Tonnage	Flag	IMO number	Notes	Image
Artemis Seaways	Roll-on/roll-off ferry	2005	2019	Trieste–Mersin	29,060 GT	Turkey	9293428	Renamed from UN Marmara in 2020.	
Aspendos Seaways	Roll-on/roll-off ferry	2005	2019	Trieste–Mersin	29,060 GT	Turkey	9322425	Renamed from UN Pendik in 2019.	
Assos Seaways	Roll-on/roll-off ferry	2005	2019	Trieste–Pendik	29,060 GT	Turkey	9293416	Renamed from Saffet Ullusoy in 2020.	
Athena Seaways	Roll-on/roll-off ferry	2007	2013	Dunkerque–Rosslare	24,950 GT	Lithuania	9350680		
Aura Seaways	Roll-on/roll-off ferry	2021	2021	Klaipėda–Kiel	56,043 GT	Denmark	9851036		
Begonia Seaways	Roll-on/roll-off cargo vessel	2004	2010	Gothenburg–Ghent–Odense	37,939 GT	Denmark	9262089		
Botnia Seaways	Roll-on/roll-off ferry	2000	2010	Klaipėda–Køge	11,530 GT	Lithuania	9192129		
Britannia Seaways	Roll-on/roll-off ferry	2000	2011	Immingham–Esbjerg	24,613 GT	Denmark	9153032		
Caesarea Trader	Roll-on/roll-off ferry	1996	2025	Portsmouth–Jersey Jersey–Saint-Malo	11,166 GT	United Kingdom	9117985	Former Commodore Goodwill of Condor Ferries	
Ceuta Jet	High-speed craft ferry	1998	1998	Algericas–Ceuta	2,273 GT	Cyprus	9174323		
Corbière Seaways	Roll-on/roll-off ferry	2005	2025	Portsmouth–Jersey	14,551 GT	United Kingdom	9323699	Former Stena Vinga of Stena Line	
Dardanelles Seaways	Roll-on/roll-off ferry	2006	2019	Sete–Yalova	29,060 GT	Turkey	9322437	Renamed from UN Trieste in 2019.	
Ephesus Seaways	Roll-on/roll-off ferry	2019	2019	Trieste–Pendik	60,465 GT	Turkey	9816830		
Ficaria Seaways	Roll-on/roll-off ferry	2006	2010	Gothenburg–Immingham–Brevik	37,939 GT	Denmark	9320568		
Flandria Seaways	Roll-on/roll-off ferry	2020	2020	Gothenburg–Zeebrugge	60,465 GT	Denmark	9860142		
Freesia Seaways	Roll-on/roll-off ferry	2004	2010	Gothenburg–Immingham	37,939 GT	Denmark	9274848		
Galata Seaways	Roll-on/roll-off ferry	2010	2019	Trieste–Mersin	34,215 GT	Turkey	9422134	Renamed from Cemil Bayülgen in 2020.	
Gallipoli Seaways	Roll-on/roll-off ferry	2001	2019	Sète–Yalova	26,525 GT	Turkey	9215476		
Hollandia Seaways	Roll-on/roll-off cargo vessel	2019	2019	Vlaardingen–Immingham	60,465 GT	Denmark	9832585		
Humbria Seaways	Roll-on/roll-off cargo vessel	2020	2020	Gothenburg–Ghent	60,465 GT	Denmark	9832597		
Kattegat	Roll-on/roll-off ferry	1996	1996	Algeciras–Tanger Med	14,221 GT	Cyprus	9112765		
King Seaways	Cruiseferry	1987	2006	IJmuiden–Newcastle	31,395 GT	Denmark	8502406		
Levante Jet	High-speed craft ferry	2015	2021	Poole–Jersey	5,537 GT	United Kingdom	9722819		
Luna Seaways	Roll-on/roll-off ferry	2021	2022	Klaipėda–Karlshamn	56,043 GT	Denmark	9851048		
Magnolia Seaways	Roll-on/roll-off ferry	2003	2010	Cuxhaven–Immingham	32,523 GT	Denmark	9259496		
Myra Seaways	Roll-on/roll-off ferry	2009	2019	Sete–Izmir	34,236 GT	Turkey	9422122		
Olympos Seaways	Roll-on/roll-off ferry	2002	2019	Trieste–Mersin	26,525 GT	Turkey	9242390	Renamed from UND Birlik in 2019.	
Optima Seaways	Roll-on/roll-off ferry	1999	2010	Klaipėda–Kiel	25,206 GT	Lithuania	9188427		
Patria Seaways	Roll-on/roll-off ferry	1992	2004	Klaipėda–Karlshamn	18,332 GT	Lithuania	8917390		
Pergamon Seaways	Roll-on/roll-off ferry	2013	2019	Trieste–Patras	31,595 GT	Turkey	9506277	Renamed from UN Istanbul in 2020.	
Petunia Seaways	Roll-on/roll-off ferry	2004	2010	Gothenburg–Ghent	32,523 GT	Denmark	9259501		
Primula Seaways	Roll-on/roll-off ferry	2004	2010	Gothenburg–Ghent–Brevik	37,985 GT	Denmark	9259513		
Princess Seaways	Cruiseferry	1986	2006	IJmuiden–Newcastle	31,360 GT	Denmark	8502391		
Regina Seaways	Roll-on/roll-off ferry	2010	2011	Klaipėda–Karlshamn	25,518 GT	Lithuania	9458535		
Scandia Seaways	Roll-on/roll-off ferry	2021	2021	Vlaardingen–Immingham	60,465 GT	Denmark	9864681		
Selandia Seaways	Roll-on/roll-off ferry	1998	2010	Cuxhaven–Immingham	24,803 GT	Denmark	9157284		
Sirena Seaways	Roll-on/roll-off ferry	2002	2013	Paldiski–Kapellskär	22,382 GT	Lithuania	9212163		
Suecia Seaways	Roll-on/roll-off ferry	1999	2011	Felixstowe–Vlaardingen	24,613 GT	Denmark	9153020		
Sumela Seaways	Roll-on/roll-off ferry	2008	2019	Sete–Topcular	34,236 GT	Turkey	9356749		
Tanger Express	Roll-on/roll-off ferry	1996	1996	Algeciras–Tanger Med	14,221 GT	Cyprus			
Tarifa Jet	High-speed craft ferry	1997	2006	Saint-Malo–Jersey	5,007 GT	United Kingdom	9150099		
Troy Seaways	Roll-on/roll-off ferry	2019	2019	Trieste–Pendik	60,465 GT	Turkey	9816842		
Victoria Seaways	Roll-on/roll-off ferry	2009	2010	Dunkerque–Rosslare	25,518 GT	Lithuania	9350721		
Zeugma Seaways	Roll-on/roll-off ferry	2008	2019	Sete–Topcular	34,236 GT	Turkey	9356737	Renamed from UN Akdenizn in 2020.	
DFDS Seaways France
Côte d'Albâtre	Roll-on/roll-off ferry	2005	2006	Dieppe–Newhaven	18,564 GT	France	9320128	Operated under the Transmanche Ferries brand	
Côte des Dunes	Roll-on/roll-off ferry	2001	2016	Dover–Calais	33,796 GT	France	9232527		
Côte des Flandres	Roll-on/roll-off ferry	2005	2016	Dover–Calais	33,796 GT	France	9305843		
Côte d'Opale	Roll-on/roll-off ferry	2020	2021	Dover–Calais	40,331 GT	France	9858321		
Delft Seaways	Roll-on/roll-off ferry	2006	2010	Dover–Dunkerque	35,923 GT	Great Britain	9293088		
Dover Seaways	Roll-on/roll-off ferry	2006	2010	Dover–Dunkerque	35,923 GT	Great Britain	9318345		
Dunkerque Seaways	Roll-on/roll-off ferry	2005	2010	Dover–Dunkerque	35,923 GT	Great Britain	9293076		
Seven Sisters	Roll-on/roll-off ferry	2006	2006	Dieppe–Newhaven	18,564 GT	France	9320130	Operated under the Transmanche Ferries brand	

=== Future fleet ===
Ship	Type	Built	To enter service	Route	Tonnage	Flag	IMO number	Notes	Image
Ciudad de Valencia	Roll-on/roll-off ferry	2020	2026	Klaipėda⇄Karlshamn	32.581 GT	Italy	9869722	Chartered from Trasmediterránea	
Volcan de Tamasite	Roll-on/roll-off ferry	2004	TBC	Algericas–Ceuta Algericas–Tanger Med	17.343 GT	Spain	9281322	Purchased from Naviera Armas	

=== Former ships ===
Ship	In service	Tonnage	Status
MS Skipper Clement	1964–1976	2,964 GRT	Scrapped 2010.
MS Akershus	1965–1973	5,012 GRT	Burnt and sunk 1989.
MS Winston Churchill	1967–1996	8,657 GRT	Scrapped 2004.
MS Kong Olav V	1968–1984	7,965 GRT	Burnt 1993, later scrapped.
MS Prinsesse Margrethe	1968–1983	7,965 GRT	Scrapped 2005.
MS Aalborghus; MS Dana Sirena; MS Dana Corona	1969–1971; 1971–1978; 1978–1985	7,697 GRT; 7,988 GRT	Scrapped in China, 2000.
MS Trekroner; MS Dana Corona; MS Dana Sirena	1970–1971; 1971–1979; 1979–1983	7,692 GRT	Sunk 1994.
MS Dana Regina	1974–1990	10,002 GRT	Since 1998 MS Vana Tallinn with Tallink. The ship was scrapped at Aliga, Turkey in 2014.
MS Dana Anglia; MS Duke of Scandinavia	1978–2002; 2002–2006	14,399 GRT; 15,589 GT	Since 2009 MS Moby Corse with Moby Lines.
MS Dana Gloria; MS King of Scandinavia	1981–1984, 1986–1989; 1989–1994	12,348 GRT; 20,581 GT	2006-2017 MS Jupiter for Royal Group Ltd. Sunk 2017.
MS Tor Scandinavia; MS Princess of Scandinavia	1981–1991; 1991–2006	15,673 GRT; 21,545 GT	Since 2006 MS Moby Otta with Moby Lines.
MS Scandinavia	1982–1985	26,747 GT	Since 2002 MS Island Escape with Island Cruises.
MS Tor Britannia; MS Prince of Scandinavia	1982–1990; 1990–2003	14,905 GRT; 21,545 GT	Since 2003 MS Moby Drea with Moby Lines.
MS Hamburg; MS Admiral of Scandinavia	1987–1997; 1997–2002	19,292 GT	Originally MS Kronprins Harald with Jahre Line (1976-1987); Since 2002 MS Caribbean Express with Access Ferries; Scrapped 2011 in India.
MS Duchess of Scandinavia	2003–2005	16,794 GT	From 2008 to 2014 MS Bergensfjord with Fjord Line. To be renamed Oslofjord 2014.
MS Dieppe Seaways	2012–2014	29,800 GT	Sold to Stena Line in Nov 2014. Renamed MS Stena Superfast X. Entered Service 09/03/2015.
MS Calais Seaways	2013-2021	28,883 GT	Sold to Irish Ferries in November 2021. Renamed Isle of Innisfree.
MS Crown Seaways	1994-2024	35,498 GT	Sold to Gotlandsbolaget New name Nordic Crown
MS Pearl Seaways	2001-2024	40,022 GT	Sold to Gotlandsbolaget. New name Nordic Pearl
Finlandia Seaways	2010-2025	11,530 GT	Scrapped in 2025.
Cappadocia Seaways	2018-2025	26,525 GT	Sold in 2025

== Accidents and incidents ==
=== Victoria Seaways 2013 fire ===
On 23 April 2013, Victoria Seaways caught fire whilst on passage between Kiel, Germany and Klaipėda, Lithuania. The fire was discovered on the main vehicle deck at around midnight on the 22/23 April. The ship's fire-extinguishing system took control of the fire quickly, and passengers were sent to muster stations whilst the fire was put out. The ship continued to Klaipėda shortly after. The cause of the incident is unknown.

=== Sirena Seaways 2013 dock collision ===
On 22 June 2013, Sirena Seaways, with 489 passengers on board, collided with the dockside at Harwich, Essex. The incident caused damage to the dockside, the loading ramp and the ship, resulting in the vessel taking on water. The crew blocked the opening from inside and the watertight compartments were used to prevent the ship from capsizing. The Harwich RNLI lifeboat, Walton Coastguard rescue team and an RAF search and rescue helicopter from Wattisham Airfield responded to the incident, along with a number of other vessels nearby. The ferry was brought alongside at 14:45 and the passengers were disembarked. The cause of the collision is unknown.

=== Britannia Seaways 2013 fire ===
On Saturday 16 November 2013, Britannia Seaways caught fire in the North Sea, trapping 32 crew on board. Helicopters despatched from Norway were unable to take the crew off the ship, owing to bad weather conditions. The fire began in a container on one of the upper decks, and was extinguished 13 hours after it broke out. The ship was carrying military equipment to Norway for a military exercise, and reached Bergen a few days later. No injuries were reported. The cause of the fire is unknown and under investigation.

=== Corona Seaways 2013 fire ===
On 4 December 2013, at 02:30, Corona Seaways caught fire whilst the vessel was travelling from Fredericia to Copenhagen. The fire broke out in the main closed deck, and was briefly under control with the ships sprinkler systems before flaring up again. The ship arrived at Helsingborg at 07.00, where the fire was extinguished by the local fire services. No injuries were reported amongst the 10 passengers and 19 crew members. The cause of the fire is unknown and under investigation.

=== King Seaways 2013 fire ===
On 28 December 2013, a cabin aboard the ferry King Seaways caught fire while it was approximately 30 miles off Flamborough Head whilst travelling to IJmuiden, the Netherlands. The fire started at 22:45 GMT on Saturday and was extinguished within 15 minutes. RAF rescue helicopters from RAF Boulmer and RAF Leconfield winched two passengers and four crew off the ship. The vessel returned to North Shields on Sunday morning. The cause is still under investigation however two people have been arrested in connection with the fire. One was subsequently charged with arson reckless to endangering life, and affray. On 8 July 2014 it was reported that one of them had pleaded guilty in Newcastle Crown Court to a charge of arson being reckless as to whether life was endangered.

=== Crown Seaways 2014 engine incident ===
On 27 April 2014, Crown Seaways experienced engine problems near the Danish island of Anholt, whilst travelling between Copenhagen and Oslo. It is reported that passengers heard a loud bang, a shudder and smoke at about 21:30, when the vessel suffered an engine failure and crank explosion. The ship soon continued on its way towards Oslo. The cause of the incident is unknown.

=== Dover Seaways 2014 dock collision ===
On 10 November 2014, Dover Seaways collided with a harbour wall at the Port of Dover, shortly after leaving the port at 08:00. The ship was heading to Dunkirk carrying 320 passengers. Several passengers were treated with minor injuries, and four were taken to hospital for additional treatment. The cause of the collision is unknown.

=== City of Rotterdam / Primula 2015 collision ===
The City of Rotterdam car carrier collided with Primula Seaways in the Humber estuary in December 2015.

== Closure of the Harwich–Esbjerg route ==
The Harwich–Esbjerg route was closed on 29 September 2014 due to a decline in passenger numbers. The Harwich–Esbjerg route had operated since 1875. This was the last service operated by DFDS from Harwich and was also the last passenger service between Great Britain and Denmark; DFDS continue to operate freight services from Immingham to Denmark. DFDS Seaways reported that MS Sirena Seaways will move on other duties on the route between Kapellskar, Sweden and Paldiski, Estonia. A petition has been set up to attempt to show DFDS that there is a demand for the route.
