= Kapellskär =

Sea port in Sweden

Coordinates: 59°43′17″N 019°03′53″E

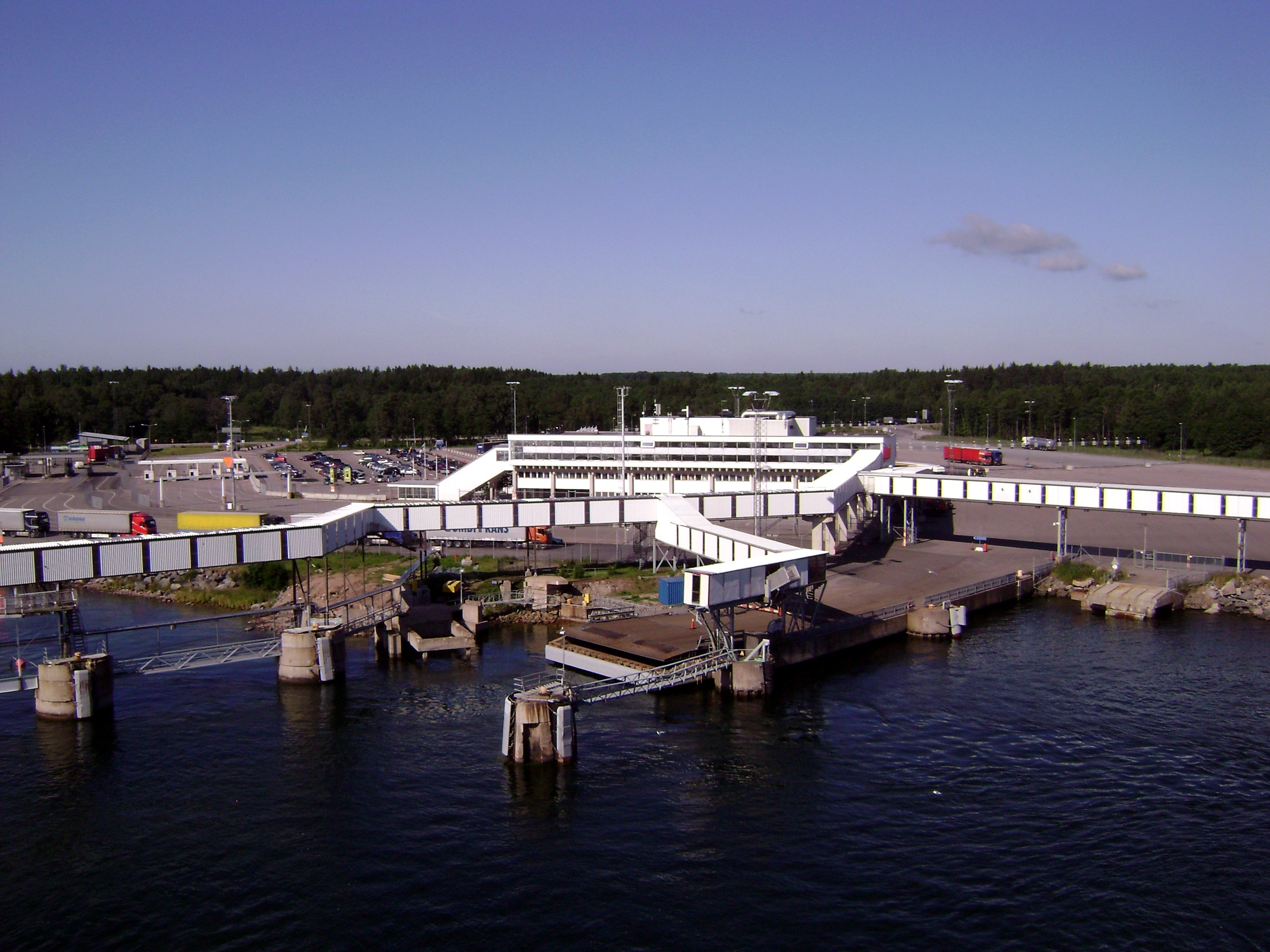
Kapellskär port from MS Finnfellow.

Kapellskär (Swedish pronunciation: [ˈkâpːɛlˌɧæːr]) is a port about 90 kilometres (60 mi) north of Stockholm, in Sweden. It is located by the Baltic Sea, in Norrtälje Municipality, Stockholm County.

== Services ==
The port was served by frequent passenger ferry services to Mariehamn, Åland, Finland, operated by Viking Line, with three services per day and direction during peak season, until January 8,2023. Now there are services to Naantali in mainland Finland, calling at Långnäs port in Åland, operated by Finnlines, and to Paldiski in Estonia operated by DFDS Seaways.

== Ships serving the terminal ==
Company	Ship	Route
(Finland) Finnlines	MS Finncanopus	Kapellskär – Långnäs – Naantali
(Finland) Finnlines	MS Finnsirius	Kapellskär – Långnäs – Naantali
(Denmark) DFDS Seaways	MS Sirena Seaways	Kapellskär – Paldiski
