= Tarifa Jet =

Catamaran ferry built in 1997

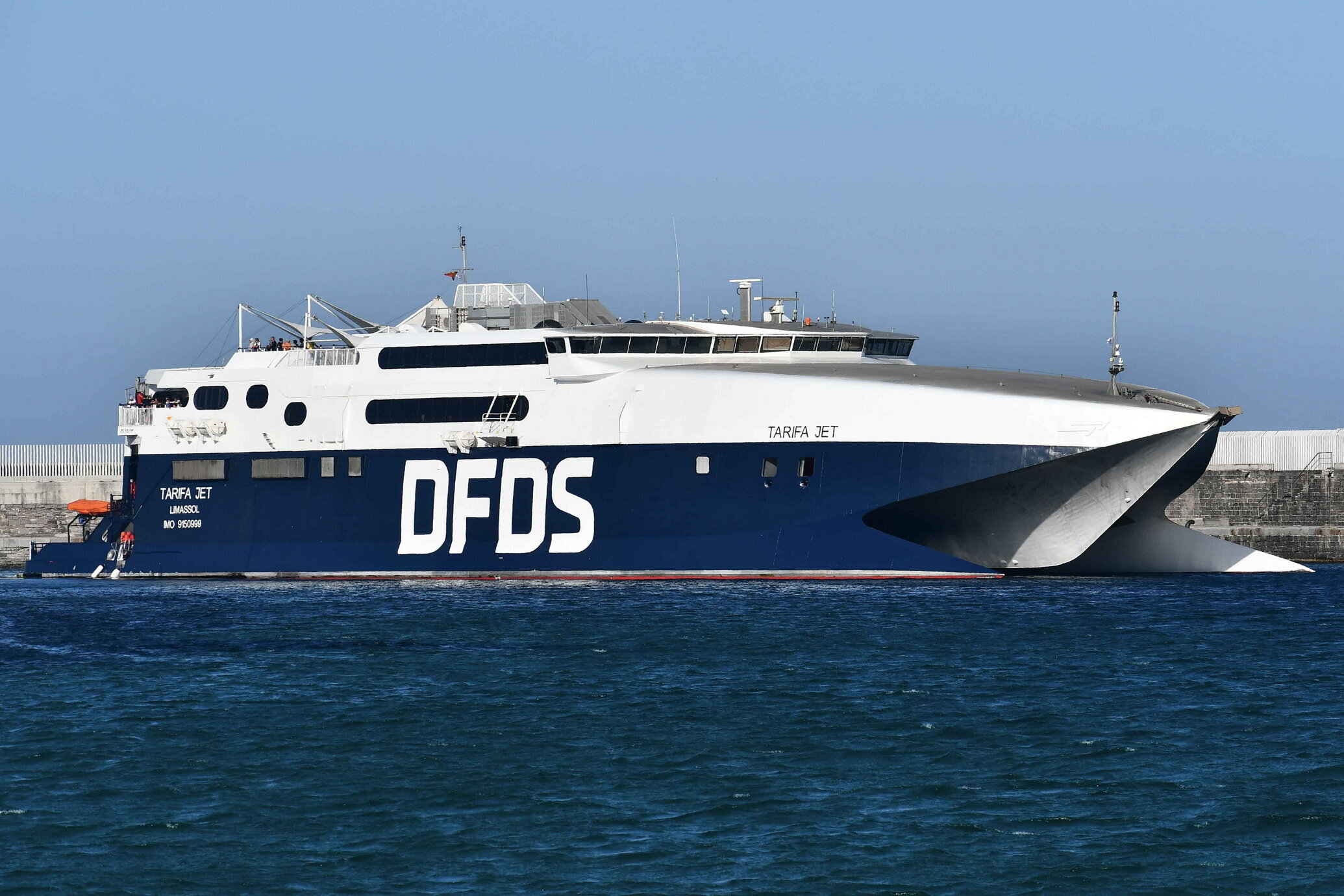
- Tarifa Jet in Tarifa

History
- Name: 1997: Incat 043; 1997–2004: Sicilia Jet; 2004–2005: Sardinia Jet; 2005–2006: Pescara Jet; 2006–present: Tarifa Jet
- Owner: 1997–2006: SNAV; 2006–2024: FRS Iberia/Maroc; 2024–present: DFDS Seaways
- Operator: 1997–2006: SNAV; 2006–2024: FRS Iberia/Maroc; 2024–present: DFDS Seaways
- Port of registry: Dover, United Kingdom
- Route: St Malo ⇄ Jersey
- Builder: Incat, Tasmania, Australia
- Yard number: 043
- Launched: 8 February 1997
- Completed: 1997
- Identification: IMO number: 9150999

General characteristics
- Tonnage: 5,007 GT
- Length: 86.62 m (284 ft 2 in)
- Beam: 26 m (85 ft 4 in)
- Draft: 3.63 m (11 ft 11 in)
- Installed power: 4 × Ruston 20RK270 (28320 kW total)
- Speed: up to 42 knots (78 km/h; 48 mph)
- Capacity: 800 passengers; 175 vehicles
- Crew: 18

Tarifa Jet is a high-speed catamaran ferry owned and operated by DFDS Seaways. Built in 1997, she originally operated across Southern Europe with SNAV under three names, and later FRS Iberia/Maroc under her current name. She currently operates between Saint-Malo, France and Jersey in the Channel Islands.

== History ==
Built in 1997 by Incat in Tasmania, Australia as Incat 043, the vessel was first delivered in May 1997.

=== SNAV ===
Incat 043 was sold in 1997 to Italian operator SNAV as Sicilia Jet. Throughout its latter years with SNAV, the vessel was renamed twice, first as Sardinia Jet and lastly as Pescara Jet.

=== FRS ===
In 2006, the vessel was sold to FRS Iberia/Maroc and was renamed Tarifa Jet.

=== DFDS Seaways ===
In 2024, DFDS Seaways acquired FRS Iberia/Maroc.

Following the decision in Jersey to appoint DFDS as their new operator, Tarifa Jet was redeployed on Saint Malo to Jersey sailings from spring 2025.

In June 2025, DFDS began a weekly Monday inter-island service between Jersey and Guernsey using the Tarifa Jet. Services were often cancelled, and subsequently, timetables published after October omitted the service, and it did not resume.

== Layout ==
The catamaran has an overall length of 86.62 meters, a beam of 26.00 m and a draft of 3.62 m, the gross tonnage amounts 4.995 GT. The machinery consists of four Ruston 20RK270 engines with a total output of 28320 kW (38,500 HP) allowing a maximum service speed of 42 knots (78 km/h; 48 mph). 800 passengers and 185 cars can be accommodated on board; the car deck is accessed via two stern ramps.

== Accidents and incidents ==
On 29 March 2026, Tarifa Jet struck the eastern linkspan in St Helier Harbour, Jersey. The ferry lost power shortly after, and her stern was damaged. No one was injured.

== Sister ships ==
- Champion Jet 1
- Champion Jet 2
- Champion Jet 3
