= Sado Steam Ship =

Transportation Company

Sado Steam Ship Co., Ltd.
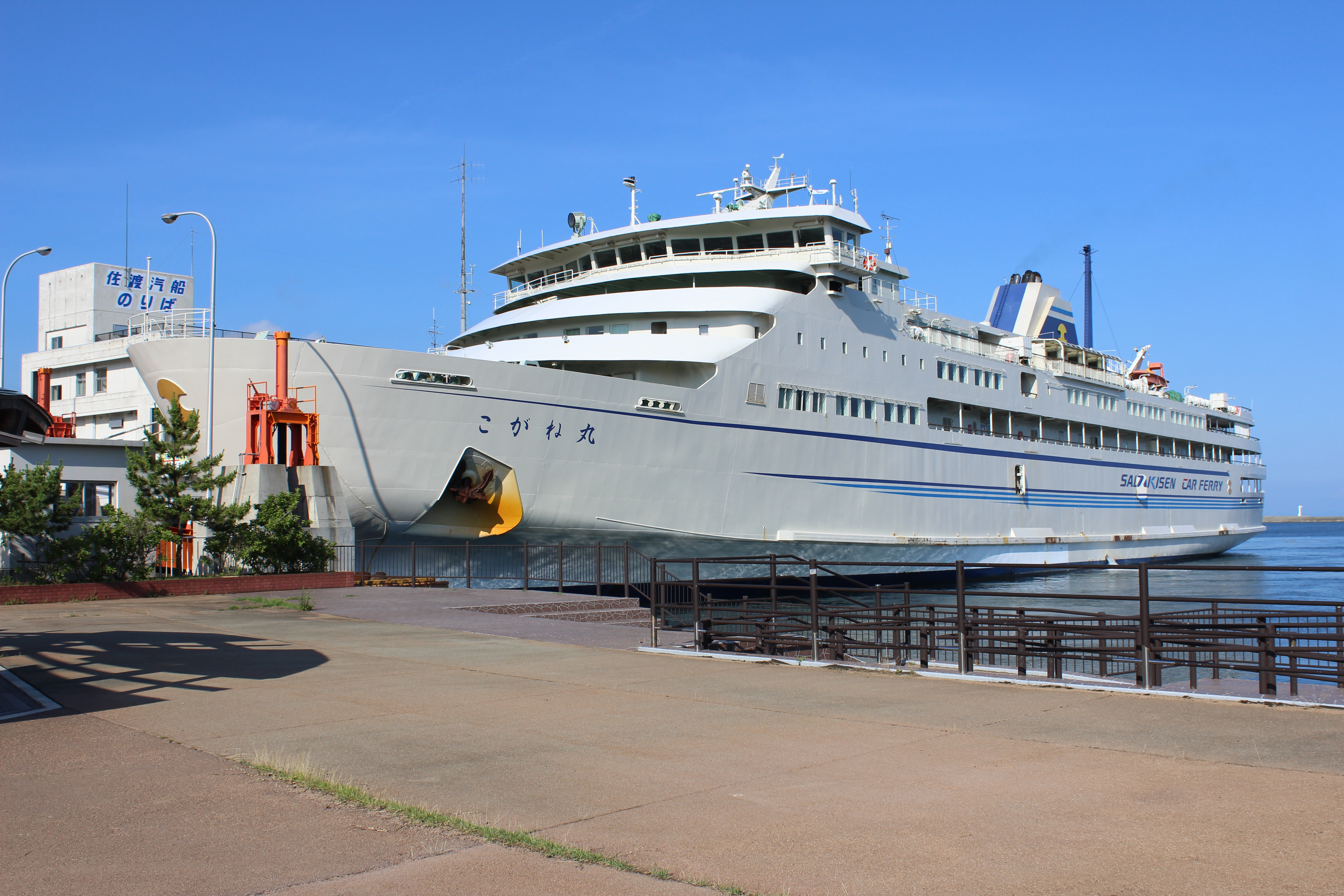
- Native name: 佐渡汽船株式会社
- Type: Corporation
- Industry: Public Transportation
- Founded: February 3, 1913
- Headquarters: Sado, Japan
- Area served: Niigata Prefecture
- Parent: Michinori Holdings (66.54%); Niigata Prefecture (10.72%); Sado, Niigata (3.52%)
- Website: www.sadokisen.co.jp/language/en/

Sado Steam Ship Co., Ltd. (佐渡汽船株式会社, Sado Kisen Kabushiki-gaisha) is a marine transportation company based in Sado, Niigata, Japan, it was founded as Sado Shosen on February 3, 1913. In 1932, the modern version of the company was established through the merger of three ferry companies; Sado Shosen, Etsusa Shosen and Niigata Kisen into Sado Kisen as a joint public-private venture. This was the first example of this kind of joint public-private venture in Japan. On March 31, 2022, 66.54% of this company's shares were transferred to Michinori Holdings, transferring overall ownership to that company.

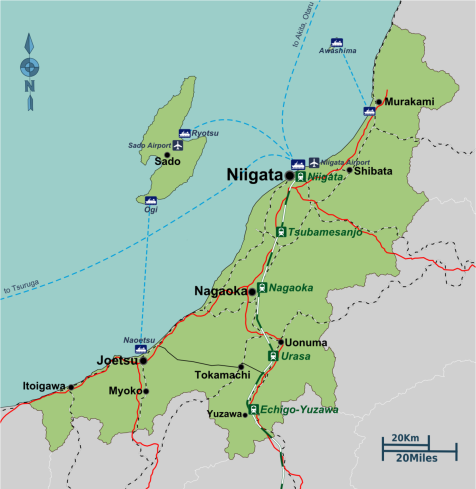
Routes connecting the mainland to Sado Island

== Routes ==
Sado Steam Ship provide two regular timetabled services between Niigata Prefecture and Sado Island.

- Niigata – Ryōtsu
- Naoetsu – Ogi (Spring to Autumn)

=== Former routes ===
- Teradomari – Akadomari (ended 2018)

== Terminals ==
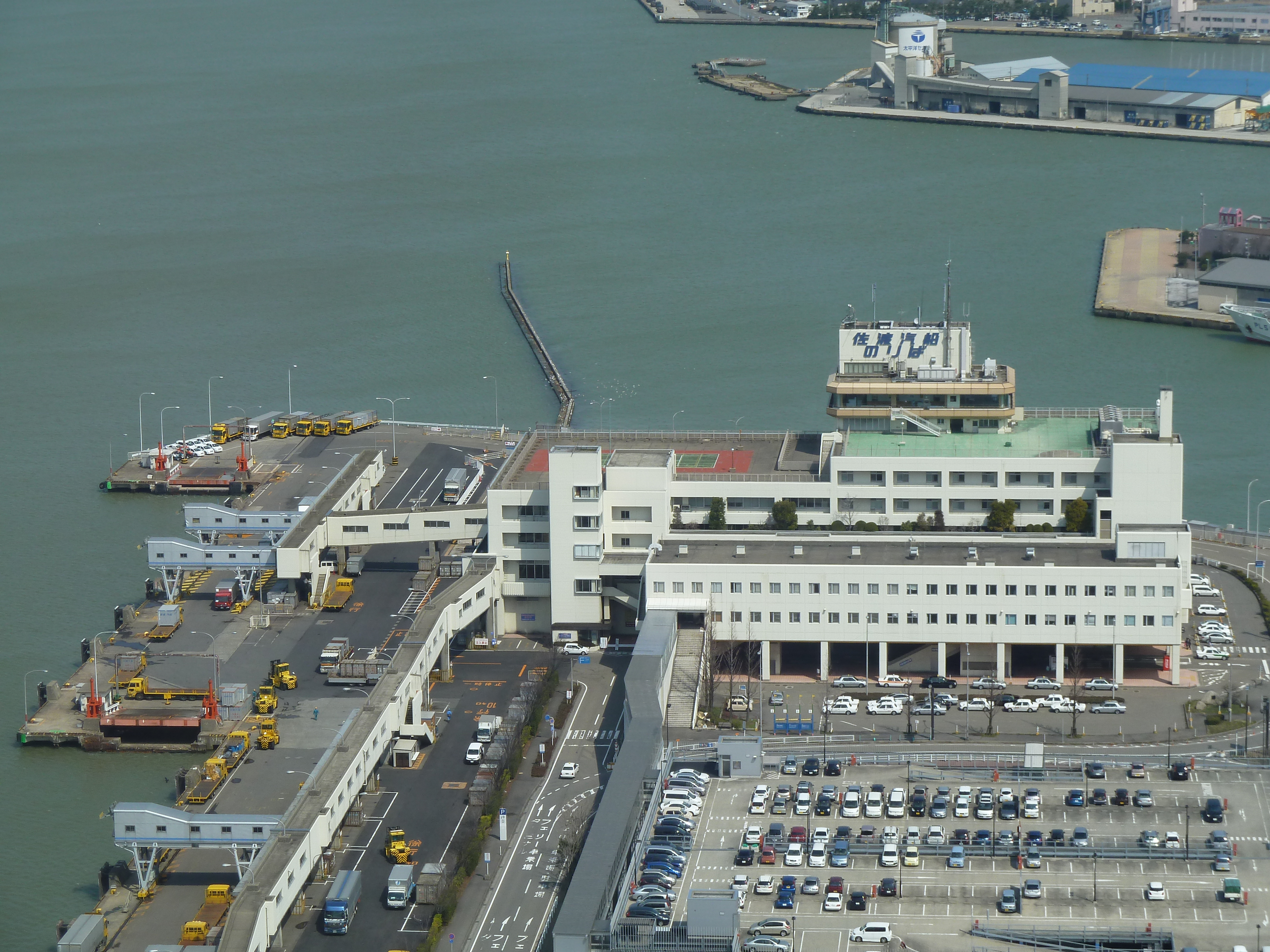
Niigata port terminal

Sado Steam Ship operates from six terminals.

Niigata port terminal
Located in Chūō-ku, Niigata (37.9298°N 139.0622°E)

Naoetsu port terminal
Located in Jōetsu (37.1825°N 138.2508°E)

Teradomari port terminal
Located in Nagaoka (37.6404°N 138.7624°E)

Ryotsu port terminal
Located in Sado (38.0816°N 138.4382°E)

Ogi port terminal
Located in Sado (37.8162°N 138.2824°E)

Akadomari port terminal
Located in Sado (37.8666°N 138.4123°E)

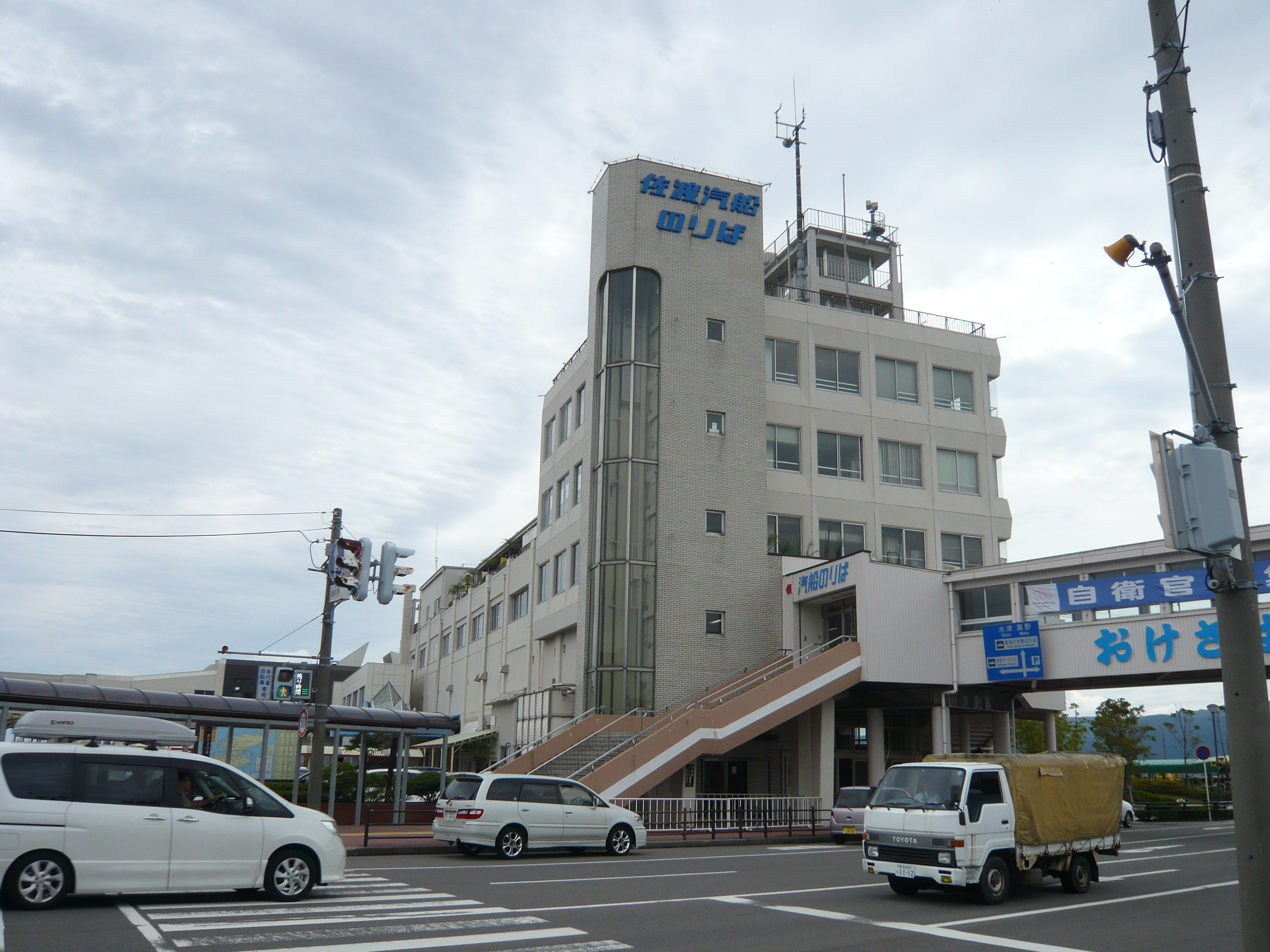
Ryotsu port terminal

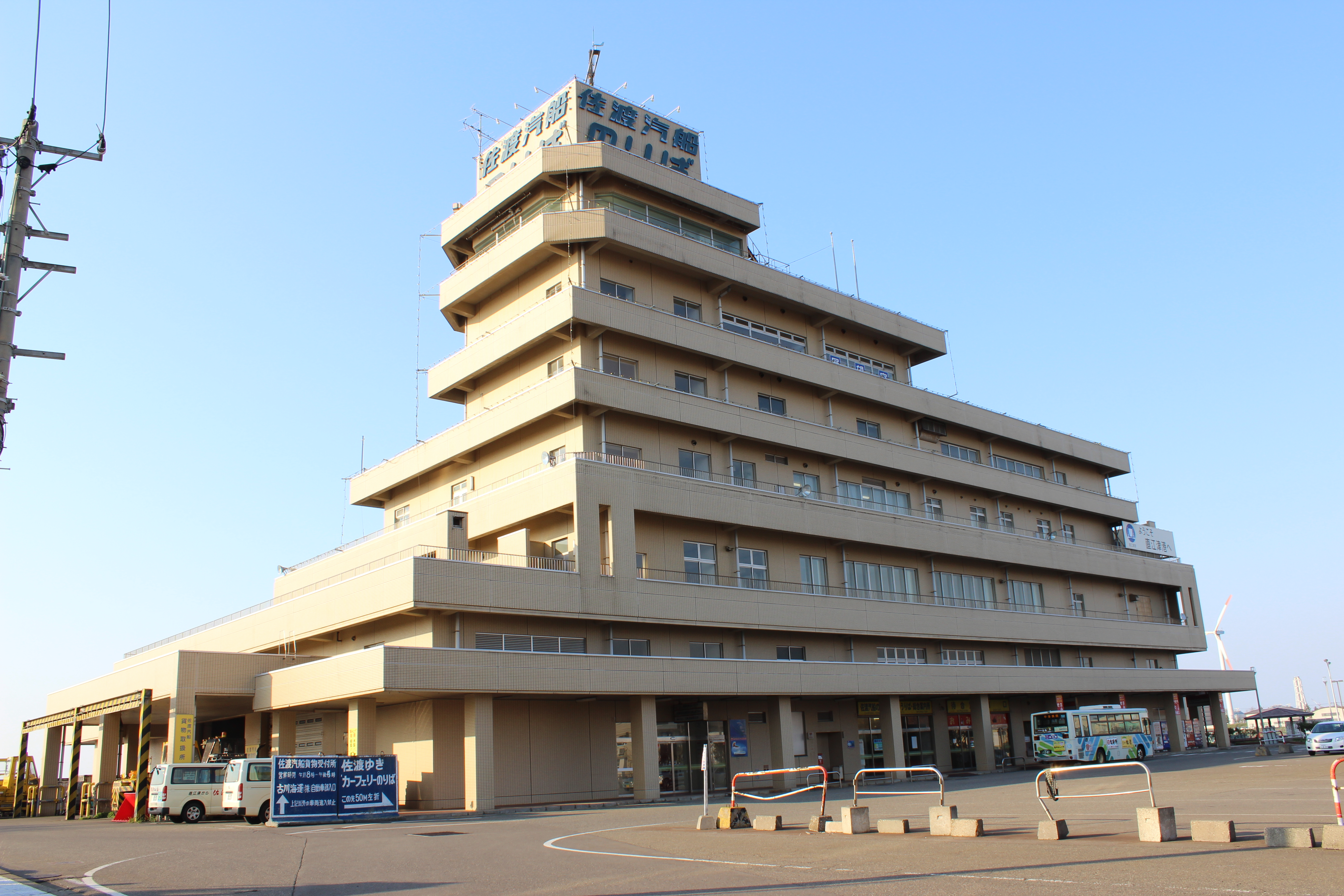
Naoetsu port terminal

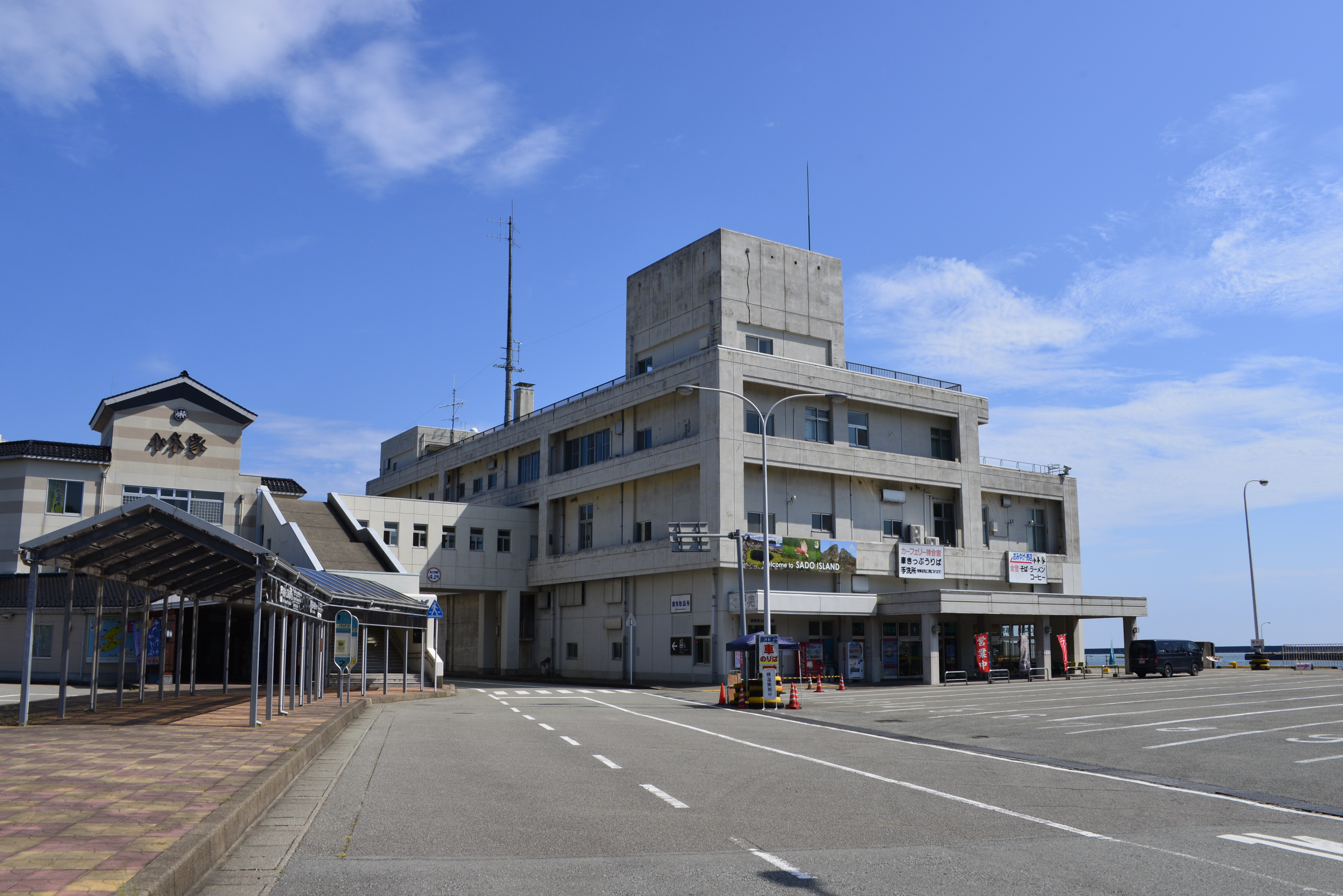
Ogi port terminal

== Fleet ==
As of December 2016, the following ships are in service.

Name	Type	Gross tonnage	Speed	Passenger capacity	Route	In service from
Ginga	Jetfoil	-	47 kn	250	Niigata	1986
Tsubasa	Jetfoil	-	47 kn	250	Niigata	1989
Suisei	Jetfoil	-	47 kn	250	Niigata	1991
Tokiwa-maru	Car ferry	5,380 t	19.1 kn	1,500	Niigata	2014
Okesa-maru	Car ferry	5,862 t	23.4 kn	1,705	Niigata	1993
Akane	High-speed car ferry	5,702 t	30 kn	628	Naoetsu	2015
Aibisu	High-speed ferry	263 t	25 kn	216	Teradomari	2005

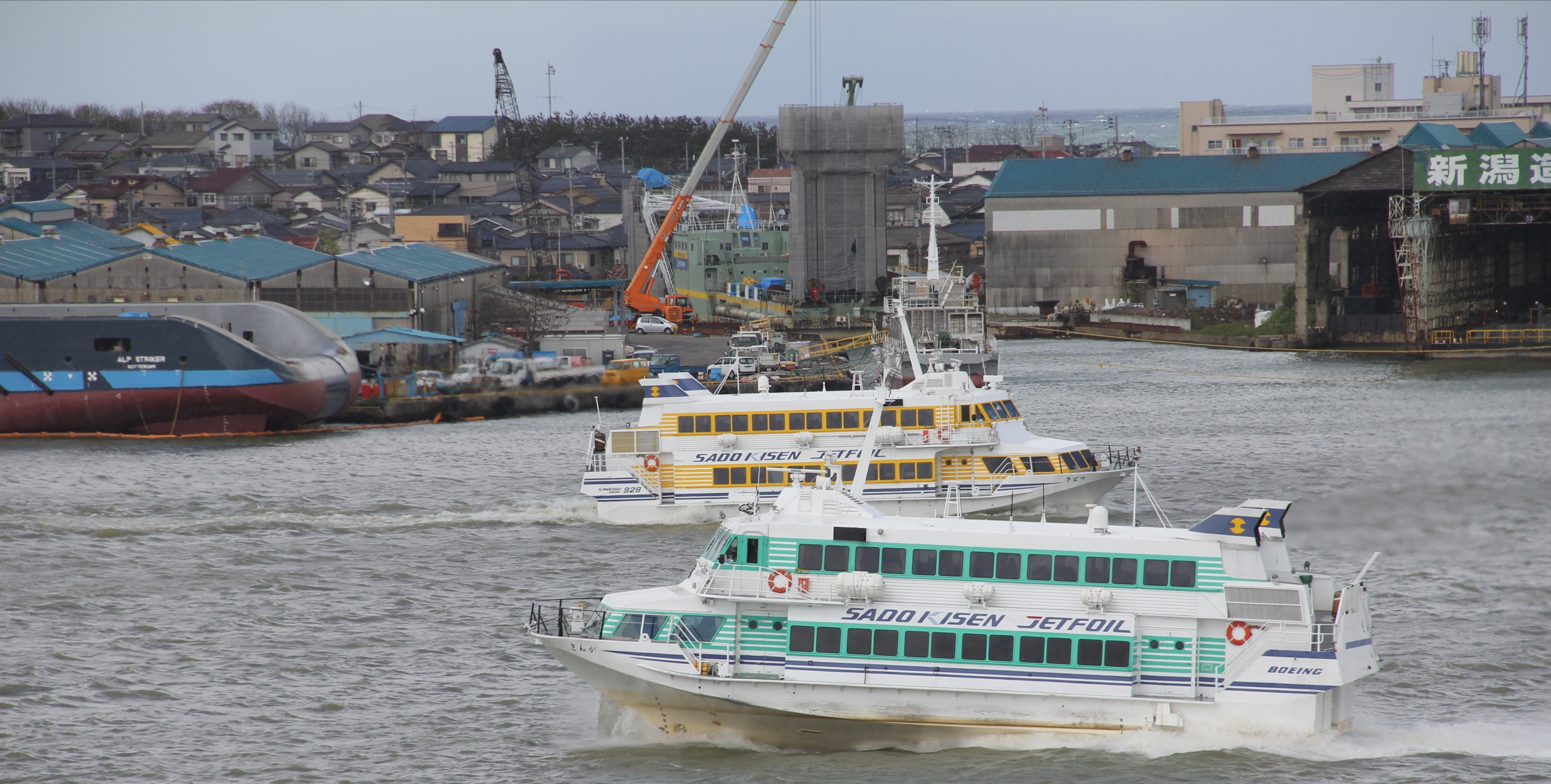
Ginga and Tsubasa

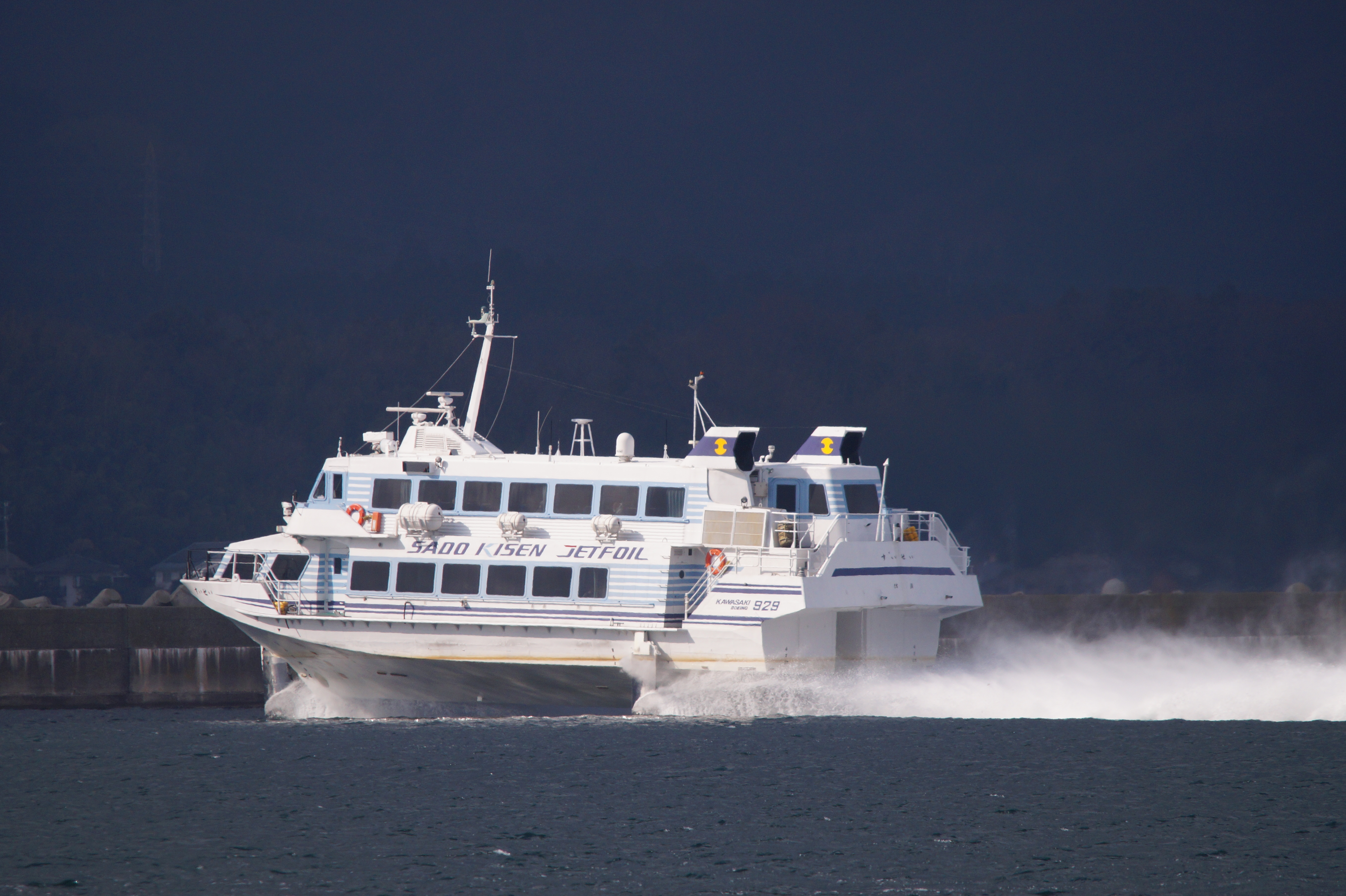
Suisei

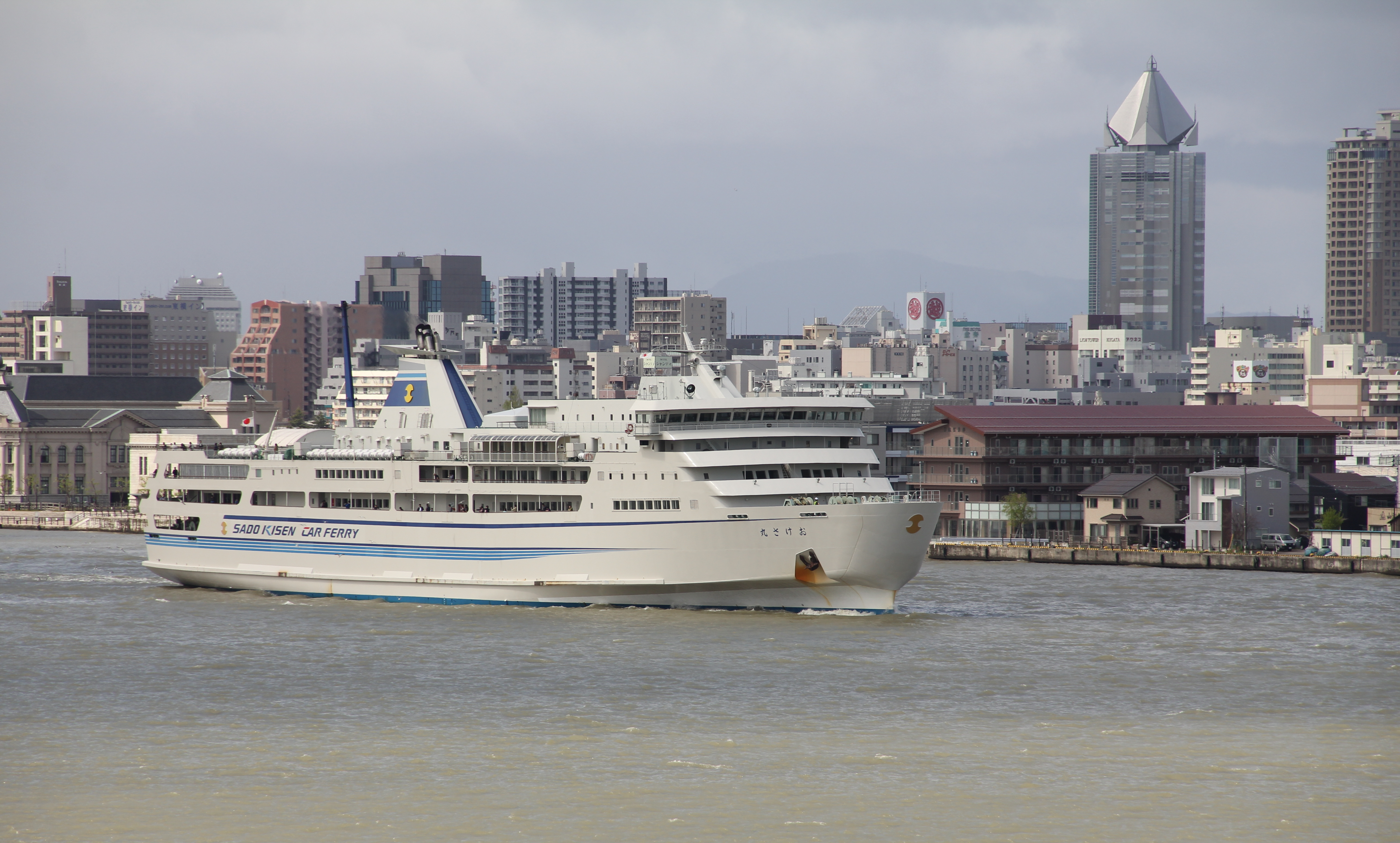
Okesa-maru

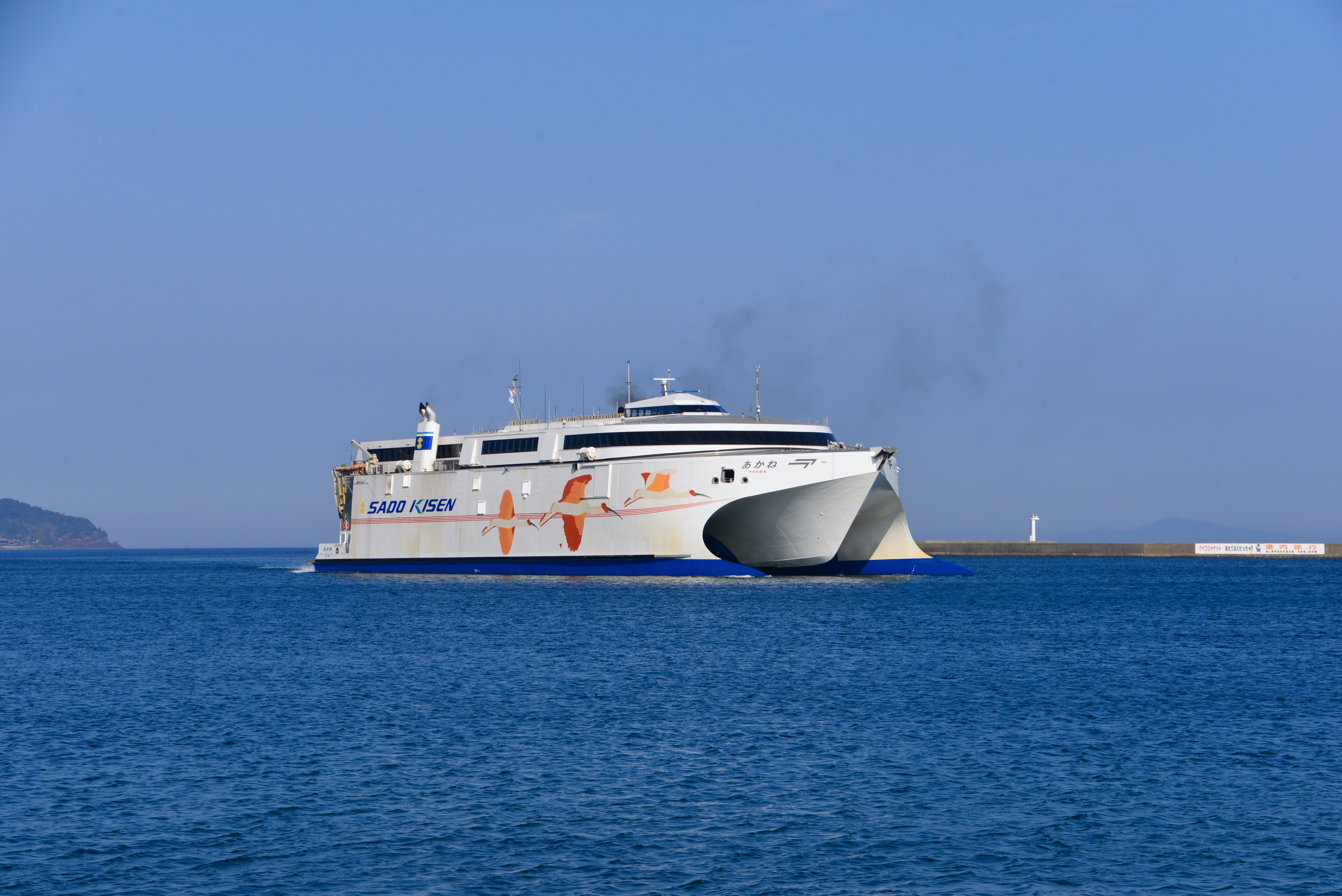
Akane

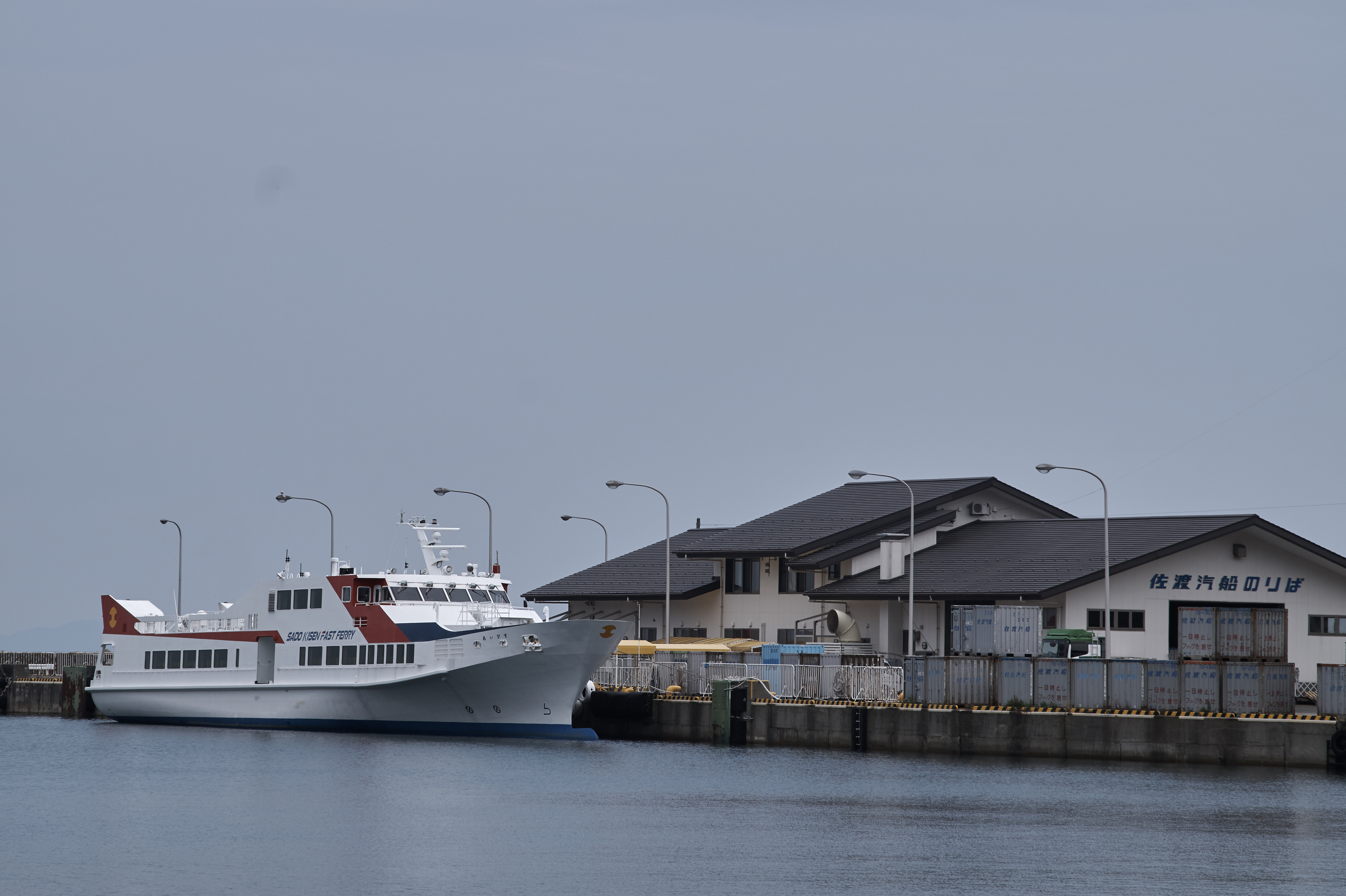
Aibisu
