= Algeciras Jet =

Fast ferry built in Norway

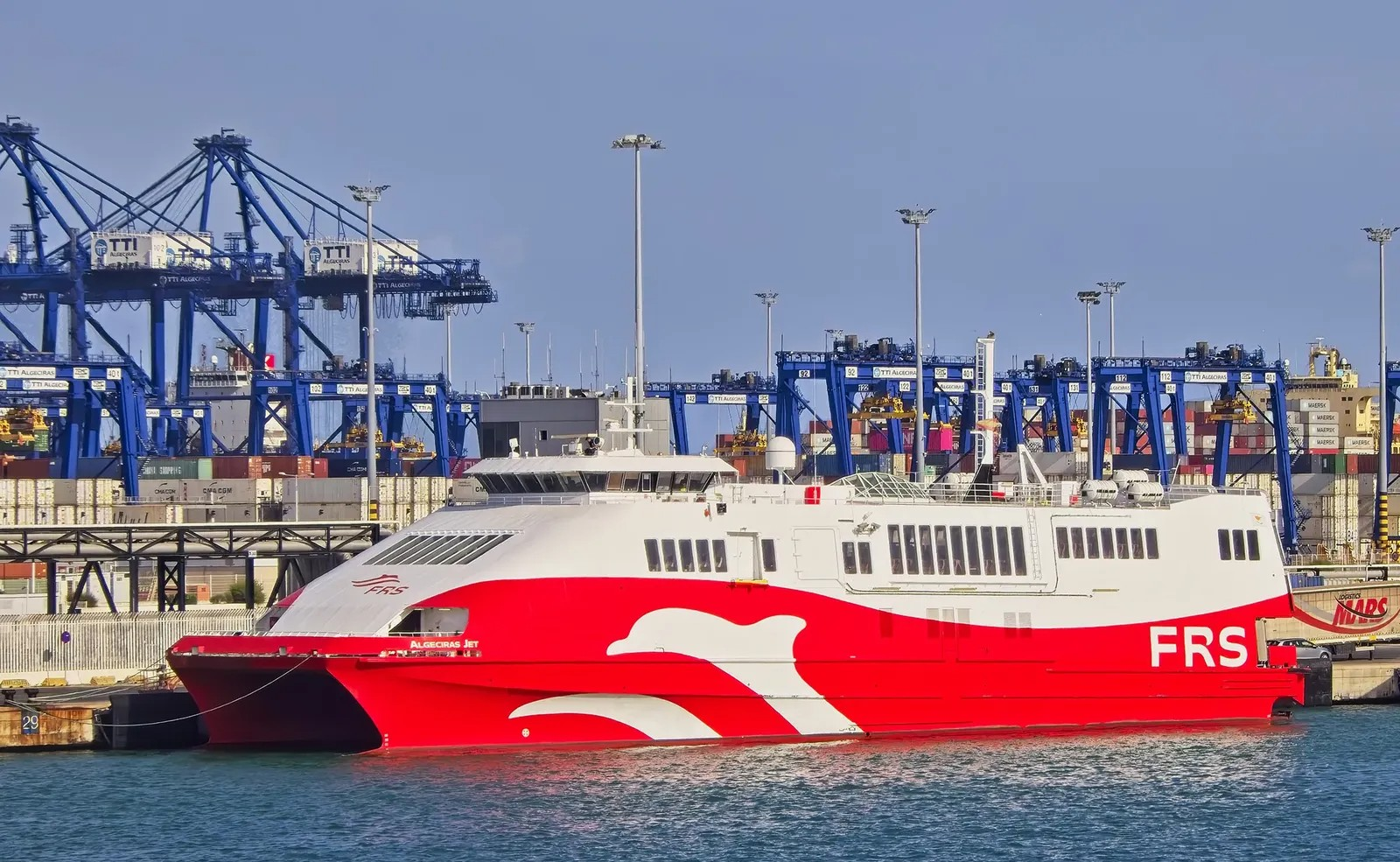
- Algeciras Jet in Algeciras

History
- Name: 1999–2008: Baltic Jet; 2008–2024: Algeciras Jet; 2024–2025: Ruby Express; 2025–present: Algeciras Jet
- Owner: 1999–2008: Nordic Jet Line; 2008–2024: FRS Iberia; 2024–present: FRS L'Express des Îles
- Operator: 1999–2008: Nordic Jet Line; 2008–2024: FRS Iberia; 2024–present: FRS L'Express des Îles
- Port of registry: 1999–2008: Bergen, Norway; 2008–2024: Limassol, Cyprus; 2024–2025: Pointe-à-Pitre, Guadeloupe; 2025–present: Limassol, Cyprus
- Route: Former: Pointe-à-Pitre – Roseau – Fort-de-France – Castries; Former: Algeciras – Ceuta; Former: Tarifa – Tanger-Ville; Former: Helsinki – Tallinn
- Ordered: 1998
- Builder: Kværner Fjellstrand; Omastrand, Norway
- Yard number: 1649
- Laid down: 5 June 1998
- Launched: 7 March 1999
- Completed: 7 May 1999
- Acquired: 2024 (by FRS L'Express des Îles)
- Maiden voyage: 15 May 1999
- In service: 1999
- Out of service: 30 October 2025
- Identification: IMO number: 9198551; Call sign: 5BLY2; MMSI number: 209936000
- Status: laid up in Rotterdam (for sale)

General characteristics
- Class & type: Kværner Fjellstrand Jumbo Cat 60m
- Tonnage: 2,273 GT; 135 DWT
- Length: 60.00 m (196 ft 10 in) (overall)
- Beam: 16.50 m (54 ft 2 in)
- Height: 5.77 m (18 ft 11 in)
- Draught: 2.16 m (7 ft 1 in)
- Decks: 3
- Ramps: Stern vehicle loading ramp
- Installed power: 2 × Caterpillar 3618 main diesel engines (total 10,800 kW)
- Propulsion: Waterjets
- Speed: 38.0 knots (70.4 km/h; 43.7 mph) (service)
- Capacity: 428 passengers; 52 cars (or 2 buses and 38 cars)
- Crew: 12–16

Algeciras Jet is a 60-metre high-speed passenger and vehicle catamaran built in 1999 by Kværner Fjellstrand in Omastrand, Norway. Launched as Baltic Jet for Nordic Jet Line to operate routes between Helsinki and Tallinn, she was sold to FRS Iberia in 2008, renamed Algeciras Jet, and transferred to serve crossings across the Strait of Gibraltar. In 2024, she joined FRS L'Express des Îles, briefly operating in the Caribbean as Ruby Express before reverting to Algeciras Jet.

== Service ==
The catamaran, the third of a series of five sister units built by the specialized shipyard Kværner Fjellstrand of Omastrand, Norway, was launched on 7 March 1999 with the name Baltic Jet and delivered on 7 May to the Norwegian Nordic Jet Line, from which it was transferred to the Gulf of Finland, where it started service on 15 May on the summer connections between Helsinki and Tallinn, alongside the already existing sister ship Nordic Jet. In the following summers, the two catamarans continued to serve the route regularly, until 21 September 2008, when the service was suppressed and the two units sold to the Spanish subsidiary of FRS, FRS Iberia, from which, in the case of Baltic Jet, it was renamed Algeciras Jet and transferred on 10 October from the Estonian capital to the Andalusian port of the same name, which it began to connect shortly after to Ceuta. Again, the fast ferry continued to operate regularly on the route between the two shores of the Strait of Gibraltar, operating occasionally in more recent times, particularly from 2021 to 2023, also on the connections with Tangier Med, between Tarifa and Tangier and between Motril and Melilla, the latter replacing the Poniente Jet.

On 8 April 2024, after approximately sixteen years of service between Spain and Morocco, the catamaran was transferred to FRS L'Express des Îles, the Guadeloupean subsidiary of the German group, from which it was renamed Ruby Express and introduced on 30 July on the connections between Pointe-à-Pitre, Roseau, Fort-de-France and Castries, between Guadeloupe, Dominica, Martinique and Saint Lucia. In June 2025, approximately one year after entering service on overseas routes, the catamaran was again renamed Algeciras Jet, continuing to be used on the route until 30 October 2025, when it was laid up in Kingston, Jamaica, being subsequently transferred to Port-de-France, where it remained until 11 January 2026, when it sailed to Dordrecht, resuming five days later, this time in the Netherlands. On 6 June of the following year it was finally transferred to Rotterdam and put up for sale.

== Sister ships ==
- Sama-1
- Ceuta Jet
- Santa Lucia
- Don Francesco
