= Aura Seaways =

Cargo ferry operated by DFDS Seaways

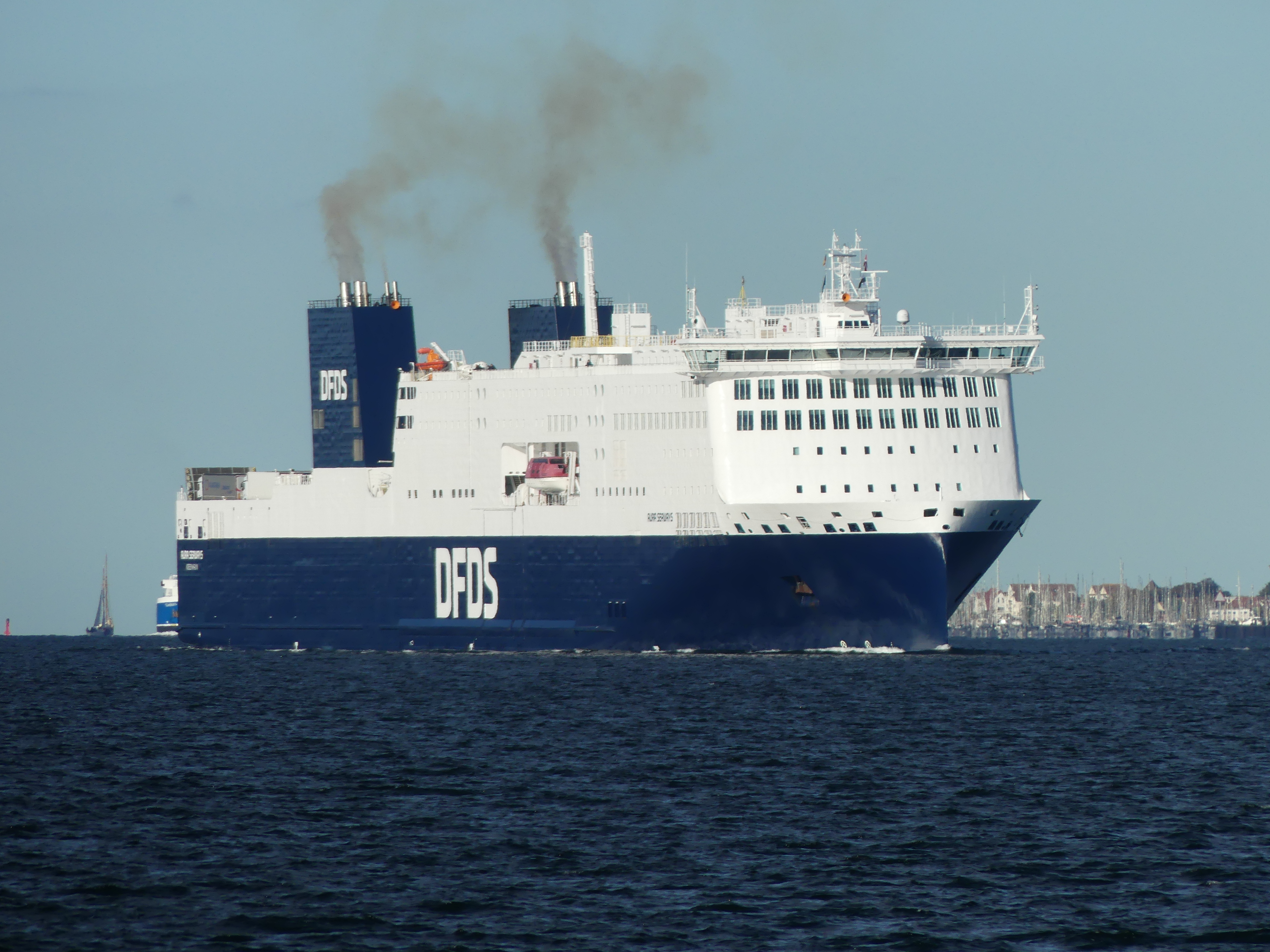

History
- Name: 2022 - present: Aura Seaways
- Owner: DFDS
- Operator: 2022 - present: DFDS Seaways
- Port of registry: Copenhagen, Denmark
- Route: Klaipėda–Kiel
- Builder: Guangzhou Shipyard International
- Laid down: 13 January 2020
- Launched: 31 August 2020
- In service: January 2022
- Identification: Call sign OXFN2; IMO number: 9851036; MMSI number: 219028116
- Status: In service

General characteristics
- Type: Ro-ro passenger ship
- Tonnage: 56,043 GT
- Length: 230.31 m (755.61 ft)
- Beam: 31.60 m (103.67 ft)
- Draught: 7 m (22.97 ft)
- Decks: 12
- Ramps: 3
- Installed power: 2 x 9600 kW + 2 x 7200 kW
- Propulsion: 2 x CPP propellers 5,3m in diameter 2 x Wärtsilä W6L46 diesel engine 2 x Wärtsilä W8L46 diesel engine
- Capacity: 690 Passengers; 4,500 lane metres
- Crew: 62

Aura Seaways is a roll-on/roll-off ferry operated by DFDS Seaways on the Klaipėda–Kiel route in the Baltic region. She is the first of a new class of Ropax ferries intended to operate the Baltic route with her sister ship Luna Seaways expected to join her in spring 2022. The ferry was built by Guangzhou Shipyard International.

== History ==
Aura Seaways and her sister ship were ordered in 2018 as part of a service expansion by DFDS, in order to increase capacity on their growing Baltic Sea network. Currently, the routes between Klaipėda and Karlshamn are served by primarily cargo-based roll-on/roll-off ferries providing limited passenger transport capabilities. The introduction of Aura Seaways enabled the combination of both passenger and freight networks, while providing an additional 30% of lane metres capacity on the route. Aura Seaways operates the Klaipėda-Kiel route
