= Topçular, Hani =

Village in Turkey

Topçular
- Neighbourhood
- Location in Turkey
- Coordinates: 38°27′34″N 40°24′09″E
- Country: Turkey
- Province: Diyarbakır
- District: Hani
- Population (2022): 673
- Time zone: UTC+3 (TRT)

Topçular (Kurdish: Nêribê topalon) is a neighbourhood in the municipality and district of Hani, Diyarbakır Province in Turkey. It is populated by Kurds and had a population of 673 in 2022.
