= MV Ancona =

Car-passenger ferry

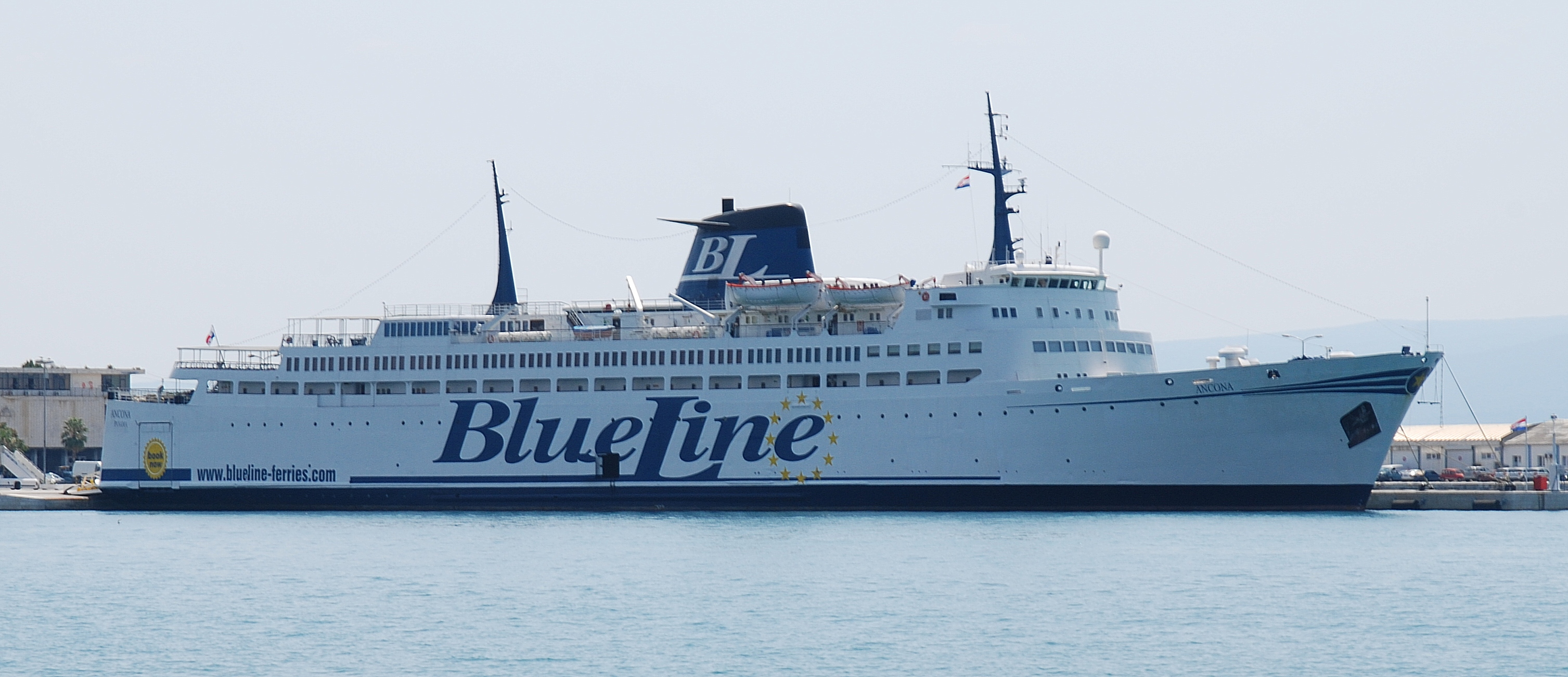
- MV Ancona moored in Split, Croatia, July 2010

History
- Name: 1966–1969: Svea; 1969–1972: Hispania; 1972–1978: Saga; 1978–1998: Knossos; 1998–2003: Captain Zaman II; 2003–2010: Ancona
- Owner: 1966–1969: Rederi AB Svea; 1969–1978: Swedish Lloyd; 1978–1998: Minoan Lines; 1998–2003: Ferro Ferryboat & RoRo Transport; 2003–2010: Blue Line International
- Operator: 1966–1969: Rederi AB Svea; 1969–1978: Swedish Lloyd; 1978–1998: Minoan Lines; 1998–2001: Diler Lines; 2001–2002: Comanav; 2003–2010: Blue Line International
- Port of registry: 1966–1969:Sweden, Stockholm; 1969–1978:Sweden, Gothenburg; 1978–1998:Greece, Heraklion; 1998–2000:Belize, Belize City; 2000–2003:Turkey, Istanbul; 2003–2010:Cyprus, Limassol
- Builder: Lindholmens varv, Gothenburg, Sweden
- Yard number: 1096
- Launched: 3 March 1966
- Completed: 1966
- Acquired: 27 October 1966
- Maiden voyage: 30 October 1966
- In service: 10 November 1966
- Out of service: 2010
- Identification: IMO number: 6608098
- Fate: Scrapped at Alang, India in 2010.
- Notes: Beached for scrap on December 15, 2010.

General characteristics (as built, 1966)
- Class & type: Saga-class ferry
- Tonnage: 7,883 GRT; 2,510 DWT
- Length: 141.20 m (463 ft 3 in)
- Beam: 20.90 m (68 ft 7 in)
- Draught: 5.34 m (17 ft 6 in)
- Installed power: 4 × Pielstick-Lindholmen 6PC2-2L400 diesels, combined 7,415 kW
- Propulsion: 2 propellers
- Speed: 18 kn (33 km/h; 21 mph)
- Capacity: 670 passengers; 670 berths; 100 cars

General characteristics (as Ancona, 2003)
- Tonnage: 12,394 GT; 1,910 t DWT
- Capacity: 1,532 passengers; 583 berths; 285 cars
- Notes: Otherwise the same as built

MS Ancona was a car-passenger ferry owned by Blue Line International and operated on it service linking Ancona in Italy to Split, Croatia. She was built in 1966 by Lindholmens varv in Gothenburg, Sweden, for Rederi AB Svea as MS Svea. As Svea, she was used on the joint Sweden–United Kingdom service operated by Ellerman's Wilson Line, Swedish Lloyd and Rederi AB Svea. In 1969 Svea was sold to Swedish Lloyd and renamed MS Hispania. In 1972, she was renamed MS Saga. In 1978, she was sold to Minoan Lines following the closure of Swedish Lloyd's passenger services and renamed MS Knossos. In 1998, she passed to Diler Lines, becoming their MS Captain Zaman II. In 2003, she was sold to Blue Line and was renamed Ancona. She was sold for scrap in October 2010 and breaking up was commenced on 15 December 2010.

== Concept and construction ==
In the mid-1960s, Rederi AB Svea], Swedish Lloyd and Ellerman's Wilson Line decided to establish a joint service between Sweden and the United Kingdom, appropriately named England–Sweden Line, abbreviated ELS. Each participant company had a new ship built for the service; Rederi AB Svea and Swedish Lloyd opted to order two identical sister ships (MS Saga and MS Svea) from Lindholmens varv in Gothenburg and Ellerman's Wilson ordered a slightly smaller vessel (MS Spero) from Cammell Laird in Birkenhead. Swedish Lloyd also ordered a third ship of the Saga/Svea design (MS Patricia) for its UK–Spain service.

All three ships built for the UK–Sweden service were based on an essentially traditional concept with subdued and luxurious interior fittings and without full-height car decks, with a service speed of 18 knots (33.34 km/h; 20.71 mph). Rederi AB Svea's Svea was launched from drydock on 3 March 1966 and delivered to her owners on 27 October the same year.

== Service history ==
=== 1966–1969: Rederi AB Svea ===
Following delivery to Rederi AB Svea, Svea sailed from Gothenburg to her port of registry, Stockholm. On 30 October 1966, she made an introductory cruise around the Stockholm archipelago. Subsequently, she sailed back to Gothenburg and entered service on the Gothenburg–Hull route on 10 November 1966, running parallel to Ellerman's Wilson Line's Spero, while Swedish Lloyd's Saga sailed on the Gothenburg–Tilbury route.

From early on, the ELS service faced fierce competition from Tor Line, which had also initiated a UK–Sweden service in 1966. Unlike the ELS ships, Tor Line's MS Tor Anglia and MS Tor Hollandia had modern furnishings, full-height car decks and had a service speed of 22 knots (40.74 km/h; 25.32 mph). Possibly due to the high level of competition, Rederi AB Svea decided to withdraw from the joint UK–Sweden service in March 1968, when Svea was sold to Swedish Lloyd for a delivery in 1969.

=== 1969–1978: Swedish Lloyd ===
Swedish Lloyd took over Svea on 7 January 1969 when the ship arrived at the Burmeister & Wain shipyard for rebuilding for the UK–Spain service. In April 1969, she was renamed Hispania and entered service on the Southampton–Bilbao route, running parallel to her sister ship Patricia. On 29 November 1970, Hispania was moved to the Gothenburg–Tilbury service, running parallel to Saga. During the off-season, Swedish Lloyd marketed round trips on their ships as four-day mini cruises, making Hispania and her sister ships some of the first cruiseferries in the world.

Competition from Tor Line remained fierce on the line service and, in February 1972, the joint ELS service was radically cut down On 7 February, Swedish Lloyd sold Saga to Stena Line, and Hispania was in turn renamed Saga. On 25 February, Ellerman's Wilson Line withdrew Spero from the service, leaving Saga (ex-Svea) as the only ship of the England–Sweden Line.

In 1975–76, Tor Line introduced notably larger and faster sister vessels, MS Tor Britannia and MS Tor Scandinavia, to the UK–Sweden service. The Saga could not compete with the more modern tonnage and, on 2 September 1977, Swedish Lloyd abandoned the Gothenburg–Tilbury service. The Southampton–Bilbao service had been abandoned a month before, and as a result both Saga and Patricia were laid up at Lindholmens varv in Gothenburg.

=== 1978–1998: Minoan Lines ===
In March 1978, Saga was sold to the Greece-based Minoan Lines. On 6 April 1978, she was renamed Knossos and subsequently entered service on Minoan Lines Piraeus–Heraklion route. On 16 September 1980, the ship suffered an engine room fire while in Piraues. In 1985, she again sailed parallel to one of her sister ships, when Minoan Lines acquired Festos, ex-Saga.

In 1988, Knossos was moved to the Piraeus–Chania service, where she remained until October 1995 when Minoan Lines decided to abandon the route. Knossos was laid up until March 1996, when she started sailing on the Patras–Igoumenitsa–Corfu–Ancona service. In the following year, the service was shortened to Igoumenitsa–Corfu–Brindisi, with calls at Corfu omitted during the winter season.

=== 1998–2003: Diler Lines and Comanav ===
In February 1998, Knossos (as well as Festos) was sold to Ferro Ferryboat & RoRo Transport. Knossos was renamed Captain Zaman II and Festos became Captain Zaman I. Both ships entered service on the Turkey-based Diler Lines' Istanbul–Odessa route. In August the same year, the route of the ships was altered into Brindisi–Igoumenitsa. During the summer seasons of 2001 and 2002, Captain Zaman II was chartered to Comanav for service between Nador and Sète in France. Following the end of her 2002 charter to Comanav Captain Zaman II was laid up at Tuzla, Turkey.

=== 2003–2010: Blue Line ===
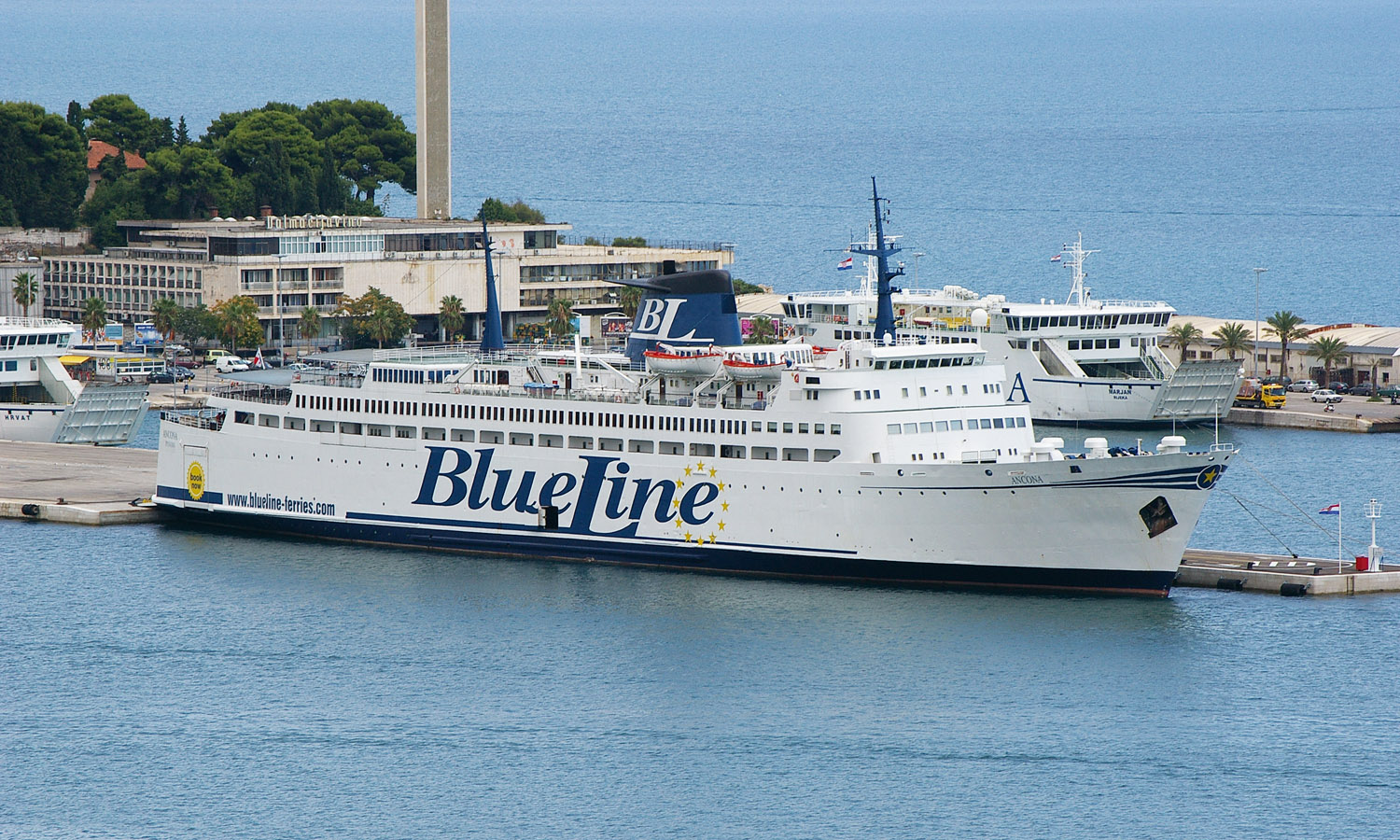
Ancona moored at Split on August 4, 2010

On 17 January 2003, Captain Zaman II was sold to the Croatia-based SEM Maritime for service with its subsidiary Blue Line International. The ship was renamed Ancona and entered service on Blue Line's Ancona–Split service on 1 April 2003. During the summer season, the service also included occasional calls at Hvar and Vis.

== Retirement ==
Ancona was withdrawn from service in 2010 due to the new SOLAS 2010 regulations coming into effect. Scrapping was commenced at Alang, India, on 15 December 2010.
