= Ditlev =

Name list/set index

Ditlev is a given name. Notable people with the name include:

- Emilius Ditlev Bærentzen (1799–1868), Danish portrait painter and lithographer
- Hans Ditlev Bendixsen (1842–1902), American shipbuilder on the West Coast
- Lars Ditlev (1951–2021), Danish-American football player
- Ditlev Blunck (1798–1853), Danish painter associated with the Danish Golden Age
- Reidar Ditlev Danielsen (1916–2000), Norwegian civil servant
- John Ditlev-Simonsen (1898–2001), Norwegian sailor
- Olaf Ditlev-Simonsen (1897–1978), Norwegian bandy player, footballer, sailor, sports administrator and businessperson
- Per Ditlev-Simonsen (born 1932), Norwegian politician
- Adolf Ditlev Jørgensen (1840–1897), Danish historian
- Hans Ditlev Franciscus Linstow (1787–1851), Danish-born Norwegian architect
- Haakon Ditlev Lowzow (1854–1915), Norwegian military officer and politician
- Ditlev Gothard Monrad (1811–1887), Danish politician and bishop
- Nicolai Ditlev Ammon Ræder (1817–1884), Norwegian jurist and politician
- Christian Ditlev Frederik Reventlow (1748–1827), Danish statesman and reformer
- Christian Ditlev Reventlow (1671–1738), Danish diplomat and military leader
- Christian Ditlev Reventlow (1710–1775), Danish Privy Councillor, nobleman and estate owner
- Niels Ditlev Riegels (1755–1802), Danish historian, journalist and pamphleteer
- Ditlev Ludvig Rogert (1742–1813), Danish songwriter, credited with composing Denmark's royal anthem
- Karl Ditlev Rygh (1839–1915), Norwegian archaeologist and politician
- Ditlev Vibe (1670–1731), Danish/Norwegian civil servant
- Magnus Ditlev (born 1997), Danish triathlete

== See also ==
- Sverre Ditlev-Simonsen & Co., an international shipping company based in Oslo
