= List of ship commissionings in 1979 =

The list of ship commissionings in 1979 includes a chronological list of all ships commissioned in 1979.

	Operator	Ship	Flag	Class and type	Pennant	Other notes
3 January	SAGA Linjen	Fennia	Finland	ferry		Chartered from Svea Line (Finland)
January	Holland Expo	Tor Scandinavia	Sweden	Cruiseferry		Chartered from Tor Line
31 January	Royal Navy of Oman	Al Munassir		Amphibious warfare ship		
17 February	Svea Line (Finland)	Fennia	Finland	ferry		Returned from charter; in Silja Line traffic
26 February	Tor Line	Tor Scandinavia	Sweden	Cruiseferry		Returned from charter to Holland Expo
3 March	United States Navy	USS New York City		Los Angeles-class submarine	SSN-696	
24 March	Italia Crociere	Galileo Galilei	Italy	Cruise ship		Formerly with Lloyd Triestino
26 April	Rederi AB Slite	Botnia Express	Finland	Ferry		Ex-Diana under charter from Oy Vaasa-Umeå Ab in Viking Line traffic
27 April	Indian Navy	INS Bedi		Pondicherry-class minesweeper	M63	
27 April	Indian Navy	INS Bhavnagar		Pondicherry-class minesweeper	M64	
4 May	Royal Navy	HMS Broadsword		Type 22 frigate	F88	
12 May	United States Navy	USS Nicholson		Spruance-class destroyer	DD-982	
4 June	SF Line	Turella	Finland	Cruiseferry		For Viking Line traffic
8 June	Finnish Navy	Pohjanmaa		Pohjanmaa-class minelayer		
9 June	Rederi AB Slite	Diana II av Slite	Sweden	Cruiseferry		For Viking Line traffic
20 June	Oy Vaasa-Umeå Ab	Botnia Express	Finland	Ferry		Ex-Diana; entered service after charter to Rederi AB Slite
25 June	Peruvian Navy	BAP Villavisencio		Lupo-class frigate	FM-52	
14 July	United States Navy	USS John Rodgers		Spruance-class destroyer	DD-983	
26 July	Royal Netherlands Navy	HNLMS Callenburgh		Kortenaer-class frigate	F808	
28 July	United States Navy	USS Nassau		Tarawa-class amphibious assault ship	LHA-4	
25 August	United States Navy	USS Leftwich		Spruance-class destroyer	DD-984	
31 August	Soviet Navy	Zadornyy		Project 1135 large anti-submarine ship	520	
21 September	United States Navy	USS Cushing		Spruance-class destroyer	DD-985	
25 September	Royal Navy	HMS Cardiff		Type 42 destroyer	D108	
September	Rederi AB Slite	Diana II	Sweden	Cruiseferry		Ex-Diana II av Slite; in Viking Line traffic
17 November	United States Navy	USS Harry W. Hill		Spruance-class destroyer	DD-986	
19 November	United States Navy	USS McInerney		Oliver Hazard Perry-class frigate	FFG-8	
29 November	Irish Naval Service	LÉ Aoife		Deirdre-class offshore patrol vessel	P22	
18 December	Royal Navy	HMS Brecon		Hunt-class mine countermeasures vessel	M29	
23 December	Peruvian Navy	BAP Carvajal		Lupo-class frigate	FM-51	
Date unknown	Stena Line	Stena Saga	Sweden	Ferry		Rebuilt from Stena Oceanica
