= Olaf Ditlev-Simonsen (born 1865) =

Norwegian ship owner (1865–1960)

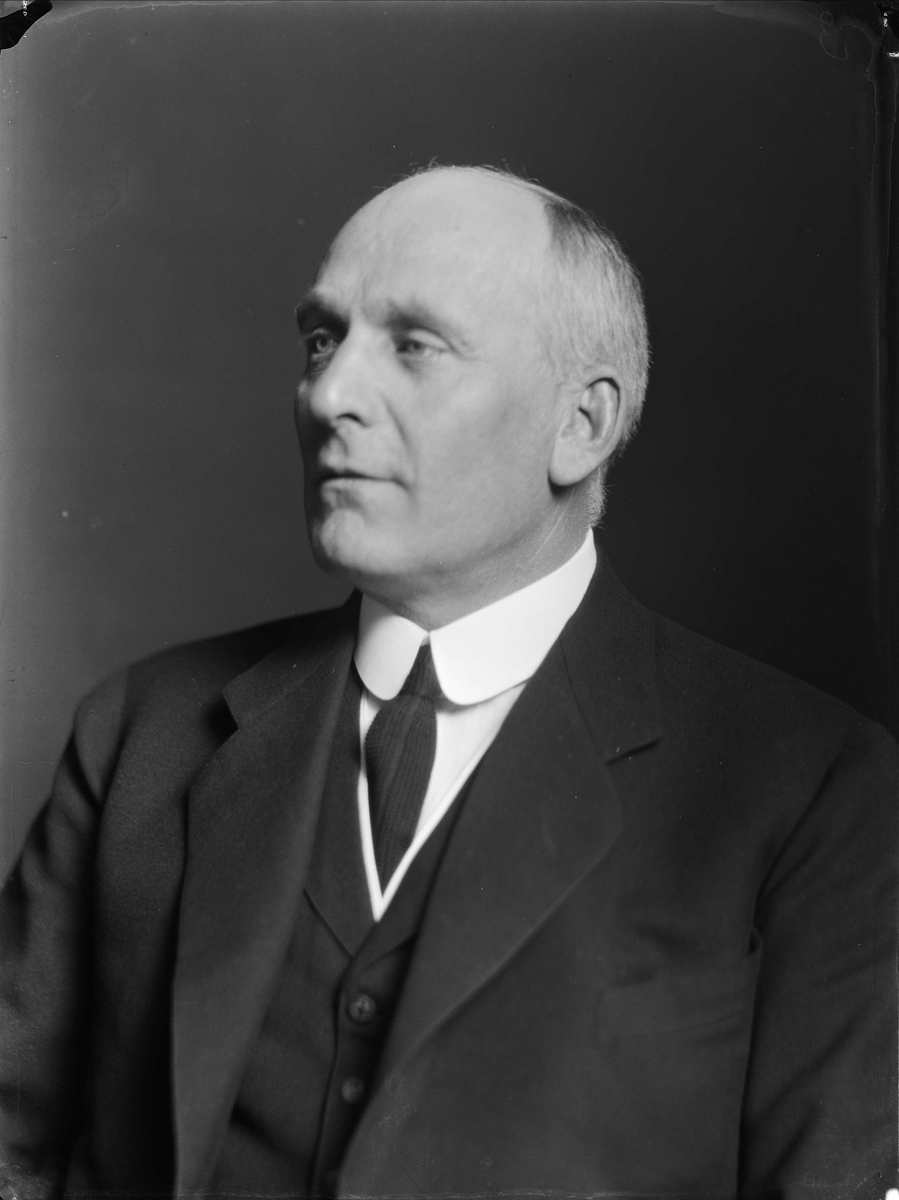
- Ditlev-Simonsen in 1920
- Born: 15 December 1865; Sarpsborg, Norway
- Died: 16 January 1960 (aged 94)
- Occupation: ship owner
- Children: Olaf Ditlev-Simonsen; John Ditlev-Simonsen; Sverre Ditlev-Simonsen
- Awards: Order of St. Olav; Order of Vasa

Olaf Ditlev-Simonsen (15 December 1865 – 16 January 1960) was a Norwegian ship owner who developed one of the largest shipping companies in Norway.

== Personal life ==
Ditlev-Simonsen was born in Sarpsborg to Ole Christian Simonsen and Christiane Dorthea Christiansen. He was the father of Olaf Ditlev-Simonsen Jr (1897–1978), father of Sverre Ditlev-Simonsen, and grandfather of politician Per Ditlev-Simonsen (minister of defense and mayor of Oslo).

== Career ==
Ditlev-Simonsen developed one of the largest shipping companies in Norway, together with three of his sons. He was also active in organizational work, and was a board member of the Norwegian Shipowners' Association, Kristiania Rederiforening, Oslo chamber of commerce and the Port Board of Oslo. He was elected member of the municipal council of Kristiania, and served as vice mayor 1914–1915. In this position he was quite busy with the 1914 Jubilee Exhibition at Frogner and Skarpsno. The maritime part of the exhibition laid the foundation for the Norwegian Maritime Museum. Ditlev-Simonsen was a proponent for the establishment of the museum, and became a member of the board from 1915. He was chairman of the board from 1922 to 1933.

He chaired the board of Norges Handels og Sjøfartstidende from 1911 to 1939, and chaired the board of Det Søndenfjelds-Norske Dampskibsselskab from 1924 to 1940.

He was decorated Knight, First Class of the Order of St. Olav in 1939, and was Commander of the Order of Vasa.

Ditlev-Simonsen was an eager sports sailor, and had the two cutters Vav and Isabel Alexandra.

== Selected works ==
- En sjøgutt ser tilbake
