= MS Rigel III =

1978 ferry

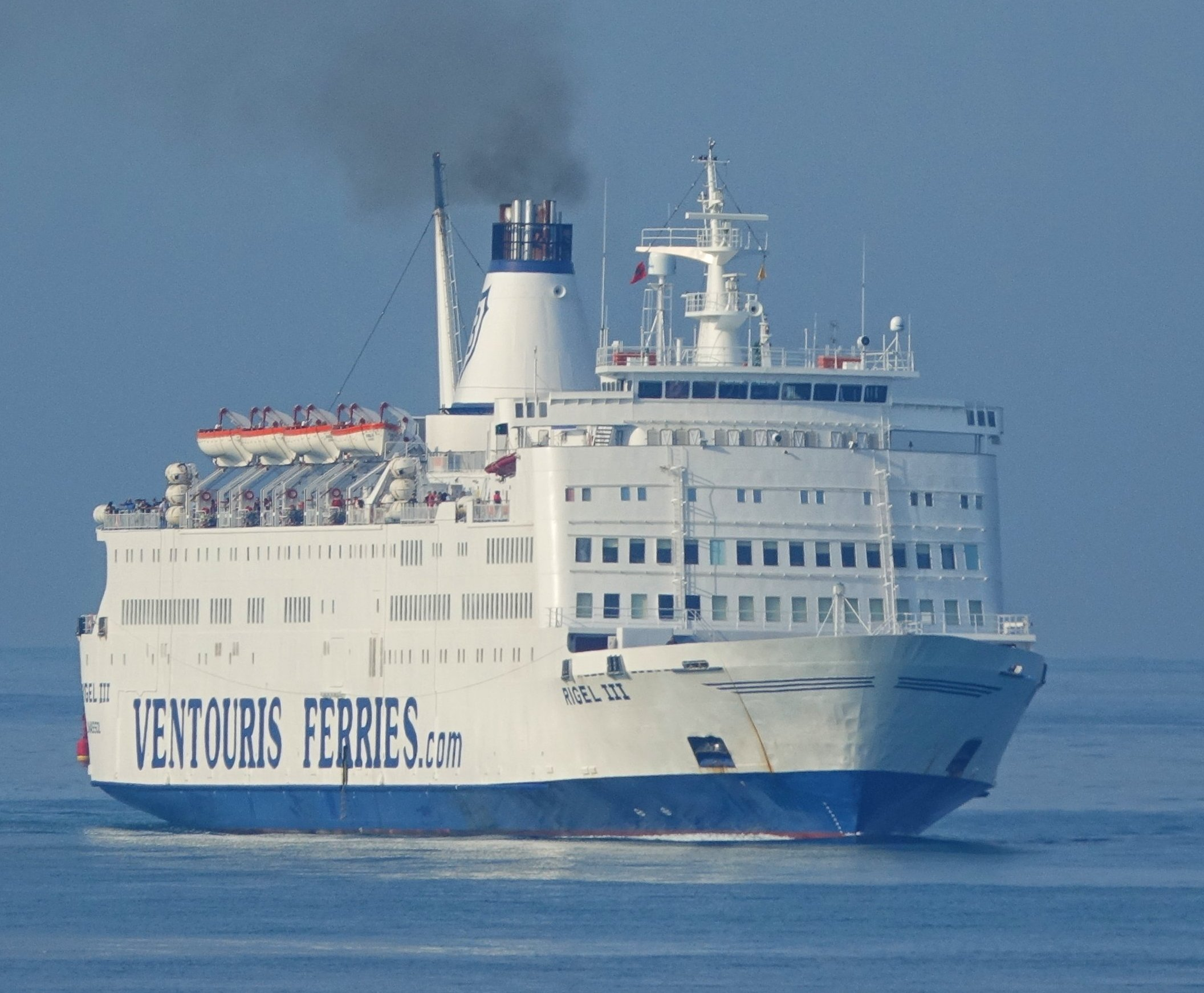
- Rigel III at Durrës in 2017.

History
- Name: 1979–1988: Turella; 1988–1996: Stena Nordica; 1996–1998: Lion King; 1998–2008: Fantaasia; 2008–2010: Kongshavn; 2010-2017: Regina della Pace; 2017–Present: Rigel III
- Owner: 1979–1988: SF Line; 1988–1996: Stena Line; 1996–1997: Lion Ferry; 1997–2008: Tallink; 2008–2010: Kystlink; 2010–2017: Blue Line International; 2017–Present: Ventouris Ferries
- Operator: 1979–1988: SF Line (in Viking Line traffic); 1988–1996: Stena Line; 1996–1997: Lion Ferry; 1997–2005: Tallink; 2005: Algérie Ferries; 2006: Tallink; 2006–2007: Comanav; 2007: Algérie Ferries; 2007–2008: Kystlink; 2010-2017: Blue Line International; 2017–Present: Ventouris Ferries
- Port of registry: 1979–1988:Finland, Mariehamn; 1988–1996:Sweden, Gothenburg; 1996–1998:Sweden, Halmstad; 1998–2008:Estonia, Tallinn; 2008–2010:Norway, Langesund; 2010–2010:Malta, Valletta; 2010–2014:Panama, Panama City; 2014–Present:Cyprus, Limassol
- Ordered: 17 March 1978
- Builder: Wärtsilä Turku shipyard, Finland
- Yard number: 1242
- Launched: 21 November 1978
- Sponsored by: Margareta Lundqvist
- Christened: 21 November 1978
- Completed: 1979
- Acquired: 4 June 1979
- In service: 4 June 1979
- Identification: IMO number: 7807744
- Status: In service

General characteristics (as built)
- Type: Cruiseferry
- Tonnage: 10,604 GRT; 3,700 tonnes deadweight (DWT)
- Length: 136.11 m (446 ft 7 in)
- Beam: 24.20 m (79 ft 5 in)
- Draught: 5.40 m (17 ft 9 in)
- Ice class: 1 A
- Installed power: 4 × Wärtsilä-Pielstick 12PC2-2V diesels; 17,650 kW (23,670 hp)
- Speed: 21.5 kn (39.82 km/h)
- Capacity: 1700 passengers; 740 passenger beds; 554 cars

General characteristics (Stena Nordica and after)
- Tonnage: 16,405 GT
- Decks: 10
- Speed: 19 kn (35.19 km/h)
- Capacity: 1,550 passengers; 1,440 lanemeters
- Notes: Otherwise the same as built

MS Rigel III is a cruiseferry owned by the Greek-based company Ventouris Ferries. She was built in 1979 as MS Turella by Wärtsilä Turku shipyard, Finland for SF Line for use in Viking Line traffic. In 1988 she was sold to Stena Line, becoming MS Stena Nordica. In 1996, she was transferred to Lion Ferry and was renamed MS Lion King. In 1998, she was sold to Tallink and renamed MS Fantaasia. As Fantaasia she also sailed under charter to Algérie Ferries, Comanav and Kystlink during the years 2005–2008. Following the end of her charter to Kystlink in 2008 the latter company bought her, renaming her MS Kongshavn. After Kystlink was declared bankrupt in late 2008 the ship was laid up until sold to the Croatia-based ferry operator Blue Line International, and operated on their service between Split and Ancona as MS Regina della Pace. In 2017 the ship was sold to the Greek-based company Ventouris Ferries and is currently operating on the route Bari–Durrës.

== Concept and construction ==
SF Line begun planning for a new larger ferry for the Viking Line traffic between South-West Finland and Sweden in the mid-1970s. The main person in charge of the design of the new ship was SF Line's founder and CEO Gunnar Eklund, with his son Nils-Erik Eklund and the company's technical inspector Kaj Jansson participating in the design process. Experiences from SF Line's previous new buildings — particularly MS Aurella of 1973 — heavily influenced the design of the new vessel, which was drawn with large car-decks. However, the new vessel was planned to be twice as large in terms of gross register tonnage as Aurella, and she was to have twice as many cabins.

In 1976, SF Line asked for tenders from various shipyards around the world for construction of a 1,700-passenger, 540-car ferry. The cheapest bid, 80 million Finnish markka (20 million United States dollar by exchange rates of the time), was made by Mitsubishi Heavy Industries of Japan who outbid the Finnish Wärtsilä shipyard by 36 million markka. On 13 September 1977, SF Line signed a contract with Mitsubishi Heavy Industries for construction of a ferry. However, the funding of the project was subject to approval by the Bank of Finland and as at the time the employment level in Finland's shipyards was low, the Bank of Finland decided not to grant its approval to the project's funding with hopes of forcing the company to order a ship from a Finnish shipyard. After prolonged negotiations between both SF Line and the Bank of Finland as well as SF Line and Wärtsilä, SF Line placed an order with Wärtsilä on 17 March 1978. In the end the cost of the ship from Wärtsilä was approximately 15% more expensive than it would have been if built by Mitsubishi, despite a subvention of 17 million markka from the Bank of Finland.

As with most previous new buildings of Viking Line, the details of the ship's interior design were entrusted to Robert Tillberg of Tillberg Design. Due to the ship's larger size, her onboard services could be greatly upgraded from the previous generation ships, with accommodation and public spaces close to the standards of the time's cruise ships. For the first time on a Viking Line ship trafficking between continental Finland and Sweden, the ship included an à la carte restaurant in addition to the traditional buffet (Rederi AB Slite's cruise ship SS Apollo III had an à la carte restaurant since 1976, but she only trafficked between the Åland islands and Sweden). SF Line's new ship was also given large conference facilities by the day's standards, capable of hosting 80 people.

The basic design of the new building was apparently successful, as even before she was completed SF Line's fellow Viking Line members Rederi AB Slite and Rederi Ab Sally asked access to the ship's plans so that they could order additional ships of the same design. However, in the end Slite opted to order a slightly larger vessel from Meyer Werft in Germany, while SF Line refused to give Sally access to the new ship's plans and as a result Sally too placed an order with Meyer Werft.

The keel of SF Line's new building was laid on 10 August 1978. She was launched from drydock on 24 November 1978 and christened MS Turella by Margareta Lundqvist, the widow of the major SF Line shareholder Fraenk Lundqvist. On 18 January 1979, SF Line ordered a sister ship for the Turella from Wärtsilä, which eventually entered service in 1980 as MS Rosella. The construction of the Turella was completed on 4 June 1980 and she was delivered to SF Line on the same date, 11 days earlier than agreed.

== History ==
=== 1979–1987: Viking Line service ===
Immediately following delivery Turella entered service on Viking Line's Turku–Mariehamn–Stockholm route, sailing parallel with Rederi AB Slite's slightly larger newbuilding MS Diana II that entered service on 14 June 1979. Turella remained on the Turku–Stockholm service until 2 June 1980, when she was transferred to the shorter and more freight-intensive Naantali–Mariehamn–Kapellskär route following the delivery of Rederi Ab Sally's new MS Viking Sally—that was even larger than Turella or Diana II—for the Turku service. On the Naantali–Kapellskär service Turella replaced the ageing MS Marella and initially sailed parallel to her brand-new sistership MS Rosella. For the summer season of 1981 Rosella and Diana II switched routes, and from that year onwards Turella again had Diana II as her routemate.

=== 1988–1996: Stena Line and Lion Ferry service ===
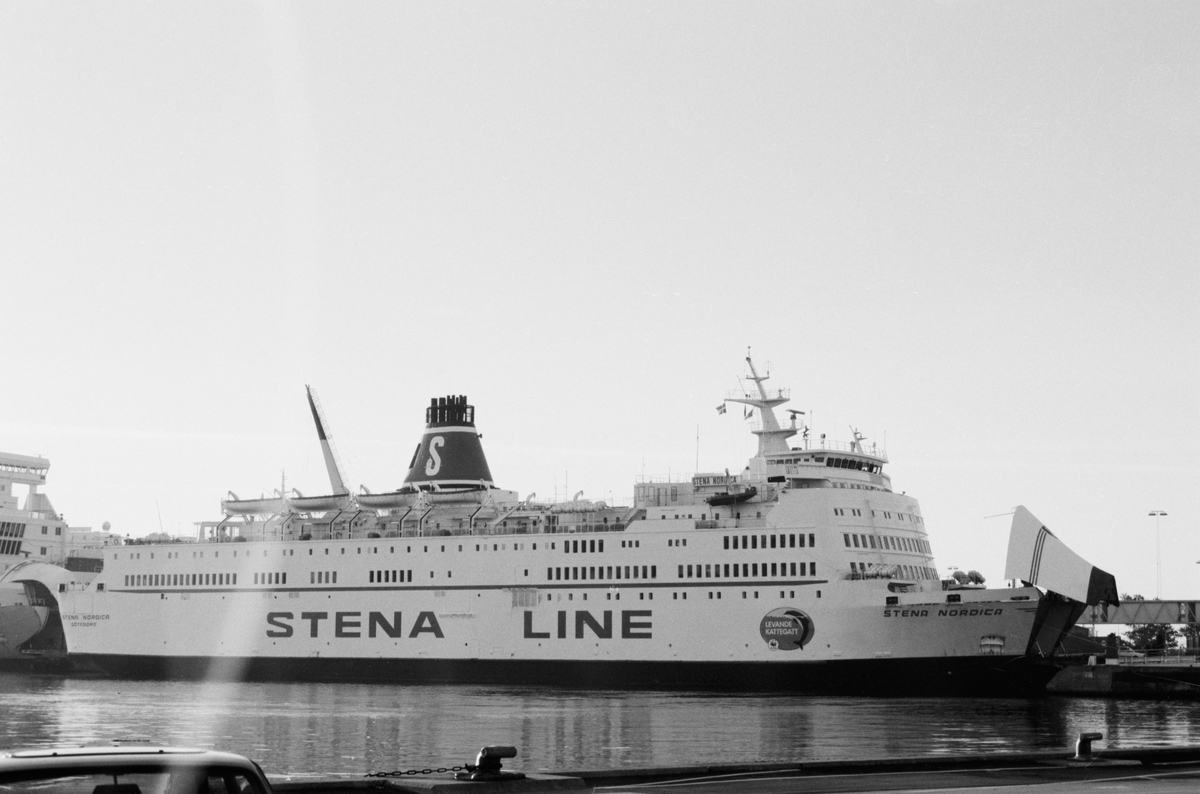
Stena Nordica

In September 1988, SF Line took delivery of the new MS Amorella, which replaced Rosella on the Turku–Stockholm route. Originally SF Line had agreed to sell the Rosella to Stena Line upon delivery of the new ship. However, due to the Amorella being delivered seven months behind schedule the Rosella could not be delivered to Stena when originally agreed. In the end the Turella was sold instead of Rosella, as it was generally in a better condition and easier to convert for the traffic Stena planned for her. After rebuilding at Cityvarvet, Gothenburg, the Turella re-emerged as MS Stena Nordica (a name carried by many Stena Line ships over the years). Stena Nordica was placed a route connecting Gothenburg to Fredrikshavn in Denmark and Moss in Norway. She also occasionally served on the Gothenburg–Kiel route when the ships normally sailing that route were docked. In 1996, Stena Nordica was rebuilt at Öresundsvarvet, Landskrona, Sweden, transferred to the fleet of Stena's subsidiary Lion Ferry and renamed MS Lion King. During the next 1½ years she sailed on routes Halmstad (Sweden) – Grenå (Denmark) and Karlskrona (Sweden) – Gdynia (Poland).

=== 1996–2005: Tallink service ===
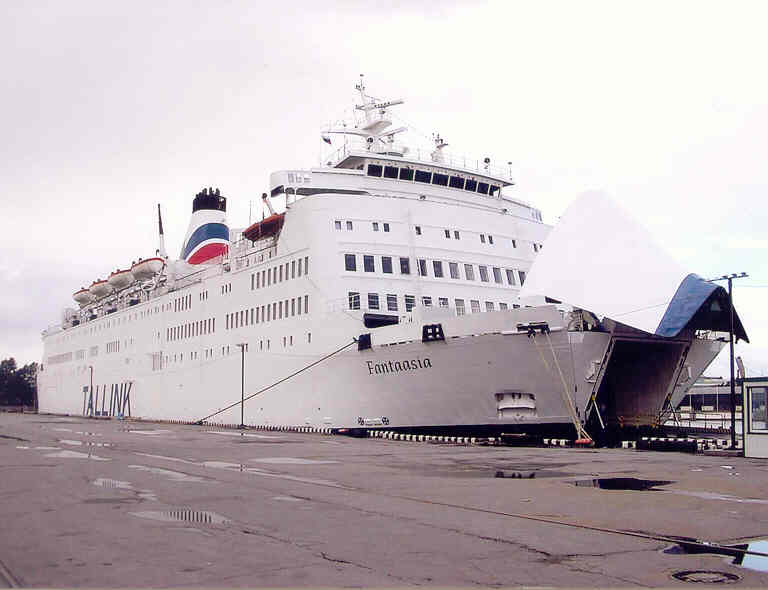
Fantaasia at Saint Petersburg.

At the end of 1997, Lion King was sold to Tallink, who renamed her MS Fantaasia and placed her on the Helsinki–Tallinn route (where she served alongside her old Viking Line fleetmate MS Meloodia). In 2002, after the delivery of the new MS Romantika, the Fantaasia was moved to the Tallinn–Stockholm route, where she sailed alongside another old fleetmate from the Viking Line days, MS Regina Baltica. In 2004, the new MS Victoria I replaced Fantaasia on the Tallinn–Stockholm route, and from the start of April of the same year Fantaasia opened a new Helsinki–Tallinn–St. Petersburg route for Tallink. Due to a rise in port fees issued by the Russian government and due to visa regulations not being prognosed to get any better between Russia and the European Union as it had been presumed when the line was started, the line was terminated by Tallink on 2 January 2005.

=== 2005–2009: charters and Kystlink service ===
Following the collapse of the St. Petersburg traffic, the Fantaasia was swiftly chartered to Algérie Ferries for a duration of nine months, during which she sailed between France and Algeria. After the end of the charter she spent five months laid up in Tallinn until she was placed on Tallink's new Riga–Stockholm route in April 2006. However, after little over a month of traffic she was replaced by the larger Regina Baltica, and subsequently chartered to Comanav until April 2007. Following the end of charter to Comanav, she was again chartered to Algérie Ferries until October 2007.

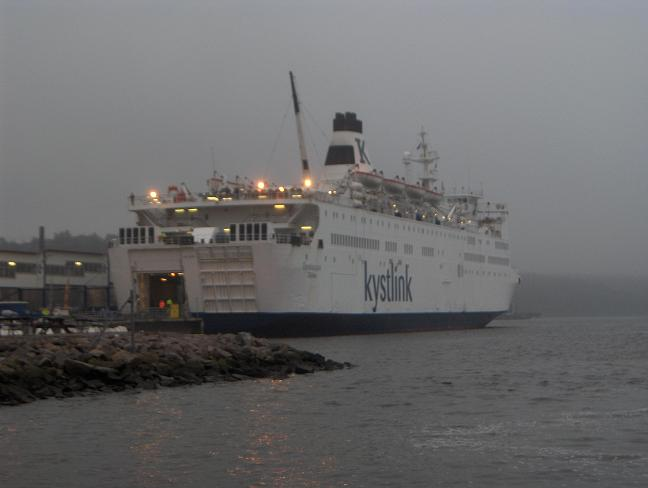
Fantaasia at Strömstad during her charter to Kystlink

Following the second Algérie Ferries charter, the Fantaasia was chartered to the Norway-based Kystlink for three months (with an option for three additional months) from October 2007 onwards to replace their MS Pride of Telemark that was out of service following an accident when the ship rammed the breakwater at Hirtshals, Denmark. Before entering service for Kystlink, Fantaasia was docked at Cityvarvet, Gothenburg. On 15 November, the Swedish Maritime Authority Sjöfartsinspektionen deemed the ship unsafe and prohibited it from leaving Cityvarvet until 18 faults found during the inspection were fixed. Twelve of the faults were considered severe, including several permanently open watertight doors, a non-functional loudspeaker system, blocked emergency exists and non-functional winches used for lowering lifeboats. According to Tallink, the inspection was made while refitting of the ship was still in process, which they cited as the reason why several onboard systems were turned off-line and normal safety procedures were not observed. On 11 December, the ship entered service with Kystlink on its Langesund–Hirtshals and Langesund–Strömstad routes.

On 15 April 2008, the Fantaasia was sold by Tallink to Kystlink, with delivery date set for June of the same year. She was eventually delivered to her new owners on 30 June 2008, subsequently re-registered in Norway and renamed MS Kongshavn. However, Kystlink ceased their traffic on 21 October 2008, with the Kongshavn subsequently laid up at Sandefjord, Norway. In March 2009, Kongshavn was drydocked in Fredericia, Denmark.

=== 2010- 2017: Blue Line service ===
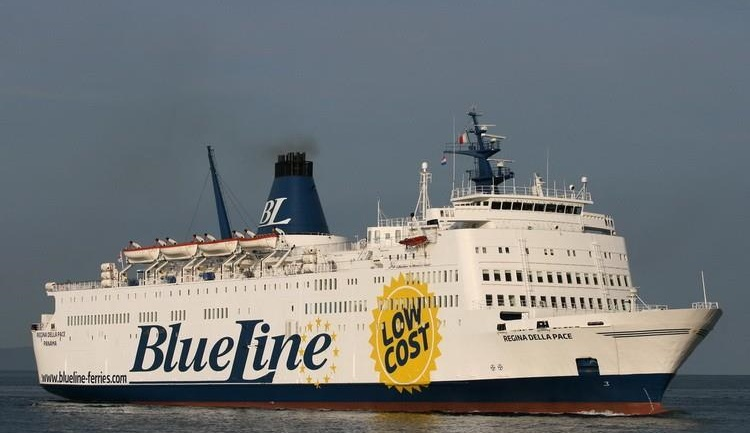
Regina della Pace in 2010

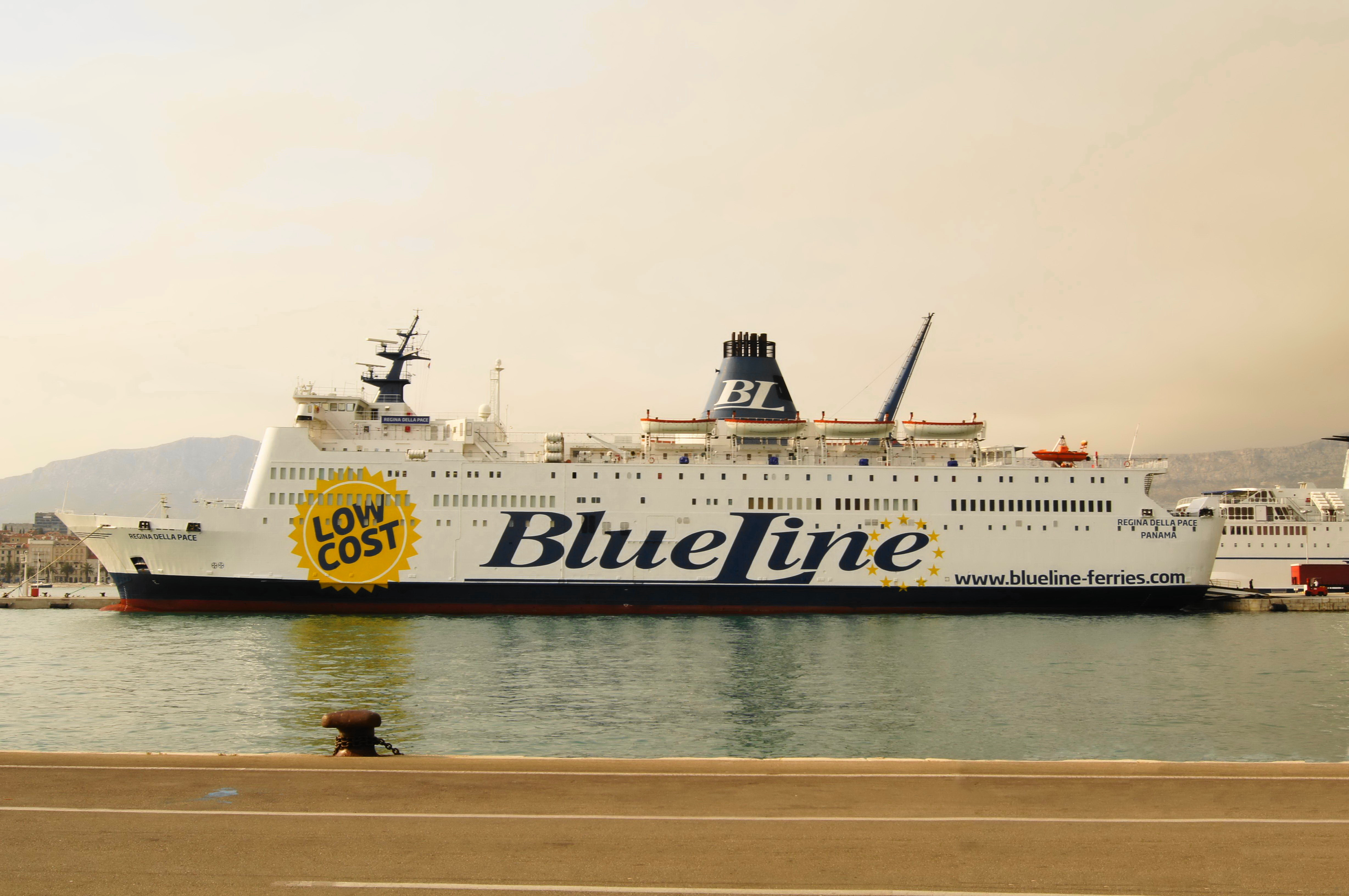
Regina della Pace at Split in 2011

On 23 December 2009 the Croatian ferry operator Blue Line International was reported to have purchased the Kongshavn, with the intention of using her on their service between Ancona and Split. Blue Line took delivery of the ship on 17 March 2010, renamed her Regina della Pace and initially re-registered her under the Maltese flag. Prior to entering service with Blue Line on 19 April 2010, the Regina della Pace was re-registered to Panama. The vessel continues in service and was seen in July 2012 on that route. In 2017 the ship was sold to Ventouris Ferries and renamed Rigel III
