= MS Ariadne =

MS Ariadne is the name of several motor ships:

- MS Ariadne (1966), launched as MS Tor Hollandia, a ferry in service 1975–1999
- MS Ariadne (2002), later becoming MS Moby Tommy, a ferry in service 2002–2006
