= Eidsiva Rederi =

International shipping company based in Oslo

Eidsiva Rederi ASA
- Type: Public
- Industry: Shipping
- Founded: 1930
- Headquarters: Oslo, Norway
- Area served: Global
- Key people: Jørgen G. Heje (CEO); Per Ditlev-Simonsen (Chairman)
- Revenue: ▲NOK 279.6 million (2006)
- Operating income: NOK 83.6 million (2006)
- Net income: NOK 47.9 million (2006)
- Website: www.eidsiva.no

Eidsiva Rederi (OSE: EID) is an international shipping company based in Oslo that operates nine car carriers and four Ro-Ro vessels in addition to two other ships. Among the chartering companies are Hyundai and DFDS Tor Line.

== History ==
The company was founded as Sverre Ditlev-Simonsen & Co in 1930 by Sverre Ditlev-Simonsen and listed on the Oslo Stock Exchange the same year. It started out as a dry cargo and tanker operator. In the 1970s the company entered the offshore sector, operating a number of semi-submersible drilling rigs. In 1990 the offshore subsidiary SDS Drilling was sold to Ross Offshore Group that was later acquired by Transocean. The company then ventured into the handysize bulk market, and entered a cooperation with B. Skaugen Shipping and Fednav Group and along with other companies established the pool Trinity Bulk Carriers. In 1996 the Heje family took a larger ownership in the company.
