= Per Ditlev-Simonsen =

Norwegian politician (born 1932)

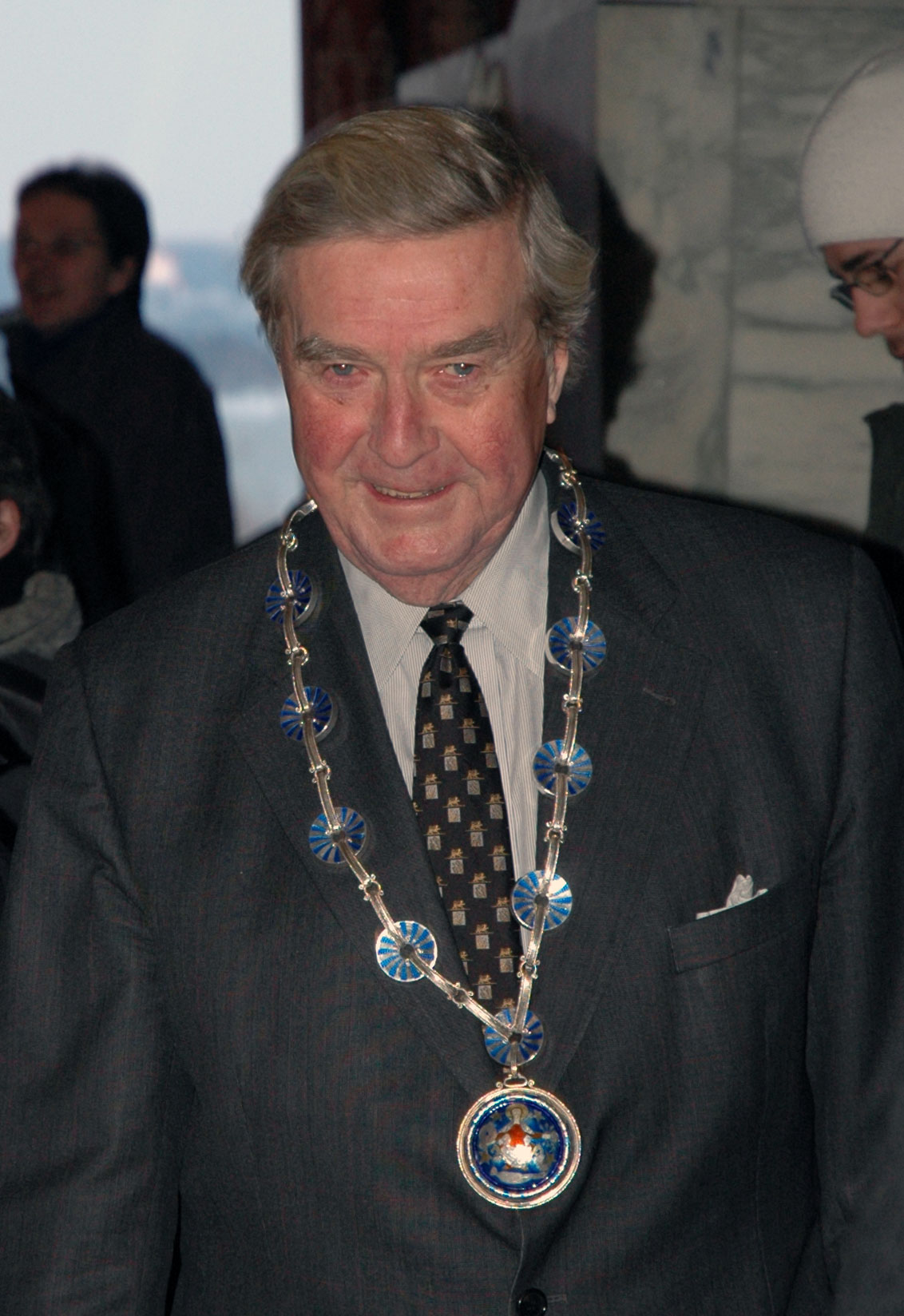

64th Mayor of Oslo
- In office 25 October 1995 – 29 August 2007
- Deputy: Svenn Kristiansen
- Governing Mayor: Rune Gerhardsen; Fritz Huitfeldt; Erling Lae
- Preceded by: Ann-Marit Sæbønes
- Succeeded by: Svenn Kristiansen

Minister of Defence
- In office 16 October 1989 – 3 November 1990
- Prime Minister: Jan P. Syse
- Preceded by: Johan Jørgen Holst
- Succeeded by: Johan Jørgen Holst

Member of the Norwegian Parliament
- In office 1 October 1981 – 30 September 1985
- Constituency: Oslo

Personal details
- Born: 12 June 1932 (age 94) Oslo, Norway
- Party: Conservative
- Relations: Olaf Ditlev-Simonsen Sr (grandfather); Olaf Ditlev-Simonsen Jr (uncle); John Ditlev-Simonsen (uncle)
- Children: Cecilie Ditlev-Simonsen
- Education: Stanford University
- Occupation: Shipping magnate

Per Ditlev-Simonsen (born 12 June 1932) is a Norwegian politician. He was the mayor of Oslo, representing the Conservative Party, from 1995 to 2007. He stepped down on 23 August 2007 following the Swiss bank-account scandal.

Ditlev-Simonsen was an officer of the Norwegian Royal Guards, and he later attended Stanford University getting a Master of Arts degree. After college, Ditlev-Simonsen became a partner in his father's shipping company Sverre Ditlev-Simonsen & Co (SDS) in 1955. He was a partner in the company until 1995.

Ditlev-Simonsen was a Member of Parliament from 1981 to 1985, serving in the Standing Committee of Finance. From 1989 to 1990 Ditlev-Simonsen was Minister of Defence in the Cabinet of Jan P. Syse.

== Personal life ==
Ditlev-Simonsen was born in Oslo to ship owner Sverre Ditlev-Simonsen and Lily Kaurin. He was a grandson of Olaf Ditlev-Simonsen Sr, and nephew of Olaf Ditlev-Simonsen Jr. He was married to Benedicte Werring (d. 1990) from 1960, and to Turi Klaveness from 1992.

== Swiss bank account tax probe ==
In August 2007, the presence of a hitherto unknown Swiss bank account was revealed. The revelation came after an acrimonious divorce involving his daughter, Cecilie Ditlev-Simonsen, the communications director of Norsk Hydro. The account, which contained NOK 1.5 million had been inherited by Ditlev-Simonsen after his wife died in 1990, and he eventually admitted to not having paid the Norwegian wealth tax on it.

The revelation caused several opposition politicians to call for Ditlev-Simonsen's resignation. Erna Solberg, the head of the Conservative Party, asked that Ditlev- Simonsen refrain from active campaigning for his party ahead of the local elections scheduled for 10 September. Even if he had not resigned, the 75 year old Ditlev-Simonsen was set to retire after the election. The incident was believed to be a cause of the Conservative's 4 percent drop in opinion polls, three weeks ahead of the election.

Political offices
Preceded by Ann-Marit Sæbønes	Mayor of Oslo; 1995–2007	Succeeded by Svenn Erik Kristiansen
