= Svenn Kristiansen =

Norwegian politician (1940–2024)

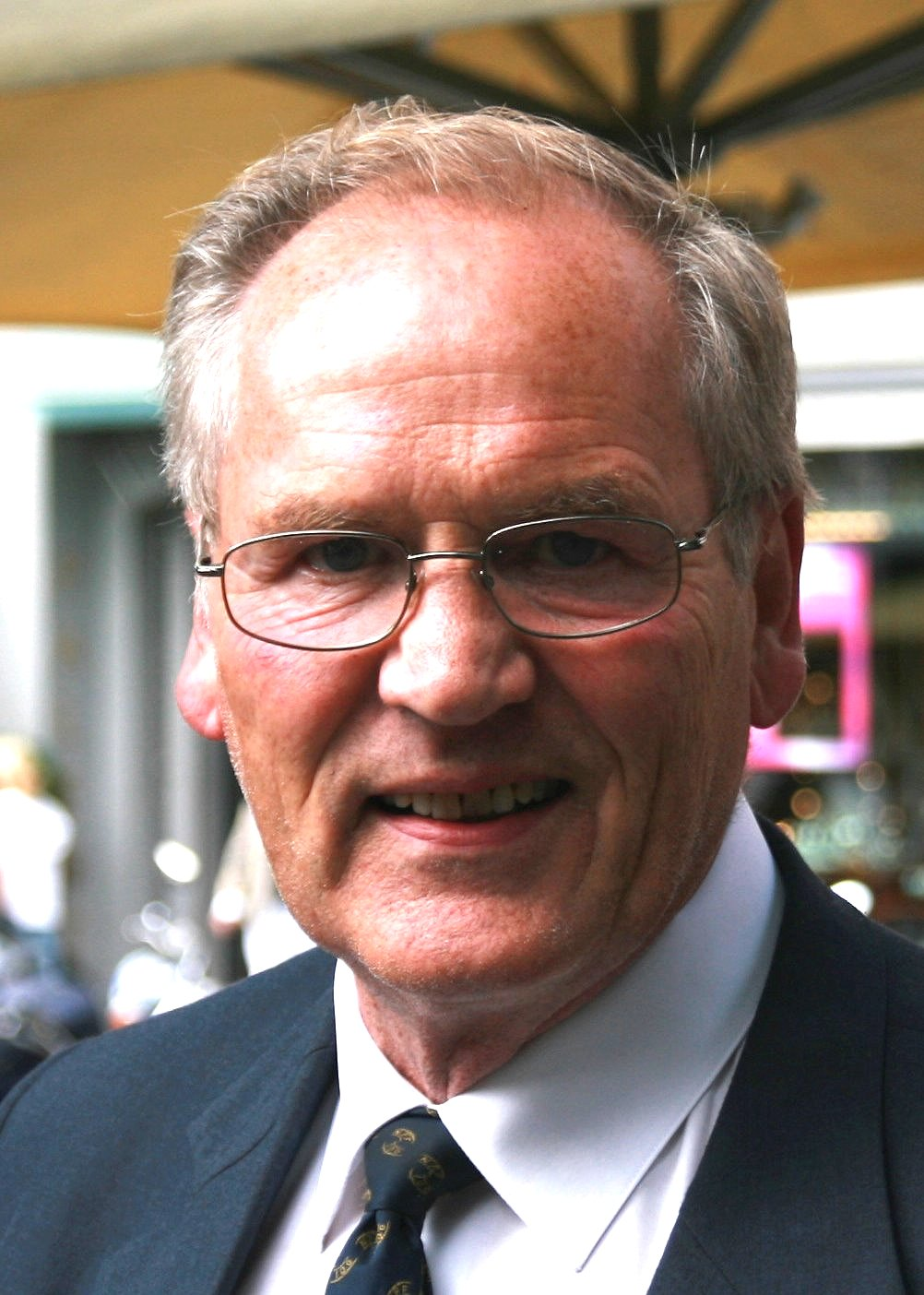

65th Mayor of Oslo
- In office 29 August 2007 – 17 October 2007
- Deputy: Himself
- Governing Mayor: Erling Lae
- Preceded by: Per Ditlev-Simonsen
- Succeeded by: Fabian Stang

Personal details
- Born: 30 May 1940
- Died: 9 June 2024 (aged 84)
- Party: Conservative

Svenn Erik Kristiansen (30 May 1940 – 9 June 2024) was a Norwegian teacher turned politician. He served as deputy mayor of Oslo for a period before becoming mayor of Oslo for a period in 2007, when Per Ditlev-Simonsen resigned. Following the 2007 Norwegian local elections, Kristiansen did not continue as mayor. He died in 2024, aged 84.

== Sources ==
- Biography (in Norwegian)

Political offices
Preceded by Per Ditlev-Simonsen	Mayor of Oslo; 2007	Succeeded by Fabian Stang
