= Kystlink =

Norwegian ferry shipping company

Nye Kystlink AS
- Company type: Subsidiary
- Industry: Ship transport
- Founded: 2006
- Defunct: 2008
- Headquarters: Langesund, Norway
- Area served: Skagerrak
- Parent: Taubåtkompaniet

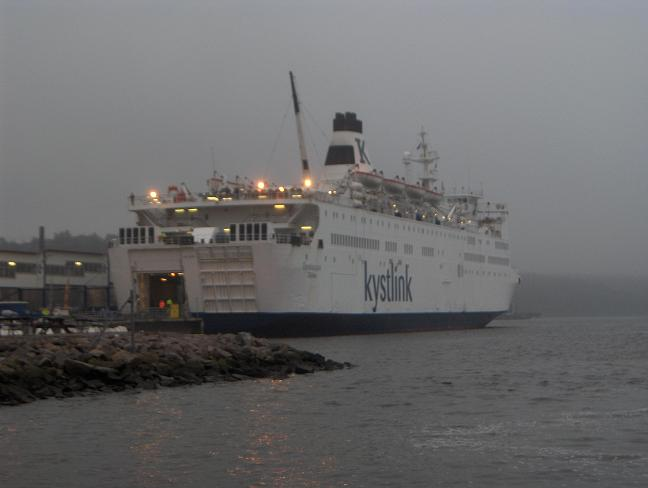
MS Kongshavn in Strömstad

Nye Kystlink AS, trading as kystlink, was a Norwegian ferry shipping company that operates between Langesund in Norway and Strömstad, Sweden and Hirtshals, Denmark. The company was wholly owned by Taubåtkompaniet, owned by Ole T. Bjørnevik, and operated one cruiseferry, MS Kongshavn. It ceased operations on 21 October 2008.

The company was established in 2006, following the bankruptcy of Kystlink AS. The company acquired MS Pride of Telemark, but the ship had an accident on 11 September 2007, and was for the rest of the company's history in dry dock. After this, Kystlink acquired MS Fantaasia from Estonian Tallink, changing the name to Kongshavn. The ship was described by Håkan Ågård in the Swedish Maritime Administration as the worst he had ever seen, with severe lacks to maintenance, though pointed out the responsibility was that of Tallink and not Kystlink. This point of view had protested by the Estonian Maritime Administration and in July 2008 supported by Paris MOU.

On October 20, 2008, the company announced that its ferry service would conclude on October 21, and the company would be liquidated.
