= MS Spero =

History

United Kingdom
- Name: MS Spero
- Owner: Ellerman Wilson Line
- Route: Kingston Upon Hull to Zeebruge, Gothenburg and London
- Builder: Camell Laird Shipsbuilders, England
- Yard number: 1322
- Laid down: 1966
- Launched: 5 May 1966
- Acquired: August 1966
- Maiden voyage: August 1966
- In service: August 1966
- Out of service: 1973
- Fate: Sold.

History

Greece
- Name: MS Sappho (Σαπφώ)
- Owner: NEL Lines
- Route: Piraeus to Chios and Mytilene
- Acquired: 1973
- Maiden voyage: 1973
- In service: 1973
- Out of service: March 2002
- Fate: Sold

General characteristics
- Type: Ro-Ro/Passenger ship
- Notes: First NEL Lines ship

MS Spero, was a British ferry ship, which was part of Ellerman Wilson's fleet. She was built by Camell Laird Shipsbuilders in 1966. She was later sold on to NEL Lines as the Sappho, and was the company's first ship. She was in use from 1973 up to 2001, when she was sold to Carra and Pontikos as the Santorini 3. She was eventually sold for scrap as the Santori.

== History ==
The construction on the ship started in 1966. Her number was 1322 and was launched in May, while in August, she was routed between Hull-Gothenburg-London, connecting England with Sweden, and later between Hull-Zeebruge and Hull-Gothenburg. On 26 April 1973 the newly founded Maritime Company of Lesvos, purchased the ship and renamed her "Sappho", after the poet with the same name. After she was purchased, she was routed between Piraeus-Chios-Mytilene, where she worked for nearly 30 years. Later, the route was expanded to Thessaloniki. On such a voyage, at 12:30 on 25 February 1999, her engine room caught fire, while sailing near Karystos. As a result, she was towed to Piraeus the next day for repairs. No casualties were reported. In March 2002, when she reached the then valid 35 year age-limit, she was sold on to the Greek company Carra & Pontikos (Lacerta Shipping), for 1.500.000 USD, with a new name "Santorini 3, sailing between Tanzania and Kenya.The route was found to be unprofitable and finally, in December 2003, she was sold for scrap to Indian scrappers and renamed "Santori" for her last voyage.

== Receptions ==
During her days in Greece, she was very successful, making 4,493 trips and carrying 5,316,981 passengers. Even later, when new, more modern ships were launched on the route (such as the MS Mytilene), she was still preferred by passengers for their travels, as she was considered better at sea and with less vibration.
