= Sverre Ditlev-Simonsen =

Norwegian ship owner and bandy player (1906–2004)

- Born: 21 May 1906; Oslo, Norway
- Died: 1 February 2004 (aged 97)
- Occupation: Ship owner
- Children: Per Ditlev-Simonsen
- Parent: Olaf Ditlev-Simonsen

Sverre Ditlev-Simonsen (21 May 1906 – 1 February 2004) was a Norwegian ship owner.

He was born in Oslo to Olaf Ditlev-Simonsen and Magdalena Pedersen, and married Lily Kaurin in 1907. They had the son Per Ditlev-Simonsen.

From 1929 Ditlev-Simonsen ran his own shipping business. He was active in organizational work, and assumed various positions in the Norwegian Shipowners' Association for more than twenty years. He was a board member of the Norwegian Maritime Museum from 1955, and chairman from 1964. He was decorated Commander of the Swedish Order of Vasa.

Ditlev-Simonsen was an active bandy player, a three times Norwegian champion.
