= Olaf Ditlev-Simonsen =

Norwegian sailor (1897–1978)

Personal information
- Full name: Olaf Christian Ditlev-Simonsen Jr.
- Born: 2 January 1897 Dybvaag Municipality, Norway
- Died: 19 February 1978 (aged 81) Oslo, Norway
Medal record
Sailing
Representing Norway
Olympic Games
Silver medal – second place	1936 Berlin	8 metre class

Olaf Christian Ditlev-Simonsen Jr. (2 January 1897 – 19 February 1978) was a Norwegian sailor, footballer, sports administrator and businessperson.

== Early and personal life ==
He was born in Dybvaag Municipality to ship-owner Olaf Ditlev-Simonsen (1865–1960) and Magdalena Pedersen (1873–1920). He had eight siblings. The family moved to Kristiania in 1902, and he joined the family's company (John P. Pedersen & Søn) after finishing Kristiania Commerce School in 1917. He was a brother of John Ditlev-Simonsen and uncle to both Halfdan Ditlev-Simonsen Jr. and Per Ditlev-Simonsen.

In 1920 he married Else Heyerdahl (1899–1985), and had Hieronymus Heyerdahl as a father-in-law. He died in January 1978 in Oslo.

== Sports career ==
Olaf Ditlev-Simonsen practised different sports in the club IF Ready, and, partly together with his four brothers, he won several Norwegian championships in bandy. Olaf Ditlev-Simonsen's first national title came in 1913, and the last in 1927. He played two matches for the national team. He was also capped five times for the Norway national football team, the first in 1915. He also competed in yacht racing. At the 1936 Summer Olympics he won the silver medal as crew member of the Norwegian boat Silja in the 8 metre event. He had taken his first King's Cup in Norway with that boat in 1930.

He was a board member of the Norwegian Tennis Federation from 1918 to 1919 and of the Football Association of Norway for four years, chaired IF Ready from 1923 to 1927 and the Royal Norwegian Yacht Club from 1947 to 1949. From 1948 to 1966 he was a member of the International Olympic Committee, and he headed the organizational committee at the 1952 Winter Olympics. In the IOC he took over for Thomas Fearnley, following tradition since 1905 that Norway must have one IOC member at any time.

== Shipping and the Second World War ==
In shipping, he started his own company in 1936. He was a board member of the Norwegian Shipowners' Association for some time, and during the Second World War he worked in Sweden, from 1943 as regional head of Nortraship. From 1945 to 1949 he chaired the supervisory council of Det Norske Veritas. Ditlev-Simonsen was amongst a number of prominent Norwegians arrested as hostages by the Germans during their occupation of Norway. Following his arrest he was transferred to Grini concentration camp on 13 January 1942 and given prisoner number 1274, being released on 21 September 1942. His brother John was also arrested and held as a hostage by the Germans.

He was decorated with the King's Medal of Merit in gold in 1947 and was a Commander of the Royal Norwegian Order of St. Olav (1952), the Order of the Lion of Finland, the Order of Vasa, the Order of the Polar Star, the Order of Merit of the Italian Republic and the Order of Orange-Nassau. He was a Knight of the Order of the Dannebrog.

Sporting positions
Preceded by Thomas Fearnley	Norway's member of the International Olympic Committee; 1948–1966	Succeeded by Jan Staubo
