= Pride of Telemark =

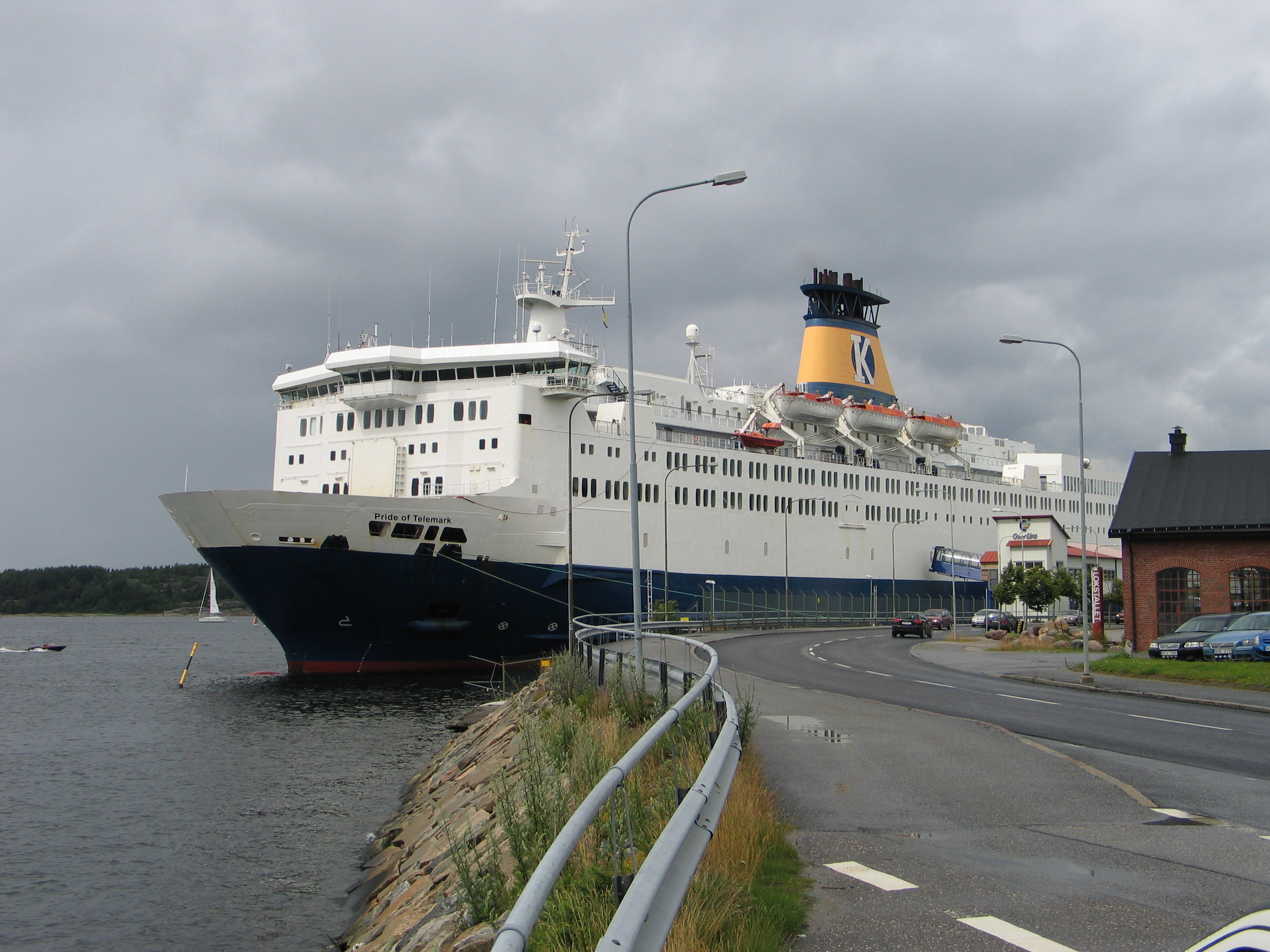
- Pride of Telemark in Strömstad

History
- Name: Stena Jutlandica (1983–1996); Stena Empereur (1996–1998); P&OSL Provence (1998–2002); PO Provence (2002–2003); Pride of Provence (2003–2004); Alkmini A (2004–2005); Pride of Telemark (2005–2011); Telemark (2011–2011)
- Owner: Stena Line (1983–1998); P&O Stena Line (1998–2002); P&O Ferries (2002–2004); GA Ferries (2004–2011); BOA Holding (2011–2011)
- Operator: Stena Line (1983–1998); P&O Stena Line (1998–2002); P&O Ferries (2002–2004); Kystlink (2005–2009)
- Launched: 22 December 1980
- Completed: 1983
- Maiden voyage: 1983
- In service: 1983
- Out of service: 2011
- Identification: IMO number: 7907257
- Fate: Scrapped 27 October 2011.

General characteristics
- Tonnage: 28,559 GT
- Length: 156.2 m (512.5 ft)
- Beam: 28.4 m (93.2 ft)
- Draught: 6.3 m (20.7 ft)
- Speed: 19 kn (35.2 km/h)
- Capacity: 2,204 passengers; 550 cars

Pride of Telemark was a ferry which previously sailed between Dover and Calais for P&O Ferries and Stena Line.

== History ==
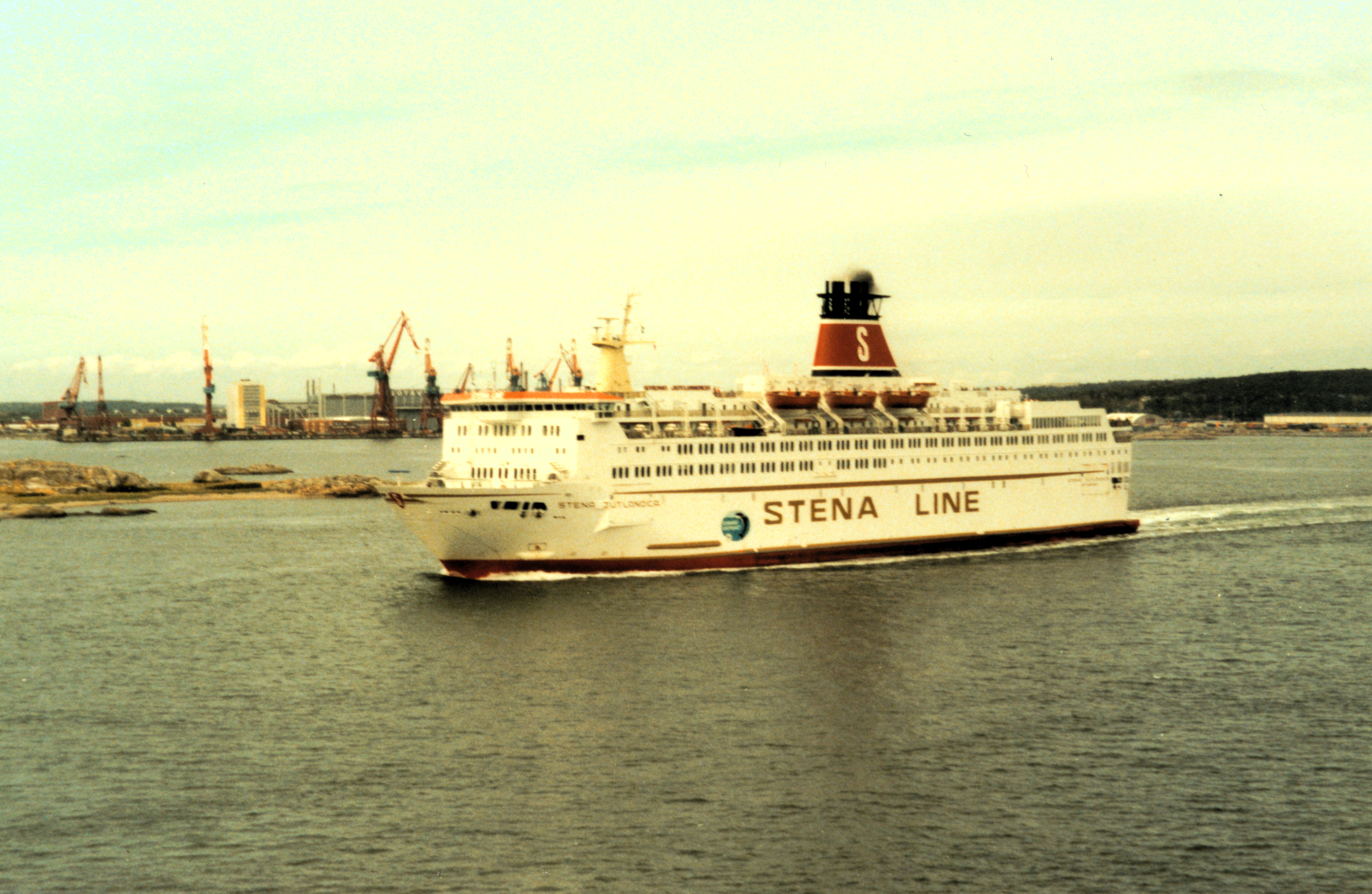
Stena Jutlandica in 1984

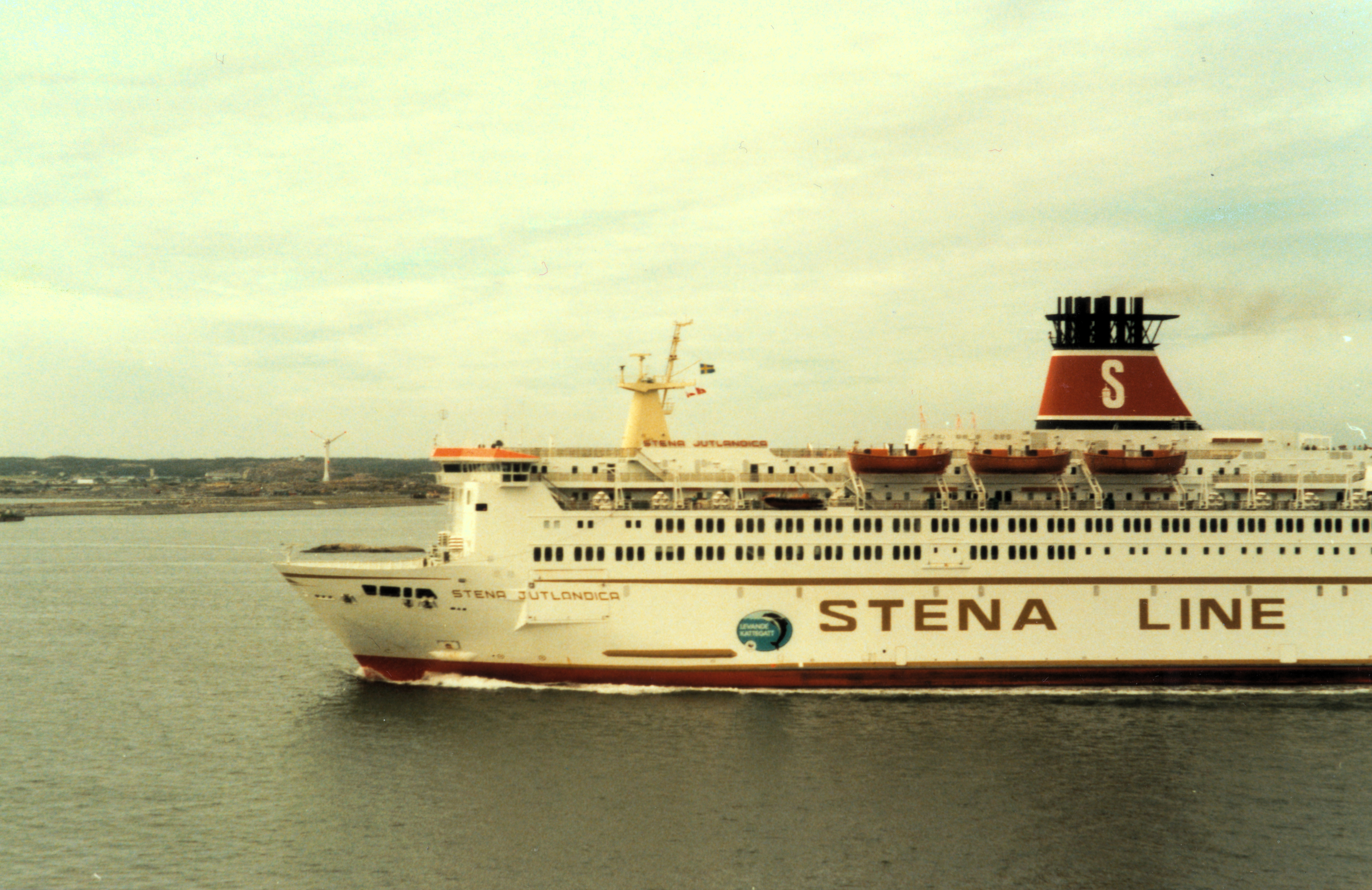
Stena Jutlandica in 1984

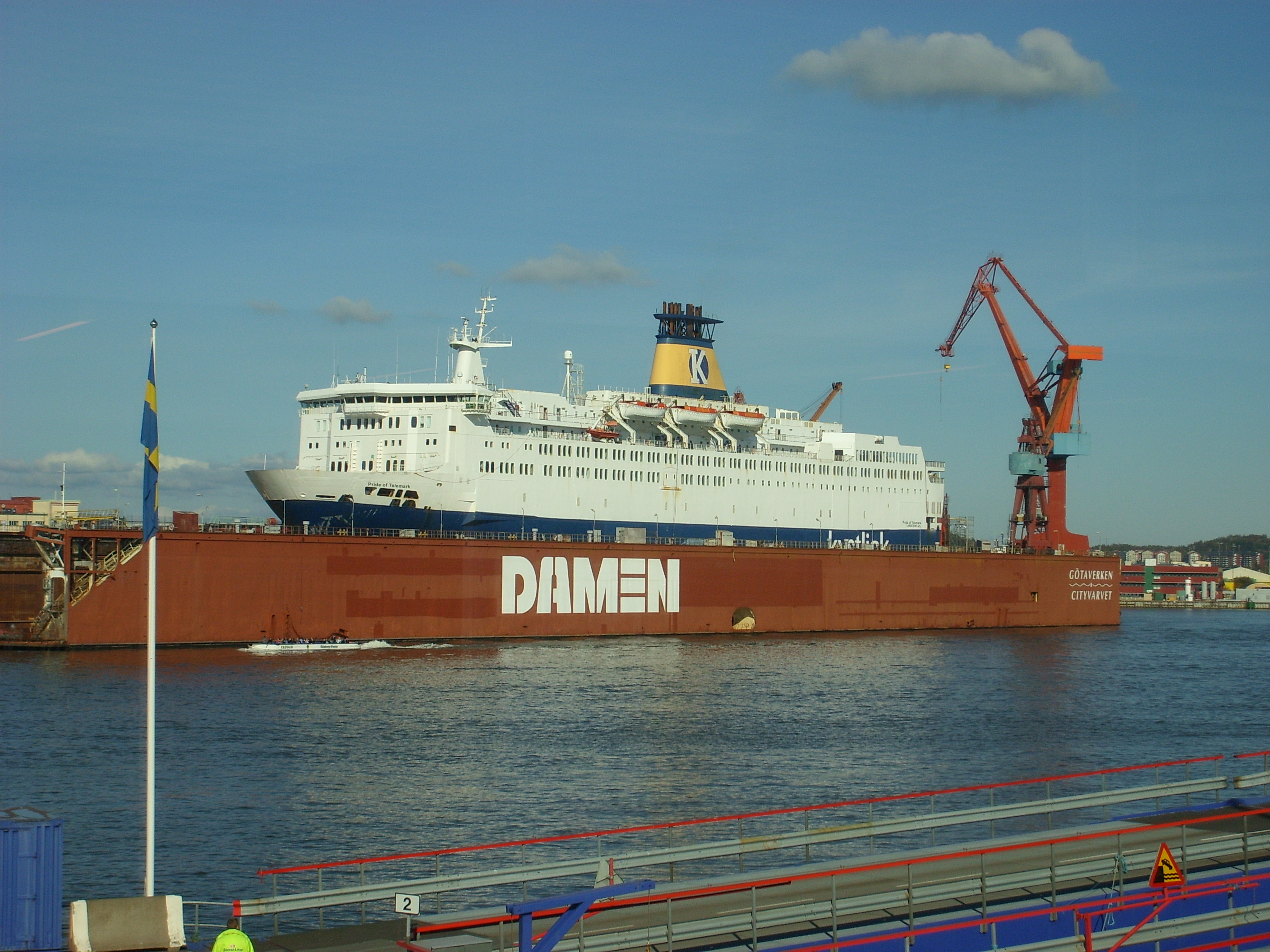
Pride of Telemark in October 2007

Built at Chantiers de France, Dunkerque and completed in 1983 as the Stena Jutlandica she sailed for Stena Line between Gothenburg and Frederikshavn until 1996 when she was replaced by a new ferry of the same name. She was transferred to Stena Line's UK operation for service between Dover and Calais. Prior to entering service on this route she was refitted to allow vehicles to enter her upper vehicle deck through the bow and stern. During this refit she was renamed Stena Empereur. When P&O European Ferries and Stena Line's Dover-Calais operations merged she kept her Stena name for a short time before being renamed P&OSL Provence in 1998. When P&O bought Stena Line's share of P&O Stena Line in 2002 the P&OSL Provence briefly carried the name PO Provence before being repainted in the new P&O Ferries livery and becoming the Pride of Provence in 2003. In late 2004 she was withdrawn from service and laid up for sale as part of a business review. She was sold to GA Ferries of Greece and became the Alkmini A. Despite undergoing a refit for GA Ferries she never entered service with them but was instead chartered to Kystlink of Norway. She is now named Pride of Telemark. In 2007, she collided with the harbour at Hirtshals. She was repaired and continued her service.

In September 2011 the Pride of Telemark departed Farsund for scrapping in Alang, India.

== Routes served ==
- Gothenburg–Frederikshavn. Stena Line 1983–1996
- Dover–Calais Stena Line 1996–1998
- Dover–Calais P&O Stena Line 1998–2002
- Dover–Calais P&O Ferries 2002–2004
- Langesund–Strömstad Kystlink 2005–2009
