= Moby Drea =

Cruiseferry owned by Moby Lines

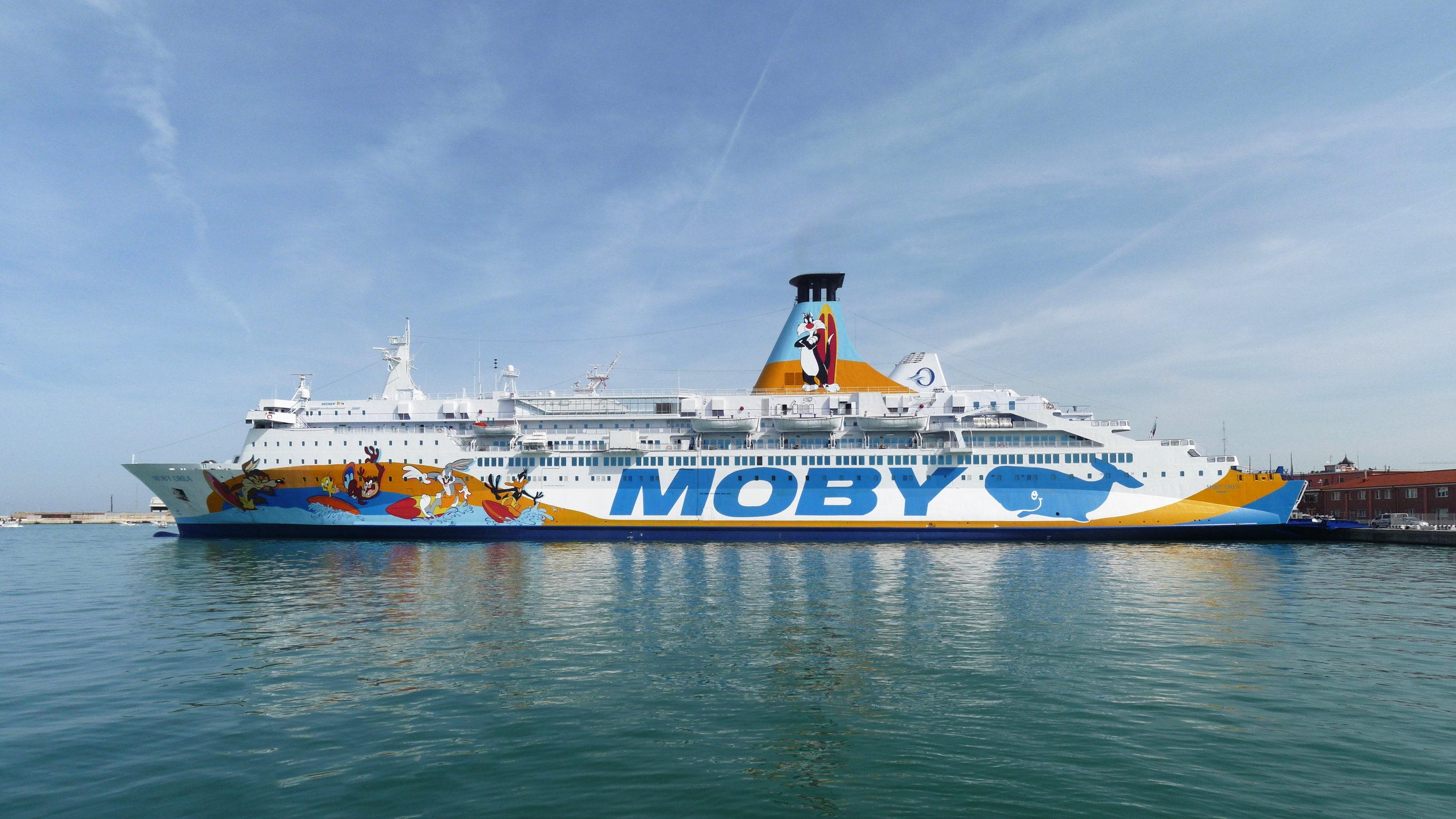
- Moby Drea in Livorno

History
- Name: 1975-1982: Tor Britannia; 1991-2006: Prince of Scandinavia; 2006-present: Moby Drea
- Owner: 1975-1981: Tor Line; 1981-1983: DFDS; 1983-1991: Difko XXXIII; 1991-2006: DFDS; 2006-present: Moby Lines
- Operator: 1975-1980: Tor Line; 1980-1981: Sessan Tor Line; 1981: Tor Line; 1981-2006: DFDS Seaways; 2006-present: Moby Lines
- Port of registry: 1975-1981: Gothenburg, Sweden; 1981-1990: Esbjerg, Denmark; 1990-2003: Copenhagen, Denmark; 2003-2025: Naples, Italy
- Builder: Flender Werke, Lübeck, West Germany
- Laid down: 21 January 1974
- Christened: 10 October 1974 by Barbro Salén
- Acquired: 16 May 1975
- In service: 21 May 1975
- Out of service: November 2024
- Identification: IMO number: 7361312; MMSI number: 247162200; Callsign: IBQI
- Fate: Scrapped at Aliaga in 2025
- Notes: Sister ship to Moby Otta

General characteristics (as built)
- Tonnage: 15,673 GRT; 3,290 tonnes deadweight (DWT)
- Length: 182.26 meters
- Beam: 23.62 meters
- Draught: 6.20 meters
- Installed power: 4 × Pielstick PC3 12 V480 diesels; 33540 kW
- Speed: 27.2 knots
- Capacity: 1507 passengers; 1416 beds; 420 passenger cars; 910 lanemeters

General characteristics (after 1998 refit)
- Tonnage: 21,545 GT; 3,335 DWT
- Length: 184.55 meters
- Beam: 26.40 meters
- Draught: 6.20 meters
- Capacity: 1507 passengers; 1617 beds; 420 passenger cars; 910 lanemeters

General characteristics
- Capacity: 1900 passengers; 500 passenger cars

Moby Drea is a cruiseferry, currently owned by Moby Lines and operated on its Genoa to Olbia service. It was built in 1975 by Flender Werke, Lübeck, West Germany as Tor Britannia for Tor Line. Between 1991 and 2003 it sailed as Prince of Scandinavia.

== History ==
Tor Line was established in 1966 by two Swedish companies to operate car-passenger services between Sweden, England and the Netherlands with modern car-passenger ferries. By the early 1970s Tor Line had essentially defeated their main competitors on the route, Rederi AB Svea and Swedish Lloyd. To consolidate their leading position the company decided to order a pair of new state-of-the-art ferries for the service. The new ships were to be the fastest ferries in the world, as well as largest, except for the Soviet Union's Belorussiya class ships.

Tor Britannia was delivered on 16 May 1975 and entered service on 21 May. Sister ship Tor Scandinavia was delivered on 12 April 1976. The two ships revolutionized trans-North Sea traffic, being capable of speeds in excess of 27 knots and offering services hitherto unknown on ferries in that route. Although technically modern in many ways, the ships' exteriors were quite traditional in their style, reminiscent more of ocean liners than ferries. The sole exception to this were two massive loading ramps in the rear of the ship, which were necessary as the ships had no forward car-gate (just a small car door on the forward starboard side for upper car deck exit only) for safety reasons.

During their service with Tor Line, the two ships alternated on the Gothenburg to Felixstowe and Gothenburg to Amsterdam services.

It soon turned out there weren't in fact enough passengers for both new ships during the winter season. As a result, Tor Line chartered the Tor Scandinavia as an expo ship in January–February 1979 (to Holland Expo for use in the Middle East), again in January–April 1980 (to Scan-Arab Expo for a fair cruise around the Middle East and Asia) and again in December 1980 – April 1981 (again to Holland Expo for use in the Middle East). The winter passenger numbers weren't the only problem, and Tor Line started looking to form a partnership with another shipping company. In January 1980 Sessan Tor Line was formed as a collaborative company between Tor Line and Sessan Line, another Swedish company that had traffic between Gothenburg and Frederikshavn, Denmark. As a result, Sessan Line's mermaid-logo was added alongside Tor Line's logo in the Tor ships' funnels. Sessan Tor Line proved to be short-lived however, and in April 1981 the collaboration ended.

In December 1981 Tor Line was sold to DFDS. The only immediate change was that the ships' home port was altered from Gothenburg to Esbjerg, Denmark. They soon received DFDS's white hull and dark funnel colours (as opposed to the dark hull and white funnel of Tor Line), but were officially marketed as DFDS Tor Line ships due to the good reputation of Tor Line in Sweden. In 1983 DFDS decided to abandon the line to Amsterdam completely, and use only one ship—Tor Scandinavia—on the Gothenburg to Harwich route, whereas the Tor Britannia sailed from Harwich to Esbjerg.

In 1988 DFDS adopted a new marketing name, Scandinavian Seaways, for their passenger division. As a result, the Tor Britannia was painted in a new, attractive white/blue livery, but the change also meant disappearance of the name Tor Line from its hull. In the same year the ship was moved to Danish International Shipregistry, which meant lower operational costs for the company.

In 1990 it received a new name, Prince of Scandinavia, to bring it in line with Scandinavian Seaways' other ships.

In 2006 Moby Lines took over the Prince of Scandinavia in Frederikshavn, Denmark, and it was renamed Moby Drea. Originally it was reported that the Moby Drea would open a new route for Moby Lines, connecting Genoa and Porto Torres. With the Moby Otta it soperated on the Livorno to Genoa route from the end of may until the end of October. The last years of service she has been deployed on the Genoa-Olbia route with her sister, until spring 2025 when sold for scrapping in Aliağa, Turkey. Turkish authorities reportedly demanded that vessel first get cleaned of tons of built-in asbestos. This was to be done by the Brodosplit shipyard, thus the vessel was towed to Split, Croatia in July. By then it has got a new proprietor, Italian company Med Fuel Bunkering from Messina which planned to have the vessel refurbished in a shipyard in Piraeus, Greece. However, the protests by the local population and authorities in Split resulted in prohibition of asbestos removal and the vessel was towed from Split on 2 September in the evening. The vessel, by then named only Drea, was tied in the port of Taranto, Italy for weeks until on 30 October Italian media reported that the authorities approved removal of asbestos and its appropriate treatment.
