= Blue Line International =

Ferry company

- Industry: Passenger transportation Freight transportation
- Predecessor: SEM Maritime Company
- Founded: 2003
- Defunct: 2014
- Fate: merged with Pico ferries
- Area served: Adriatic Sea
- Owner: SEM Maritime Company
- Website: www.blueline-ferries.com

Blue Line International was a ferry company owned by the Croatia-based SEM Maritime Company (SMC). The Blue Line brand was established in 2003 as a marketing name for SMC's Croatia—Italy services, coinciding with the purchase of the MV Ancona.

The company operated a regular around-the-year service between Ancona and Split, alongside the seasonal lines Ancona—Hvar and Ancona—Vis.
