= Elpis (ship) =

Car ferry launched in 1976

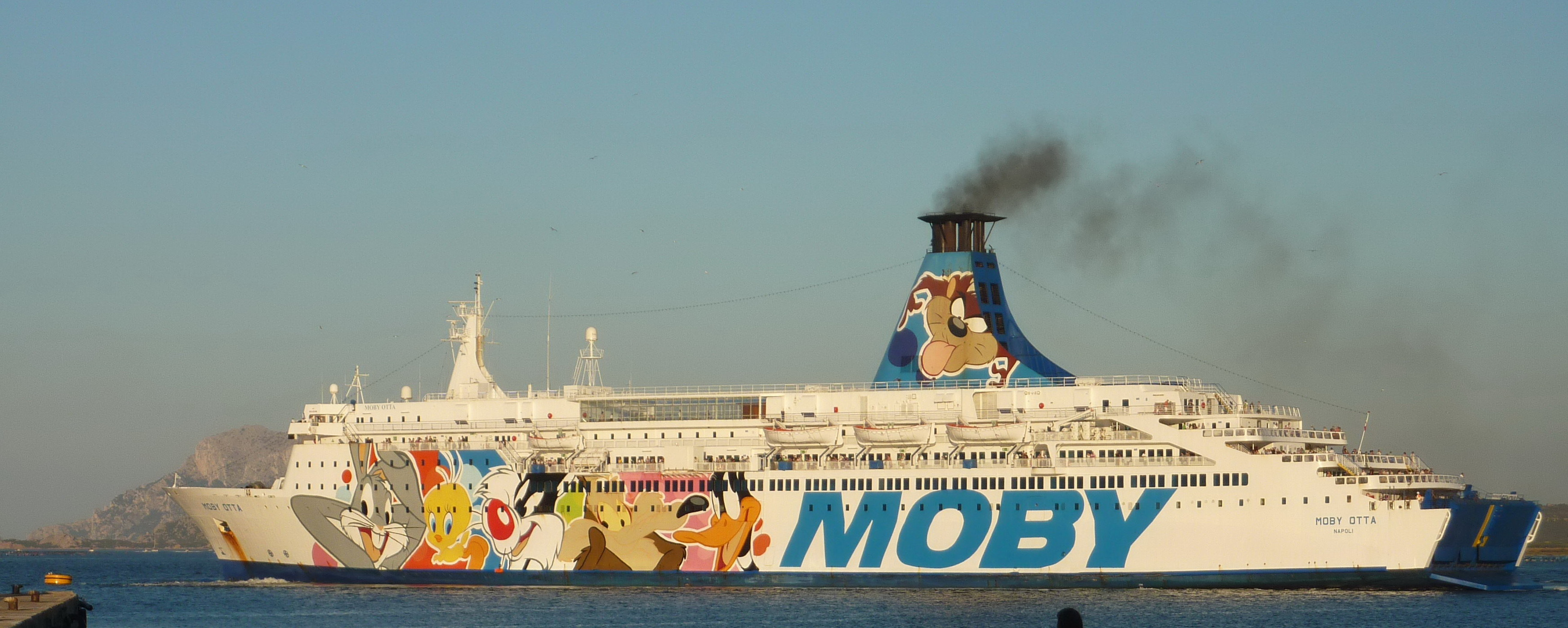
- Moby Otta in Olbia in 2013

History
- Name: 1976-1982: Tor Scandinavia; 1982-1983: World Wide Expo; 1983-1991: Tor Scandinavia; 1991-2006: Princess of Scandinavia; 2006-2026: Moby Otta; 2025-:Elpis
- Owner: 1976-1981: Tor Line; 1981-1983: DFDS; 1983-1991: Difko XXXIII; 1991-2006: DFDS; 2006-2025: Moby Lines; 2025-: Hoiyu International Group
- Operator: 1976-1980: Tor Line; 1980-1981: Sessan Tor Line; 1981: Tor Line; 1981-2006: DFDS Seaways; 2006-present: Moby Lines
- Port of registry: 1976-1981: Gothenburg, Sweden; 1981-1991: Esbjerg, Denmark; 1991-2006: Copenhagen, Denmark; 2006-present: Naples, Italy
- Builder: Flender Werke, Lübeck, West Germany
- Yard number: 608
- Laid down: 2 April 1975
- Launched: 4 November 1975
- Christened: 15 April 1976by Jennifer Wilson
- Acquired: 12 April 1976
- In service: 15 April 1976
- Identification: IMO number: 7361324
- Fate: Good End
- Status: In service
- Notes: Sister ship to Moby Drea

General characteristics (as built)
- Tonnage: 15673 GRT 3,290 DWT
- Length: 182.26 meters
- Beam: 23.62 meters
- Draught: 6.20 meters
- Installed power: 4 × Pielstick PC3 12 V480 diesels; 33540 kW
- Speed: 27.2 knots
- Capacity: 1507 passengers; 1416 beds; 420 passenger cars; 910 lanemeters

General characteristics (after 1998 refit)
- Tonnage: 22528 gt 3,335 DWT
- Length: 184.55 meters
- Beam: 26.40 meters
- Draught: 6.20 meters
- Capacity: 1507 passengers; 1617 beds; 420 passenger cars; 910 lanemeters

General characteristics (after 2007 refit)
- Capacity: 1900 passengers; 500 passenger cars

Elpis, formerly Moby Otta is a cruiseferry. Formerly owned by the Italy-based shipping company Moby Lines and operated on their Genoa–Olbia service. She was built in 1976 by Flender Werke, Lübeck, West Germany as Tor Scandinavia for Tor Line. Between 1991 and 2006 she sailed as Princess of Scandinavia.

== History ==
=== Tor Line service ===
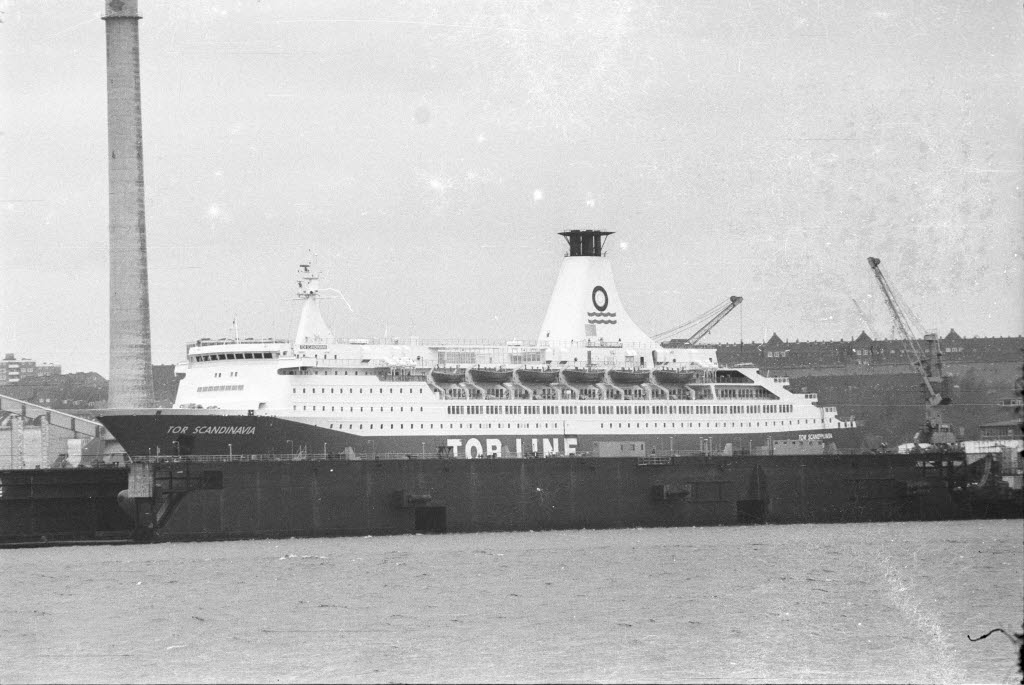
Tor Scandinavia in Kiel in 1977

Tor Line had been established in 1966 by two Swedish companies to operate car-passenger services between Sweden, England and the Netherlands with modern car-passenger ferries. By the early 1970s Tor Line had essentially defeated their main competitors on the route, Rederi AB Svea and Swedish Lloyd. To consolidate their leading position the company decided to order a pair of new state-of-the-art ferries for the service. The new ships were to be the fastest ferries in the world, as well as largest, except for the Soviet Union's Belorussiya class ships.

The first sister, Tor Britannia, was delivered in May 1975. Just a month earlier the keel had been laid for the second sister, to be called Tor Scandinavia. Tor Scandinavia was eventually delivered on April 12, 1976. The two ships revolutionized trans-North Sea traffic, being capable of speeds in excess of 27 knots and offering services hitherto unknown on ferries in that route. Although technically modern in many ways, the ships' exteriors were quite traditional in their style, reminiscent more of ocean liners than ferries. The sole exception to this were two massive loading ramps in the rear of the ship, which were necessary as the ships had no forward car-gate (just a small car door on the forward starboard side for upper car deck exit only) for safety reasons.

For all of its service with Tor Line, the Tor Scandinavia alternated with its sister on the routes Gothenburg–Immingham (later Felixstowe) and Gothenburg–Amsterdam. Already in autumn 1976 the ship had her first major accident, when she ran into a major storm on the North Sea. Nine windows were smashed and the ship started taking in water from the forward air intakes on the superstructure. Eventually the ship arrived in Amsterdam approximately 18 hours behind schedule.

It soon turned out there weren't in fact enough passengers for both new ships during the winter season. As a result, Tor Line chartered the Tor Scandinavia as an expo-ship in January–February 1979 (to Holland Expo for use in the Middle East), again in January–April 1980 (to Scan-Arab Expo for a fair cruise around the Middle East and Asia) and again in December 1980 – April 1981 (again to Holland Expo for use in the Middle East). The winter passenger numbers weren't the only problem, and Tor Line started looking to form a partnership with another shipping company. In January 1980 Sessan Tor Line was formed as a collaborative company between Tor Line and Sessan Line, another Swedish company that had traffic between Gothenburg and Frederikshavn, Denmark. As a result, Sessan Line's mermaid-logo was added alongside Tor Line's logo in the Tor ships' funnels. Sessan Tor Line proved to be short-lived however, and in April 1981 the collaboration ended.

=== DFDS / Scandinavian Seaways service ===
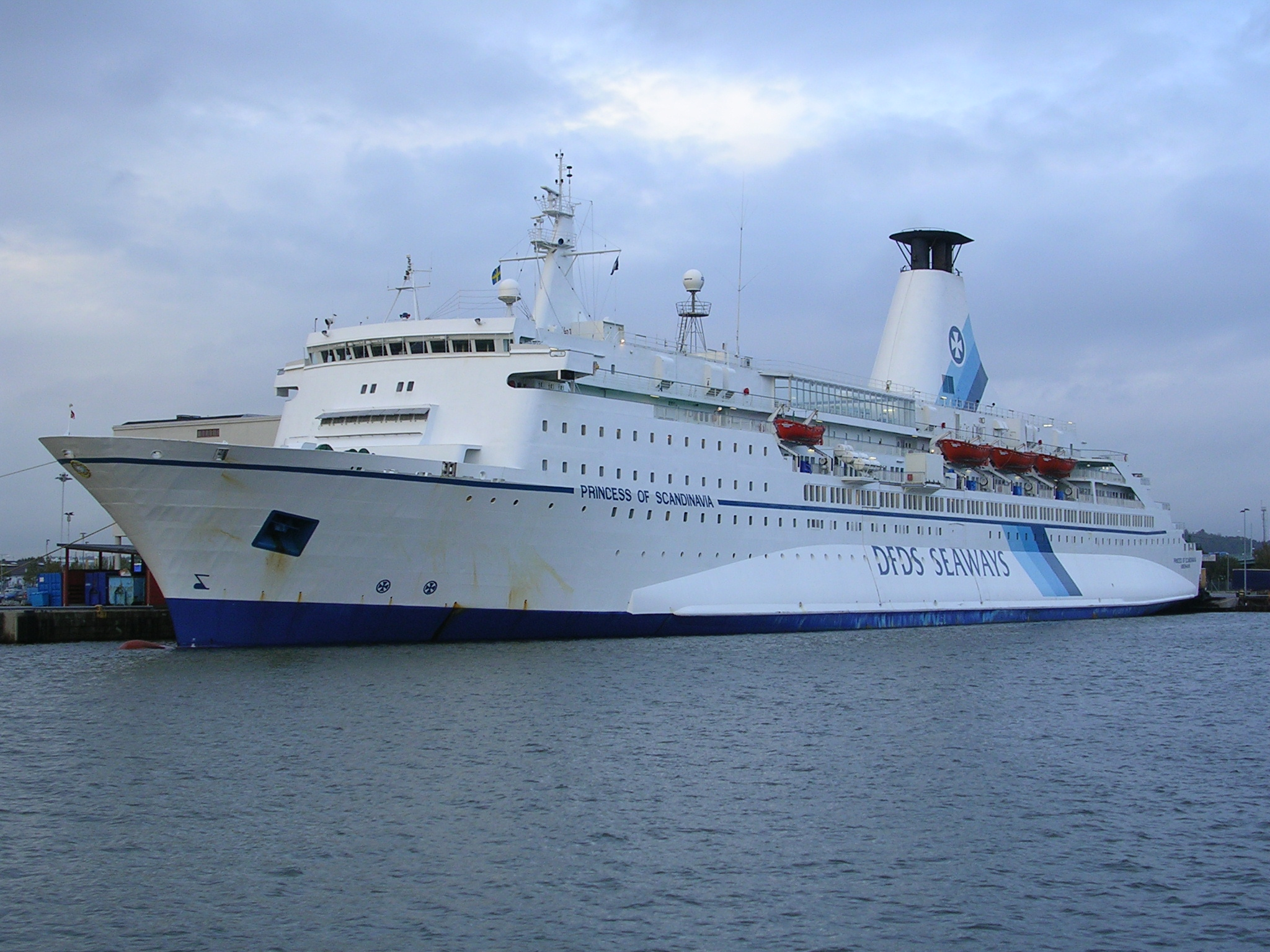
Princess of Scandinavia in Gothenburg in 2006

In December 1981 Tor Line was sold to the Danish company DFDS. The only immediate change for Tor Scandinavia was that her homeport was altered from Gothenburg to Esbjerg, Denmark. She soon received DFDS's white hull and dark funnel colours (as opposed to the dark hull and white funnel of Tor Line), however she was officially marketed as a DFDS Tor Line ship due to the good reputation of Tor Line in Sweden. Between October 1982 and February 1983 Tor Scandinavia was again chartered as an expo-ship to Dutch companies. This time her name was temporarily changed to World Wide Expo and she sailed extensively in Asia and the Middle East. After the end of the charter she returned to Sweden–England traffic, although the English terminus was altered from Felixstowe to Harwich. Later in the same year DFDS decided to abandon the line to Amsterdam completely, and use only one ship—Tor Scandinavia—on the Gothenburg to Harwich route, whereas the Tor Britannia sailed from Harwich to Esbjerg. In 1981, Tor Scandinavia also starred in the BBC soap opera Triangle, which was shot entirely on board the ship. For the second and third series the DFDS ship, Dana Anglia was used instead due to a greater amount of time in port which made recording easier.

In 1988 DFDS adopted a new marketing name, Scandinavian Seaways, for their passenger division. As a result, the Tor Scandinavia was painted in a new, attractive white-and-blue livery, but the change also meant disappearance of the name Tor Line from her hull. However, she and her sister did still retain their original names. In the same year the ship was moved to Danish International Shipregistry, which meant less operational costs for the company.

In 1989 Scandinavian Seaways decided to start trafficking from Gothenburg to Amsterdam again, so from February 1989 onwards Tor Scandinavia alternated on the routes Gothenburg–Harwich and Gothenburg–Amsterdam. In September of the same year a fire broke out on board during a crossing to Harwich, and the ship was forced to sail to Esbjerg instead. From there she continued to Nobiskrug, Rendsburg, Germany for repairs. During the 1990 summer season the ship's route was altered to Gothenburg–Newcastle, and from August 1990 onwards to Gothenburg–Harwich–Esbjerg, alongside the old Gothenburg–Amsterdam service.

During January and February 1991 the Tor Scandinavia was rebuilt at Blohm + Voss, Hamburg, Germany. After the rebuilding she received a new name, Princess of Scandinavia, to bring her name in-line with Scandinavian Seaways' other ships (her sister had been renamed Prince of Scandinavia a few months earlier). In 1994 the ship occasionally sailed between Kristiansand, Norway, and IJmuiden, the Netherlands. In June of the same year problems with one of the propellers meant the ship's speed was limited to 15 knots (28 km/h). While docked in Kristiansand to fix the problem the ship capsized, causing extensive damage.

To conform to new safety regulations the Princess of Scandinavia was rebuilt with side sponsons in January–March 1998 at Gdańsk Shipyard, Gdańsk, Poland. From the same year onwards her itineraries also changed somewhat: she served Gothenburg–Harwich all year round, but alongside that she served Gothenburg–Copenhagen during the winter season and Gothenburg–Newcastle during the summer season. In 1999 DFDS abandoned the marketing name Scandinavian Seaways and the company name reverted to DFDS Seaways. In March 2000 the ship's itineraries were changed again, from thereon she served Gothenburg–Kristiansand–Newcastle all year round. The route change was partially dictated by the end of tax free sales in intra-EU traffic, as calling in Norway allowed the continuation of tax free sales on board.

During a crossing to Kristiansand in the night between May 17 and 18, 2002, a fire broke out in the ship's engine room between the two main engines and spread to the funnel. The fire was put in the morning of the 18th, and the ship could continue its journey towards Kristiansand. Between May 21 and June 14 the ship was repaired at Fredericia shipyard, Fredericia, Denmark, after which she was back in normal traffic.

The ship spent January 2004 laid up in Gothenburg where her interiors were brought up to date. In January 2005 she was again rebuilt, this time with a new sprinkler system and catalytic converters, and her cabins and public areas were upgraded. However, despite these changes the end was near for the ship's service with DFDS. She spent January 2006 laid up in Gothenburg, after which she momentarily served on the Newcastle–IJmuiden route during the time when the Duke of Scandinavia had already been chartered to Brittany Ferries, but her replacement King of Scandinavia was not yet ready for service. After this brief stint on the Dutch service Princess returned to Gothenburg–Kristiansand–Newcastle service. At this time (possibly earlier?) a 23-hour cruise from Gothenburg to Kristiansand and back was done every Friday.

On September 6, 2006, DFDS Seaways reported that it had purchased Fjord Norway from the Norway-based Fjord Line, and would be continuing the ship's traffic from the UK to Norway. As a result of this the Princess of Scandinavia was sold and would stop trading for DFDS on 1 November of the same year. The buyer was later revealed to be Italian Moby Lines, who had already bought the Princess' sister in 2003. When the Princess of Scandinavia was taken out of service, it marked the end of 160 years of direct passenger ship traffic between Sweden and Great Britain (apart from the years during WW2 when then this route was also closed). The vessel was withdrawn due to its age and high fuel consumption.

=== Moby Lines service ===
On 2 November 2006 Moby Lines took over the Princess of Scandinavia in Frederikshavn, Denmark, and she was renamed Moby Otta. Between November 2006 and May 2007 she was rebuilt with a higher car-capacity and her cabin arrangements were altered. Originally, it was reported that the Moby Otta would open a new route for Moby Lines, connecting Genoa and Porto Torres. With her sister Moby Drea she serves on the Livorno–Genoa route from the end of May until the end of October.

In September 2010, two tourists were killed in an accident as a vehicle ramp was moved whilst they were driving off the Moby Otta in Genoa.

In October 2025 it was sold to Hoiyu International Group and renamed Elpis, it will serve as a floating hotel and casino in Malaysia.
