= MS Tor Hollandia =

Ro-ro/passenger ship built in 1967

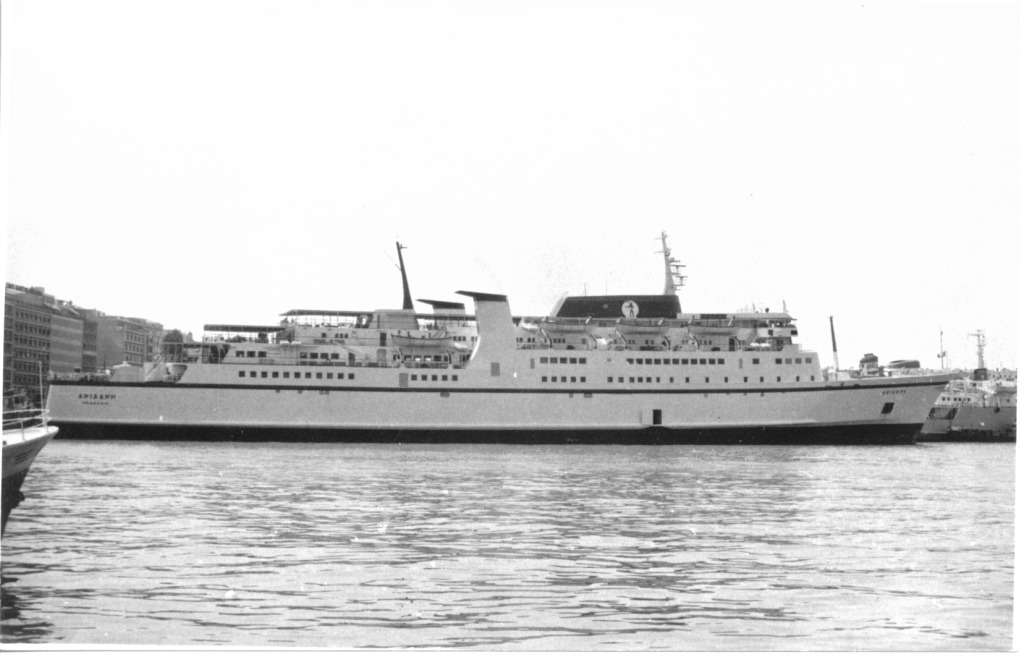
- As Ariadne, at Piraeus in 1984.

History

Sweden
- Name: Tor Hollandia (1966–1975); Ariadne (1975–1999); Ouranos (1999–2007); F. Diamond (2007–2010); Diamond (2010)
- Owner: Tor Line (1975–99); Minoan Lines (1975–1999); Fragmar Shipping Co (1999–2007); F. Lines (2007–2010); Cemsan Gemi Sokum (2010)
- Port of registry: Gothenburg, Sweden (1966–1975); Heraklion, Greece (1975–1999); Valletta, Malta (1999–2010)
- Builder: Lübecker Flender-Werke Lübeck, Germany
- Yard number: 559
- Laid down: June 1966
- Launched: 12 November 1966
- In service: 17 April 1967
- Out of service: January 2001
- Identification: IMO number: 6704402
- Fate: Scrapped at Aliağa, Turkey in 2010

General characteristics
- Type: Cruiseferry
- Tonnage: 7,748 GRT, 2,251 NRT, 3,076 DWT (1966–91); 11,621 GT, 2,250 DWT (1991–2010)
- Length: 138.00 metres (452 ft 9 in)
- Beam: 21.50 metres (70 ft 6 in)
- Draught: 5.50 metres (18 ft 1 in)
- Installed power: Pielstick 12PC2V-400 diesel engine 18,390 kilowatts (24,660 hp)
- Speed: 22 knots (41 km/h; 25 mph)
- Capacity: 980 passengers, 472 cabins, 300 cars (1966–91); 1,620 passengers, 550 cabins, 280 cars (1991–2010)

MS Tor Hollandia was built in 1966 and launched and christened by Godother Huck Van Rietscoten. She was introduced on the Tor Line service from Immingham to Amsterdam and Gothenburg. She was operated under three additional names (Ariadne, Ouranos, and F Diamond), before being sold for scrap in 2010.

== Description ==
The ship was built as yard number 559 by Lübecker Flender-Werke Lübeck, West Germany. She was 138.00 metres (452 ft 9 in) with a beam of 21.50 metres (70 ft 6 in) and a draught of 5.50 metres (18 ft 1 in). She was powered by a Pielstick 12PC2V-400 diesel engine of 18,390 kilowatts (24,660 hp) which drove a single screw propeller. It could propel the ship at 24.0 knots (44.4 km/h; 27.6 mph).

As built, she could carry 980 passengers and had 472 cabins. She could carry 300 cars.

== History ==
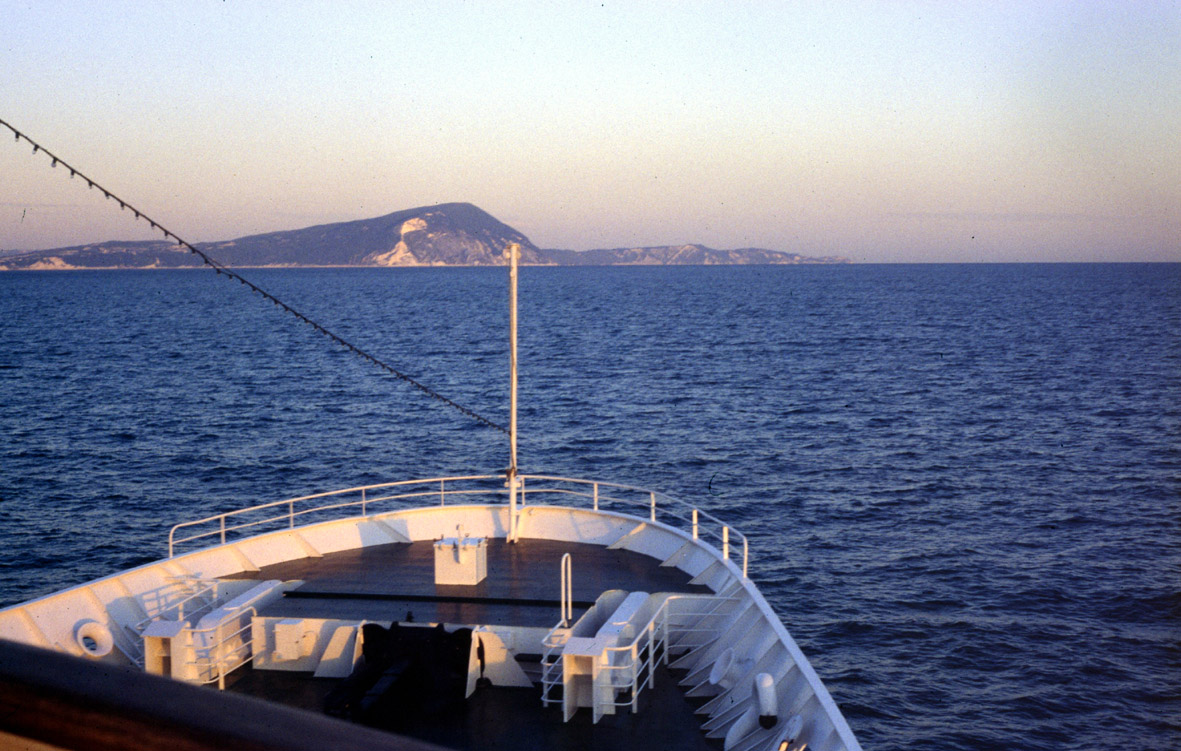
Ariadne's bow

Tor Hollandia was launched on 12 November 1966 by Huck van Rietschoten, her sponsor. She was delivered to Tor Line on 12 April 1967. Her port of registry was Gothenburg, Sweden and the IMO Number 6704402 was allocated. She entered service on 17 April 1967 providing passenger service between Immingham, United Kingdom, Amsterdam, Netherlands and Gothenburg, Sweden. In 1975 she was due to be sold to an Arab shipping company with which Tor Line would co-operate. She was to have been called Saudi Moon and operate between Jeddah and Suez. However, the negotiations dragged on over time and a Greek shipping company, Minoan Lines became interested and bought her in October 1975. She was renamed Ariadne. She was reflagged to Greece, with Heraklion as her port of registry. Under this new career she served for the next 24 years sailing on almost all of Minoan's routes. In 1991, she was rebuilt to provide more cabin space. After rebuilding she was assessed at 11,621 GT and 2,250 DWT. She could carry 1,620 passengers in 556 cabins, and could carry 280 cars. In 1997, she was chartered by the General National Maritime Co., Tripoli, Libya for service between Tripoli and Valletta, Malta.

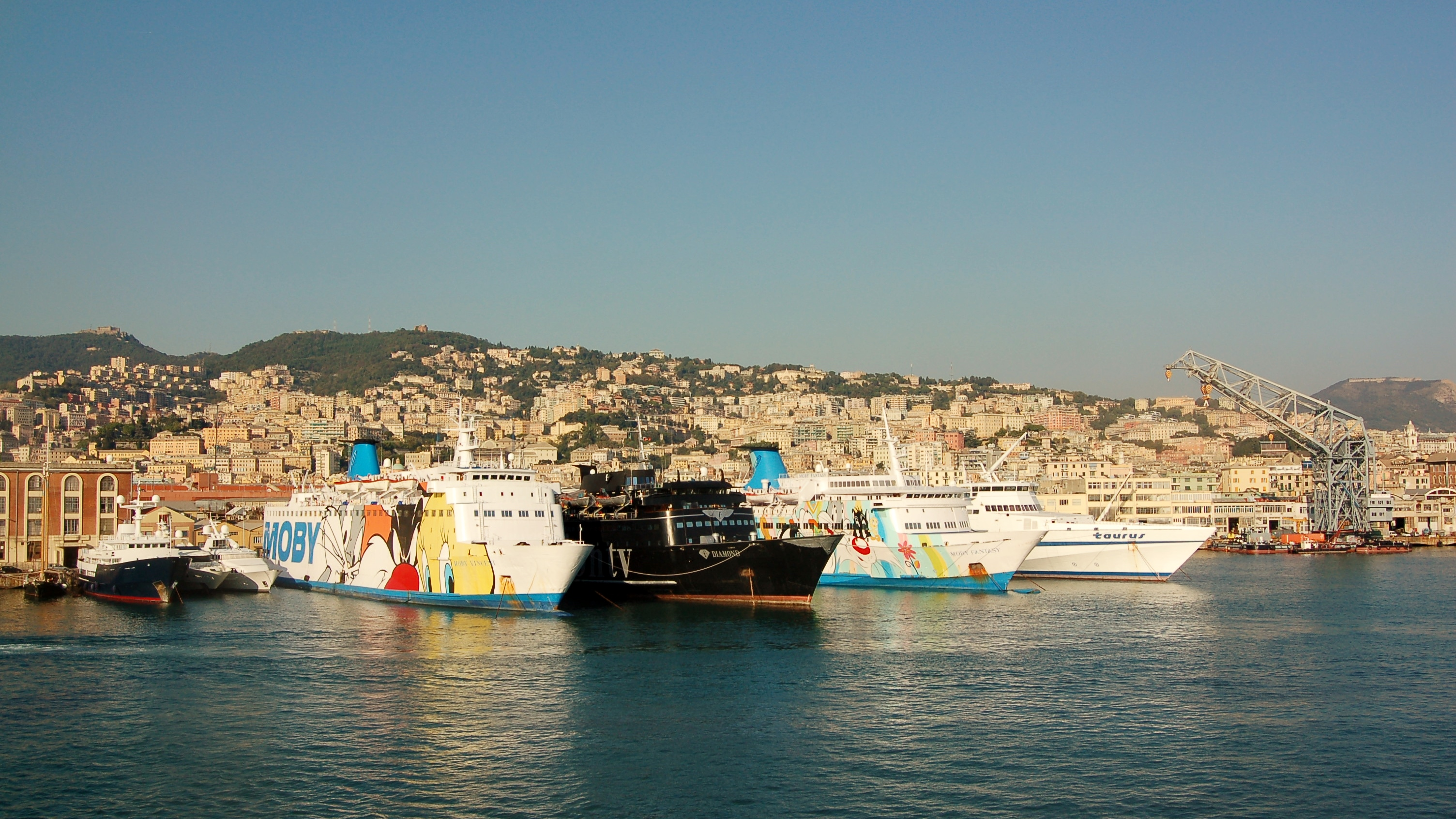
F. Diamond at Genoa in 2009

In 1999, Ariadne was sold to Fragmar Shipping Co., Valletta, Malta. She was reflagged to Malta, and renamed Ouranos, entering service on the Corfu, Greece - Brindisi, Italy route. In January 2001, Ouranos was sold to F Lines Inc, Majuro, Marshall Islands. She was renamed F Diamond on 16 February 2001, but her registry remained with Malta.

A late nickname for the ship was "Black Diamond", after it was painted black. The ship served as a party ship in Genoa after it was detained there for eight days on 9 October 2008, after inspection found 21 deficiencies; the party ship use caused local controversy. In June 2010, F Diamond was sold by auction to Cemsan Gemi Sokum, Aliağa, Turkey, which planned to use her as a floating hotel. She was sold in September 2010 to Turkish shipbreakers and was renamed Diamond. She arrived at the shipbreakers on 11 September.
