= Tor Line =

Shipping company

- Industry: Shipping
- Founded: 1966
- Defunct: 2010
- Fate: Integrated into DFDS Seaways
- Headquarters: Copenhagen, Denmark (As DFDS Tor Line); Gothenburg, Sweden (As Tor Line)
- Area served: North Sea; Baltic Sea
- Services: Freight transportation
- Parent: DFDS A/S
- Website: www.dfds.com

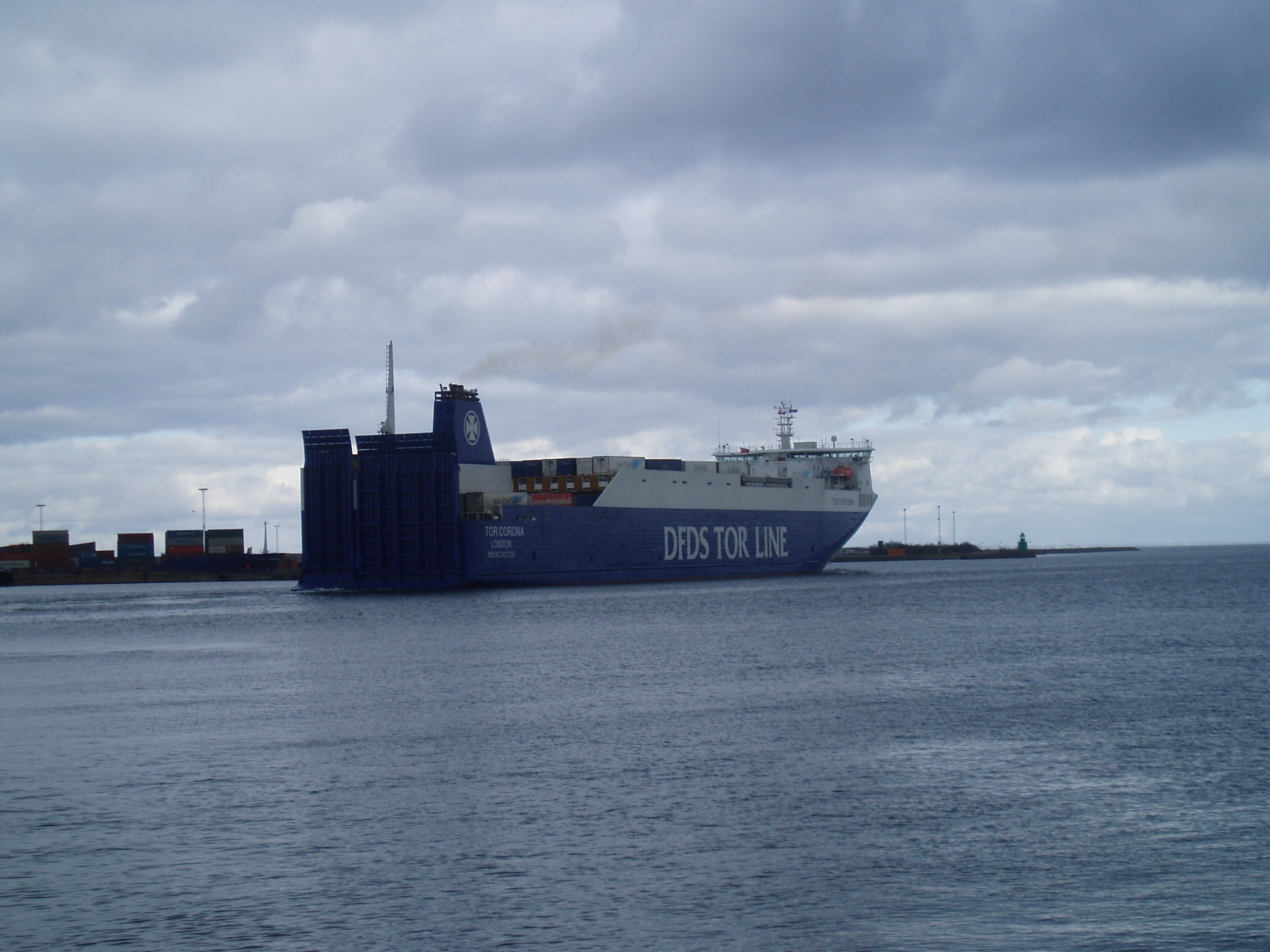
MS Tor Corona departing Copenhagen, March 2008.

The Tor Line was a freight shipping company. Together with its subsidiaries, the Tor Line operated a fleet of approximately 65 ro-ro, ro-pax and lo-lo ships, primarily on the North and Baltic Seas. It was ultimately purchased by Denmark-based DFDS, which renamed it DFDS Tor Line, and it operated as a freight-carrying division of DFDS along with DFDS Lisco, DFDS Lys Line and DFDS Container Line before retiring the brand.

Tor Line was founded as a joint venture between the Swedish Trans Oil Shipping and Rex Shipping to operate car-passenger ferries between Sweden, England and the Netherlands. The company name was an abbreviation of the founding companies' names, Trans Oil and Rex Line. Tor Line begun passenger operations in 1966 and freight operations in 1969. In 1980 Tor Line formed a brief joint venture for passenger services, Sessan Tor Line, with Sessan Line. A similar joint venture was formed for freight services with Swedish Lloyd. Both proved short-lived: Stena Line acquired Sessan Line in 1981, and during the same year Tor Line passenger services were sold to DFDS. A year later DFDS also acquired Tor Line's freight services. Initially both divisions were marketed as DFDS Tor Line, but the passenger ferries were later moved under the DFDS brand.

== History ==
=== Passenger operations 1966–1981 ===
Two Swedish shipping companies, Trans Oil Shipping and Rex Shipping, decided to form a new company for providing car/passenger ferry services between Sweden, England and the Netherlands. The new Tor Line (an abbreviation of Trans Oil and Rex) ordered the construction of two state-of-the-art ferries from Lübecker Flender-Werke in West Germany. These entered service on the Gothenburg—Immingham—Amsterdam route in 1966 and 1967 as MS Tor Anglia and MS Tor Hollandia, respectively. Meanwhile, Bratt-Götha and the Dutch KNSM (Koninklijke Nederlandsche Stoomboot-Maatschappij) joined as shareholders (25% each). Tor Line's main rivals on the Sweden—England route were England-Sweden Line (ESL), a joint service operated by Ellerman's Wilson Line, Swedish Lloyd and Rederi AB Svea. The ESL partner companies had also brought new ships on the route in 1966, but these were slower than the Tor ships, had less modern furnishings and lacked full-height cardecks.

In 1975 Tor Line took delivery of the new, larger and faster MS Tor Britannia for the Sweden—England—Netherlands service, followed in 1976 by MS Tor Scandinavia, a second ship of the same design. With the delivery of the new ships the Tor Anglia and Tor Hollandia were sold. Also in 1976 the English terminal of Tor Line's services was moved to Felixstowe. The new ships were arguably the finest ferries of the time, and served as the final blow to the ESL service. Ellerman's Wilson Line and Rederi AB Svea had already dropped out of the joint service previously, and in 1977 Swedish Lloyd also ceased their passenger operations. Despite their dominant position in the Sweden-England service Tor Line's financial position was precarious. There was not enough passenger demand for two large ships on the service during the winter months; due to this the Tor Scandinavia was chartered out as an expedition ship during the winter seasons from 1979 onwards.

To improve their financial position Tor line sought out partnerships with other shipping companies. In 1979 MS Espresso Olbia (the former Tor Anglia) was chartered for a planned joint Gothenburg—Kristiansand—Newcastle with Fred. Olsen, but Fred. Olsen pulled out before the service could commence. Instead the Espresso Olbia was laid up in Gothenburg. In early 1980 a more successful joint service was formed with Sessan Line, when Sessan Tor Line was established. Logos of the new joint service were painted on Tor Line's ships. Sessan Tor Line proved short-lived as Sessan's main competitors Stena Line purchased Sessan in early 1981. Subsequently, Tor Line entered negotiations to sell either the Tor Britannia or Tor Scandinavia to DFDS. Instead of buying just one ship DFDS purchased the entire Tor Line passenger division in late 1981. Initially the Tor ships were marketed as DFDS Tor Line, but were subsequently absorbed into DFDS' passenger division DFDS Seaways. Despite this they kept their original Tor-prefixed names until 1990–1991.

=== Freight operations 1969 onwards ===
Tor Line first initiated freight services in 1969 with MS Tor Mercia, and the company acquired a large fleet of freight-carrying vessels during the subsequent years. In 1980, around the same time as the establishment of joint passenger services with Sessan Line, Tor Line established a joint freight service with their former competitors Swedish Lloyd, marketed as Tor Lloyd. During the Falklands War at least one of the Tor Lloyd ships, MS Tor Caledonia, was chartered to the United Kingdom Ministry of Defence for service as a supply vessel.

Like the joint Sessan Tor service, the joint Tor Lloyd service proved short-lived, and in 1982 DFDS acquired Tor Line's freight operations. Following the acquisition the former Tor Line ships were rebranded DFDS Tor Line, and subsequently the Tor division developed into DFDS' main freight-carrying subsidiary.

=== Organisation changes 2010 onwards ===
In 2010 DFDS acquired Norfolkline from Maersk. Following restructuring, the operations of DFDS Tor Line, DFDS Lisco and Norfolkline were integrated into DFDS Seaways. The merger led to changes and additions to freight destinations and an expansion in freight volumes. It is at this point that the historic Tor Line ceased to exist as a brand and entity, though its contributions to the legacy of North Sea and Baltic Sea maritime shipping remains.

== Fleet ==
Ship	Built	Entered service	Gross tonnage	Flag	Notes
MS Tor Belgia	1978	1992	21,491 GT	Sweden	Under charter from Eidsiva Rederi.
MS Tor Dania	1978	1992	21,850 GT	Norway	Under charter from Doyen Shipping.
MS Tor Humbria	1978	1999	20,165 GT	Norway	Under charter from CS & Partners.
MS Tor Neringa	1975	1999	12,494 GT	Lithuania	Under charter from DFDS Lisco.
MS Tor Selandia	1999	1999	24,196 GT	Sweden	
MS Tor Suecia	1999	1999	24,196 GT	Sweden	
MS Tor Baltica	1977	2000	14,374 GT	Belize	Under charter from Balticum Shipping.
MS Tor Britannia	2000	2000	24,196 GT	Denmark	
MS Tor Magnolia	2003	2003	32,289 GT	Denmark	
MS Tor Begonia	2004	2004	32,289 GT	Sweden	
MS Tor Petunia	2004	2004	32,289 GT	Denmark	
MS Tor Primula	2004	2004	32,289 GT	Denmark	
MS Tor Bellona	1980	2005	22,748 GT	United Kingdom	Under charter from Eidsiva Rederi.
MS Tor Freesia	2005	2005	32,289 GT	Sweden	
MS Mermaid II	1972	2006	13,730 GT	Latvia	Under charter from Skandia Liv.
MS Tor Ficaria	2006	2006	32,289 GT	Denmark	
MS Ark Forwarder	1998	2007	21,004 GT	United Kingdom	Under charter from Stena Line.
MS Tor Corona	2007	2007	25,600 GT	United Kingdom	Under charter from Macoma Shipping.
MS Aegean Sky	1974	2007	13,436 GT	Saint Vincent and the Grenadines	Under charter from Crystalline Oceanway.
MS Tor Finlandia	2000	2009	11,530 GT	Lithuania	

=== Former ships ===
==== Passenger ferries ====
Ship	Built	In service	Tonnage	Flag
MS Tor Anglia	1966	1966–1976	7,042 GRT	Sweden
MS Tor Hollandia	1967	1967–1975	7,432 GRT	Sweden
MS Tor Britannia	1975	1975–1981	14,905 GRT	Sweden
MS Tor Scandinavia	1976	1976–1981	15,673 GRT	Sweden

==== Freighters ====
Ship	Built	In service	Chartered/owned	Tonnage	Flag
MS Loon-Plage	1991	1999	Chartered	4,962 GT	Cyprus
