= John Ditlev-Simonsen =

Norwegian sailor (1898–2001)

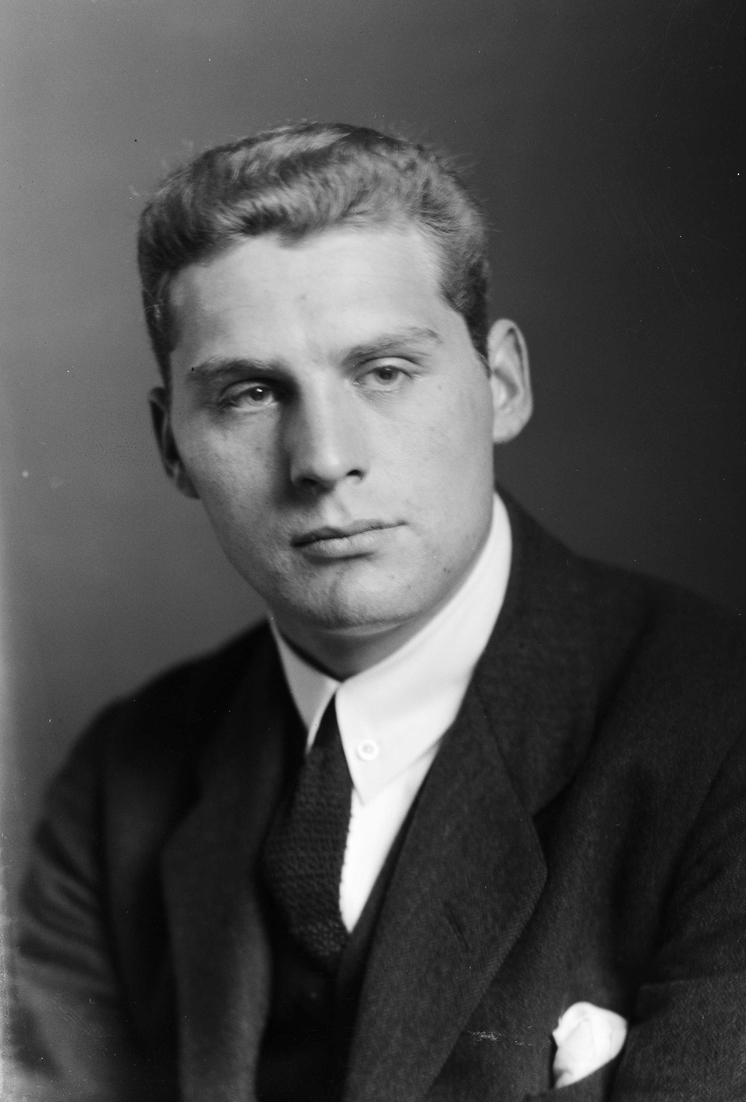
- Ditlev-Simonsen, 1920

Personal information
- Full name: John Peder Ditlev-Simonsen
- Born: 18 October 1898 Dybvaag Municipality, Norway
- Died: 10 January 2001 (aged 102) Oslo, Norway
Medal record
Sailing
Representing Norway
Olympic Games
Silver medal – second place	1936 Berlin	8 metre class

John Peder Ditlev-Simonsen (18 October 1898 – 10 January 2001) was a Norwegian sailor who competed in the 1936 Summer Olympics. In 1936 he won the silver medal as crew member of the Norwegian boat Silja in the 8 metre class event.

During the Second World War Ditlev-Simonsen was amongst a number of prominent Norwegians arrested as hostages by the Germans during their occupation of Norway. Following his arrest on 26 April 1943 he was transferred to Grini concentration camp two days later and given prisoner number 7449, being released on 5 May 1945. His brother Olaf was also arrested and held as a hostage by the Germans.
