= D-class ferry =

Rollon rolloff ferry

D class
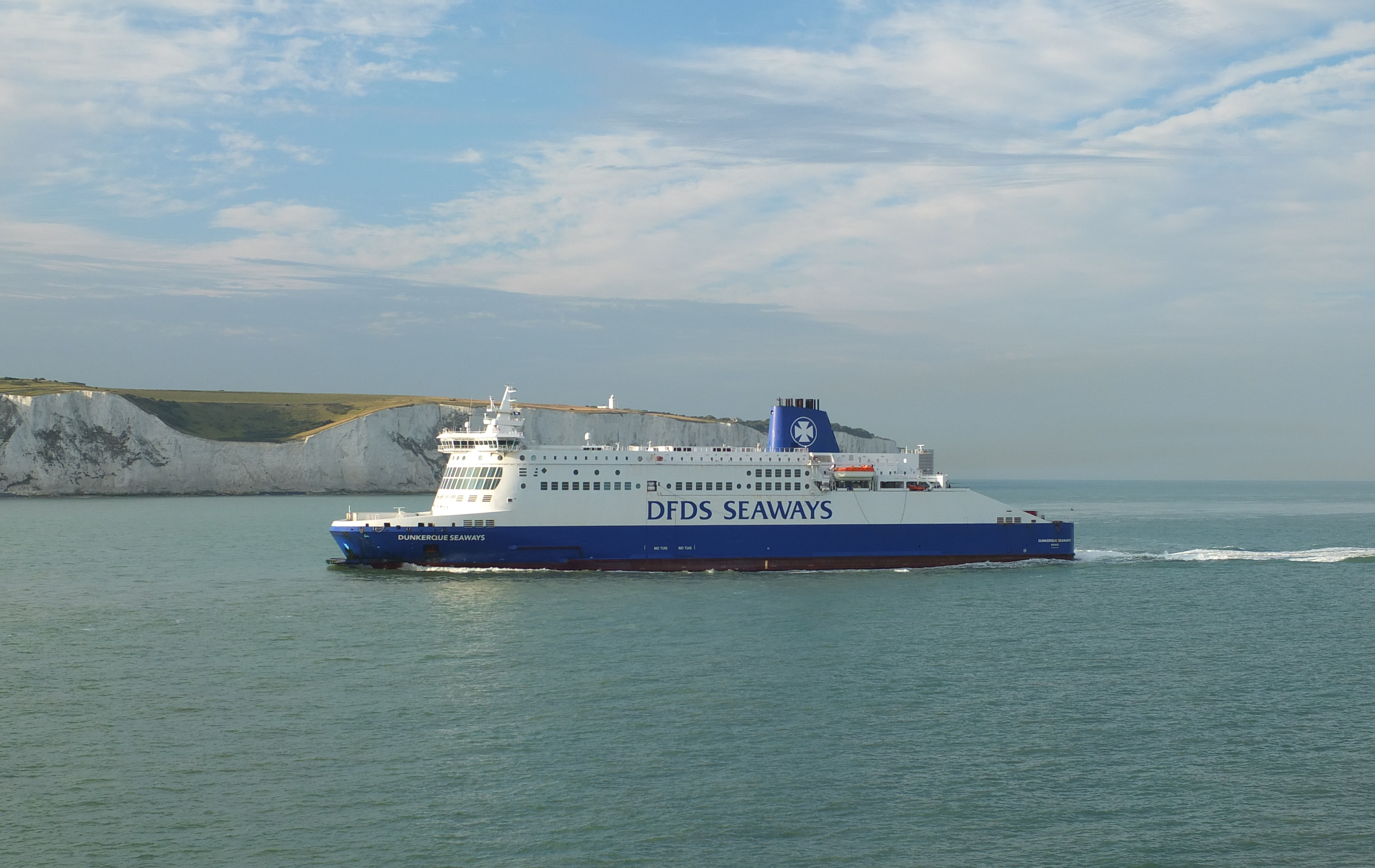
- Dunkerque Seaways sailing into Dover Harbour

Class overview
- Builders: Samsung Heavy Industries, Geoje, South Korea
- Operators: Norfolkline 2005–2010; DFDS Seaways 2010–present
- Built: 2003–2006
- In service: 2005–present
- Planned: 3
- Completed: 3

General characteristics
- Tonnage: 35,293 GT
- Length: 186.65 m (612 ft 4 in)
- Beam: 28.40 m (93 ft 2 in)
- Draught: 6.75 m (22 ft 2 in)
- Decks: 9
- Propulsion: 4 × MAN B&W 8L48/60B diesel engine
- Speed: 25 knots (46 km/h; 29 mph) (service); 28 knots (52 km/h; 32 mph) (max)
- Capacity: 780-1000 passengers; 2990 lane metres
- Crew: 70

The D-class ferries are a trio of RoRo ferries built by Samsung Heavy Industries between 2003 and 2006 and operated by DFDS Seaways. They were originally operated by Norfolkline, and sail between Dover, United Kingdom and Dunkerque, France.

== Background ==
The trio was originally conceived by Maersk subsidiary Norfolkline for their service between Dover and Dunkerque. Around 2000, Norfolkline revived the former Dover-Dunkerque train ferry service that was shut down in 1995 as a ferry for roadgoing freight, targeted at HGVs. Initially, the company started out sailing one chartered ship - the Midnight Merchant from Norse Merchant Ferries. However, the route became an unexpected hit, and within five years Norfolkline chartered three more ships from Norse Merchant. At the same time, Norfolkline was looking to expand their Dover-Dunkerque offering away from HGVs and into the tourist market, and with the extra demand affirming the viability of the newbuilds, the project went ahead.

== Overview ==
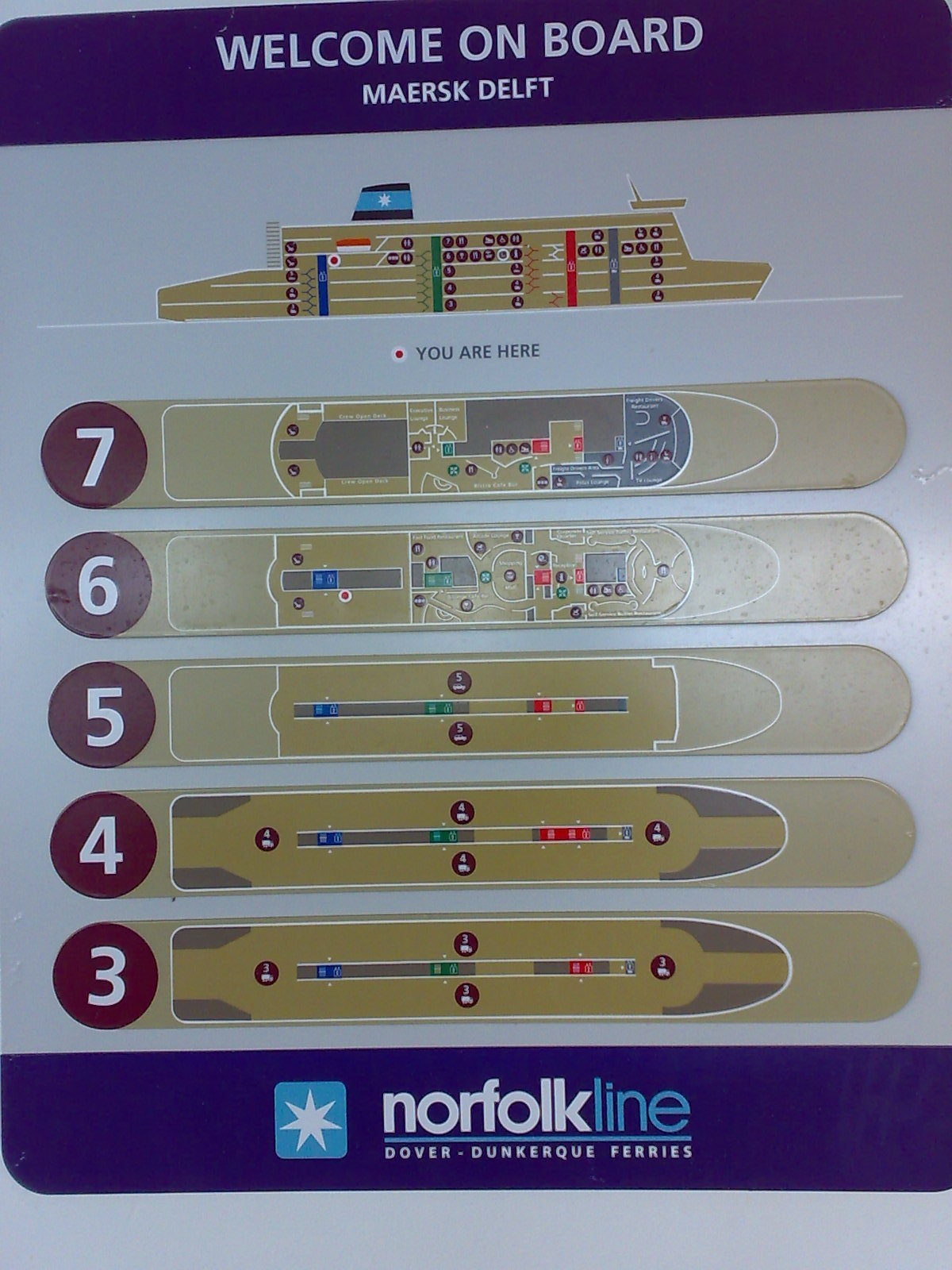
Deck plan onboard Maersk Delft

The D-class ferries were built by Samsung Heavy Industries and consist of three ships in the class - Dunkerque Seaways, Delft Seaways and Dover Seaways They measure 186 m (610 ft 3 in) long by 28 m (91 ft 10 in) wide with a 6.75 m (22 ft 2 in) draught, and are powered by four diesel engines connected to two propellers via gearboxes. Their certified service speed is 25 knots (46 km/h; 29 mph), but the Delft Seaways was recorded on her delivery voyage sailing at 28 knots (52 km/h; 32 mph) when fleeing from attacking pirates off Somalia on her delivery voyage.

=== External design ===
Externally, the class of these ships is easily distinguishable by the huge two-deck panoramic windows at the bow superstructure below the bridge, a second set of panoramic windows on the starboard side of the ship, and a funnel design unique to ships designed for Maersk and its subsidiaries. As is common for ferries sailing into and out of Dover, the class is installed with a so-called "cow-catcher" at the bow, and with sliding stern doors. This is because ferries operating into and out of Dover use land-based shore-to-ship ramps instead of the more common ship-to-shore ramps.

=== Internal design ===
Internally the ships are made up of nine decks - decks 1 and 2 are reserved for machinery, while decks 3, 4 and 5 are reserved for vehicular traffic. Decks 6 and 7 are the passenger decks, whilst decks 8 and 9 are used for crew purposes. In the passenger areas (decks 6 and 7), the space below the panoramic windows is taken by two restaurants - one for HGV drivers on the upper deck and a general restaurant on the lower deck, alongside a children's play area next to the general restaurant. Further back, space near the starboard panoramic windows is taken up by a café, with a premium lounge on the deck above it. Behind the café and the premium lounge on both decks 7 and 8 are open areas for passengers.

== History ==
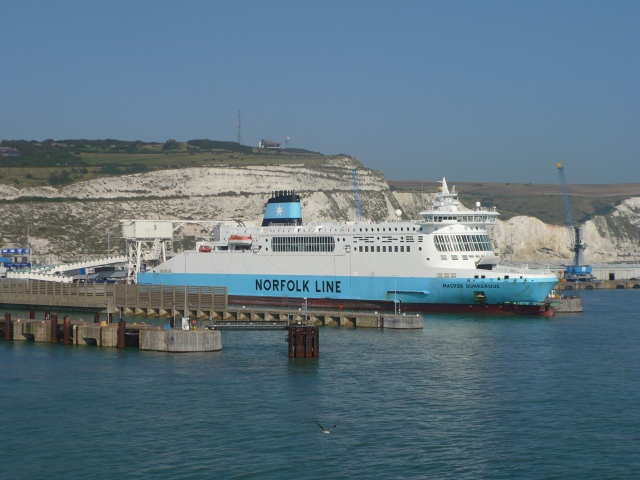
Dunkerque Seaways in 2007 as seen in her original guise as Maersk Dunkerque

The first ship to be built - the Maersk Dunkerque - was delivered in September 2005, beginning service in October that same year. The two other sister ships - Maersk Delft and Maersk Dover entered service in February and July 2006 respectively. Shortly after entering service, the Maersk Dunkerque developed some engine troubles throughout 2006, frequently cancelling sailings. The last one of these troubles happened in September of that year.

On 17 October 2006, the Maersk Dover was involved in a near miss between the oil tanker Apollonia and another Maersk-owned vessel, the container ship Maersk Vancouver. No injuries occurred, and no damage occurred to any of the ships involved.

In 2010 Norfolkline was acquired by DFDS A/S, which merged their operations with their ferry subsidiary DFDS Seaways. Throughout 2010, the ships remained in their Norfolkline paint schemes, but their funnels were repainted in DFDS' colours. It was not until 2011 that they were fully repainted in DFDS' house colours.

On 9 November 2014, the Dover Seaways was involved in an incident at Dover, where she crashed into the harbour seawall. The damage sustained by the ship meant that she was out of service for roughly a week and a half for maintenance, before returning on 21 November.

In late 2015, DFDS rebranded, with the company adopting a new livery for their fleet, with a darker shade of blue and white lettering on the dark hull. Throughout January 2016 the trio were repainted in the new DFDS paint scheme.

== Ships in the class ==
- Dunkerque Seaways - previously Maersk Dunkerque
- Delft Seaways - previously Maersk Delft
- Dover Seaways - previously Maersk Dover
