= Dunkerque (disambiguation) =

Dunkerque is a town and port in northern France.

Dunkerque may also refer to:

- USL Dunkerque, a French football club
- Dunkerque-class battleship
- French battleship Dunkerque
- MS Dunkerque Seaways, a cross channel RO-RO Ferry
