= Delft Seaways =

Roll-on/roll-off ferry

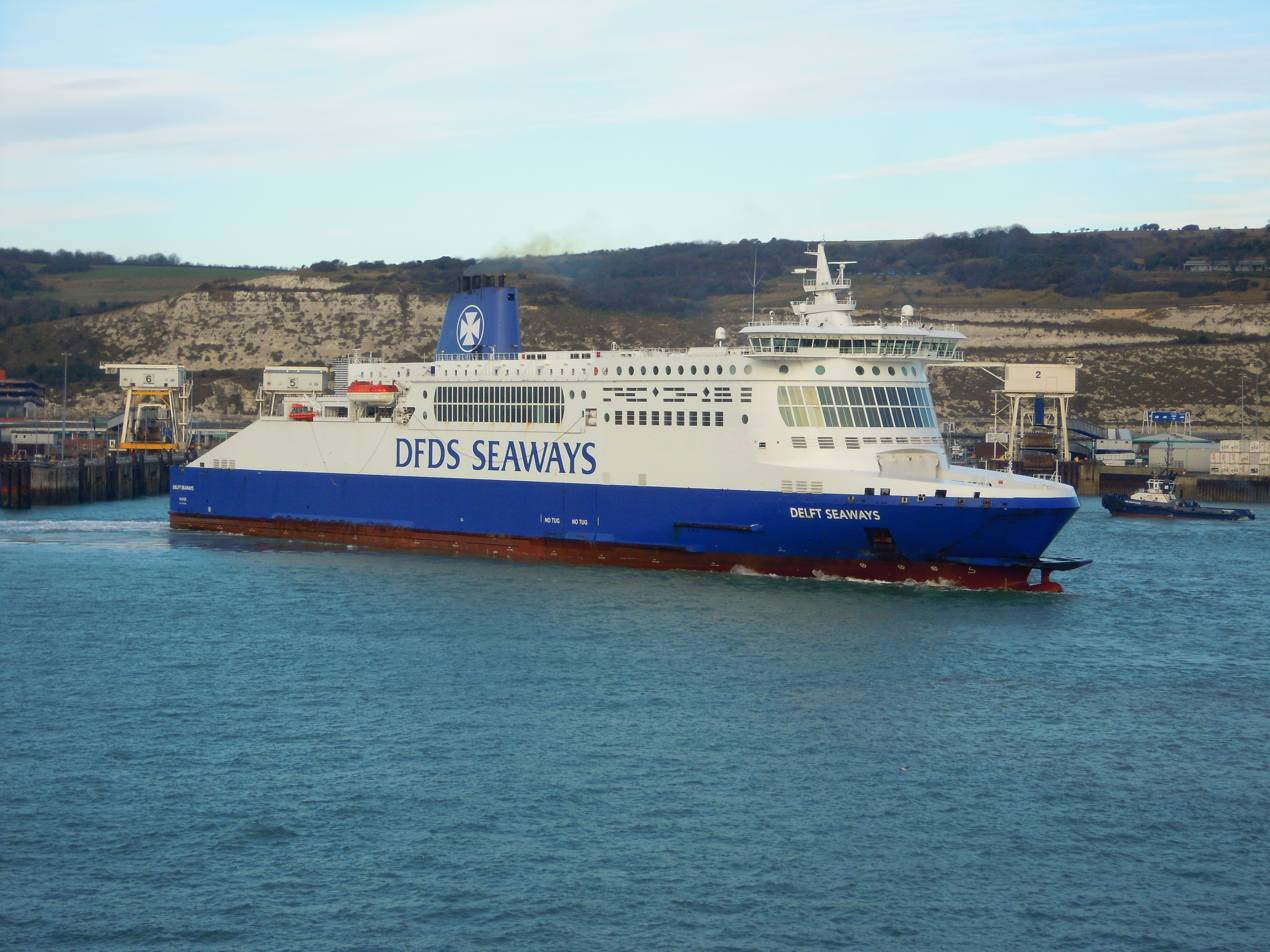
- Delft Seaways

History
- Name: 2006-2010: Maersk Delft; 2010 onwards: Delft Seaways
- Owner: DFDS Seaways
- Operator: 2006-2010: Norfolkline; 2010 onwards: DFDS Seaways
- Port of registry: Dover, United Kingdom
- Builder: Samsung Heavy Industries, South Korea
- Yard number: 1524
- Laid down: 12 March 2003
- Launched: 7 May 2005
- Completed: 2005
- Maiden voyage: 27 February 2006
- Identification: Callsign: MJYC9; IMO number: 9293088; MMSI number: 235009590
- Status: in service

General characteristics
- Class & type: D-class RoRo car ferry
- Tonnage: 35,293 GT
- Length: 186.65 m (612.4 ft)
- Beam: 28.40 m (93.2 ft)
- Draught: 6.75 m (22.1 ft)
- Decks: 9
- Propulsion: 4 x MAN B&W 8L48/60B diesel
- Speed: 25 kn (46.3 km/h) (service); 28 kn (51.9 km/h) (max)

Delft Seaways is a ro-pax ferry owned and operated by DFDS Seaways. She is one of three sister ships designed for the cross-Channel route from Dover to Dunkerque, capable of making the crossing in 1 hour and 45 minutes. Delft Seaways is a Scandinavian designed ship built at the Samsung shipyards in South Korea in 2005. She sails under the flag of the United Kingdom and her port of registry is Dover.

== History ==
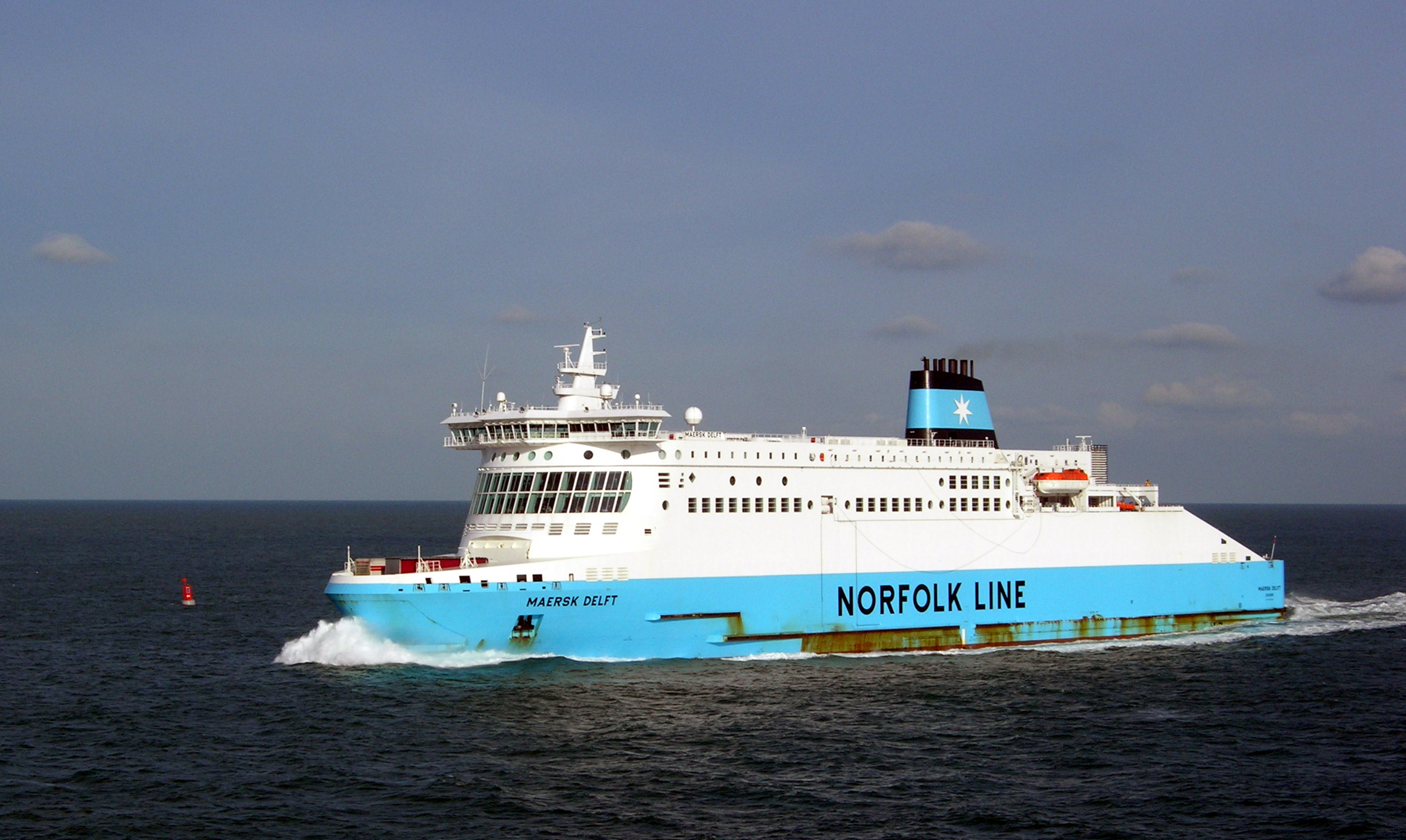
Maersk Delft

The ship was ordered in 2003 as the second of the three Maersk D-Class car ferries. delivered in 2006 and made her maiden voyage on 27 February 2006, replacing the Northern Merchant which previously operated the route. She had an encounter with armed speedboats in the Gulf of Aden during the delivery voyage from Korea.

Maersk Delft suffered a loss of power whilst returning to Dover following a refit at Scheldeport Dockyard, Vlissingen on 29 January 2007. The fault was blamed on a computer error, but the vessel had to be towed into Dover harbour from outside the eastern entrance where she had anchored.

In July 2010 Norfolkline was acquired by DFDS. The Norfolkline ships and routes were re-branded as DFDS Seaways. In 2016 the ships went into drydock at Damen shipyard in Dunkirk. They were rebranded into the new DFDS livery which dropped the Seaways branding from the side of the vessel. Delft Seaways kept the Seaways name, the same as with the other D-Class vessels.

== Vessel overview ==
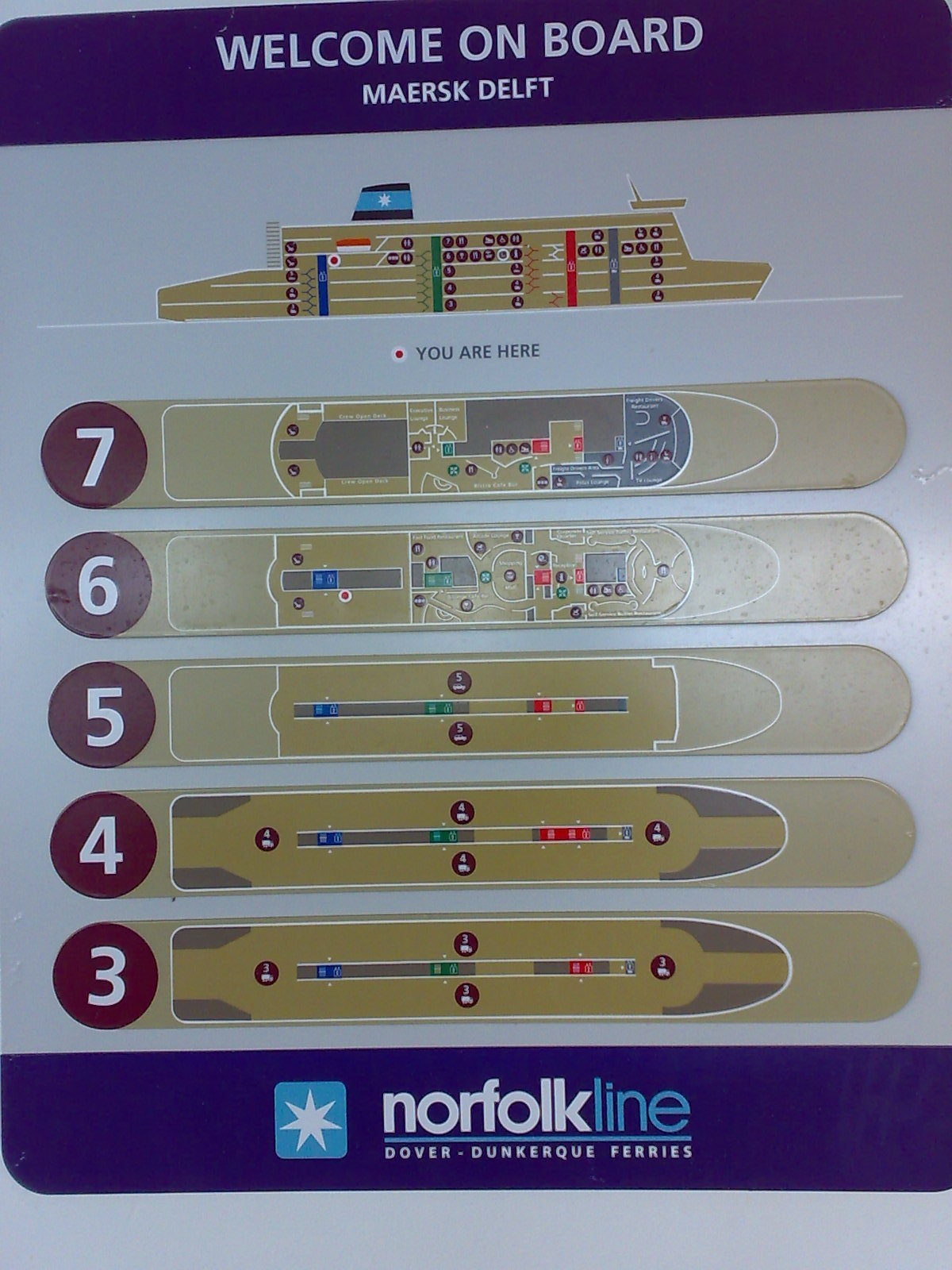
Deck plan onboard Maersk Delft

The Delft Seaways, or former Maersk Delft, is a member of the triplet D-class of Ro-Pax vessels, being designed to replace the older so-called Racehorse quartet of Ro/Ro ferries specialised for lorry freight. The D-class of vessels has been named so, as all the triplets have their names beginning with the letter D, with Dover Seaways, Dunkerque Seaways and Delft Seaways.

All vessels are twin-screw Ro-Pax vessels, with space for 930 passengers and 2990 lane metres of vehicle capacity, divided between three vehicle decks, with decks 3 and 4 reserved for lorries and other freight. Their service speed is 25 knots, although they can make 28 knots in an emergency, and are powered by four MAN diesel engines coupled to two propellers. They also have four 1800kW thrusters, three on the bow and one on the stern. The vessels of this class are easily distinguishable due to their signature windows at the bow of the superstructure, which provide for a panoramic view of the English Channel for passengers.

Under Norfolkline, the vessel also had some 132 artworks made by Anne Visbøll, although it is unknown whether the artworks remain on the vessel under DFDS ownership.

== Sister ships ==
Delft Seaways has two sister ships operating on the same service: Dunkerque Seaways and Dover Seaways.
