= Vallerey =

Vallerey is a French surname that may refer to

- Georges Vallerey (1902–1956), French Olympic swimmer
- Georges Vallerey, Jr. (1927–1954), French Olympic swimmer, son of the above
- Gisèle Vallerey (1930–2010), French Olympic swimmer, daughter of Georges
- Tancrède Vallerey (1892–1974), French writer
