= Norfolkline =

Ferry company owned by Maersk Line

- Company type: Private
- Industry: Transport
- Founded: 1961
- Defunct: 2010
- Fate: Integrated into DFDS Seaways
- Headquarters: Scheveningen, The Netherlands, Netherlands
- Area served: Irish Sea; English Channel; North Sea
- Key people: Thomas Woldbye MD & CEO
- Services: Passenger transportation Freight transportation
- Revenue: 1 billion + EUR (2007)
- Number of employees: 2,200 (2008)

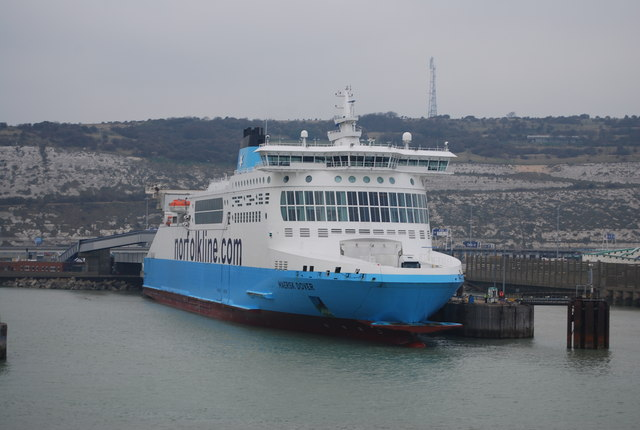
MS Maersk Dover

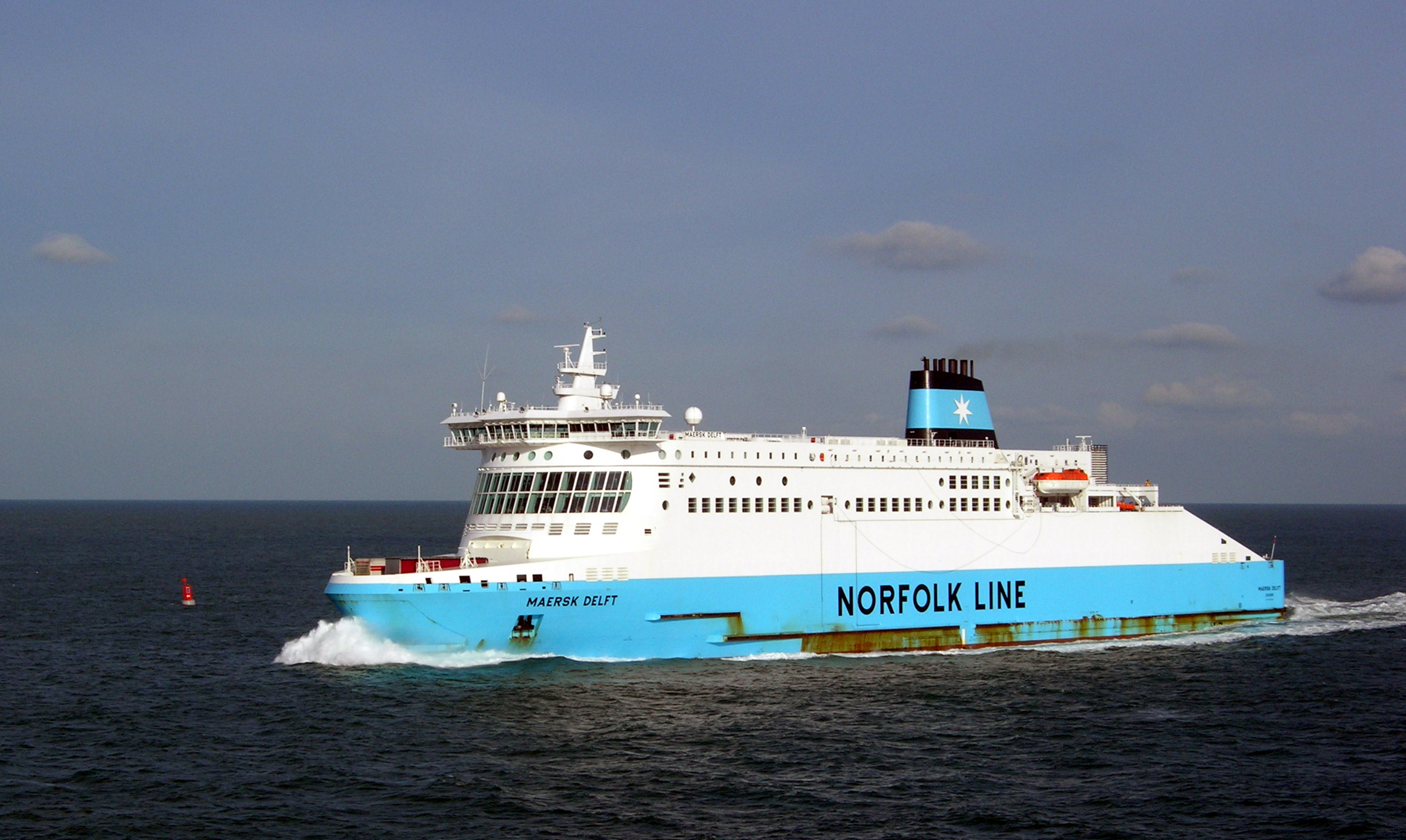
Norfolkline ro-pax ferry M/S Maersk Delft, built 2006.

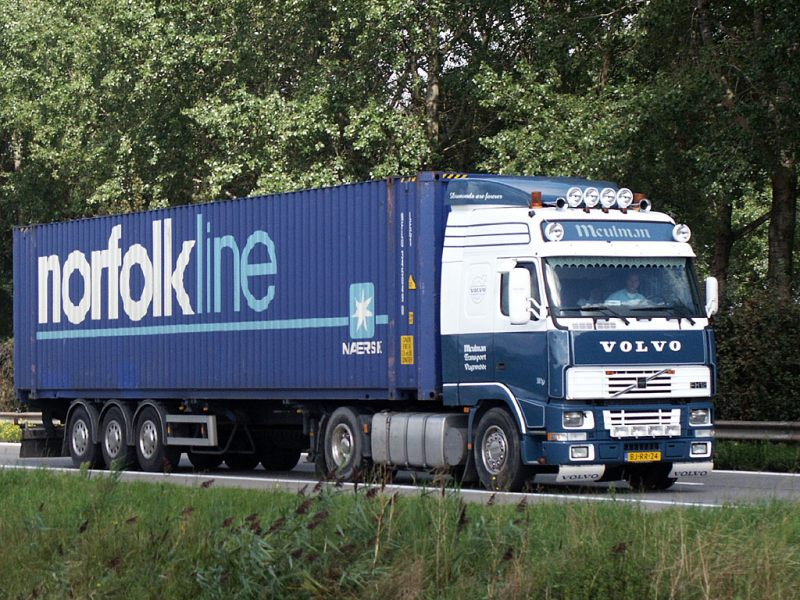
Norfolkline container being hauled by a sub-contractor's lorry.

Norfolkline was a European ferry operator and logistics company owned by Maersk. It provided freight ferry services on the English Channel, Irish Sea, and the North Sea; and passenger ferry services on the English Channel and Irish Sea; and logistics services across Europe. Norfolkline employed more than 2,200 employees in 13 countries across Europe, operating out of 35 different locations.

Norfolkline operated 18 vessels and over 550 refrigerated trailers (including 200 with dual compartment units), 1,750 dry-cargo trailers, and 1,150 swap-body trailers for intermodal freight transport. In 2006 more than 1.5 million passengers used Norfolkline's ferry services across the English Channel between Dover and Dunkirk and on the Irish Sea (between Liverpool and Belfast & Liverpool and Dublin) and over 1.2 million freight movements were completed.

In July 2010, DFDS acquired Norfolkline; The Norfolkline routes and vessels were integrated into DFDS Seaways.

== History ==
Activities started in 1961 when Dutch entrepreneur Mr. L. Remeeus founded Norfolk Lijn N.V. He operated two coasters on a regular cargo service between Great Yarmouth and Scheveningen. The first appearance of the company in the ferry business was made possible when the roll-on/roll-off vessel Duke of Holland was acquired in 1969. Mr. Remeeus sold Norfolk Lijn N.V. to Unilever in 1973 and the company was renamed Norfolk Line in 1974.

The Company operated out of Great Yarmouth with "Duke of Holland and Duke of Norfolk", operations from Great Yarmouth commenced in 1969 and were finished by 1992, when nearby Felixstowe poached the business with Norfolkline in an aim to enhance the size of its fleet, which at the time Felixstowe could accommodate but Great Yarmouth couldn't.

The operations at Great Yarmouth were located at Atlas Terminal in the area of town known as South Denes. Norfolkline's UK head office was located at Atlas House (now demolished) whilst the operator had the entire Atlas Terminal quayside, a holding yard on the other side of the road as well as other facilities around the town. It is widely rumoured, that the town's outer harbour, which was first proposed around the 1960s/1970s was the main reason for the operator pulling the plug.

Maersk wanted to hold an ownership in the new harbour and pay partly towards it, whilst also funding improvements to major road networks to the town including the A47 and A12 as well as partly funding a new river crossing. When the town and port authority rejected this proposal as well as the issue of capacity sizing which was soon outgrowing the town's river harbour and without the outer harbour it would have been falling behind, later Norfolkline moved to Felixstowe in 1992.

The Maersk Company Ltd, subsidiary of A.P. Møller acquired Norfolk Line in 1985.

The nineties started with the merger of Norfolk Line with rail transport specialist Skandi in 1995 introducing rail freight services to the company, followed by 4 new vessels that were added to the Norfolk Line fleet (1996) and the opening of a container route between Rotterdam (Holland) to Waterford (Ireland) in 1997. The year after that the company was renamed Norfolkline and the refrigerated transport business was launched in Belfast. A second refrigerated transport location was launched in 1999 in Larkhall.

In the new millennium, the ferry division expanded with the start of a ferry route from Dover (UK) to Dunkirk (France) in 2000. Five years later Norfolkline acquired Norse Merchant Ferries, a roll-on/roll-off ferry operator on Irish Sea routes. In 2006 a new roll-on/roll-off terminal in Vlaardingen was opened, launching a new route between Vlaardingen and Felixstowe/North Killingholme Haven.

== Norfolkline business ==
Norfolkline's business was split in two divisions, a Logistics division and a Ferry division.

=== Logistics division ===
The logistics division was focused on tailor made solutions through different industries. Norfolkline operated logistics services providing refrigerated transportation of goods by road, rail, and sea from locations across Europe with routes from/to Belgium, Denmark, the United Kingdom, Finland, France, Germany, Ireland, Italy, Norway, Sweden, Switzerland, and the Netherlands.

=== Ferry division ===
Norfolkline operated passenger and freight ferry services on the English Channel, the Irish Sea and the North Sea. Norfolkline's North Sea services carried freight only, whereas all other routes carried both lorry freight and private vehicles. Norfolkline also carried foot passengers on some of their North Sea services. Norfolkline's ferry routes were as follows:

- Birkenhead—Dublin
- Dover—Dunkirk
- Dublin—Heysham (Freight only)
- Esbjerg—Harwich (Freight only)
- Esbjerg—Immingham (Freight only)
- Felixstowe—Vlaardingen (Freight only)
- Gothenburg—Immingham (Freight only)
- Immingham—Vlaardingen (Freight only)
- Rosyth—Zeebrugge

== Social and environmental responsibility ==
Staff of Norfolkline Larkhall raised money for Cash for Kids, a Scottish charity. The company sponsored the Liverpool Irish Festival 2008. Norfolkline Irish Sea has provided financial support for Action Renewables.

Norfolkline reduced their carbon footprint by investing in environmental friendly resources, such as their investment of refrigerated trailers which are 92% recyclable.

== Awards and recognitions ==
- 2008 - “Best Ferry Company” by readers of Guardian.
- 2007 - “Highly Recommended” in “Best Ferry Company” category of the 2007 Telegraph Travel Awards.
- 2006 - winner NBCC Trophy (Netherlands British Chamber of Commerce), Anglo-Dutch award for enterprise.
- 2004 - voted “Best European Crossing Operator” by readers of The Daily Telegraph and Sunday Telegraph.
- 2004 - voted “Leading Cross Channel Operator” by readers of The Guardian and The Observer.

== List of Norfolkline vessels ==
- Maersk Dunkerque
- Maersk Delft
- Maersk Dover
- Maersk Flanders
- Maersk Anglia
- Maersk Importer
- Maersk Essex
- Maersk Kent
- Maersk Exporter
- Maas Viking
- Lagan Viking
- Mersey Viking
- Dublin Viking
- Liverpool Viking
- Saga Moon
- East Express
- Maersk Vlaardingen
- Maersk Voyager
- RR Shield
- Merchant Brilliant
- Scottish Viking
