= Flanders bank =

The Flanders Banks is an array of nine sandbanks which extend off the coast of Dunkirk, France, in the southern North Sea.

== Geography ==
A short distance from Dunkirk lie the Flanders Banks, generally rising to a depth of less than 5 metres (16 1/2 feet) and separated by furrows 10 to 20 metres (33 to 66 feet) deep. These sandbanks, also called sublittoral sandy sedimentary groups, are oriented from east-northeast to west-southwest and arranged parallel to the coast of France. They enclose the harbour at Dunkirk, forcing ships to follow marked passages — the West Pass and the Zuydcoote Pass — to enter or leave the port. It is to the north of the Zuydcoote Pass that the banks can be seen emerging at low tide.

The continental base is relatively shallow in this area and the banks were formed by tidal currents. Their formation is linked to the flow gain, that is to say that the mass of materials brought by the flow is greater than that removed by the ebb. These banks can take on the appearance of real underwater dunes formed from the accumulation of shell sand, called hydraulic dunes, rising around 20 metres (66 feet) above the seabed.

== Environment ==
The Flanders Banks are integrated into the perimeter of the Natura 2000 Bancs de Flandres site which covers a vast area of 1,132 km^{2} (437 sq mi) in the North Sea off the coast of France. The sandbanks are relatively poor in terms of biological diversity, but they are home to species characteristic of this type of formation such as the sand dollar. The area is notable for the presence of marine mammals, with a resident population of seals and episodic populations of grey seals and porpoises.
