= Dunkerque Seaways =

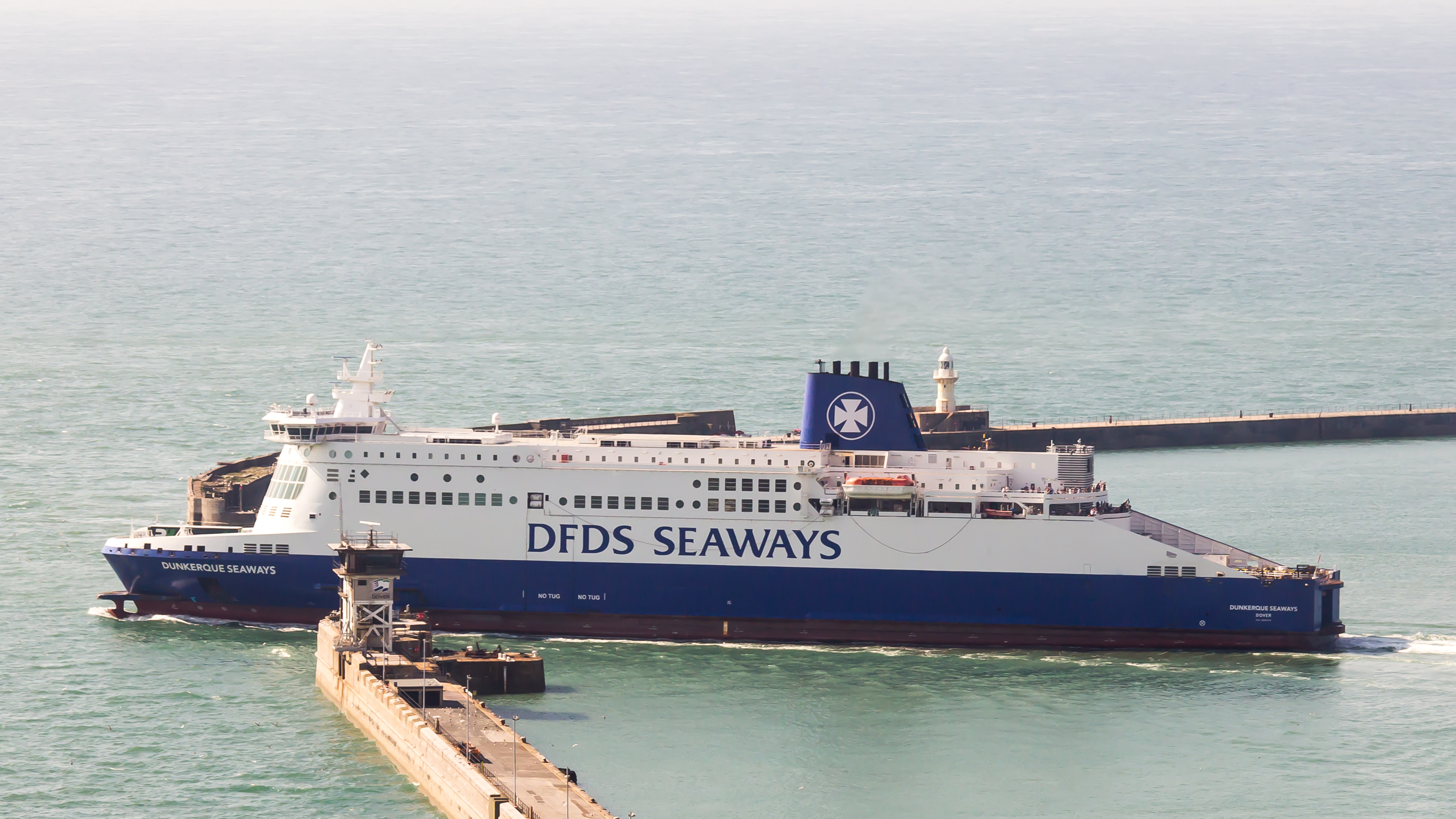
- Dunkerque Seaways in Dover

History
- Name: 2005-2010: Maersk Dunkerque; 2010 onwards: Dunkerque Seaways
- Owner: 2005-2010: Norfolkline; 2010 onwards: DFDS A/S
- Operator: 2005-2010: Norfolkline; 2010 onwards: DFDS Seaways
- Port of registry: Dover, United Kingdom
- Route: Dover - Dunkirk
- Ordered: 2003
- Builder: Samsung Heavy Industries, South Korea
- Yard number: 1523
- Launched: 29 December 2004
- Acquired: 27 September 2005
- Maiden voyage: 9 November 2005
- Identification: Call sign MJTL2; IMO number: 9293076; MMSI number: 235028825
- Status: In service

General characteristics
- Class & type: Norfolkline 'D' class ro-pax ferry
- Tonnage: 35,923 GT; 6,787 t DWT
- Length: 186.65 m (612.37 ft)
- Beam: 28.00 m (91.86 ft)
- Depth: 6.80 m (22.31 ft)
- Decks: 9
- Installed power: 4 × MAN 8L48/ 60B diesels; combined 38400 kW
- Speed: 25 knots
- Capacity: 934 passengers; 200 cars; 120 trucks; 1800 lanemeters
- Crew: 70

Dunkerque Seaways (previously Maersk Dunkerque) is a ro-pax ferry operated by DFDS Seaways on its English Channel route between Dover, England and Dunkirk, France. She was delivered to Norfolkline in 2005 as Maersk Dunkerque.

== Career ==
Norfolkline, a subsidiary of the Danish shipping company Maersk, placed an order with Samsung Heavy Industries for three ro-pax ferries to replace older ships on the cross-channel route between Dover and Dunkirk. Maersk Dunkerque was the first of her class. She was built at Samsung Heavy Industries's yard in Geoje, South Korea. She was delivered in September 2005 and made her maiden voyage on 9 November 2005. In July 2010, following the acquisition of Norfolkline by DFDS Seaways, the ship was renamed Dunkerque Seaways and rebranded in DFDS Seaways livery.

== Layout and facilities ==
'Dunkerque Seaways has three vehicle decks; a lower deck for freight vehicles only, a deck for mixed traffic and an upper deck for passenger cars. Her passenger facilities are arranged over two decks and include two restaurants, a bar, shop, children's play area and games arcade. There are seven lifts. The crew accommodation includes cabins, a dayroom, offices, laundry, stores, gymnasium and mess facilities for officers and crew.

A prominent feature on board are the large panoramic windows at the front and the side with their uninterrupted sea views.

== Sister ships ==
Dunkerque Seaways has two sister ships operating on the same service: Delft Seaways and Dover Seaways.
