= Tancrède Vallerey =

French writer (1892–1974)

Tancrède Vallerey (9 August 1892 – 10 November 1974) was a French writer of science fiction and speculative fiction.

== Life ==
Vallerey was born in Rosendaël, now incorporated into Dunkirk, in the Nord department of France, the son of Jules Vallerey (1853–1929), who after joining the French Navy became a teacher of hydrography, and published a number of technical and scientific works, and his wife Marie Madeleine Amélie (née Duhan) (1867 – 1954).

In 1914 he obtained the diplôme en droit (first level legal qualification) at Paris. No record is known of any military service in World War I. On 12 July 1918 at La Penne-sur-Huveaune (Bouches-du-Rhône) he married his first cousin Juliette Marie Chandon (21 November 1889 – 18 February 1940), sister of the astronomer Édmée Chandon; under the pen names Gisèle Vallerey, Georges Chandon, G. Chandon and Noël Guy she not only collaborated with her husband but also in her own right was a prolific author of original works of fiction, adaptations and translations and of song lyrics.

After his marriage Vallery moved to Grasse near Cannes, where he remained for the rest of his life and where he died on 10 November 1974.

== Works ==
=== Novels ===
- Celui qui viendra (1929)
- L'Ile au sable vert (1930) - winner of the 1930 Prix Jules-Verne
- L'avion fantastique (1936)
- Un mois sous les mers (1937)
- Le Manoir de Montsonore (1951)

=== Translations ===
From the German; published by Editions Nathan, collection Aventures et voyages:

- Radiopolis: Otfrid von Hanstein (1927)
- John Workmann ou Les cent millions du petit vendeur de journaux: Hans Dominik, adapted with Gisèle Vallerey (1928)
- Jusqu'à la Lune en fusée aérienne: Otfrid von Hanstein (1929)
- Dix mille lieues dans les airs: Otfrid von Hanstein, adapted with Gisèle Vallerey (1931)
- Les Héroïnes du Pacifique ou les robinsonnes du XXe siècle: Friedrich Wilhelm Mader (1931)
