= Dover Seaways =

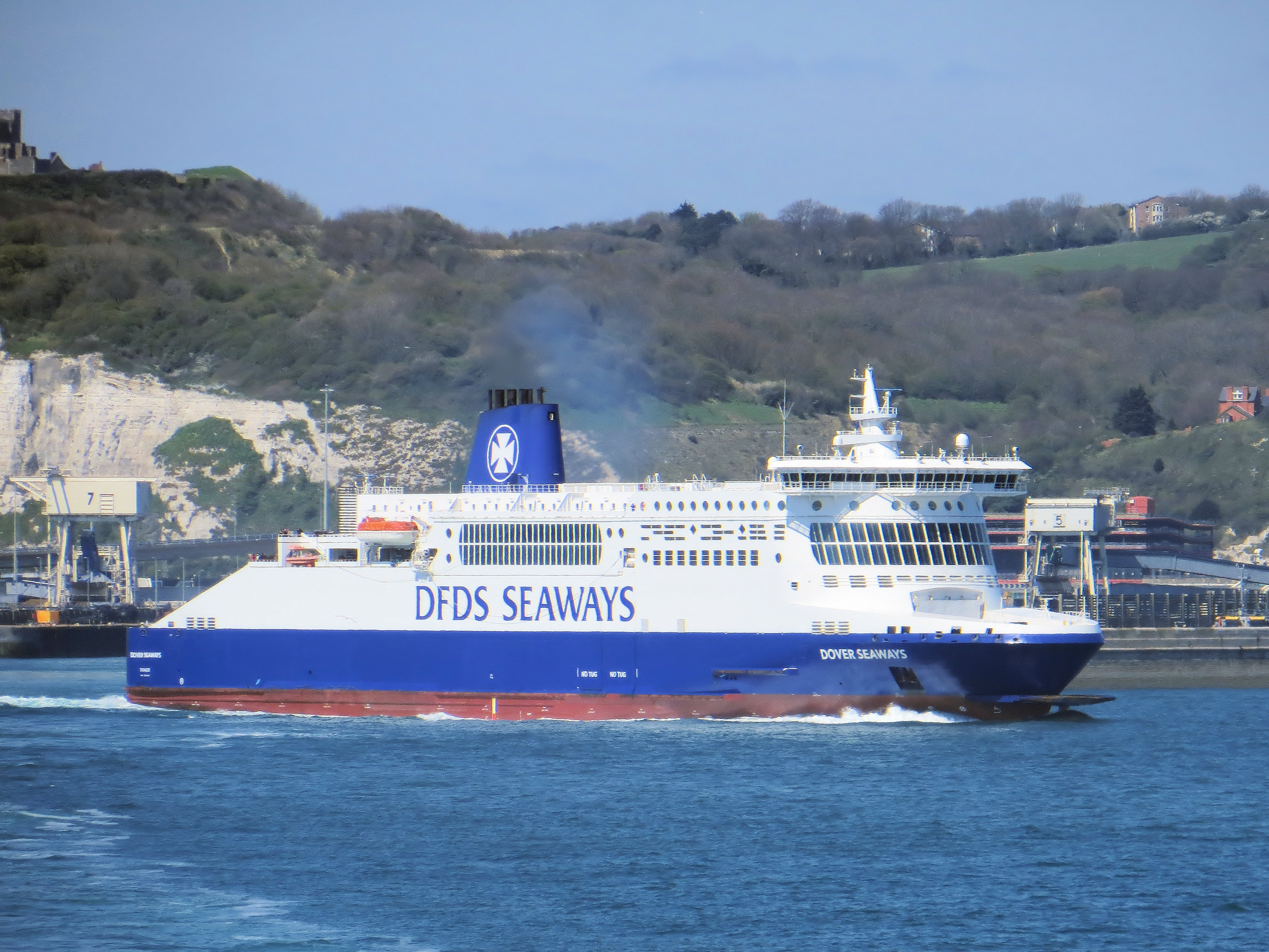
- Dover Seaways leaving Dover for Dunkerque

History
- Name: Maersk Dover (2005-2010); Dover Seaways (2010-present)
- Owner: Maersk Norfolkline (2005-2010); DFDS Seaways (2010-present)
- Operator: Maersk Norfolkline (2005-2010); DFDS Seaways (2010-present)
- Port of registry: Dover, United Kingdom
- Route: Dover - Dunkerque
- Ordered: 2004?
- Builder: Samsung Heavy Industries, Geoje, South Korea
- Launched: 24 October 2005
- Acquired: 21 June 2006
- Maiden voyage: 23 July 2006
- Identification: IMO number: 9318345; MMSI number: 235010500; Callsign: MLBZ6
- Status: In Service

General characteristics
- Class & type: D-class Roll-on/roll-off car ferry
- Tonnage: 35,923 GT; 6,787 tonnes deadweight (DWT)
- Length: 186.65 m (612.37 ft)
- Beam: 28.00 m (91.86 ft)
- Depth: 6.80 m (22.31 ft)
- Decks: 9
- Installed power: 4 × MAN 8L48/ 60B diesels; combined 38,400 kW
- Speed: 25 knots
- Capacity: 930 passengers; 200 cars; 120 trucks; 1800 lanemeters
- Crew: 75

Dover Seaways (previously Maersk Dover) is a Ro-Ro passenger ferry owned by DFDS Seaways and operated between Dover and Dunkerque. The ship was built for Norfolkline and was operated as Maersk Dover from 2006 to 2010 between Dover and Dunkerque.

In July 2010, DFDS Seaways purchased Norfolkline from Maersk, with the ship being renamed Dover Seaways and rebranded in DFDS branding. Despite the takeover, Dover Seaways continued on the Dover-Dunkerque route.

== Accidents & Incidents ==
=== 2014 Dock collision ===
On 9 November 2014, Dover Seaways collided with a harbour wall at the Port of Dover, shortly after leaving the port at 08:00. The ship was heading to Dunkirk, carrying 320 passengers. Several passengers were treated for minor injuries, and four were taken to hospital for additional treatment.
