= MS SeaFrance Cézanne =

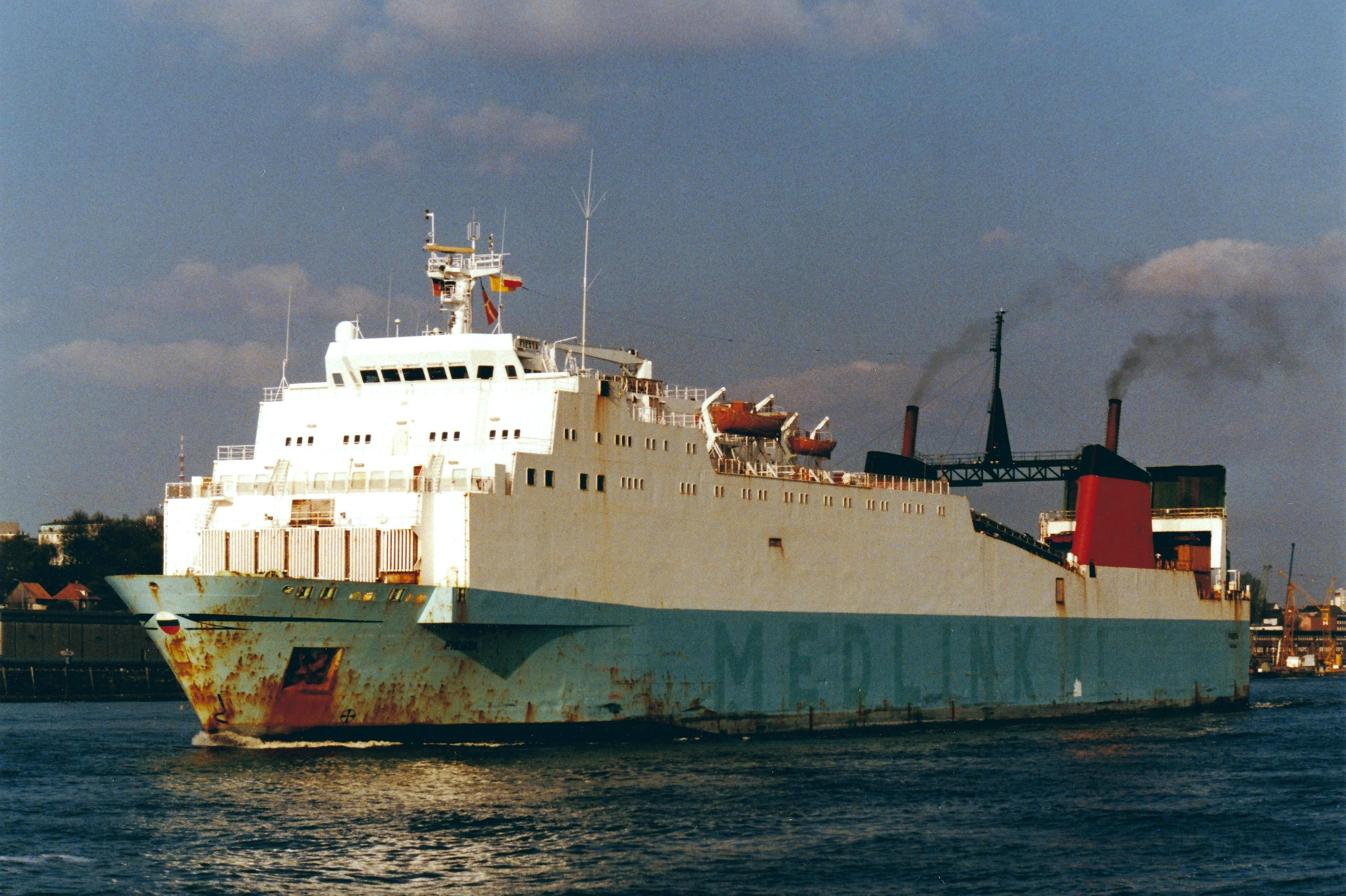
- Fiesta leaving Hamburg in 1989.

History
- Name: Western Light (2011–2012); SeaFrance Cézanne (1996–2011); Fiesta (1990–1996); Channel Seaway (1989–1990); Fantasia (1988–1989); Trapezitza (1981–1988); Soca (1980–1981); Ariadne (1980)
- Owner: Kimya Shipping Inc (2011–2012); S.N.A.T. (1999–2011); Societé Propietaire des Navaires (1990–1999); Sealink British Ferries (1988–1990); So Mejdunaroden Automobilen Transport (1981–1988); Rederi AB Nordö (1980–1981)
- Operator: SeaFrance (1996–2009); SNCF (1990–1996); Sealink British Ferries (1988–1990); DFDS Seaways (1988); Callitzis (1986–1988); MedLink (1981–1986); UMEF (1980–1981); Rederi AB Nordö (1980)
- Port of registry: Belize, Belize
- Ordered: 23 February 1979
- Builder: Kockums Varv AB, Sweden
- Yard number: 568
- Launched: 13 October 1979
- Christened: 13 October 1979
- In service: February 1980
- Out of service: 14 February 2009
- Identification: IMO number: 7806099; MMSI Number: 227010200; Call sign: FNBK
- Fate: Scrapped in India 2011

General characteristics
- Tonnage: 8,920 GRT
- Length: 163.51 m (536 ft 5 in)
- Beam: 23.04 m (75 ft 7 in)
- Draught: 28.4 m (93 ft 2 in)
- Propulsion: 2 × Sulzer 7RLA56
- Speed: 20 knots (37 km/h; 23 mph)

MS SeaFrance Cézanne was a ferry launched in 1979 as Ariadne. Starting life in the Mediterranean, she spent the majority of her career serving the Dover-Calais cross channel ferry route with Sealink, SNCF and SeaFrance, and was taken out of service in February 2009 and scrapped in 2011.

== Early years ==
SeaFrance Cézanne started life as Ariadne, ordered by and for Rederi AB Nordö, Malmö for services in the Eastern Mediterranean. She was launched at the Kockums Varv AB shipyard in Malmö, Sweden on 13 October 1979 and delivered to Rederi AB Nordö in January 1980. In February 1980, she was renamed Soca opening a service between Koper, Yugoslavia and Tartous, Syria with UMEF. On 7 June 1980, Soca's sister ship, MS Zenobia capsized on her maiden voyage roughly two kilometres (1.2 mi) away from Larnaca, Cyprus. This precipitated the end of Rederi's Yugoslavia to Syria service. In late 1981 the two remaining vessels Soca and her sister Scandinavia were sold to Bulgarian So Mejdunaroden Automobile Transport (SOMAT) and Soca was renamed Trapezitza. Under SOMAT ownership, Trapezitza was operated using the MedLink brand running trans-Mediterranean services to the Middle East.

== SNCF ==
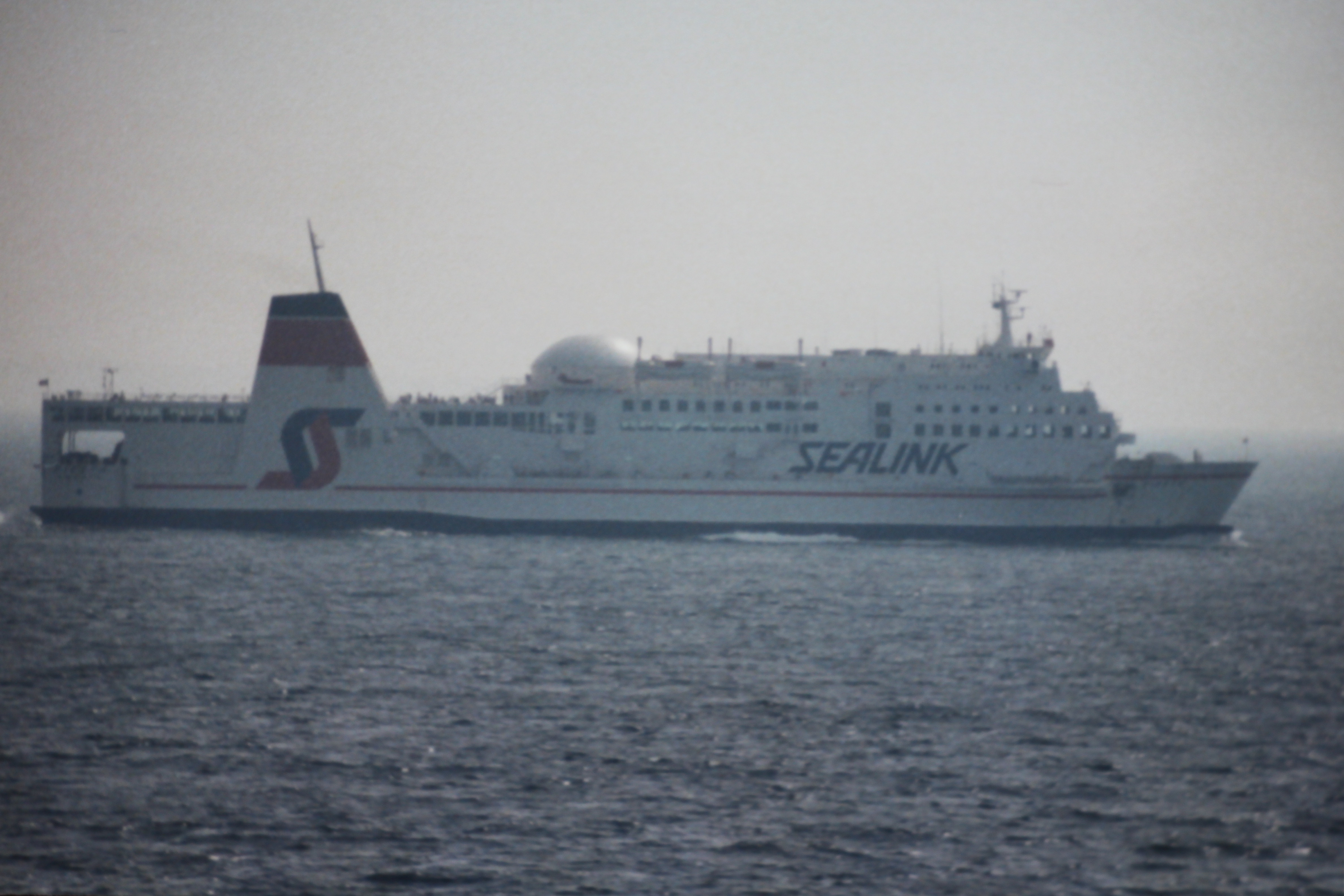
Fiesta crossing English Channel on 7 August 1993

In October 1988, under charter to DFDS Seaways, Trapezitza and her sister, which had been renamed Tzarvetz, were purchased by Sealink British Ferries and renamed initially to Fantasia and Fiesta respectively. After a short refit in Bremerhaven in 1989 Fantasia was again renamed Channel Seaway and began operating a freight service between Dover and Calais. Sealink eventually decided to use the two vessels, in a pooling agreement with SNCF to provide a joint service running between Dover and Calais. As a result of this decision, Channel Seaway and her sister, now named Fiesta were sent to Lloyd Werft, Bremerhaven in October 1989 to be converted from freight carriers to passenger carriers. As part of the pooling agreement, Channel Seaway was to be given to SNCF. As a result of this, whilst at Bremerhaven, the two vessels swapped names, Channel Seaway becoming Fiesta. Fiesta returned to Calais on 13 May 1990, however due to French industrial action, did not enter service until 9 July 1990. In 1989 ownership of the vessel transferred to Société Nouvelle d'Armement Transmanche (SNAT) and then in 1990, SNCF transferred the operations to Societé Propietaire des Navaires (SPN). In August 1990, SPN and Sealink British Ferries signed a five-year extension to their pooling agreement on board Fiesta in Dover harbour. The early 1990s was a difficult time for Fiesta, her services frequently being interrupted by industrial action, most notably in June/July 1991, April 1992 and February 1995.

== SeaFrance ==
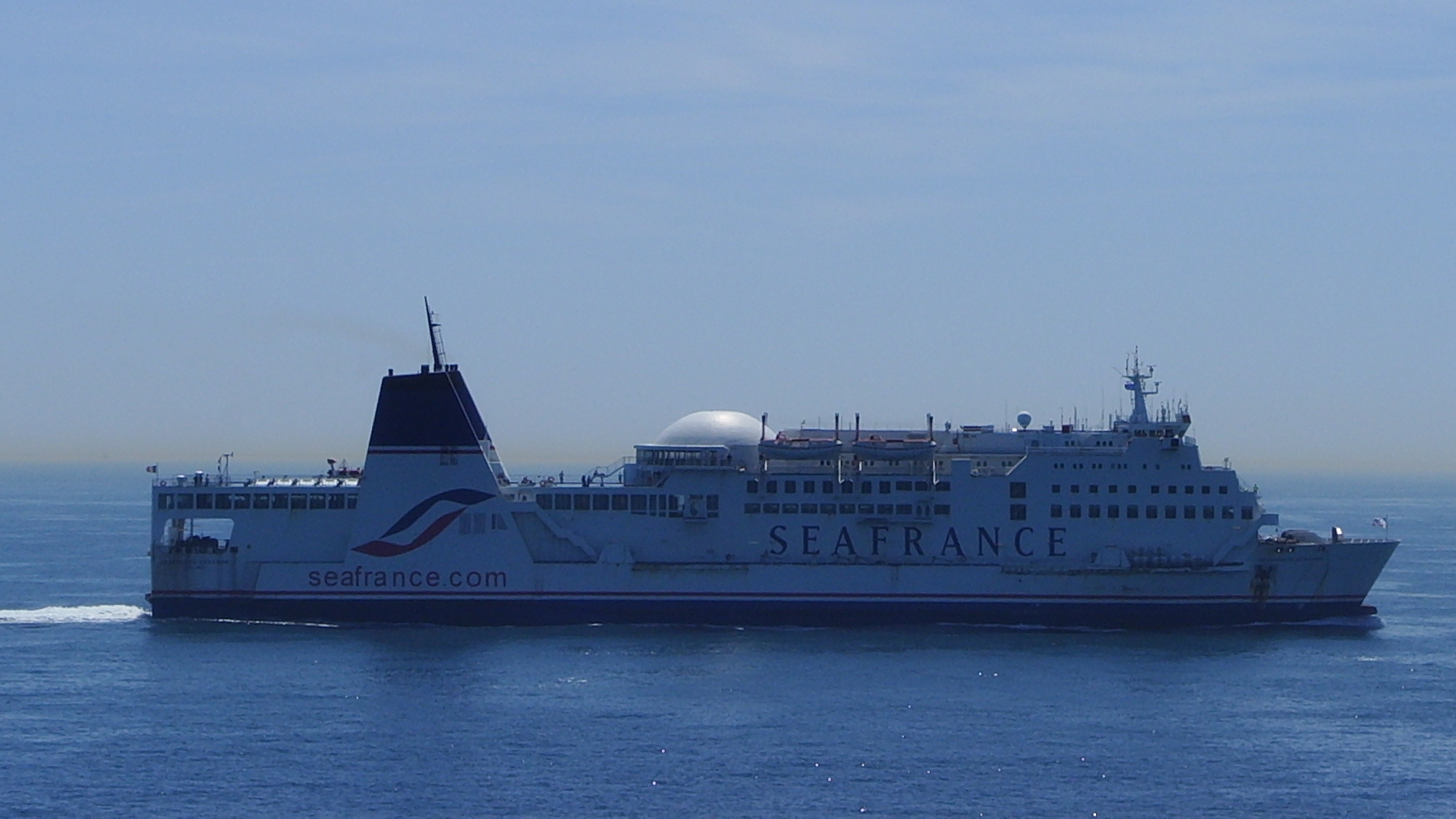
SeaFrance Cézanne on passage between Dover - Calais in July 2008

In July 1995, SPN and SNAT announced their intention to terminate the pooling agreement from 31 December. On 1 January 1996 SNCF's new SeaFrance service began, with Fiesta, which was renamed to SeaFrance Cézanne in her January 1996 refit. The service initially ran as three ships, SeaFrance Cézanne, SeaFrance Renoir and SeaFrance Nord Pas-de-Calais, later being joined by SeaFrance Monet and the SeaFrance Manet. On 22 March 2000, during thick fog, SeaFrance Cézanne was holed on the port side, which later required attention at Dunkerque.

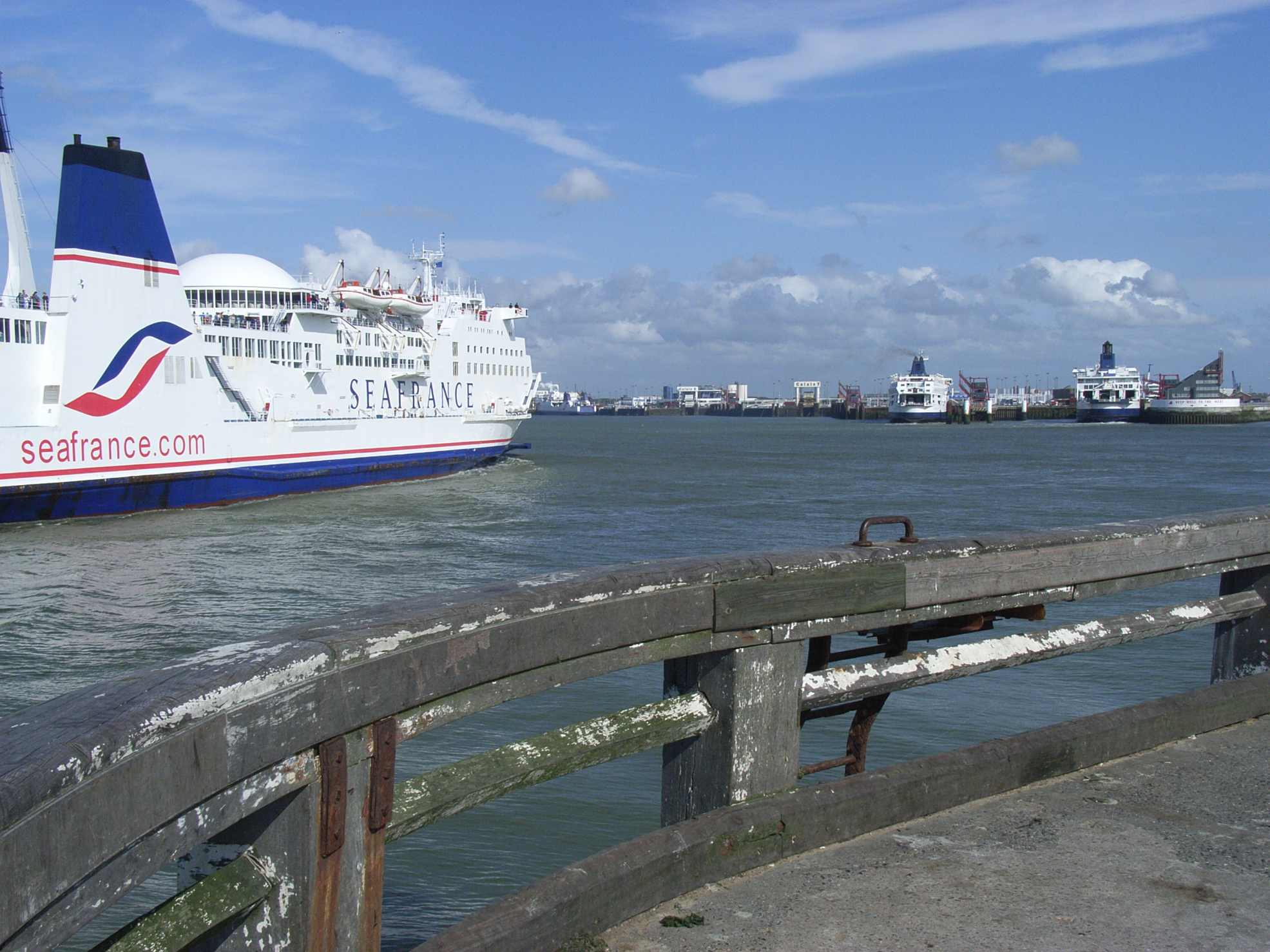
SeaFrance Cézanne in Calais harbor

Following the introduction of SeaFrance Rodin in 2001 and SeaFrance Berlioz in 2005, SeaFrance Cézanne was relegated to freight only duties alongside SeaFrance Nord Pas-De-Calais. Following the publication of a revised schedule in 2006, she was promoted back to passenger duties, maintaining this position until the introduction of SeaFrance Molière in late 2008 when she was again relegated to freight only crossings. She was permanently withdrawn from service on 12 February 2009 and was laid up in Dunkerque two days later.

In 2011 the ship was sold to Belize interests and renamed Western Light. In October 2011 she departed from Dunkerque for Alang, India for scrapping.

== Sister ships ==
SeaFrance Cézanne had two sister ships:

- Stena Fantasia - Operating as Wawel Gdańsk-Nynashamn with Polferries
- Zenobia - Capsized on maiden voyage in June 1980
