= Dover–Calais ferry =

Dover–Calais ferry may refer to any of several ferry routes across the English Channel between Dover and Calais:

Current operators

- DFDS Seaways France, a Danish shipping company
- P&O Ferries, a British shipping company that operates ferries
- Irish Ferries, an Irish shipping company which began its service in April 2021

Former operators

- Hoverspeed, a British shipping company that operated hovercraft and catamarans
- Seaspeed, hovercraft services operated by British Rail in conjunction with French railway operator SNCF
- MyFerryLink, a French passenger and freight ferry company

== See also ==
- Dover–Calais, 1986 song performed by Style
- English Channel#Ferry, a list of cross-channel ferry routes
