= MS Côte d'Albâtre =

RO-RO passenger ferry built in 2006

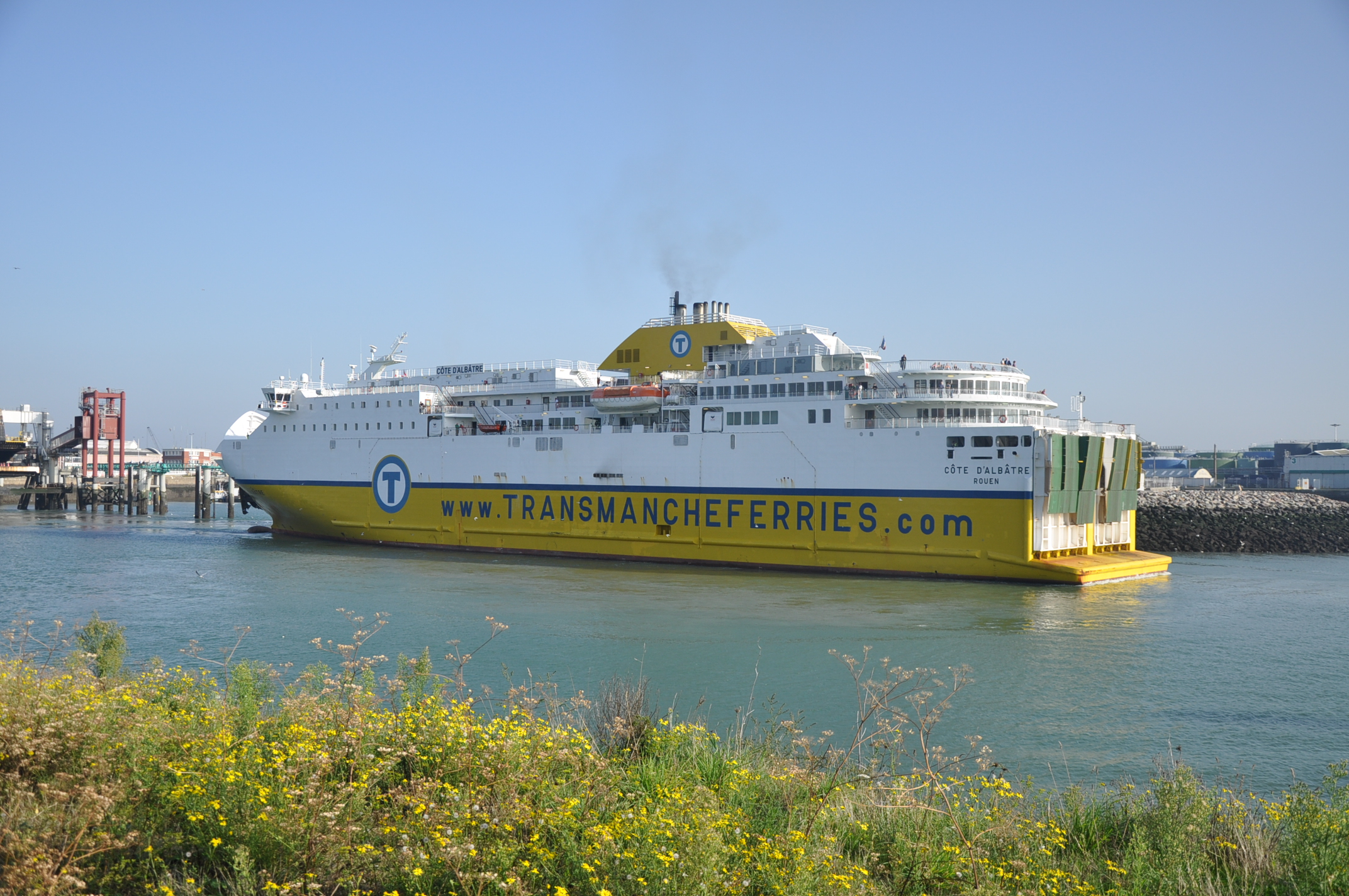

History
- Name: Côte d'Albâtre
- Owner: Seine-Maritime
- Operator: DFDS Seaways France 2012–onwards; LD Lines 2006–2012; Transmanche Ferries 2006
- Port of registry: Rouen, France
- Builder: HJ Barreras, Spain
- Yard number: 1645
- Launched: 22 July 2005
- Acquired: October 2005
- Maiden voyage: 6 March 2006
- Identification: IMO number: 9320128
- Status: In service

Côte d'Albâtre is a roll-on/roll-off passenger ferry operated by DFDS Seaways France between Newhaven in England and Dieppe in France. Built in 2006 for Transmanche Ferries which was then dissolved it moved to LD Lines, which then merged their channel interests with DFDS Seaways to form DFDS Seaways France. Côte d'Albâtre has one sister ship which is Seven Sisters which had previously operated between Portsmouth in the UK and Le Havre in France but joined Côte d'Albâtre at Dieppe in 2015.

She is also identical to several other ships operated by Balearia and Navairas ARMAS in Spain. She is powered by two Wärtsilä 8L46C 8-cylinder inline main engines. Electrical power is provided by two shaft generators 1500 kW each, three diesel generators 1100 kW each and one emergency generator 270 kW.
