= Rodin-class ferry =

Rodin class
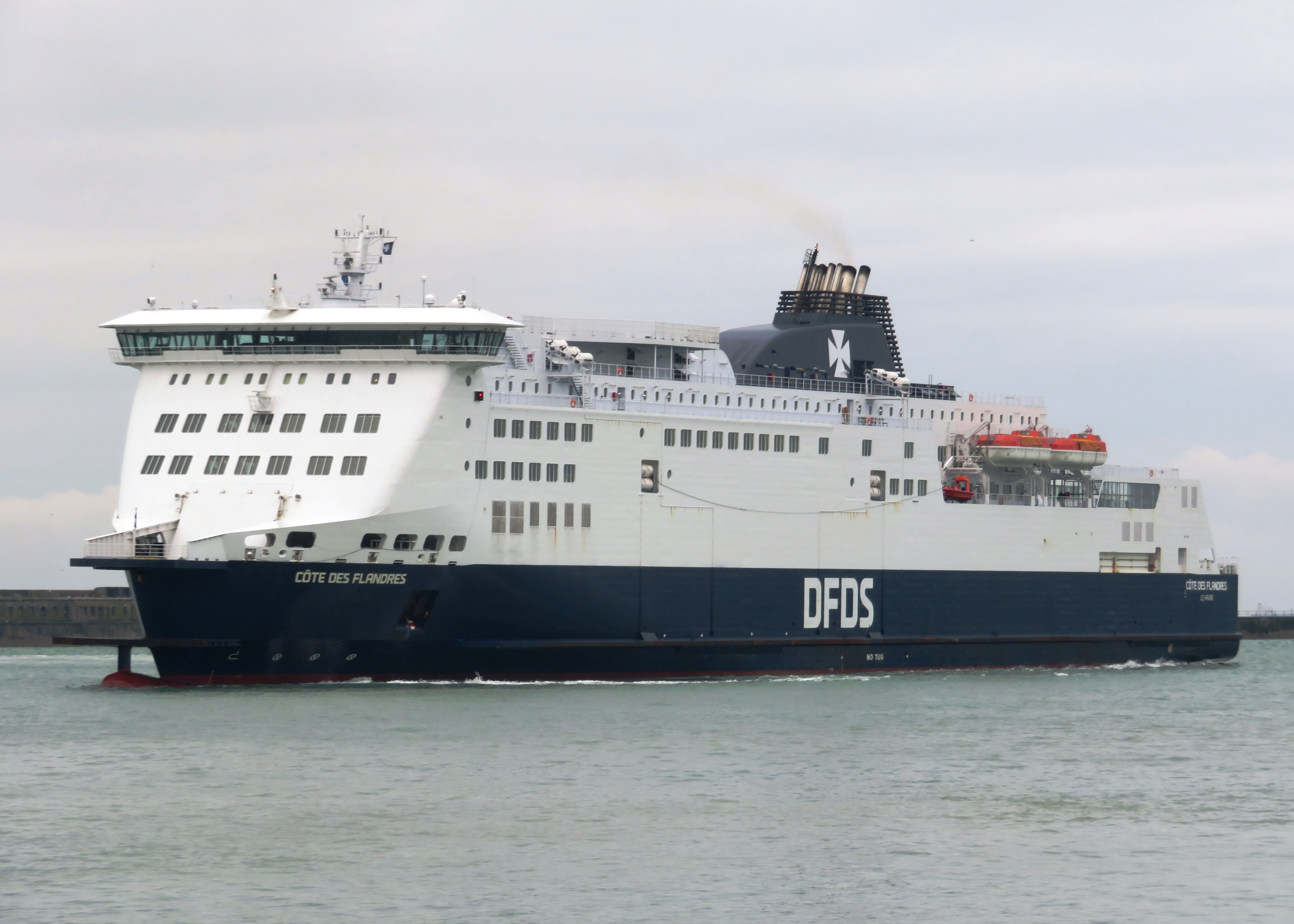
- Côte des Flandres (former SeaFrance Berlioz) in Dover Harbour

Class overview
- Builders: Chantiers de l'Atlantique, Saint-Nazaire, France (Côte des Flandres); Aker Finnyards, Rauma, Finland (Côte des Dunes)
- Operators: SeaFrance 2001–2012; MyFerryLink 2012-2015; DFDS Seaways 2010–present
- Built: 2001–2005
- In service: 2001–present
- Planned: 2
- Completed: 2

General characteristics
- Tonnage: 33,796 GT
- Length: 185.82 m (609 ft 8 in)
- Beam: 27.7 m (90 ft 11 in)
- Draught: 6.5 m (21 ft 4 in)
- Decks: 9
- Propulsion: 2 × Wärtsilä 8L46B + 2x 12V46B diesels, 4 engines total
- Speed: 25 knots (46 km/h; 29 mph)
- Capacity: 2000 passengers; 2000 lane metres; 120 lorries or 700 cars
- Crew: 70

The Rodin-class ferries are a duo of ferries operated by DFDS, formerly by SeaFrance and MyFerryLink. The two ferries were built between 2001 and 2005 and operate between Dover and Calais.
