= MV SeaFrance Renoir =

History
- Name: 1981–1996: Cote D'Azur; 1996–2009: SeaFrance Renoir; 2011: Eastern Light
- Owner: 1981–1990: SNCF; 1990–1996: SPN; 1996–2011: SeaFrance; 2011: Emily Shipping Inc
- Operator: 1981–1990: SNCF; 1990–1996: SPN; 1996–2009: SeaFrance
- Port of registry: Belize, Belize
- Route: Dover-Calais
- Builder: Ateliers et Chantiers du Havre, Le Havre, France
- Yard number: 256
- Launched: 22 December 1980.
- In service: 29 September 1981
- Out of service: August 2009
- Identification: IMO number: 7920534
- Fate: Scrapped

General characteristics
- Tonnage: 8,862 GT
- Length: 130.03 m (427 ft)
- Beam: 23.02 m (76 ft)
- Installed power: 2 18-cylinder Pielstick – Atlantique 18PC2/5V diesels
- Speed: 18 kn (33.34 km/h)
- Capacity: 596 passengers (1981) 1,400 (1996), 330 cars, 43 freight vehicles

MV SeaFrance Renoir is a 'steel twin screw motor vessel' previously owned by SeaFrance and operated on their Dover—Calais route. Originally named Côte D'Azur, she was built in 1981 for SNCF. However, in 1990, SPN took over ownership of Côte D'Azur; who later marketed as SeaFrance – where the ship was renamed SeaFrance Renoir.

== Service history ==
She was built in 1981, for SNCF by Ateliers et Chantiers du Havre, Le Havre and named Côte D'Azur. She entered service on 29 September on the Calais-Dover route; also serving on the Boulogne-Dover route shared with their Sealink partners. In 1990, ownership of Côte D'Azur was transferred to Societé Propietaire des Navaires (SPN) in which Stena Line took a 49% interest (Stena having acquired the UK-owned Sealink operation).

From 1996, SPN marketed their services as SeaFrance. Côte D'Azur was rebuilt in Le Havre in January 1996, returning to service as the SeaFrance Renoir. In 1999, Stena Line sold their 49% back to SPN. Following the delivery of SeaFrance Rodin in 2001, SeaFrance Renoir is classed as the spare ship, but occasionally operates extra services during the summer (for example on Saturday 21 June 2003, she made one morning return trip to Dover). By 30 November 2001, she was taken out of service and laid up in Dunkerque. 3 January 2006, SeaFrance Renoir was back in service on the Calais – Dover route. Conversely, SeaFrance announced on 27 December 2007, that they have purchased a new vessel to replace both the SeaFrance Manet and SeaFrance Renoir; and by 10 April 2009, she retired to lay-by at Calais.

On 1 September 2009 she proceeded to Dunkerque for continued lay up and sale. In addition, 2 June 2010 she is listed by ship register `Bureau Veritas' with the definitive classification `laid up'. The ship was sold to Belize interests in 2011 and renamed M/F Eastern Light, leaving Dunkerque in October 2011 for an unknown destination but widely believed to be a scrapyard. Arrived at Alang for breaking up 31 October 2011 and subsequently beached on 9 November 2011 for dismantling.
