= Transmanche Ferries =

Brand of Ferry

- Type: Limited
- Founded: 2001
- Headquarters: Dieppe, France
- Area served: English Channel
- Services: Passenger transportation Freight transportation
- Website: www.transmancheferries.co.uk

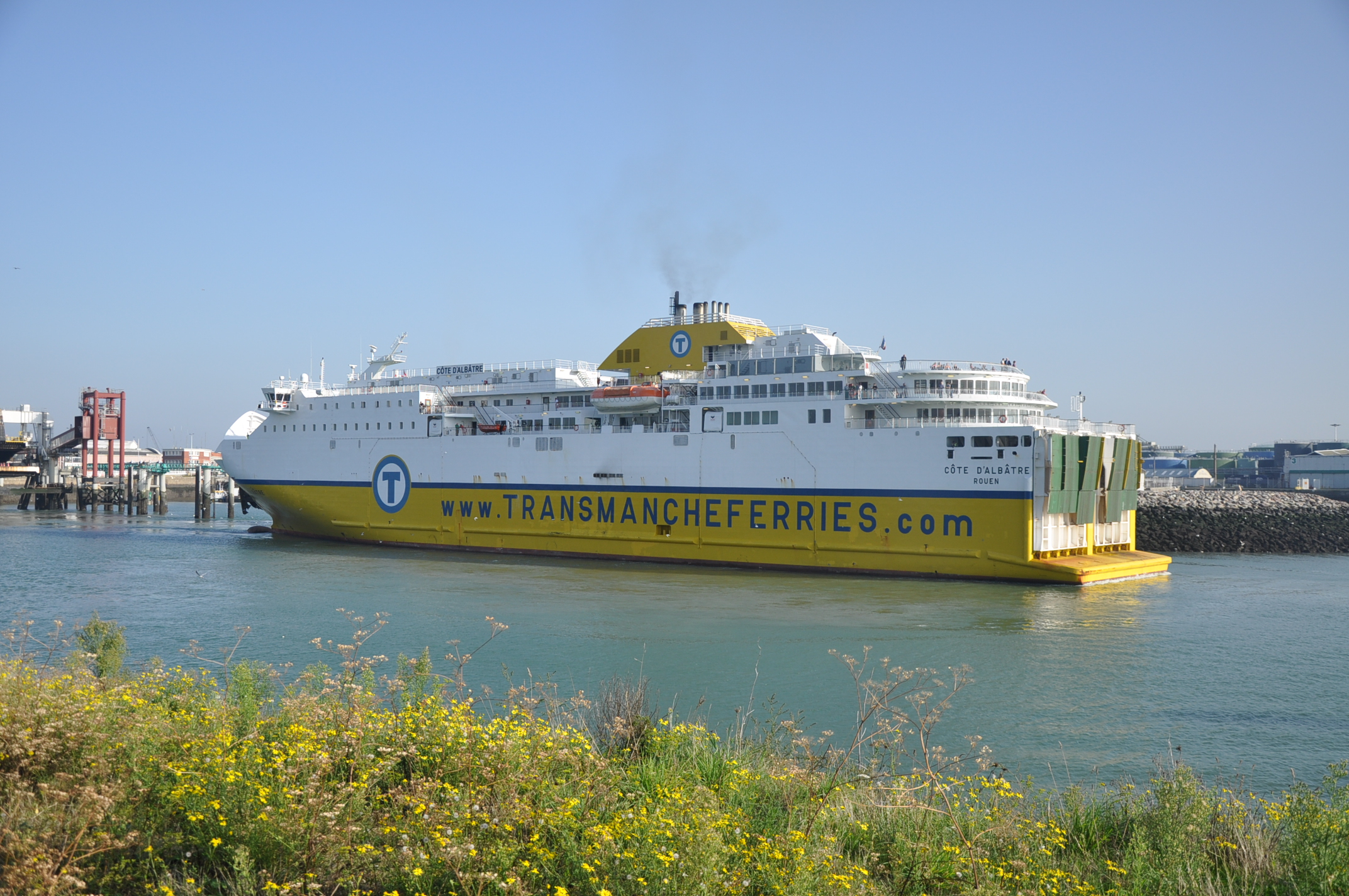
Côte d'Albâtre in Le Havre

Transmanche Ferries is a brand name for the ships on the Newhaven - Dieppe route across the English Channel. The ferry route is operated by DFDS Seaways.

== History ==
Transmanche Ferries was formed after the previous operator of this route, P&O Stena Line, decided to concentrate on that company's primary route of Dover - Calais. The last P&O Stena vessel on the route, the Stena Cambria, undertook her last sailing on 31 January 1999. No vessel replaced the Stena Cambria service until a high speed passenger service was instituted by Hoverspeed using SuperSeaCat Two in April 1999, however this service ended in 2005.

Despite the Hoverspeed passenger service, a conventional passenger-vehicle freight service was desired for the Dieppe - Newhaven route. Compiled of public bodies, including the General Council of Seine-Maritime, the towns of Dieppe and Fécamp as well as three Chambers of Commerce, Transmanche Ferries re-opened the route early in 2001 with the chartered Sardinia Vera.

In 2006, Seine-Maritime ran a concession to find a tender to run the Transmanche Services and in December 2006, LD Lines won the tender to run the service and LD Lines then consequently took over the services with the Transmanche Ferries brand which was eventually dissolved into LD Lines although the two newbuilds, Cote D'Albatre and Seven Sisters remained in their original Transmanche Ferries livery even up until this day when they run their services with the Transmanche livery instead of a different livery.

In 2012 shortly after SeaFrance went into liquidation, LD Lines and DFDS started a joint service between Dover and Calais which was soon to be brought under the name of New Channel Company A/S or known as DFDS Seaways France which included the Newhaven-Dieppe, Portsmouth-Le Havre, Dover-Calais and the Dover-Dunkerque which was then all transferred over to DFDS.

By the end of 2014, DFDS and Seine-Maritime reached an agreement to continue running the service, and the contract has been renewed on a rolling basis, most recently in Oct 2022 for another 5 years. The 2023 Summer timetable will see three crossings each way per day weekdays, with up to four at weekends. This will be the highest service frequency for nearly 30 years. The winter schedule will continue to consist of two crossings most days.

== Fleet ==
Ship	Built	Entered service	Gross tonnage	Length	Beam	Service speed	Vessel type	Port of registry	Current status
Côte d'Albâtre	2005	2006	18,564 GT	143.00 m	24 m	22 knots	Roll-on/roll-off ferry	Rouen	In Service
Seven Sisters	2006	2006	18,564 GT	143.00 m	24 m	22 knots	Roll-on/roll-off ferry	Dieppe	In Service

When Transmanche started, it chartered the 1975 built Sardinia Vera from Corsica Ferries. With a capacity of just under 2,000 passengers and 43 lorries she provided an adequate starting point for the company. At 120m long and with a draught of 5.5m she fits into both ports perfectly. The company simply re-used the current livery of Corsica ferries and since then it has stuck, with their new ferries also painted in the same colour scheme, with the trademark large green ‘T’ in an identically coloured circle.

The decision was then taken in 2002 to purchase another ship to boost the number of crossings that Transmanche was able to offer. The Saga Star was purchased, re-painted and named as Dieppe. At 147m long, she was a little too big for the port of Newhaven and therefore had to reverse out before turning around the pier head, instead of swinging inside the harbour, as Sardinia Vera did. Although with a slightly larger vehicle capacity, she does not have the facilities of Sardinia Vera, but is just as suited to the freight market.

Soon however, the decision was made to order two new-builds specifically for the route. Constructed at H.J Barreras in Vigo, Spain, the Côte D’Albatre entered service in March 2006. At 142 metres long, and with a draught of 5.7m, she is the maximum-sized ferry that Newhaven can currently safely accommodate. With a modern, luxury interior she gave a well needed boost to the company's profile, as well as attracting day trippers that were lost when Hoverspeed ended its SuperSeaCat service in 2004. Her sister vessel Seven Sisters followed that same year.

Sardinia Vera was returned to her owner, Corsica Ferries, following the introduction of Côte D’Albatre. The identical Seven Sisters joined this vessel in Autumn 2006, albeit with several modifications. In November 2006, Dieppe was sold and is now sailing for Polferries as the Baltiva, as of 2024.

Seven Sisters was being used on the Portsmouth - Le Havre route, which DFDS served until that link closed at end of 2014. Côte D’Albatre, therefore, has now been joined by Seven Sisters, they make several crossings a day between Newhaven - Dieppe. The route is currently run only by DFDS, having agreed with the Conseil General Seine Maritime to continue this service in 2015. No other companies had expressed interest in running this loss making service.

Transmanche has attempted to serve other routes in the past, between Newhaven and Le Havre and between Dieppe and Dover, but neither of these has proved successful.

== See also ==
- LD Lines
