= LD Lines =

Former French passenger and freight shipping company

- Founded: 2005
- Defunct: 2014
- Fate: Partly sold to DFDS Seaways and partly shut down
- Headquarters: Suresnes, France
- Area served: English Channel; Bay of Biscay
- Key people: Pierre Gehanne, Chairman
- Services: Passenger transportation Freight transportation
- Parent: Louis Dreyfus Armateurs
- Divisions: New Channel Company
- Website: www.ldlines.com

LD Lines was a French shipping company, with both roro freight and passenger ferry operations. It was a subsidiary of Louis Dreyfus Armateurs (LDA), which engages in building, owning, operating, and managing vessels. LD Lines operated ferry routes on the English Channel, the Bay of Biscay and the Mediterranean Sea.

In 2013, part of LD Lines was spun off and merged with the English Channel operations of DFDS Seaways to form DFDS Seaways France. In September 2014, the Poole-Gijon/Santander route closed and the Norman Asturias was immediately laid up off the coast of Saint Nazaire. In mid-September 2014, the Saint Nazaire-Gijon route was suspended and the Norman Asturias was sent to Algeciras and the Norman Atlantic to Messina.

== History ==
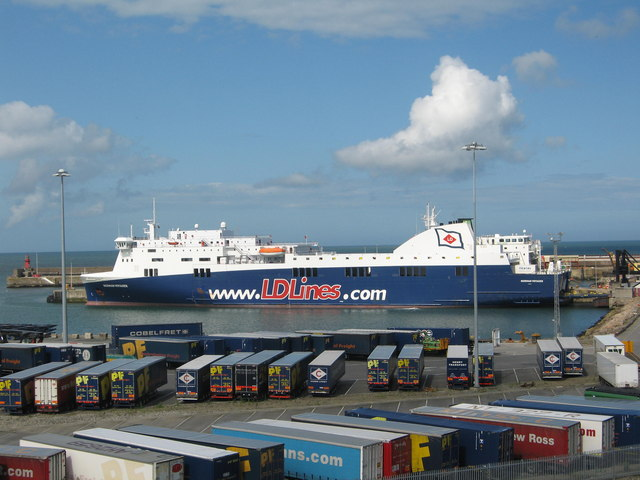
Norman Voyager at Rosslare

=== Le Havre–Portsmouth ===
LD Lines' English Channel operations commenced in October 2005, operating between Portsmouth Harbour, England and Le Havre, France. This service was introduced following the withdrawal of P&O Ferries' long-standing operation on this route.

Initially there was one sailing per day in each direction, with the Portsmouth–Le Havre sailing taking place overnight. This utilised one vessel, the MS Norman Spirit, which is ironically a former P&O vessel (used on its Dover–Calais route until May 2005). In 2008 the Norman Voyager was introduced on the route, she was withdrawn in September 2009 and chartered to Celtic Link Ferries for service between Cherbourg and Rosslare and Cherbourg and Portsmouth. In November 2009 Norman Spirit was moved to the Dover–Boulogne route, her place was taken by Cote d'Albatre, which remained on the route until the Norman Spirit return in 2011.

On 13 July 2007 it was reported that LD Lines had ordered a new ro-pax ferry for the route from Singapore Technologies Engineering, with an option for another ship of the same type. The ship, the Norman Leader, was to be capable of carrying 1215 passengers and enter service in 2010 on the Le Havre–Portsmouth route. On 17 March 2011, the contract for the purchase of the vessel was cancelled. Reasons given for the cancellation were the delays and questions about the tonnage. The Norman Spirit resumed sailing on the Portsmouth–Le Havre route in early 2011, but was chartered to DFDS Seaways in November 2011 to increase capacity on the Dover–Dunkirk route following the collapse of SeaFrance. Norman Spirit's place was taken by the Norman Voyager.

The Portsmouth-Le Havre service was transferred to DFDS Seaways France in 2013, fully marketed as a DFDS Seaways route. DFDS announced in September 2014 that it would discontinue the route due to its unprofitability, and its last crossing was on 31 December 2014.

=== Dieppe–Newhaven ===
LD Lines was one of five companies invited to tender for the operation of Transmanche Ferries service between Dieppe and Newhaven. P&O Stena Line operated the route until 1998 after which Hoverspeed operated the route until 2004. Because the French government did not want the route to be lost, they started a new subsidised company by the name of Transmanche Ferries in April 2001. After five years of successful service and the arrival of two newbuilds, the government decided to tender the line in a concession. The contract to operate the service was awarded to LD Lines on 21 December 2006. For this service they were slated to receive an annual subsidy of up to €14.6 million. LD Lines commenced sailings on this route on 1 May 2007. In addition to three round trips between Dieppe and the Port of Newhaven, LD Lines started a single round trip per day between Le Havre and Newhaven during high season using the MS Seven Sisters. However, in August 2008 they announced that this service would not be continued. Currently there are two sailings per day each way, (3 in high season) using the Cote d'Albatre and Seven Sisters.

The Dieppe-Newhaven service was transferred to DFDS Seaways France in 2013 and is now fully marketed as a DFDS Seaways route.

=== Dover–Calais ===
LD Lines and DFDS Seaways announced on 7 February 2012 that they would be launching a joint service between Dover and Calais, commencing on 17 February 2012, using the Norman Spirit. The two companies had previously submitted a joint bid for the assets of SeaFrance which was turned down. DFDS later chartered the Barfleur from Brittany Ferries to increase the number of sailings on the new route, she was replaced by the Dieppe Seaways.

The Dover-Calais service was transferred to DFDS Seaways France in 2013 and is now fully marketed as a DFDS Seaways route. Norman Spirit has since been renamed Calais Seaways and again to Isle of Innisfree.

=== Fate ===
In March 2012, DFDS and LDA entered into an agreement to form a new company that combines DFDS and LD Lines ferry routes in the English Channel and one route between France and Tunisia. During 2013 LD Lines Portsmouth-Le Havre, Newhaven-Dieppe and share of Dover-Calais operation were transferred to the new company known as DFDS Seaways France along with DFDS Seaways Dover-Dunkirk service. DFDS Seaways France is 82% owned by DFDS with the remaining 18% owned by Louis Dreyfus Armateurs. LD Lines Saint-Nazaire–Gijón (and later UK and Ireland - Biscay service) was not included in the transaction.

LDA sold its remaining share in the venture to DFDS in late 2014 and the venture became fully merged into DFDS.

== Former routes ==
=== Saint-Nazaire–Gijón ===
LD Lines launched a Saint-Nazaire–Gijón service on 2 September 2010 using the Norman Bridge. This route received a European Union subsidy as part of its Motorways of the Sea project. Such was the success of the service that the Norman Bridge was replaced by the larger Baltic Amber which was renamed Norman Asturias. Following the opening of the Poole-Santander route the Norman Asturias was replaced with the Scintu which has since been renamed Norman Atlantic. This route is currently suspended with Norman Atlantic released elsewhere.

=== Poole-Santander ===
On 3 November 2013, LD Lines launched a service between Poole, England and Santander, Spain, using the Norman Asturias. This service was formerly operated by Brittany Ferries. The route closed on 7 September 2014.

=== Poole-Gijón ===
This service commenced on 4 January 2014, using the Norman Asturias. The crossing time was 25 hours, the route closed on 7 September 2014.

=== Rosslare-Saint-Nazaire ===
This service commenced in January 2014, using the Norman Atlantic. It was also marketed as a Rosslare-Gijón via Saint-Nazaire service as the Norman Atlantic on its usual Saint-Nazaire–Gijón after its round trip to Rosslare. The route closed at the end of August 2014.

=== Ramsgate–Ostend ===
LD Lines began operating this route from 18 March 2010 in partnership with TransEuropa Ferries, using the Norman Spirit, which has been renamed the Ostend Spirit. They also sold space on a TransEuropa Ferries vessel, the MV Larkspur. In March 2011, TransEuropa Ferries terminated their agreement with LD Lines and the chartered Norman Spirit was returned to LD lines.

=== Le Havre–Rosslare ===
In November 2008, LD Lines opened a weekly passenger and freight service between Le Havre and Rosslare, Republic of Ireland. The Norman Voyager operated on the route departing from Le Havre on Fridays and returning from Rosslare on Saturdays. The crossing time was 20 hours. A significant customer of this service was Citroen, who used the route to transport new cars to Ireland. The route closed when Norman Voyager was chartered to Celtic Link.

=== Dover–Dieppe ===
In February 2009, the company started sailing between Dover and Dieppe. The service operated daily with a journey time of around 4 hours 15 minutes, using the ferry Cote d'Albatre. This was the first time that these two ports had been connected with a ferry service. The Dover–Dieppe service ceased on 29 June 2009, due to lack of traffic.

=== Dover–Boulogne ===
LD Lines and Boulogne Chamber of Commerce announced on 4 July 2008 that LD Lines would open a service between Boulogne and Dover from 1 July 2009. It was initially planned that the company would initially operate four round trips a day between the two ports using the Norman Spirit. with a second ship joining the route at a later date. In January 2009 it was announced by LD Lines that the route would start early and begin operating from 12 February 2009, using the Côte d’Albâtre, and that the Norman Spirit will, therefore, remain on the Portsmouth–Le Havre route.

Because the new Boulogne ferry terminal was not due to be completed until July 2009, the service initially utilised the terminal formerly used by SpeedFerries. For this service and the former Dover–Dieppe route, the Côte d’Albâtre was chartered to LD Lines from the Seine Maritime Council. The Côte d’Albâtre was joined in June 2009 by the 112-metre high-speed catamaran Norman Arrow, which operated four additional round trips on the route. Norman Arrow was built by Incat and was chartered from Irish-based MGC Chartering. She was the largest catamaran operating on the English Channel. Norman Arrow was deemed unsuccessful on the route and replaced by Norman Spirit in November 2009, she remained on the route until she was switched to a joint service with TransEuropa Ferries. Norman Spirit was replaced by Norman Bridge and Norman Trader.

On 16 August 2010 LD Lines confirmed that the Norman Bridge would be removed from the Dover–Boulogne route on 31 August 2010 and would be used on the St. Nazaire–Gijon route. The remaining services (operated by the Norman Trader) ceased on 5 September 2010.

== Past ships ==
Ship	Built	Status
Norman Asturias	2007	Returned to Stena RoRo, currently on charter to Brittany Ferries.
Norman Atlantic	2009	Returned to Visentini, on charter to Anek-Superfast. Caught fire in December 2014
Norman Arrow	2009	Now KatExpress 1 with Max Mols
Norman Trader	1998	Now Kaiarahi with Interislander of New Zealand
Norman Bridge	1998	Now MS Aquarius Brasil with Equinox Offshore
Norman Leader	2010	Order cancelled by LD Lines; vessel sold to Nova Star Cruises. Now Nova Star with Polferries
Deal Seaways	1992	Returned to Brittany Ferries, renamed Barfleur
Norman Voyager	2008	Returned to Stena Line, renamed Stena Livia
Norman Spirit	1991	Transferred to DFDS Seaways France as Calais Seaways
Dieppe Seaways	2002	Transferred to DFDS Seaways France
Cote d'Albatre	2006	Transferred to DFDS Seaways France
Seven Sisters	2006	Transferred to DFDS Seaways France

LD Lines' vessel Norman Leader was due for delivery in summer 2011. The order was cancelled due to "capacities of the vessel not corresponding with those specified originally". The Leader is slated to enter service on the Portland, Maine–Yarmouth, Nova Scotia route in 2014 as the Nova Star.

The French press reported on 23 March 2012 that LD Lines had chartered the Barfleur from Brittany Ferries in partnership with DFDS Seaways for their Dover–Calais service, to be put into service starting 27 April and renamed MS Deal Seaways.
