= MS Zenobia =

RO-RO ferry that capsized and sank near Larnaca, Cyprus

- Zenobia listing in June 1980

History
- Name: Zenobia
- Owner: Rederi AB Nordö
- Port of registry: Sweden
- Builder: Kockums Varv AB, Sweden
- Launched: 11 August 1979
- Acquired: Late 1979
- Maiden voyage: May/June 1980
- Identification: IMO number: 7806087
- Fate: Sank close to Larnaca on 7 June 1980

General characteristics
- Type: Challenger-class roll-on/roll-off ferry
- Tonnage: 10,000 GRT
- Length: 172.2 m (565 ft 0 in)
- Beam: 28 m (91 ft 10 in)
- Draught: 13.01 m (42 ft 8 in)

MS Zenobia was a Swedish-built Challenger-class RO-RO ferry launched in 1979 that capsized and sank in the Mediterranean Sea, close to Larnaca, Cyprus, in June 1980. She now rests on her port side in approximately 42 meters (138 ft) of water and was named by The Times, and many others, as one of the top ten wreck diving sites in the world.

== History ==
Zenobia was built at the Kockums Varv AB shipyard in Sweden and was delivered to her owners Rederi AB Nordö in late 1979. She left Malmö, Sweden, on her maiden voyage bound for Tartous, Syria, on 4 May 1980, loaded with 104 tractor-trailers with cargo destined for the Mediterranean and the Middle East. She passed through the Strait of Gibraltar on 22 May 1980, stopping first at Heraklion, Crete, and then to Piraeus, Athens, Greece. On the way to Athens the captain noticed steering problems and Zenobia began listing to port. Following checks, it was determined the list was caused by excess water that had been pumped into the ballast tanks; this water was pumped out and she then departed for her second to last stop at Larnaca, Cyprus, before reaching Syria.

She arrived at Larnaca on 2 June 1980, where the ballast problem had reoccurred, engineers discovered that the computerized pumping system was pumping excess water into the side ballast tanks due to a software error, making the list progressively worse. On 4 June, Zenobia was towed out of Larnaca harbor to prevent her becoming an obstruction should the worst happen and was left at anchor roughly 1–1.5 miles (1.6–2.4 km) offshore. On 5 June, with the ship listing at around 45° the captain dismissed the engineers and maintenance crew, and requested permission to return the ship to Larnaca harbor. The requests were denied.

At around 2:30 am on 7 June 1980, Zenobia capsized and sank in Larnaca Bay at 34°53.5′N 33°39.1′E (1,500 m, 4,900 ft from the shore) to a depth of roughly 42 meters (138 ft), taking her estimated £200 million worth of cargo with her. There were no casualties in the disaster.

A Discovery Channel documentary investigated the theory whether Zenobia was sabotaged by Mossad and MI6.

Of her two sister ships, Wawel is still operational as of March 2025; SeaFrance Cézanne was scrapped in October 2011.

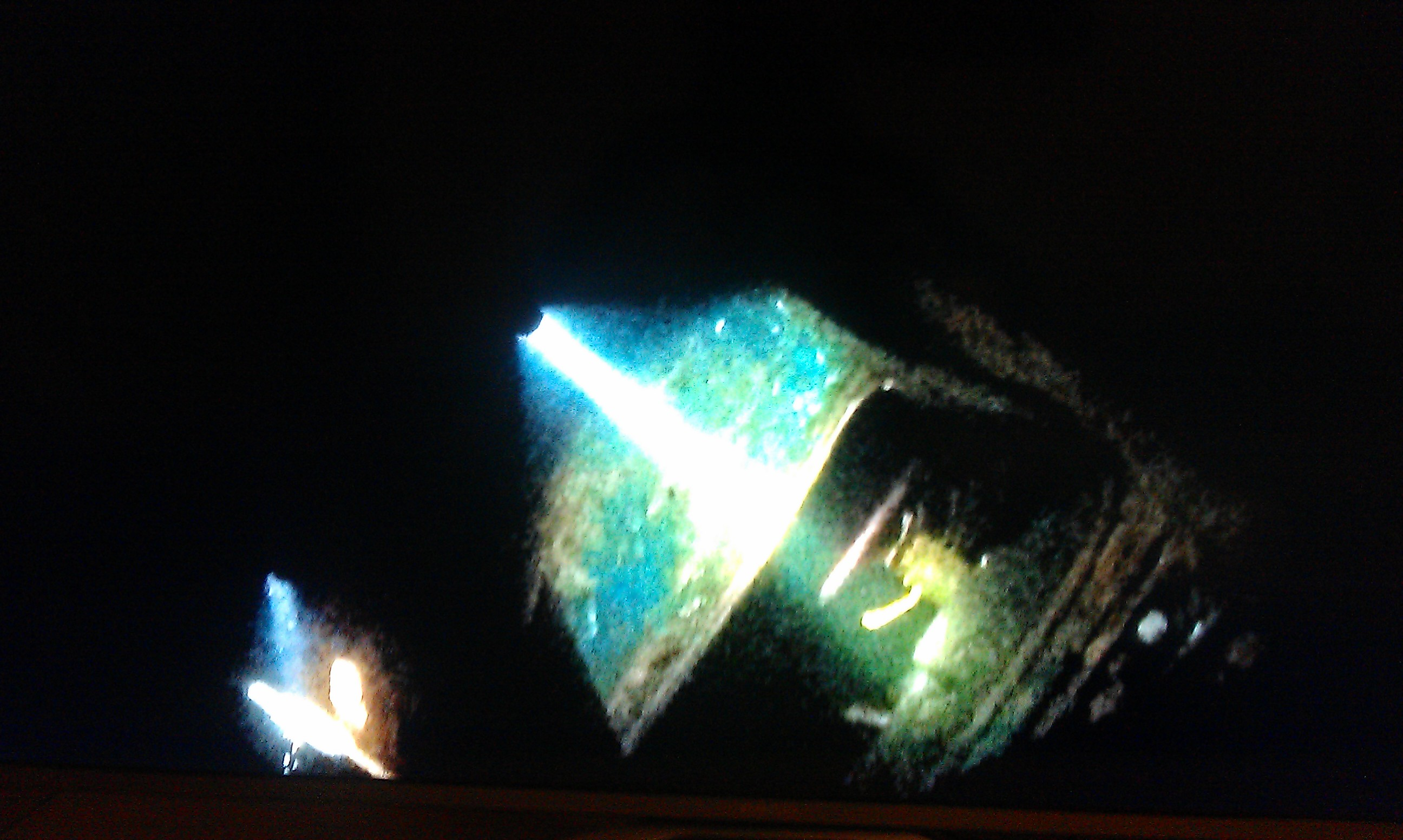
Zenobia - Captain's navy blue Lada, the only car on board circa September 2017

== Wreck diving ==
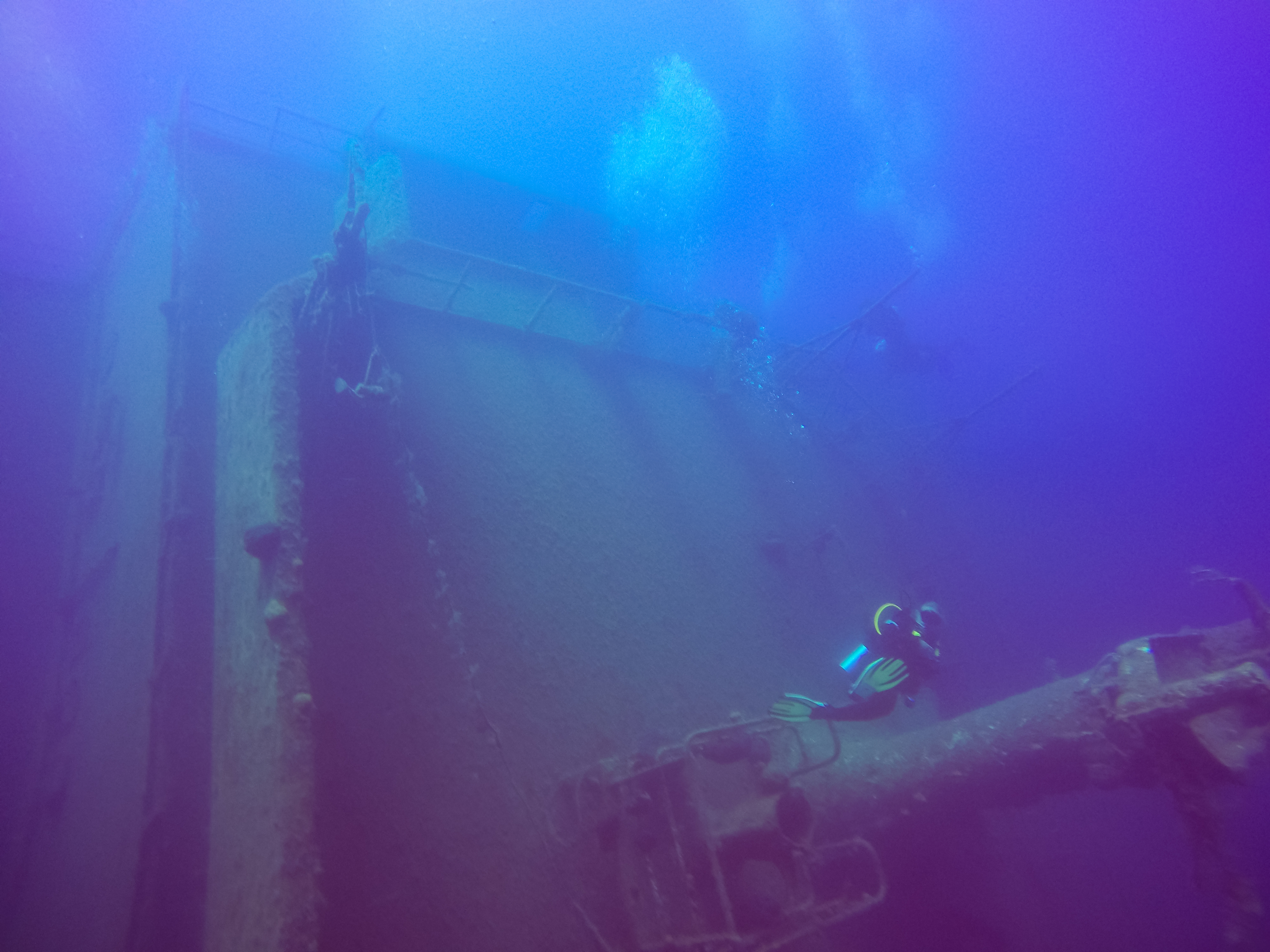
Wreck of the ship

The wreck is consistently ranked as one of the top 10 recreational dive sites worldwide. As a dive site, Zenobia provides a wide range of challenges to scuba divers, from a fairly simple dive to 16 meters (52 ft) depth along the starboard side of the ship (suitable for newly qualified divers); moving up to a more advanced dive inside the upper car deck and accommodation block, right up to extremely adventurous dives within the lower car deck or the engine room (which are only suitable for very experienced divers).
