= Côte des Flandres =

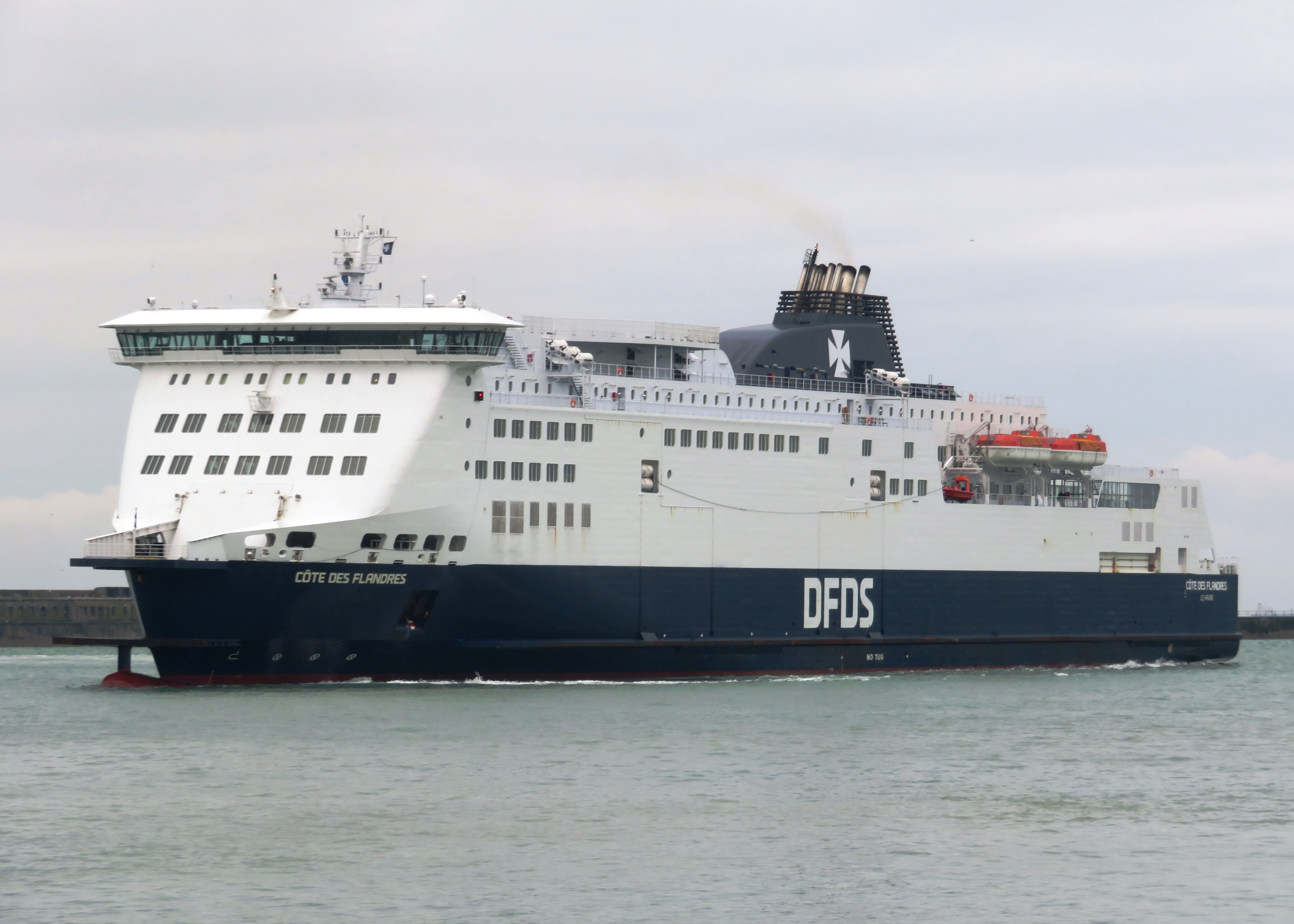
- Côte des Flandres at Dover

History
- Name: Côte des Flandres (2015-present) Berlioz (2012–2015) Seafrance Berlioz (2005–2012)
- Owner: Eurotunnel (2012-present) Seafrance (2005–2012)
- Operator: DFDS Seaways France (2016-present) MyFerryLink (2012–2015) Seafrance (2005–2012)
- Port of registry: Calais, France
- Route: Dover – Calais
- Builder: Chantiers de l'Atlantique, Saint-Nazaire
- Yard number: 032
- Launched: 14 October 2004
- In service: 30 March 2005
- Identification: IMO number: 9305843
- Status: In service

General characteristics
- Tonnage: 33,796 GT
- Length: 185.82 m (609 ft 8 in)
- Beam: 27.7 m (90 ft 11 in)
- Installed power: 2 x Wärtsilä 8L46B, 2 x Wärtsilä 12V46B diesels, 9,000 kW
- Speed: 25 knots (46 km/h)
- Capacity: 1,900 passengers, 2,000 lane metres (120 lorries or 700 cars)

Côte des Flandres is a roll-on/roll-off passenger ferry owned by Eurotunnel and operated by DFDS Seaways France between Dover and Calais, the ship was the second to be built for SeaFrance in 2005, she entered service with SeaFrance in March 2005 and finished with SeaFrance in January 2012 when the company was liquidated.

She was sold to Euro-Transmanche 3 BE (Eurotunnel) in July 2012 and was renamed Berlioz, re-entering service between Dover and Calais in August 2012 with MyFerryLink. She was further renamed Côte des Flandres for service on the Dover to Calais route with DFDS Seaways France starting in early 2016.

== Service ==
SeaFrance Berlioz carried out up to ten English Channel crossings per day with SeaFrance, initially in an advertised time of 70 minutes each. In total, there are 11 decks. When in SeaFrance service the passenger areas accounted for the upper two decks, with the lower decks used for the vehicles.

== Lay-up and incidents ==
Between 16 November 2011 and 20 August 2012 she was laid up in Calais, due to the commercial court ordering that SeaFrance be liquidated. During her time laid up in Calais, she was involved in a collision with another vessel within the port vicinity. During a gale, with winds of around 50 knots, she parted her moorings and drifted across the water towards the cable vessel Île de Batz owned by the Louis Dreyfus Group. Damage was sustained to her starboard bridge wing which resulted in shattered windows and crushed roofing. Minimal damage was caused to the Île de Batz, which later departed for a nearby port for quick repairs. A tug owned by the Port of Calais was soon on the scene to assist. She resumed service with MyFerryLink on 20 August 2012, dropping SeaFrance from her name.

On 27 October 2012 the Pride of Burgundy collided with Berlioz resulting in damage to her lifeboats, which meant the ship had to be pulled out of service. The Pride of Burgundy sustained damage to her right bridge wing which was fixed in a couple of hours. All passengers due to travel on the Berlioz were transferred to her sister-ship Rodin.

In February 2016 it entered service with DFDS Seaways France on its Dover to Calais service.

== Manoeuvrability ==
To assist in manoeuvring at port, the vessel has four transverse thrusters, three in the bow and one in the stern. The Wärtsilä thrusters are rated at 1,800 kW each. The propellers and thrusters can be controlled individually, with the aid of a joystick, or simultaneously. It can berth in wind speeds of 50 knots without tug assistance.

== Sister ship ==
- Côte des Dunes
