= Côte des Dunes =

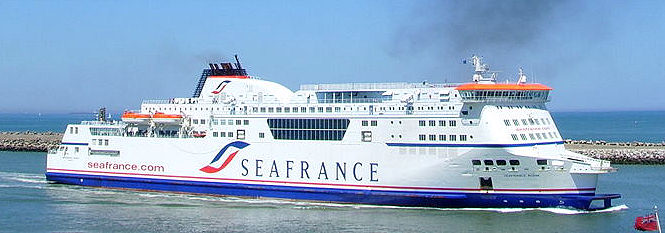
- Côte des Dunes as Seafrance Rodin entering Calais

History
- Name: Seafrance Rodin (2001–2012); Rodin (2012–2015); Côte des Dunes (2015–onwards)
- Owner: Seafrance (2001–2012); Eurotunnel (2012–present)
- Operator: Seafrance (2001–2012); MyFerryLink (2012–2015); DFDS Seaways France (2016–present)
- Port of registry: Le Havre, France (2016–present); Calais, France (2001–2016)
- Route: Dover-Calais
- Builder: Aker Finnyards in Rauma, Finland
- Yard number: 437
- Launched: 19 May 2001
- In service: 13 November 2001
- Identification: IMO number: 9232527
- Status: In service

General characteristics
- Tonnage: 33,796 GT
- Length: 185.82 m (610 ft)
- Beam: 27.7 m (91 ft)
- Installed power: 2 x Wärtsilä 8L46B; 2 x Wärtsilä 12V46B diesels
- Speed: 25 knots (46 km/h; 29 mph)
- Capacity: 1900 passengers; 2000 lane metres (120 lorries or 700 cars)

Côte des Dunes is a Rodin-class ropax ferry operated by DFDS Seaways and currently in service between Dover and Calais.

She was built in 2001 by Aker Finnyards in Rauma, Finland (Yard No.437) for SeaFrance, as a passenger and roll-on roll-off car and commercial vehicle ferry; the engines are made by Wärtsilä. SeaFrance Rodin was launched on 19 May 2001. She has a sister ship, Côte des Flandres which entered service in 2005.

On 16 November 2011, she was laid up in Calais Port, due to a Commercial Court ordering that Seafrance be liquidated. She resumed service with MyFerryLink on 20 August 2012.

On 8 June 2015, DFDS Seaways France announced it had chartered the ferry and her sister ship initially for a two-year period with an option to purchase. The vessel has been renamed Côte des Dunes for service with DFDS Seaways from early 2016. The ferry, together with her sister ship, were occupied by striking MyFerryLink workers from the end of June until the end of July. Both ships were vandalised by the staff and the whole interior was comprehensively trashed. Afterwards, the ship was towed by two tugs to Dunkirk and was put in a dry dock and refurbished, with the interior being completely rebuilt and the exterior being repainted in the DFDS livery. The vessel entered service on Dover-Calais on 9 February 2016.

== Machinery ==
The propulsion system is split into two rooms. The main engines are two Wärtsilä 12V46B units, each with an output of 11,700 kW, which are positioned forward. Two smaller Wärtsilä 8L46B units, each with a 7,800 kW output are located aft. These are combined in twin Schelde gearboxes, which each have a 4,750 kVA ABB alternator driven from the aft side. These in turn drive 5 m diameter Lips controllable pitch propellers. This arrangement gives a service speed of 25 knots at 85% MCR. Stability is afforded by a pair of ACH fin stabilizers controlled by a digital Pinfabb Stabilizers System.

Steering is carried out by twin Becker flap rudders, controlled by Porsgrunn steering gear. These rudders can be moved independently in harbour to assist the 1,800 kW Lips thruster located in the stern. There are also three 1,800 kW thrusters in the bow and four Wärtsilä 8L20 engines driving 1710 kVA ABB alternators for electricity supply.
