= Al Andalus Express =

Ferry built in 1987

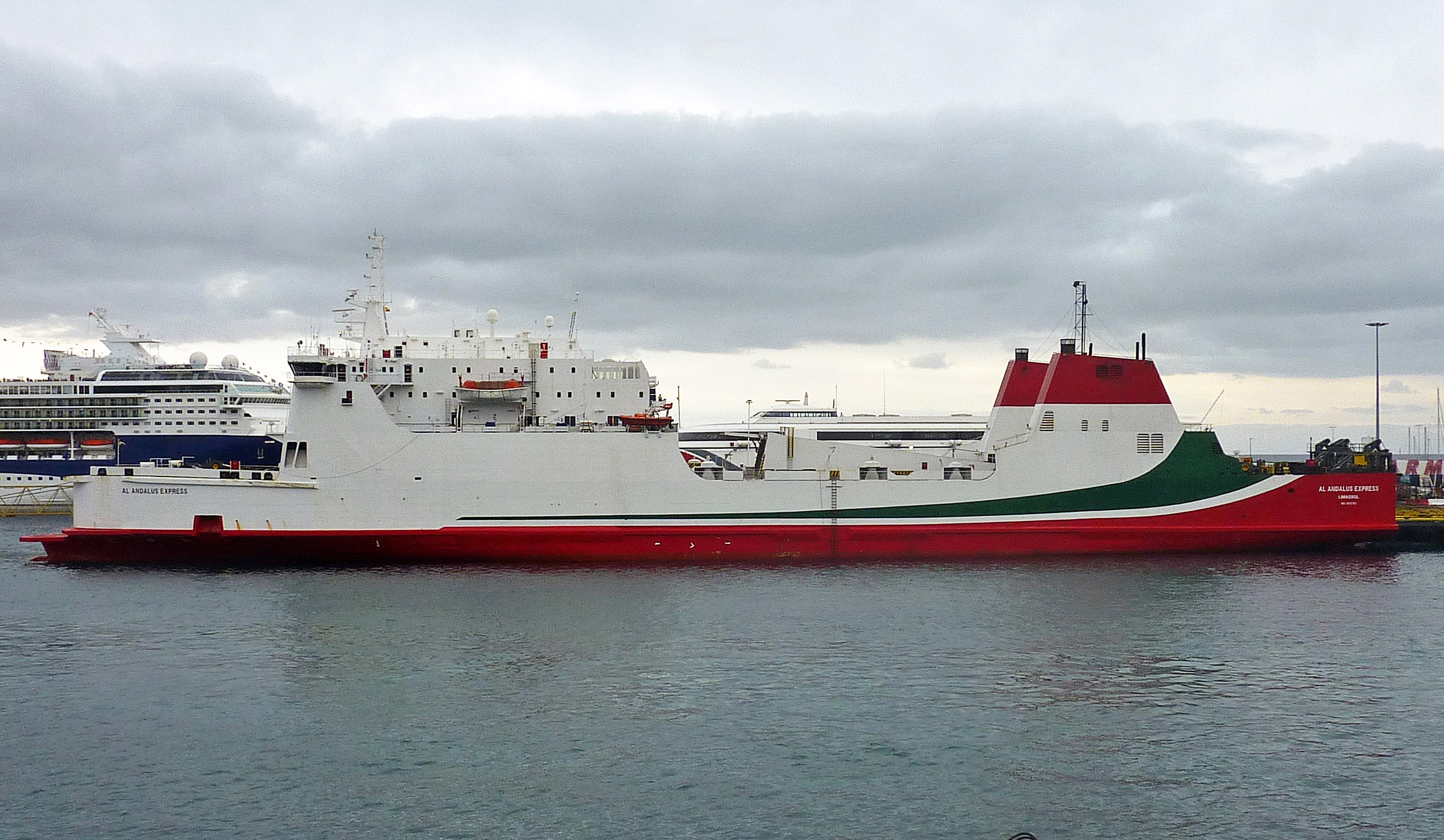
- Al Andalus Express in Santa Cruz de Tenerife

History
- Name: Nord Pas-de-Calais (1987-1996); Seafrance Nord Pas-de-Calais (1996-2012); Nord Pas-de-Calais (2012-2016); Al Andalus Express (2016-present)
- Owner: SNCF (1987-1989); SNAT (1989-1996); Seafrance (1996-2012); Eurotunnel/Getlink (2012-present)
- Operator: SNCF (1987-1989); SNAT (1989-1996); Seafrance (1996-2012); MyFerryLink (2012-2015); Eurotunnel (2015-2016); FRS Iberia/Maroc (2016-2018; 2020); Naviera Armas (2018 - 2026); Balearia Canarias (2026-present)
- Port of registry: Limassol; Cyprus
- Route: Dover – Dunkirk; Dover – Calais; Motril – Tangier; Las Palmas – Gran Canaria
- Ordered: 17 July 1985
- Builder: Normed, Dunkirk, France
- Yard number: 325
- Laid down: 1987
- Launched: 15 April 1987
- In service: 12 December 1987
- Identification: IMO number: 8512152
- Status: Active

General characteristics
- Tonnage: 13,727 GT
- Length: 158.09 m (518.7 ft)
- Beam: 22.4 m (73.5 ft)
- Draught: 5.92 m (19.4 ft)
- Propulsion: 2 x Sulzer 16ZAV40
- Speed: 21.5 knots (39.8 km/h; 24.7 mph)
- Capacity: 80 passengers, 45 lorries and 600 metres of rail freight or 90 lorries

Al Andalus Express (formerly Nord Pas-de-Calais) is a freight ferry owned by Getlink and operated by Naviera Armas. She was built in 1987 by Chantiers du Nord et de la Mediterranee, Dunkirk (Yard No 325) for SNCF as a multi-purpose passenger and roll-on roll-off ferry for lorries and railway vehicles. After the introduction of Eurotunnel there was no need for a train ferry, so SNCF was losing money running her.

She was acquired by SNAT] and Stena Sealink in 1989, which operated the Nord Pas-de-Calais until 31 December 1995. From 1 January 1996 SNAT operated as SeaFrance. The vessel was renamed SeaFrance Nord Pas-de-Calais. SeaFrance operated until November 2011, and was liquidated on 9 January 2012. Eurotunnel won the bid for the three of the former SeaFrance vessels the original name of the vessel was restored, dropping the SeaFrance prefix. MyFerryLink started running on 20 August 2012, although Nord Pas-de-Calais joined in November 2012 following a refit. Following MyFerryLink's cessation of operations, mostly cited due to financial issues, the ferry was used directly by Eurotunnel to carry hazmat cargoes that are not allowed on regular train services.

== Service history ==
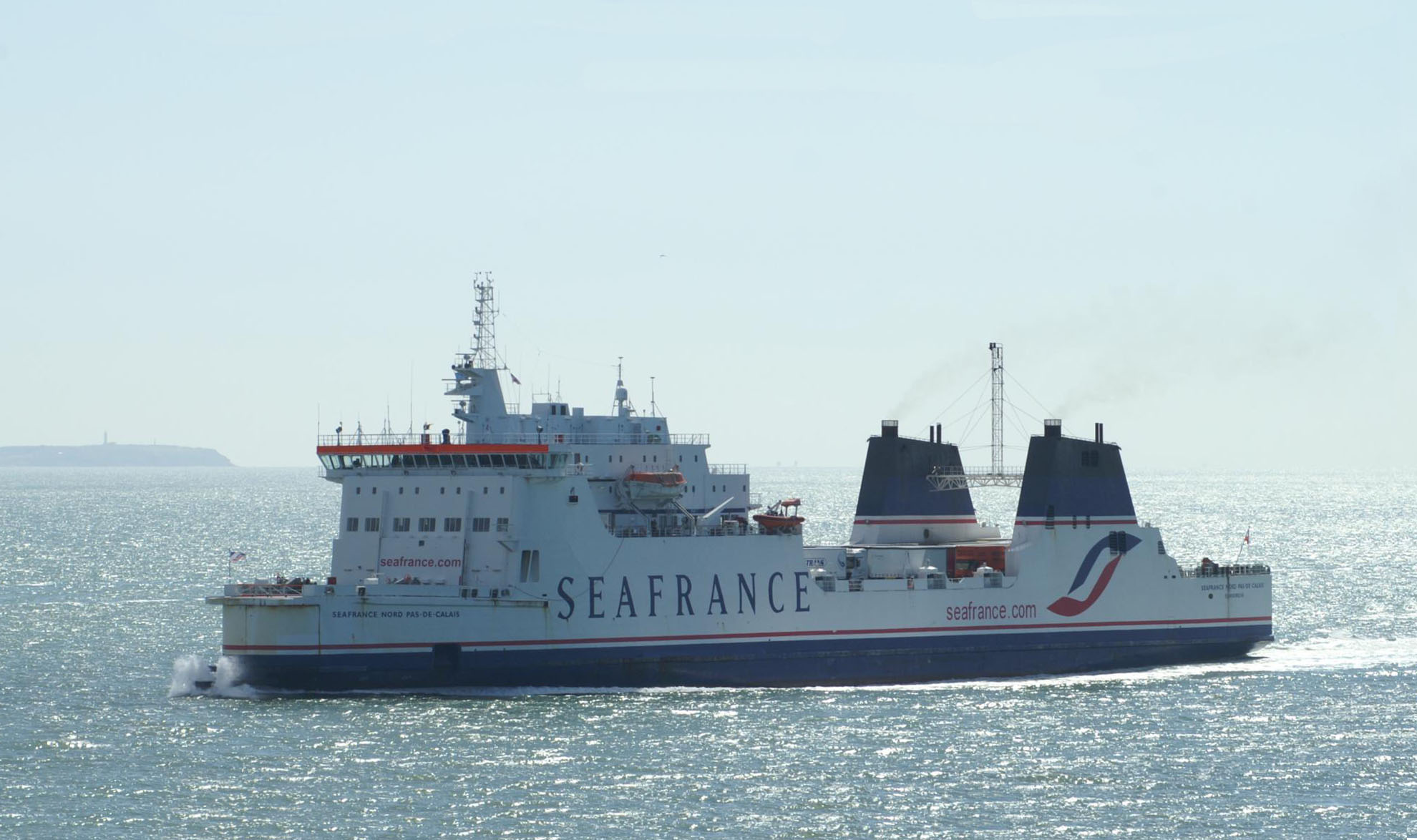
SeaFrance Nord Pas-de-Calais at sea

Nord Pas-de-Calais was built in 1987 by Chantiers du Nord et de la Mediterranee, Dunkerque for SNCF as a train ferry. She operated on the Dover-Dunkerque train ferry route; in addition, she also worked as a freight vehicle ferry between Dover and Calais. Nord Pas-de-Calais had limited accommodation for 80 passengers. She stopped running as a train ferry because of low traffic due to the opening of the Channel Tunnel which offered a much quicker option for trains to cross the border. The last sailing was from Dover on 22 December 1995. The Nord Pas-de-Calais ran in a joint operation with SNAT and Stena Sealink.

She was given TOPS number 99001, previously used by Suffolk Ferry.

=== SNAT ===
In 1989, ownership was changed to SNAT. On 12 July 1995 it was announced that the agreement between Stena Sealink Line and French partners SNAT would terminate on 31 December 1995. From that time onwards SNAT would trade as SeaFrance.

=== SeaFrance ===
In 1996, Nord Pas-de-Calais was renamed SeaFrance Nord Pas-de-Calais, operating for SeaFrance as a vehicle ferry between Dover and Calais. On 3 July 1996, she was laid up at Dunkerque and remained there until 29 November when she was introduced as an ordinary freight vessel between Calais and Dover.

In November 2011, she was laid up in Dunkirk, due to the commercial court ordering that SeaFrance be liquidated.

=== Eurotunnel/MyFerryLink ===
On 20 August 2012 after Seafrance was liquidated MyFerryLink began commercial service. The SeaFrance Nord Pas-de-Calais was renamed Nord Pas-de-Calais. She started service with MyFerryLink under the ownership of Eurotunnel in November 2012, after a full refit.

=== FRS Iberia ===
Renamed Al Andalus Express and registered under the Cypriot flag,she was chartered from Eurotunnel by FRS Iberia, and entered dry dock in Campamento, near Algeciras for refit. She currently operates between Spain and Morocco.

=== Seaborne Freight ===
In October 2017 the ship was said by Ferry Shipping News to be lined up for use by Seaborne Freight for a freight service from Ramsgate to Ostend from "March" but it was not specified in which year and was not confirmed by Seaborne. Seaborne had been contracted by the British government to provide additional ferry capacity in the event of disruption caused by a no-deal Brexit and the ship is one of the few small enough to fit Ramsgate's restricted docks. However, at the beginning of February the British government announced that it was cancelling the contract as Seaborne's backers, the Irish company Arklow Shipping, had withdrawn from the agreement.
