= SeaFrance =

Defunct French ferry company

- SeaFrance Logo (1996–2012)
- Type: Limited
- Genre: Ferry company
- Founded: 1996
- Founder: SNCF
- Defunct: 9 January 2012
- Fate: Liquidation
- Successor: MyFerryLink (Eurotunnel)
- Headquarters: Paris, France
- Area served: United Kingdom, France, English Channel, Dover, Calais
- Services: Passenger transportation, freight transportation
- Owner: SNCF
- Website: seafrance.com

SeaFrance was a ferry company based in France, wholly owned by the French railways, SNCF, which operated ferry services between Calais, France, and Dover, England.

The company employed a total of 1,850 staff, including 1,300 seagoing personnel, and was the largest employer in the town of Calais. Its sister company, SeaFrance Limited, employed 200 in England. On 9 January 2012 the Commercial Court in Paris announced their decision to liquidate SeaFrance. From then on the company was prohibited from trading, with the loss of 1,850 jobs.

== History ==
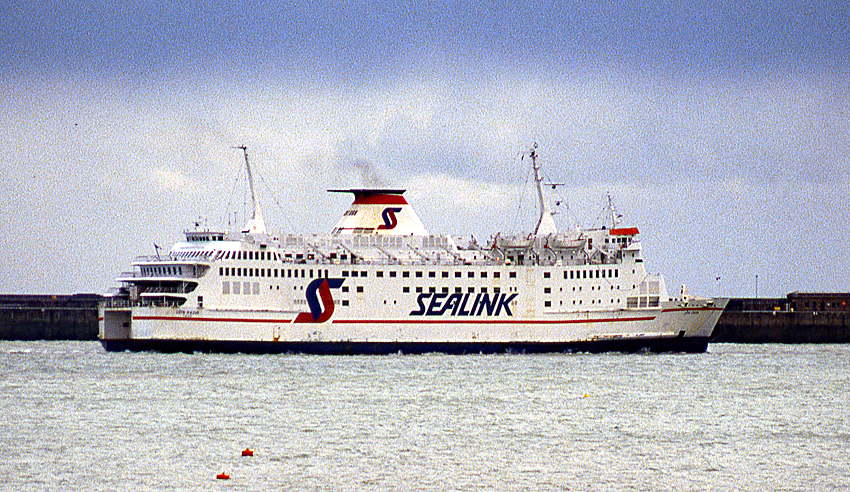
Côte d'Azur Sealink ferry departing from Dover in 1991

SeaFrance began operations between Dover and Calais in 1996 after the termination of a pooling agreement with Sealink (by then known as Stena Sealink Line) in 1995. The service initially began with the former Sealink vessels Fiesta and Côte d'Azur which became SeaFrance Cézanne and SeaFrance Renoir respectively after extensive refurbishments to create a distinctive French atmosphere on board. The company then acquired the MS Nord Pas-de-Calais from former Sealink railway ferry services and operated it as a freight only ferry, though SeaFrance did market the ship to passengers as a quiet ship. The three vessels were later joined by the former Stena Londoner which became the SeaFrance Monet. SeaFrance quickly became the second busiest operator on the Dover-Calais route after P&O European Ferries and ahead of their former partners now known as Stena Line. In 1997 the SeaFrance Manet entered service after a five-year charter to Stena Line for the Newhaven—Dieppe service, the ship essentially replaced the Monet which was later sold, after being damaged in Calais. SeaFrance took delivery of the SeaFrance Rodin in 2001, their first new ship and the fastest Dover—Calais ferry. She was joined in 2005 by the SeaFrance Berlioz, a sister ship built at a different yard.

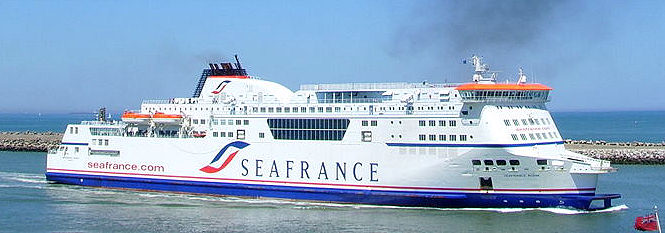
SeaFrance Rodin (now MS Côte des Dunes) in the port of Calais, July 2008

SeaFrance was one of five companies invited to tender for the operation of the Transmanche Ferries service between Dieppe and Newhaven. The SNCF and later SNAT operated the route until 1992, when they withdrew after poor performance due to almost constant strike action. The route later passed to Sealink Stena Line (later renamed Stena Sealink Line and finally Stena Line). The route became part of P&O Stena Line with the merger of the company's Eastern Channel services and they operated the route until 1998, after which Hoverspeed operated a fast-ferry service on the route until 2004. Because the French local government did not want the route to be lost, they started a subsidized line called Transmanche Ferries in April 2001. After five years of service and the arrival of two new-build ships, the government had to tender the line in a concession to comply with European Union regulations. The contract to operate the service was awarded to LD Lines on 21 December 2006.

In 2008, SeaFrance introduced the SeaFrance Molière, withdrew the SeaFrance Manet, and subsequently withdrew the SeaFrance Renoir.

== Restructuring ==
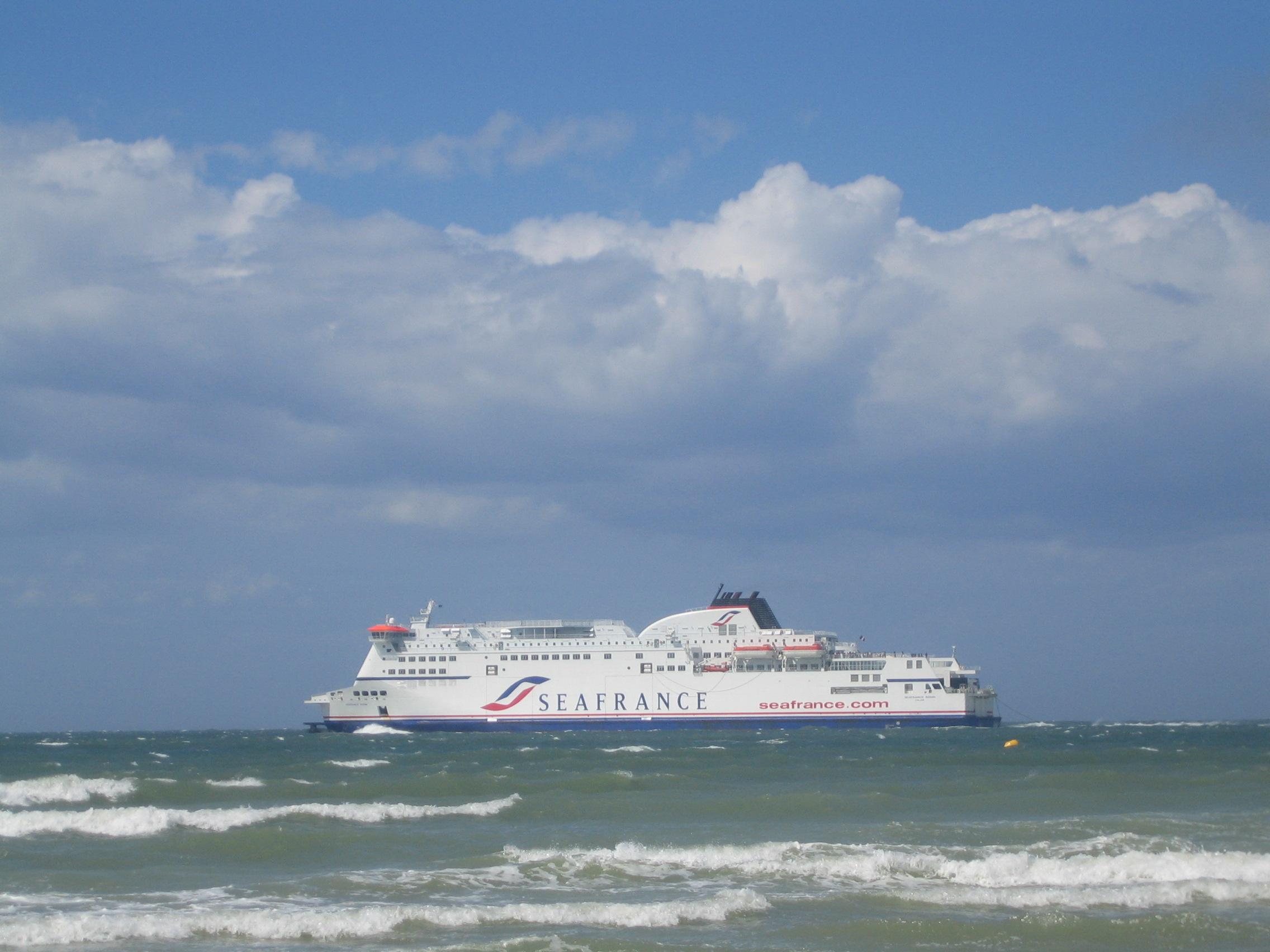
The SeaFrance Berlioz in Calais.

In 2005, SeaFrance made a €9.27 million loss, but made a net profit of €7.9 million in 2006. In 2008, the company lost €20 million and since October 2008 had been losing in the region of €3 million a month.

On 17 February 2009, SeaFrance announced a restructuring plan following a decline in its freight carryings and significant losses. The restructuring would see up to 650 jobs lost in France and the withdrawal of the SeaFrance Cézanne, SeaFrance Nord Pas-de-Calais and SeaFrance Renoir. A previous restructuring plan by SeaFrance submitted in January 2009 was rejected by owners SNCF. Following the restructuring announcement LD Lines indicated they would be interested in taking over SeaFrance. On 16 March 2009, Brittany Ferries announced it had also made an offer for SeaFrance. The Brittany Ferries offer involved the creation of a new holding company in which Brittany Ferries would have a 75% stake with the remainder being owned by SNCF. In September 2010 the CFDT union rejected a plan for 400 redundancies as part of restructuring.

On 15 November 2011, the company suspended operations for 48 hours pending a court hearing the following day. At the hearing on 16 November, the commercial court ordered the liquidation of SeaFrance, but allowed the ferry operator to continue trading until 28 January 2012. However, actual ferry operations were shut down, with the administrators claiming that the safety of vessels, staff and property could not be guaranteed. The union argued that the shutdown was an illegal lock-out and was ruining SeaFrance's core business, with customers switching to competitors, and suggested it was part of a move by management to sabotage a takeover by a co-operative of SeaFrance workers ("SCOP"). On 19 December 2011, the commercial court in Paris postponed its decision on the takeover bid for SeaFrance submitted by the co-operative until 3 January. The main staff union, the CFDT, was back in Paris the following day, to hear the appeal court's verdict on its request that SeaFrance's ferries be allowed to return to service. "The judicial administrators withdrew their request that SeaFrance be liquidated with immediate effect and this was good news", said a senior official of the CFDT. "We are now demanding that the government, via [its parent company] SNCF, become a shareholder in the new SeaFrance company and thus allow us to save 1,000 jobs", he added. The co-operative's bid had attracted promises of funding from local authorities of less than €15 million out of the estimated €25-30 million required.

== Liquidation ==
On 9 January 2012 a court ruled that additional subsidies would have been illegal, ruling out the union's proposal, and SeaFrance was officially liquidated. The court invited offers for the enterprise and its assets by 10 May. Three were submitted:

- Eurotunnel offered €65 million for the whole real and intangible assets of SeaFrance
- Louis Dreyfus Group-DFDS consortium offered €50 million for the Berlioz and Rodin (and €30/€25 million respectively for just one vessel)
- Stena Line offered €30 million for the Rodin.

The four ships that SeaFrance operated when the company went into liquidation were:

- SeaFrance Rodin
- SeaFrance Berlioz
- SeaFrance Nord Pas-de-Calais
- SeaFrance Molière

SeaFrance Rodin and SeaFrance Berlioz were docked in Calais, and SeaFrance Molière and SeaFrance Nord Pas-de-Calais in Dunkerque, awaiting decisions on their futures. On 11 June 2012 a bid by Eurotunnel for the Rodin, Berlioz and Pas-de-Calais for lease to another operator was accepted. Until June 2015 Eurotunnel leased the acquired vessels to a new company, "MyFerryLink", essentially a workers' co-operative of former Seafrance employees. The new company started operations on the Dover - Calais route on 20 August 2012, using "Rodin" and "Berlioz" and ceased operation on 2 July 2015, as a result of action by the UK Competition and Markets Authority. Nord pas de Calais was supposed to join the fleet at a later date. The SeaFrance Molière is now operated by DFDS Seaways as Dieppe Seaways.

== Former fleet ==
Ship	Built	In Service	Left Service	Future
Seafrance Rodin	2001	2001	2012	Operated by MyFerryLink between 2012 and 2015, then chartered to DFDS Seaways France from July 2015.
Seafrance Berlioz	2005	2005	2012	Operated by MyFerryLink between 2012 and 2015, then chartered to DFDS Seaways France from July 2015.
Seafrance Nord Pas-de-Calais	1987	1996	2012	Operated by MyFerryLink between 2012 and 2015, then retained by Eurotunnel in July 2015 to carry hazardous freight that the tunnel cannot take.
SeaFrance Cézanne	1980/1990	1996	2009	Sold for scrap to Belize interests, beached in Alang, India in 2011.
SeaFrance Manet	1984	1996	2009	Sold to Stena Line in 2009 for service between Stranraer-Belfast as Stena Navigator, then sold to Balearia in 2011 and renamed Daniya from 2011 until 2013 when she was renamed Poeta Lopez Anglada.
SeaFrance Molière	2002	2008	2012	Sold to Scapino Shipping in 2012 and renamed Molière, chartered to DFDS Seaways France in November 2012 and renamed Dieppe Seaways and kept on the Dover-Calais route, then sold to Stena Line in May 2014 and entered service for Stena Line between Holyhead-Dublin from March 2015 as Stena Superfast X.
SeaFrance Monet	1973	1996	2000	Sold to Naviera Armas in 2000 and renamed Volcan de Tacande, but sank in 2005 and was scrapped in 2005 in Turkey.
SeaFrance Renoir	1981	1996	2009	Originally SNCF's Côte d'Azur, sold to Belize Interests, renamed Eastern Light in 2011 and was beached in Alang, India along with her fleetmate SeaFrance Cézanne.
