= MV Volcan de Tacande =

Ferry

History
- Name: 1973–1974: Stena Nordica; 1974–1981: Stena Danica; 1981–1984: Stena Nordica; 1984–1987: Stena Nautica; 1987–1992: Versailles; 1992–1996: Stena Londoner; 1996–2000: SeaFrance Monet; 2000-2005: Volcán de Tacande
- Owner: 1973–1987: Stena; 1987–1996: SNCF; 1996–2000: SeaFrance; 2000-2005: Naviera Armas
- Builder: Brodogradiliste Jozo Lozovina Mosor, Trogir, Yugoslavia
- Yard number: 163
- Launched: 17 June 1973
- Identification: IMO number: 7321661
- Fate: Scrapped.

General characteristics
- Tonnage: 6,333 GT
- Length: 124.85 m (410 ft)
- Beam: 21.87 m (72 ft)
- Installed power: 12,310 kW
- Propulsion: Two Lindhomen/Pielstick 18PC2V diesels
- Speed: 22 kn (40.74 km/h)
- Capacity: 1,800 passengers, 425 cars (1974), 450 (1977)

MV Volcán de Tacande was a ferry last owned by Naviera Armas, which was operated on routes around the Canary Islands. She was built by Brodogradiliste Jozo Lozovina Mosor, Togir, Yugoslavia in 1974 (Yard No. 163) for Stena Ab, Göteborg as a roll-on roll-off car and commercial vehicle ferry, under the name Stena Nordica. It was launched on 17 June 1973.

From 1996 to 2000, she was owned by SeaFrance under the name SeaFrance Monet.

== Service history ==
=== Stena ===
Stena Nordica, a steel twin screw motor vessel, was built by Brodogradiliste Jozo Lozovina Mosor in Togir, Yugoslavia, in 1974 (Yard No. 163) for Stena Ab, Göteborg as a roll-on roll-off car and commercial vehicle ferry, which was launched 17 June 1973. On 2 June 1974, the Stena Nordica was renamed Stena Danica, which was then renamed back to Stena Nordica in December 1981. On 2 May 1983, the Stena Nordica arrived at a builders' yard in Antwerp for conversion to a new role. Among things done was the moving of loading doors from port side to starboard side.

On 10 June 1983, the ship was taken over by Nautica (Belgien) N.V. Ostend, Belgium, and by 16 June commenced service between Ostend and Dover. In August 1983, the ferry suffered complete engine failure and had to be withdrawn for repairs, which lasted over a week. In March 1984, the ferry underwent another renaming, to the Stena Nautica.

=== SNCF ===
In late spring 1986, SNCF formed a subsidiary company, Dieppe Ferries, to manage the future of its Newhaven service. The Stena Nautica was now chartered to SNCF in Dieppe, France, and was renamed to Versailles. It was simultaneously transferred to the French flag and commenced service between Newhaven and Dieppe.

On 22 January 1990, SNCF Versailles became registered to Societé Propietaire des Navaires (SPN), Paris, France, at the same time as SNCF sold 49% of the ferry operations to Stena Sealink Line UK, London, England. Sealink Dieppe Ferries was known as Sealink SNAT and operated in a new livery. Following months of industrial unrest, Sealink SNAT announced that the Newhaven to Dieppe route was to be closed or sold off. Following this announcement, the crew on this route immediately went on strike. By April 1993, it was announced that the Newhaven to Dieppe route had been purchased by Sealink Stena Line, Ashford, England. The ferry was then rebuilt at A,&P. Appledore, Southampton, England. By 22 May 1992, the ship, now named Stena Londoner, commenced service between Newhaven and Dieppe.

The agreement between Stena Sealink Line and its French partners SNAT terminated from 31 December 1995. From that time onwards, SNAT traded as SeaFrance. 3 March 1996 was the final day between Newhaven and Dieppe.

=== SeaFrance ===
In June 1996, the Stena Londoner was renamed SeaFrance Monet, registered to G.I.E. Versabil, Calais, France. It underwent a rebuild in Dunkerque and by 3 July 1996 it commenced service between Calais and Dover. After 7 December 1997, during operation between Calais and Dover, the SeaFrance Monet was laid up in Dunkerque. Subsequently, in May 1998, she was laid up in Le Havre. On 29 March 2000, Monet collided with a pier in Calais, during stormy weather, and sustained stabiliser damage. She was sold to Naviera Armas S.A., Las Palmas de Gran Canaria, Spain, in a broken down condition on 18 May 2000. On 24 May, Mone was towed from Dunkerque to Vigo, Spain, for engine repairs, arriving on 30 May 2000.

=== Naviera Armas ===
On 11 September 2000, the SeaFrance Monet was renamed Volcán de Tacande and commenced service with Armas around the Canary Islands. Services included Los Cristianos – San Sebastián de la Gomera – La Estaca. On a voyage from Los Cristianos to San Sebastián de La Gomera, on 30 January 2005, the vessel lost all power due to a flooded engine room. All passengers had to be evacuated. Eventually, the vessel was towed to Puerto de Las Palmas where she was later declared a total loss.

In May 2005, she was sold for breaking and in June 2005, she arrived in Turkey for scrapping.
