= DFDS Seaways France =

French ferry company servicing travel across the English channel

DFDS Seaways
- Founded: 2012
- Headquarters: Dunkirk, France
- Area served: English Channel
- Services: Passenger transportation Freight transportation
- Owner: DFDS
- Parent: DFDS Seaways

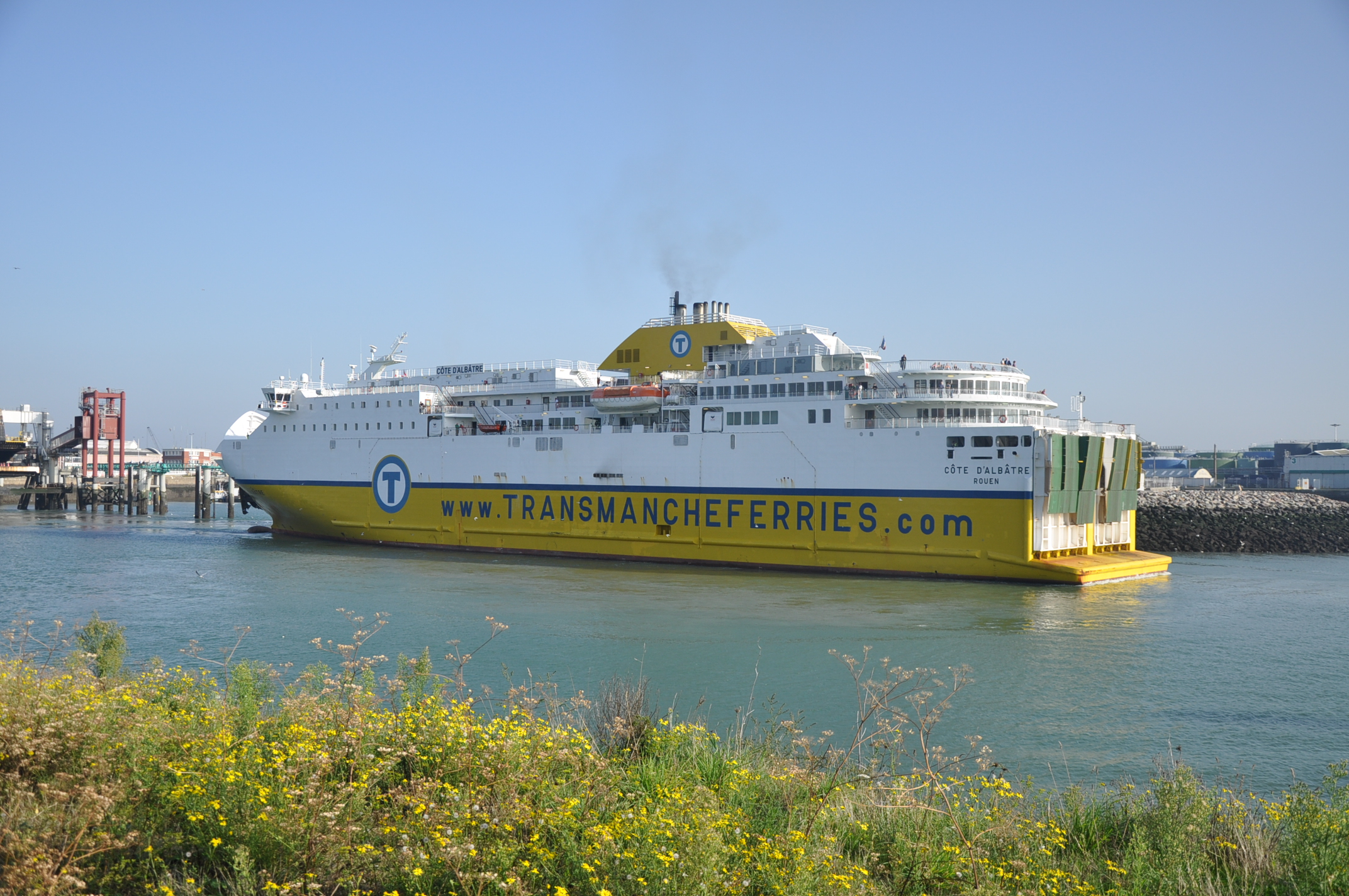
Côte d'Albâtre in Le Havre

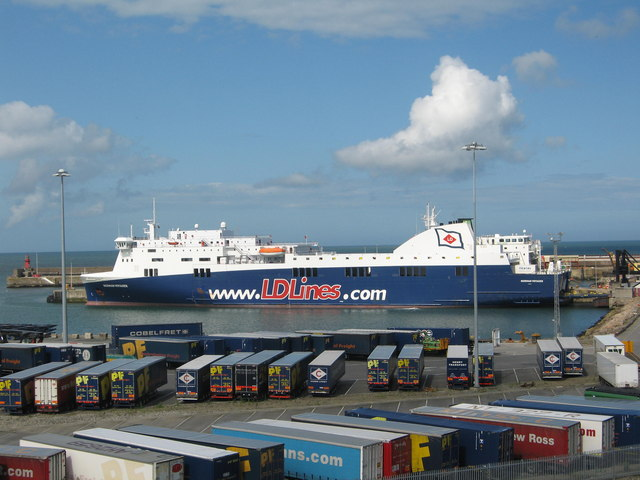
A former ferry, shown as M/S Norman Voyager now Brittany Ferries M/S Etretat

DFDS Seaways France, trading as DFDS Seaways, and formerly known as New Channel Company A/S, is the trading name of the ferry services across the Dover Strait and English Channel operated by DFDS Seaways and formerly operated by LD Lines. Travel time is around 90 minutes.

== History ==
In 2012, when SeaFrance was liquidated, DFDS and LD Lines started a joint service between Dover and Calais and formed New Channel Company A/S or DFDS Seaways France by merging certain LD Lines and DFDS routes into the new company such as LD Lines Portsmouth to Le Havre and Newhaven to Dieppe services and DFDS Dover to Dunkirk services but also along with the joint Dover- Calais service.

In June 2015, DFDS chartered the MyFerryLink/Eurotunnel ferries MS Rodin & MS Berlioz to enter service on 2 July 2015 when the MyFerryLink Dover-Calais ceased service. DFDS planned to keep 202 of the 600 French jobs currently employed by SCOP Seafrance, but in reaction to this decision, the French crew struck in Calais on 29 June 2015 and later occupied the two passenger vessels in Calais and started to vandalise the vessels. This delayed their re-entry into Dover-Calais service. Meanwhile, MS Calais Seaways was diverted and placed on Dover-Dunkirk service and MS Malo Seaways was laid up in Dover from 29 June. On 13 September, both vessels were tugged to Dunkirk for refit and repaint, which showed the start of DFDS ownership of the vessels, which have subsequently been renamed Côte des Dunes and Côte des Flandres.

In October 2014, DFDS extended its operation contract for the Newhaven-Dieppe service with Syndicat Mixte de Promotion de L'Activité Transmanche (SMPAT), for a further year to secure the service, and was further extended in May 2016 for four years until May 2020.

On 31 December 2014, DFDS closed the Portsmouth-Le Havre service due to continued losses on the service, following its acquisition from LD Lines and also following Brittany Ferries introduction of its Economie service to Le Havre. The sole vessel, MS Seven Sisters was moved to lay up in Dunkirk before being introduced during the summer of 2015 full-time on the Newhaven-Dieppe service.

As of August 2017, DFDS Seaways currently operates between Dover and Calais/Dunkirk and also Newhaven and Dieppe.

=== Controversy ===
In November 2025, DFDS issued a public apology when a pornographic film was played on one of its ships from France to Sussex. DFDS said it was “very sorry” over the incident. It said that an “adult film” was broadcast mistakenly on the lounge television to passengers who had been watching a Formula One grand prix, causing children onboard to be exposed to the content.

== Fleet ==
Ship	Built	Route	Notes
Cote D'Albatre	2006	Newhaven-Dieppe	In Service
Seven Sisters	2006	Newhaven-Dieppe	In Service
Côte des Dunes	2001	Dover-Calais	In Service (formerly Rodin, ex MyFerryLink and SeaFrance).
Côte des Flandres	2005	Dover-Calais	In Service (formerly Berlioz, ex MyFerryLink and SeaFrance).
Dover Seaways	2006	Dover-Dunkirk	In Service
Dunkerque Seaways	2005	Dover-Dunkirk	In Service
Delft Seaways	2006	Dover-Dunkirk	In Service
Côte d'Opale	2021	Dover-Calais	In service

== Former fleet ==
Ship	Built	Left DFDS Service	Current Status
Norman Voyager	2008	2014	Now with Brittany Ferries as Étretat
Dieppe Seaways	2002	2014	Now with Corsica Linea as A. Nepita
Deal Seaways	1992	2012	Renamed Barfleur and returned to Brittany Ferries
Malo Seaways	2000	2016	with Stena Line
Calais Seaways	1991	2021	Now with Irish Ferries as MS Isle of Innisfree (1991)
