= MyFerryLink =

English channel ferry company

- Industry: auxiliary services for water transport
- Genre: Ferry company
- Predecessor: SeaFrance
- Founded: 2012
- Founder: Eurotunnel & Scop SeaFrance
- Defunct: 1 July 2015
- Fate: Service discontinued. Eurotunnel leased MS Rodin and MS Berlioz to DFDS Seaways
- Headquarters: Dover, England.
- Area served: United Kingdom, France, English Channel, Dover, Calais
- Services: Passenger transportation, freight transportation
- Website: www.myferrylink.com

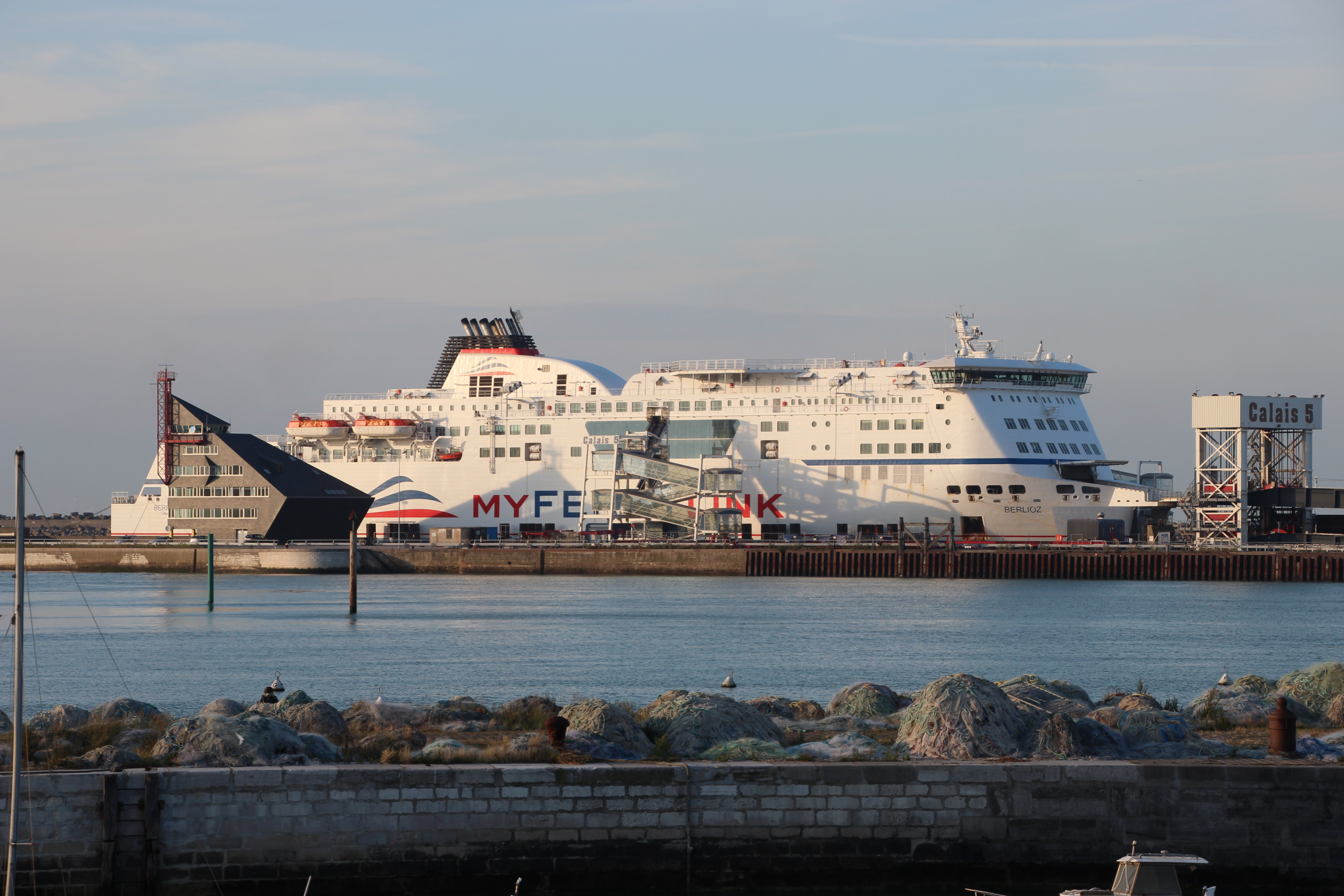
Berlioz at the Port of Calais in August 2012

MyFerryLink was an English Channel passenger and freight ferry company.

== History ==
MyFerryLink began operating between Dover and Calais in August 2012. The fleet consisted of two modern ferries, the MS Rodin and the MS Berlioz, that carried passengers and freight, and one dedicated freight ship, the MS Nord Pas-de-Calais. It was formed following the liquidation of SeaFrance. MyFerryLink offered passengers up to sixteen sailings between Dover and Calais every day, and additional services for freight.

The ships were leased to a workers' co-operative, Scop SeaFrance, that operated the company's sailings between Britain and France and employed all the on-board staff. It was a société coopérative et participative, (in French) or SCOP.

On 6 June 2013, the Competition Commission ruled that Eurotunnel, which leased the three MyFerryLink vessels to the SCOP, could no longer operate ferry services from Dover, due to the proportion of the cross-Channel market that they held as a result. The ruling was appealed by Eurotunnel, allowing sailings operated by the company to continue as normal.

On 20 May 2014, the Competition & Markets Authority (CMA) that had succeeded the Competition Commission, ruled that the SCOP could no longer operate ferry services from Dover. Scop SeaFrance pointed out a potential conflict of interest: an ex accountant of DFDS was now a member of UK Competition Commission, and appealed.

On 15 May 2015 the Court of Appeal overturned the CMA ruling, on the grounds of "fair competition", but the CMA then lodged an appeal to the UK Supreme Court.

On 8 June 2015, Eurotunnel tired of the continuous fight, their lease of the ships to Scop SeaFrance was due to end on 1 July 2015, and they announced they would not extend it, and instead had entered a lease-buy deal for DFDS to acquire the ships Rodin and Berlioz. Eurotunnel will keep operating Nord Pas-de-Calais for dangerous goods.

MyFerryLink workers went on strike on 1 July 2015 in protest against expected job losses. MyFerryLink services ceased at midnight on 1/2 July. On 15 July MyFerryLink workers occupied both MS Rodin and MS Berlioz in the Port of Calais and began sabotaging the ships in protest of their impending lease-buy to DFDS. DFDS ships were also refused entry by dockers to the Port of Calais and were only able to operate their Dover/Dunkerque route, causing major congestion on both sides of the channel, with Operation Stack still in place on the UK side. DFDS staff reported that the MyFerryLink workers had reportedly destroyed safety and alarm systems on the ships and activated flotation and life-saving equipment, so as to make the ships unusable.

== Former fleet ==
Ship	Built	In Service	Left Service	Notes
Rodin	2001	2012	2015	Formerly Seafrance Rodin between 2001 and 2012 for SeaFrance, chartered to DFDS Seaways France from July 2015.
Berlioz	2005	2012	2015	Formerly Seafrance Berlioz between 2005 and 2012 for SeaFrance, chartered to DFDS Seaways France from July 2015.
Nord Pas-de-Calais	1987	2012	2015	Formerly Nord Pas-de-Calais with SNAT-Sealink until 1996 then SeaFrance Nord Pas-de-Calais for SeaFrance between 1996 and 2012, retained by Eurotunnel for use to transport hazardous freight for Eurotunnel that the tunnel cannot take.
