= Île Rouge =

Ropax ferry built in 2002

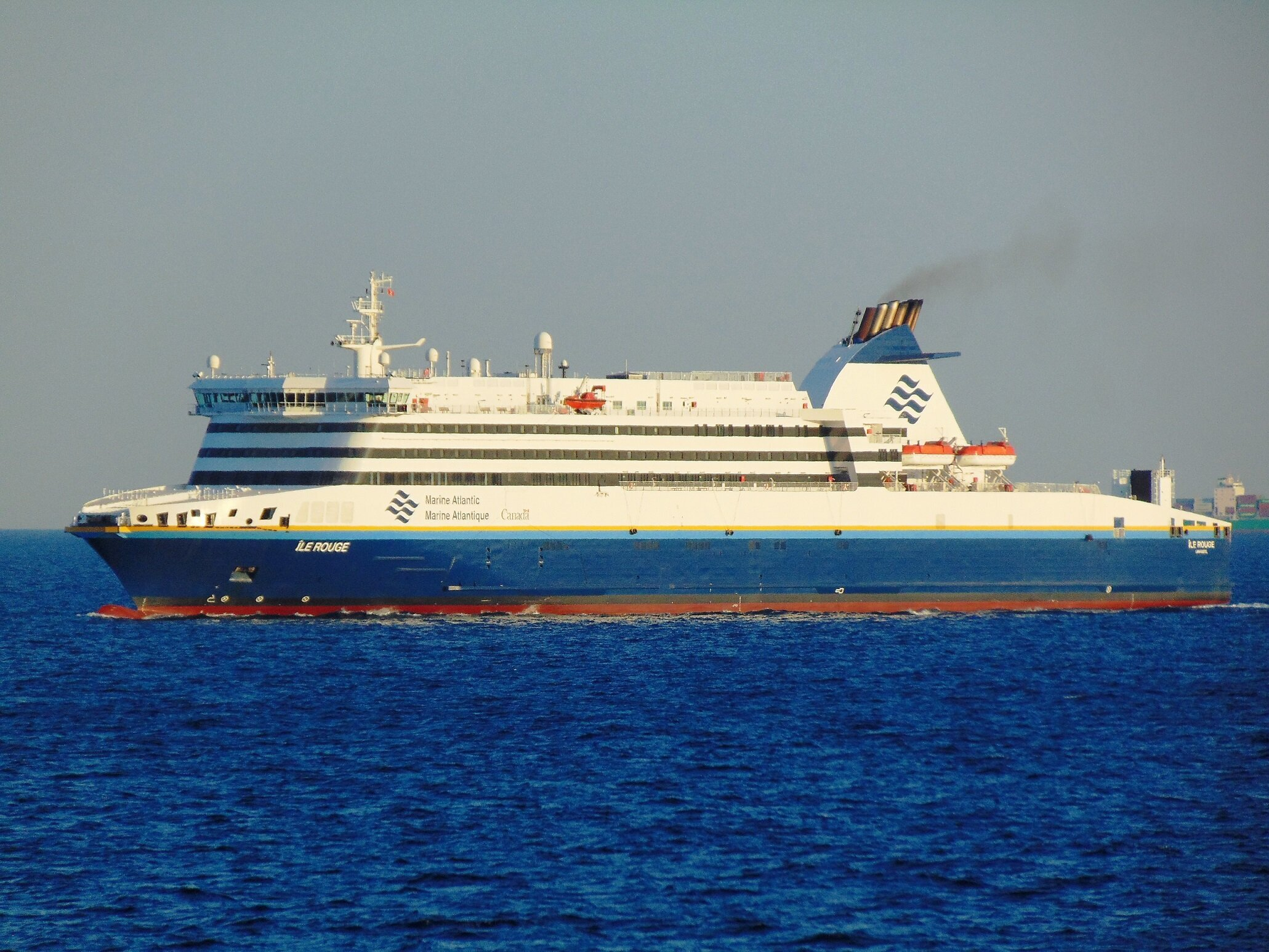
- Île Rouge off Piraeus

History
- Name: 2002–07: Superfast X; 2007–08: Jean Nicoli; 2008–12: SeaFrance Molière; 2012: Molière; 2012–14: Dieppe Seaways; 2014–2020: Stena Superfast X; 2020-2026: A Nepita; 2026-Present: Ile Rouge
- Owner: 2002–07: Superfast Ferries; 2007–08: Veolia Transport; 2008–12: Sarl Poquelin Bail/SeaFrance; 2012–14: Scapino Shipping; 2014–present: Stena North Sea
- Operator: 2002–07: Superfast Ferries; 2007: SNCM; 2007: COTUNAV; 2007: ANEK Lines; 2008–12: SeaFrance; Nov 2012 – Nov 2014: DFDS; Dec 2014 – March 2020: Stena Line; March 2020 - January 2026: Corsica Linea; July 2026 - Present Marine Atlantic
- Port of registry: 2002–07: Piraeus, Greece; 2007–08: Ajaccio, France; 2008–12: Calais, France; 2012: Valletta,Malta; 2012–15: Le Havre,France; 2015–2020:Cardiff,UK; 2020: Limassol,Cyprus; 2020-present: Ajaccio, France
- Route: Dover–Calais (Until November 2014); Holyhead–Dublin (From March 2015); Marseille-Ajaccio (From Summer 2021); Marseille-Propriano (From February 2023)
- Builder: Howaldtswerke-Deutsche Werft, Kiel, Germany
- Yard number: 360
- Launched: 25 August 2001
- Christened: 26 February 2002 by Patricia Lederer
- Acquired: 26 February 2002
- In service: 27 February 2002
- Identification: IMO number: 9211511; Call sign: FNKG; MMSI number: 226269000

General characteristics (as Superfast X)
- Class & type: Superfast VII class fast ropax ferry
- Tonnage: 30,285 GT; 5,295 DWT
- Length: 203.30 m (667 ft)
- Beam: 25.00 m (82 ft)
- Draught: 6.50 m (21 ft 4 in)
- Ice class: 1 A Super
- Installed power: 4 × Wärtsilä-Sulzer NSD ZA V40S diesels; combined 46,000 kW
- Propulsion: 2 propellers
- Speed: 30.4 kn (56.30 km/h; 34.98 mph)
- Capacity: 626 passengers (728 after 2004 refit); 653 cars; 1,891 lane meters

General characteristics (as SeaFrance Molière)
- Tonnage: 30,285 GT
- Decks: 10
- Speed: 28.4 kn (52.60 km/h; 32.68 mph)
- Capacity: 1,200 passengers; 660 cars; 1,900 lane meters
- Notes: Otherwise the same as above

Île Rouge is a fast roll-on/roll-off ferry operating for Marine Atlantic owned by Stena RoRo. Before November 2014 she operated between Dover and Calais for DFDS Seaways France and between 2008 and 2012 for SeaFrance.

== Concept and construction ==
A Nepita was the last ship in a series of four identical ice classed fast ferries built by HDW for Superfast Ferries' new Baltic Sea services. She was launched on 18 November 2000, on the same date as her sisters Stena Superfast VII and Superfast IX Stena Superfast X was delivered to her owners on 26 February 2002 and christened on the same date by Patricia Lederer, wife of the HDW project director for the Superfast ships.

== Service history ==
Superfast X entered service for Superfast Ferries on 27 February 2002 on the Hanko–Rostock route. She remained on that route until 19 April 2002, when she was laid up in Kiel at HDW. On 17 May 2002, she re-entered service, on the Rosyth–Zeebrugge route. In January and February 2004, Superfast X was rebuilt at Fosen Mekaniske Verksted, Fosen, Norway with additional passenger berths. On 7 August 2006, Superfast Ferries announced it had sold Superfast X to Veolia Transport for €112 million. The ship was delivered to her new owners on 12 February 2007 and renamed Jean Nicoli.

In March 2007, Jean Nicoli made crossings from Le Havre to Marseille, carrying cars on board. During April the same year, she was chartered to COTUNAV for traffic from Italy and France to Tunisia. At the end of April she was laid up, initially at La Seyne, later at Marseille. From 8 September until 2 October 2007 she was chartered to ANEK Lines for service on its Patras–Corfu–Igoumenitsa–Venice route. On 27 December 2007, the ship was sold to SeaFrance.

In the beginning of April 2008, Jean Nicoli was delivered to SeaFrance and renamed SeaFrance Molière. On 3 April 2008, she left Marseille for Arno Dunkerque for rebuilding into a short distance ferry. After transfer to the leasing company Sarl Poquelin Bail, she entered service with SeaFrance in freight only operation on 19 August 2008 and began passenger service on 1 September 2008.

Due to the commercial court ordering that Seafrance be liquidated, from 16 November 2011 the ship was laid up, initially at Dunkerque and then, following her sale to Scapino Shipping , at Tilbury in England.

In October 2012, DFDS chartered the ship to be used on its Dover–Dunkerque crossing. During a short refit by Arno at Dunkerque she was renamed Dieppe Seaways and returned to the French registry. She re-entered service on 7 November though, following a change of plan, on the Dover-Calais route.

On 1 May 2014, Dieppe Seaways suffered a fire from an overheated boiler in the engine room as she approached Dover from Calais. All 316 passengers disembarked safely on arrival. However, in responding to the fire, seven crew members and three firefighters were injured with flash burns.

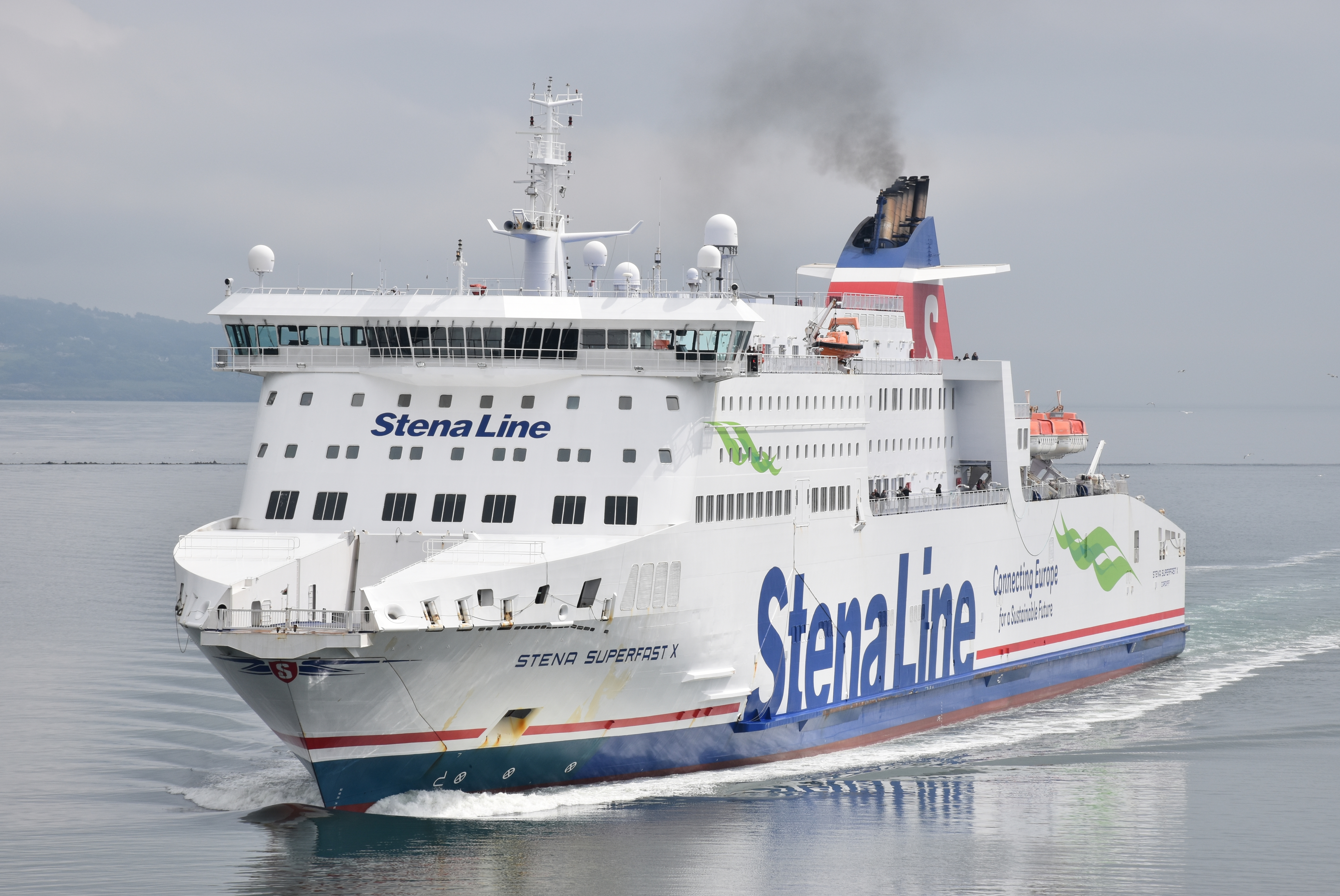
Stena Superfast X arriving in Dublin in 2017

At the end of her charter to DFDS Seaways in November 2014, Stena Line took possession of the vessel returning her to her original name, albeit with a Stena prefix, and sending her for an extensive refit to return the cargo arrangements to their original configuration and refurbish the interiors similar to sisterships Stena Superfast VII and Stena Superfast VIII operating on the Cairnryan (Loch Ryan) to Belfast route. After refit the ship replaced Stena Nordica (which itself is being chartered to DFDS Seaways to take up the timetable Stena Superfast X previous operated) on the Holyhead to Dublin route on 9 March 2015. Stena Superfast X substantially increased the freight and passenger capacity on the route and coincided with the withdrawal of the Stena HSS service to Dún Laoghaire. In January 2020 Stena line announced that Stena Superfast X would be chartered to Corsica Linea and will be renamed A. Nepita by her new owners. Before entering service with Corsica Linea, she was refitted into an overnight ferry in Piraeus, Greece. The refit included the addition of 131 cabins (94 of which were newly built and 33 are converted crew cabins), bringing the total number of passenger cabins to 176. Two scrubbers were also added.

In January 2026, Marine Atlantic, a Crown corporation based in St. John’s, Newfoundland and Labrador, announced a five-year charter agreement with Stena to lease A Nepita. The ship will undergo modifications for compatibility with Marine Atlantic’s docking infrastructure and put the Canadian flag and is scheduled to arrive in Canada in summer 2026, with entry into service planned for fall 2026 following integration and crew familiarization.
