= MS Knossos Palace =

High-speed ferry

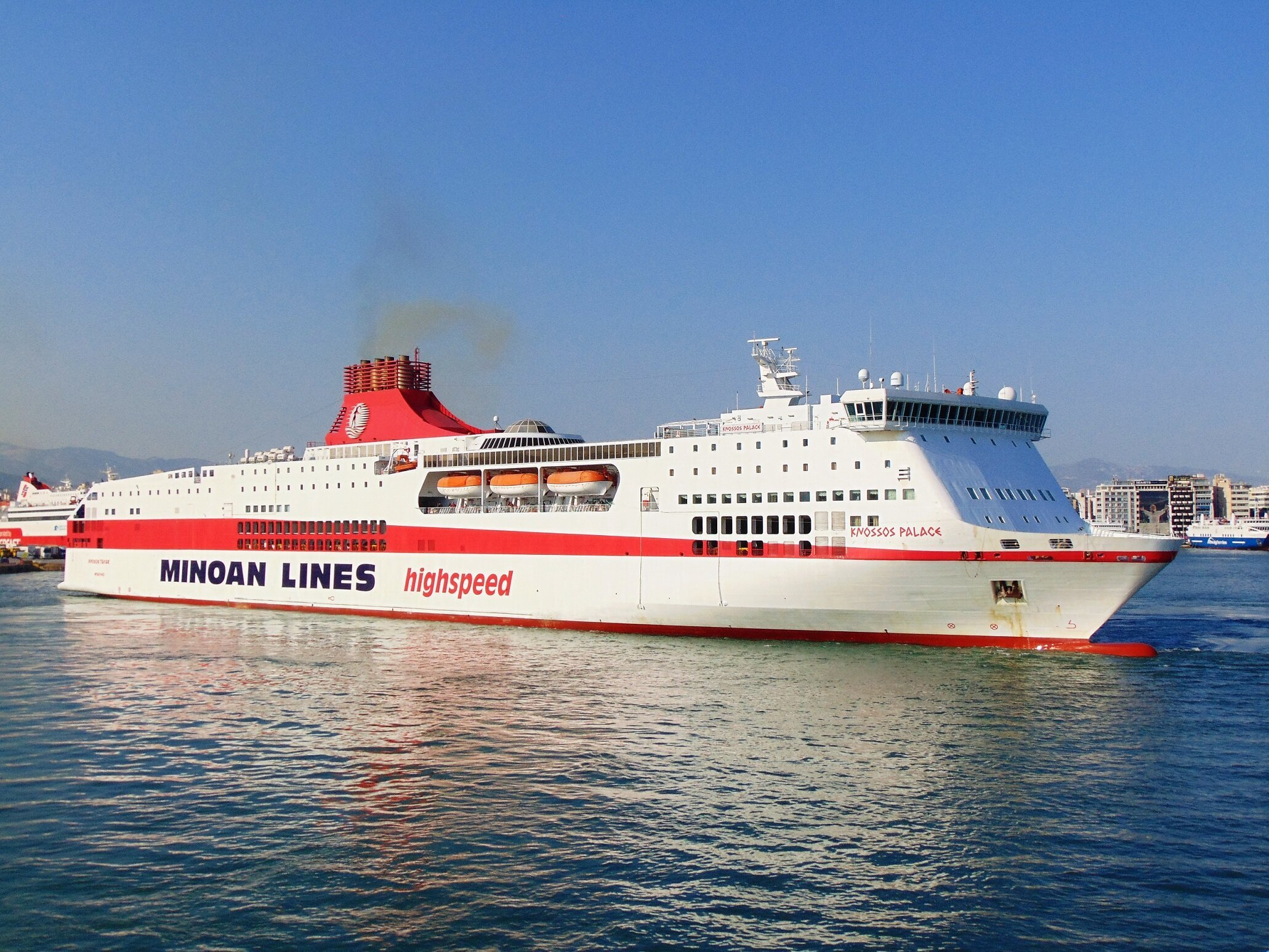
- Knossos Palace in Piraeus

History
- Name: (2001–2012): Olympia Palace; (2012–2018): Bonaria; (2018–2020): Cruise Bonaria; (2020–present): Knossos Palace
- Owner: (2001–2012): Minoan Lines; (2012–2018): Compagnia Italiana di Navigazione (Tirrenia); (2018–present): Grimaldi Euromed S.p.A.
- Operator: (2001–2012): Minoan Lines; (2012–2018): Tirrenia; (2018–2020): Grimaldi Lines; (2020–present): Minoan Lines
- Port of registry: (2001–2012): Heraklion, Greece; (2012–2018): Cagliari, Italy; (2018–2020): Palermo, Italy; (2020–present): Heraklion, Greece
- Route: Piraeus – Heraklion (Crete); Former: Ancona – Igoumenitsa – Patras; Former: Civitavecchia – Cagliari
- Builder: Fincantieri; Sestri Ponente (Genoa), Italy
- Yard number: 6073
- Launched: 14 June 2001
- Completed: 21 December 2001
- Acquired: December 2001
- Maiden voyage: December 2001
- In service: 2001
- Identification: IMO number: 9220330; Call sign: SVDJ4; MMSI number: 241726000
- Status: In service

General characteristics
- Class & type: Fincantieri High-Speed Cruise Ferry
- Tonnage: 36,825 GT; 6,000 DWT
- Length: 214.00 m (702 ft 1 in)
- Beam: 26.40 m (86 ft 7 in)
- Draft: 7.10 m (23 ft 4 in)
- Decks: 10
- Ramps: Stern loading ramps
- Installed power: 4 × Wärtsilä 16V46C diesel engines (total 62,520 kW / 83,840 hp)
- Propulsion: 2 × controllable pitch propellers
- Speed: 29.5 knots (54.6 km/h; 33.9 mph) (service) / 31.5 knots (58.3 km/h; 36.2 mph) (max)
- Capacity: 1,900 passengers (748 beds in cabins); 660 cars or 1,932 lane metres for freight
- Crew: 120
- Notes: Sister ship to Festos Palace

Knossos Palace (Greek: Κνωσός Παλάς, Knosós Palás) is a fast ferry of the Greek company Minoan Lines. Built in 2001 at the Fincantieri shipyards in Sestri Ponente on the outskirts of Genoa, it was originally named Olympia Palace (Greek: Ευρώπη Παλάς, Evrópi Palás). Commissioned in December 2001, initially operating on routes between Greece and Italy, it was then chartered in 2012 by the Italian company Tirrenia, which used it between mainland Italy and Sardinia under the name Bonaria. At the end of this charter in 2018, it joined the fleet of Grimaldi Lines, the parent company of Minoan Lines. Renamed Cruise Bonaria, it sailed on the Sardinian routes under the Grimaldi banner. In December 2020, it was exchanged with the ship Knossos Palace, it regained the latter's name and rejoined the fleet of its original company Minoan Lines, which now employed it on the routes connecting Piraeus and Crete.

== History ==
=== Origins and construction ===
Since the second half of the 1990s, the Greek companies Minoan Lines and Superfast Ferries have been in fierce competition on the routes between Greece and Italy. Superfast had indeed revolutionized this service as early as 1995 by putting into service two state-of-the-art car ferries, combining the size and comfort of a classic ferry with a high speed close to that of a high-speed ship, which immediately met with significant success.

In 1998, Minoan Lines announced a major fleet renewal program worth $900 million. Seven ships were planned for delivery by 2002; two were intended to serve the Piraeus - Crete route, while the other five would operate in the Adriatic. The Adriatic ships were divided into two series: one focused on freight transport and the other on passenger transport.

Named Olympia Palace and Europa Palace, the future ships are designed similarly to their sister ships, Knossos Palace and Festos Palace, intended for operation in the Aegean Sea. They share the same dimensions and a very similar appearance. The only difference lies in the configuration of the garage, designed to carry a larger cargo capacity than their predecessors. Their propulsion system is the same as their predecessors, allowing them to reach speeds of 29 knots.

Built by the Italian company Fincantieri on the Sestri Ponente site, in the suburbs of Genoa, the Olympia Palace was launched on June 14, 2001. After finishing, it was delivered to Minoan Lines on December 11.

=== Service ===
==== Minoan Lines (2001–2018) ====
The Olympia Palace was opened on December 21, 2001, between Patras, Igoumenitsa and Ancona. On July 14, 2006, it was involved in a collision at the level of its bow bulb in the port of Patras, resulting in its immobilization until July 19.

Due to the economic crisis leading to a decrease in the number of passengers between Greece and Italy, Minoan Lines decided to withdraw the ship from service in December 2010. The Olympia Palace was chartered by Grimaldi Lines, the parent company of Minoan Lines, which operates it between Italy and Tunisia. In 2011, it operated between Italy and Spain from January to February. It was then laid up at Perama. In July, the Olympia Palace and its sister ship were chartered by the Italian company Tirrenia.

The ship arrived at the Palumbo shipyards in Messina on July 19, in order to undergo some modifications in preparation for its new assignment. The Tirrenia logos are painted in blue on its hull and funnel, and the ship is renamed Bonaria. It is also registered under the Italian flag.

The Bonaria began its rotations on behalf of Tirrenia in August 2012, between Civitavecchia, Arbatax, and Cagliari, in Sardinia. It replaced Tirrenia's older Strade Romane -class ships on this route, along with its sister ship, renamed Amsicora. Their speed reduces the crossing time to 11 hours instead of the previous 15–16 hours. For profitability reasons, their cruising speed is set at 22 knots. Operating these ships at full power on these less busy routes would indeed result in losses for the company.

==== Grimaldi Lines (2018–2020) ====
When the charter ended on January 22, 2018, the Bonaria joined the Grimaldi Lines fleet while its sister ship returns to the Minoan Lines colors. Renamed Cruise Bonaria, it is assigned to Grimaldi routes and still serves Sardinia, but this time between Livorno and Olbia.

On January 24, 2019, while maneuvering to depart from Olbia, strong gusts of wind caused the ship to deviate from its course, resulting in a collision with the Tirrenia company ferry Athara, which was docked nearby. The impact caused damage to the port wing of the Athara's bridge.

During its technical stop, carried out in Malta at the Palumbo shipyard in Valletta at the end of 2019, the Cruise Bonaria was fitted with exhaust gas scrubbers, commonly known as scrubbers, to reduce its sulfur emissions. The work involved minor modifications to the funnel, which was raised to allow for the installation of the device.

On June 18, 2020, as the ship was completing a crossing between Livorno and Olbia, a fire broke out on the upper car deck. Starting from a refrigerated trailer, the blaze was quickly brought under control by the crew with the help of the fire brigade. The Cruise Bonaria finally docked at the Isola Bianca pier around 6:30 p.m. and disembarked its 150 passengers.

==== Minoan Lines (since 2020) ====
In December 2020, the Grimaldi Group decided to exchange the Cruise Bonaria for the Knossos Palace of Minoan Lines. The Cruise Bonaria thus rejoined its original company's fleet under the name Knossos Palace and returned to the Greek flag. After some modifications at the Perama shipyards, during which it was repainted in Minoan Lines colors, it was assigned to service between Piraeus and Herakleion.

== Facilities ==
The Knossos Palace has 10 decks. Although the ship actually spans 12 decks, one is absent at the car deck level to allow the ship to carry cargo. Passenger areas occupy decks 9 through 7. Decks 2, 3, and 5 are dedicated to car decks.

=== Common areas ===
The Knossos Palace has comfortable facilities for passengers, most of which are located on deck 7. The ship has two dining areas, three bars including an outdoor one with a pool, and a shopping arcade.

=== Cabins ===
The Knossos Palace has 190 cabins, mostly located on deck 8. They are generally equipped with two to four berths and a bathroom with shower, toilet, and sink. A lounge with 108 seats is also available.

== Features ==
The Knossos Palace is 214m long and 26.40m wide, with a gross tonnage of 36,825 GT. The ship has a passenger capacity of 1,900 and features a garage with space for 660 vehicles and 140 trailers spread over four levels. The garage is accessible via two ramp doors located at the stern. Propulsion is provided by four Wärtsilä 16V46C diesel engines, producing a combined output of 62,520 kW, driving two controllable-pitch propellers, giving the vessel a top speed of 29.5 knots. The Cruise Bonaria has six large, enclosed lifeboats, three located on each side amidships. These are complemented by a rigid inflatable boat. In addition to these primary lifeboats, the ship carries several liferafts with automatic inflators that deploy upon contact with water. The ship is equipped with two bow thrusters to facilitate docking and undocking maneuvers, as well as two stern thrusters. Since 2019, the Knossos Palace has been equipped with scrubbers, exhaust gas cleaning devices that reduce sulfur emissions.

== Routes served ==
From 2002 to 2010, the Olympia Palace operated the route between Greece and Italy for Minoan Lines, primarily on the Patras - Igoumenitsa - Ancona route, but also on the Patras - Igoumenitsa - Venice route. It occasionally sailed between Piraeus and Heraklion in Crete, replacing the ships usually assigned to the route.

From 2012 to 2018, the ship was used for crossings between mainland Italy and Sardinia on the Civitavecchia - Arbatax - Cagliari route under charter by Tirrenia.

Between 2018 and 2020, it served the Grimaldi Lines routes between Livorno and Olbia before being returned to Minoan Lines and being used on the Aegean Sea routes to Crete between Piraeus, Heraklion and Chania.
