= Zeus Palace =

Italian ferry

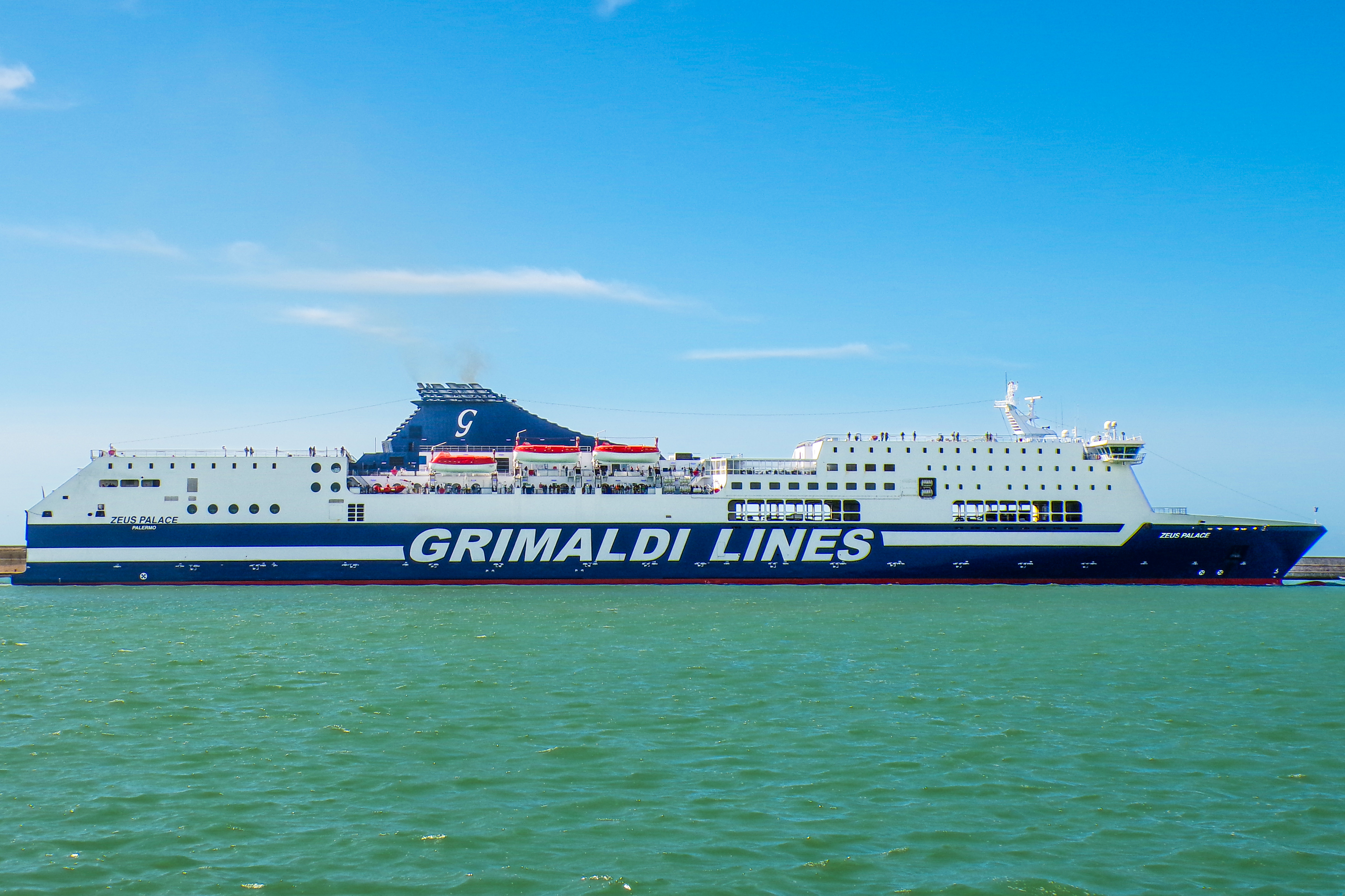
- Zeus Palace in Livorno

History

Italy
- Name: 2001–2005: Prometheus; 2005–2009: Eurostar Barcelona; 2009–present: Zeus Palace
- Namesake: Greek god Prometheus; Ancient god Zeus
- Owner: 2001–2003: Minoan Lines; 2003–2005: Caronte and Tourist; 2005–2005: Grimaldi Euromed; 2005–2009: ACL Ship Owners; 2009–2011: Grimaldi Deep Sea; 2011–present: Grimaldi Euromed
- Operator: 2001–2003: Minoan Lines; 2003–2005: Caronte and Tourist; 2005–2008: Grimaldi Lines; 2008–2009: Minoan Lines; 2009–2010: Grimaldi Lines; 2010–2012: Grandi Navi Veloci; 2012–present: Grimaldi Lines
- Port of registry: 2001–2005: Heraklion, Greece; 2005–present: Palermo, Italy
- Ordered: 1998
- Builder: Samsung Heavy Industries, South Korea
- Launched: 12 August 2000
- Maiden voyage: Spring 2001
- Identification: IMO number: 9208071; MMSI: 247131600
- Status: In active service

General characteristics
- Class & type: Samsung 212m Cruise Ferry
- Tonnage: 31,730 GT; 7,680 DWT
- Length: 211.90 m (695 ft 3 in)
- Beam: 25.00 m (82 ft 0 in)
- Draft: 6.60 m (21 ft 8 in)
- Decks: 8
- Ramps: Stern loading ramps
- Installed power: 4 × Wärtsilä 12V46C diesel engines (total 50,400 kW / 67,587 hp)
- Propulsion: 2 × controllable pitch propellers
- Speed: 27.0 knots (50.0 km/h; 31.1 mph) (service) / 32.0 knots (59.3 km/h; 36.8 mph) (max)
- Capacity: 1,720 passengers (202 cabins); 2,050 lane metres (approx. 540 cars)
- Notes: Steel cruise ferry hull design built by Samsung Heavy Industries (Yard No. 1279)

Zeus Palace is a mixed passenger-cargo ship belonging to the Italian company Grimaldi Lines. Built between 2000 and 2001 by the South Korean shipyard Samsung Heavy Industries in Geoje for the Greek company Minoan Lines under the name Prometheus (Προμηθέας , Promitheas), it entered service in April 2001 between Greece and Italy. Sold in October 2003 to the shipping company Caronte & Tourist, which operated it between mainland Italy and Sicily, it was then sold again to the Italian shipping company Grimaldi. It was assigned to international routes between Italy and Spain under the name Eurostar Barcelona. Chartered from 2008 by its original company, Minoan Lines, now a subsidiary of the Grimaldi Group, it returned to service between Italy and Greece. Renamed Zeus Palace in 2009, it returned to Grimaldi's routes before being chartered by Grandi Navi Veloci, which operated it between mainland Italy and Sicily from 2010 to 2012. Back in the Grimaldi Lines fleet at the end of 2012, it was assigned between Italy, Spain and Morocco and then between the mainland, Sicily and Tunisia in 2013. It currently sails on routes to Sardinia or Sicily depending on the period.

== History ==
=== Origins and construction ===
Since the second half of the 1990s, the Greek companies Minoan Lines and Superfast Ferries have been in fierce competition on the routes between Greece and Italy. Superfast had indeed revolutionized this service as early as 1995 by putting into service two state-of-the-art car ferries, combining the size and comfort of a classic ferry with a high speed close to that of a high-speed ship, which immediately met with significant success.

To protect itself against the arrival of Superfast, Minoan had also commissioned a new ship, the Aretousa, which also entered service in 1995. But despite its slightly larger dimensions, its speed proved to be lower than that of its competitors. This was rectified, however, with the commissioning of two improved sister ships, the Ikarus in 1997 and the Pasiphae in 1998, capable of reaching speeds equivalent to those of Superfast's vessels. Superfast responded with two new car ferries in 1998 and the announcement of plans to build more units in the short term.

Thus, as early as 1998, Minoan Lines announced a major fleet renewal program worth $900 million. Seven ships were planned for delivery by 2002: two to serve the Piraeus - Crete route, and the other five to operate in the Adriatic. The Adriatic ships were divided into two series: the first focused on passenger transport and the second on freight. The construction of these latter ships, named Prometheus, Oceanus, and Ariadne after the Greek mythological figures Prometheus, Oceanus, and Ariadne, was entrusted to the South Korean shipyard Samsung Heavy Industries.

Their design is primarily geared towards freight transport; thus, the sister ships feature a spacious, two-level garage specifically designed for trailers. Despite this, the passenger facilities offer a high level of comfort, including a bar, a restaurant, an outdoor swimming pool, and approximately one hundred cabins with private bathrooms. These vessels are designed to cruise at speeds exceeding 30 knots, and their propulsion system is among the most sophisticated in the world. Finally, they are relatively large, measuring 212 meters in length and 25 meters in width.

The Prometheus was launched on August 12, 2000. After finishing, it was delivered to Minoan Lines on March 14, 2001.

=== Service ===
==== Minoan Lines (2001–2003) ====
With its construction completed, the Prometheus left South Korea for the Mediterranean. Upon arrival in Greece, the ship was commissioned on April 6, 2001, on the Patras - Igoumenitsa - Venice line then is transferred from October on the Patras - Igoumenitsa - Ancona line.

In order to reduce its debts and increase its capital, Minoan decided to sell several of its ships. The Prometheus was initially chartered by the Caronte & Tourist group in September 2003 to be operated between Livorno and Catania, in Sicily. In October, Caronte & Tourist finally acquired it.

==== Caronte & Tourist (2003–2005) ====
Delivered to its new owner on January 17, 2004, the ship retains its assignment to Sicily, but this time departing from Salerno. It also retains its original name and is now registered under the Italian flag. His career with Caronte & Tourist was short-lived, in October 2004 it is reported as having been sold to Grimaldi Ferries, a subsidiary of the Grimaldi Group.

==== Grimaldi Lines (since 2005) ====
Delivered to Grimaldi Ferries on January 31, 2005, the ship was renamed Eurostar Barcelona. After some conversion work including the addition of extra cabins, it entered service in 2005 between Italy and Spain as part of the establishment of the Motorway of the Sea.

With the line proving quite successful, Grimaldi then considered putting larger ships into service between Civitavecchia and Barcelona. Replaced in 2008 by the gigantic Cruise Barcelona, the Eurostar Barcelona was initially rerouted between Livorno and Barcelona during the summer season.

After briefly sailing between Toulon and Civitavecchia between September and October, it was chartered by its original owner, Minoan Lines, which had meanwhile become a subsidiary of the Grimaldi Group, and which again operated it between Greece and Italy, replacing the Pasiphae Palace. During its technical refit in the month of March 2009, it was renamed Zeus Palace.

On August 10, 2009, it ran aground on a sandbank near Venice but was freed after fourteen hours.

At the end of the charter contract in November, the Zeus Palace returned to the Grimaldi Lines fleet. Between November and December, it temporarily replaced the sister ships Cruise Roma and Cruise Barcelona during their maintenance stops between Civitavecchia and Barcelona, and was then transferred to the Sicily and Tunisia service from Salerno and Civitavecchia.

Starting from the month of February 2010, the ship is chartered by the company Grandi Navi Veloci, which operates it to Palermo initially from Genoa and then from Civitavecchia from March.

On October 20, while the Zeus Palace was in Genoa, a fire broke out in the engine room, specifically in one of the auxiliary engines. Despite the crew's swift intervention, which managed to extinguish the blaze, the damage resulted in the ship being immobilized. It was only on December 14 that it was taken to the Palumbo shipyard in Messina, Sicily, for repairs. After the work was completed, it returned to service in March 2011.

At the end of the charter on September 28, 2012, the ship again serves the Greek-Italian routes of Minoan Lines between October and December before being assigned to the Grimaldi Lines routes between Italy, Spain and Morocco. Back between Italy, Sicily and Tunisia at the beginning of 2013, it served one last time on the Minoan Lines routes during the summer season before being redeployed again on the routes it operated at the beginning of 2013.

During the 2010s, the Zeus Palace split its time between serving Sicily and Sardinia from Livorno. In 2016, with the arrival of the Cruise Oblia, the ship inaugurated a new route between Civitavecchia and Olbia.

From 2018, it was transferred to Sicily between Livorno and Palermo following the commissioning of the Cruise Ausonia on Sardinia. Transferred to the Greek routes in the summer of 2021, the Zeus Palace sails during the season and part of the winter between Ancona and Patras. In May 2022, Grimaldi Lines decided to open a route linking Savona and Porto Torres ; the Zeus Palace inaugurated this route on May 15 and the ship is expected to be used there all summer.

== Facilities ==
The Zeus Palace has eight decks. Although the ship actually spans 10 decks, two are absent in the car deck area to allow for cargo transport. Passenger accommodations occupy decks 5, 6, and 7. Decks 2, 3, and 4 are dedicated to car decks.

=== Common areas ===
The Zeus Palace 's communal facilities are mostly located on deck 5. The ship features a lounge bar, an à la carte restaurant, a self-service restaurant, a shopping arcade, and a casino. An outdoor pool with a lido bar is also located on deck 6. Until 2005, an ice cream parlor was located on deck 7.

=== Cabins ===
Originally, the Prometheus had 180 internal and external cabins located on decks 5 and 6, at the front of the ship. Most of these had two to four berths, and some had a double bed. All were equipped with private bathrooms including a shower, toilet, and sink. A lounge with approximately 100 armchairs was also located at the rear of the ship on deck 5. During the refit carried out by Grimaldi in 2005, two sets of new cabins were added, one on deck 7 behind the navigation bridge and the other aft on deck 6, thus bringing the total number of cabins to 202.

== Features ==
The Zeus Palace is 212 meters long and 25 meters wide. Its original tonnage was 26,995 GT, which was increased to 31,730 GT in 2005. The ship can accommodate 1,300 passengers and has a garage that can hold approximately 1,000 vehicles or 122 trailers. The garage is accessible via two ramp doors located at the stern; a third, smaller door, also located at the stern, allows foot passengers to directly access the ship's reception area on deck 6. The Zeus Palace is powered by four Wärtsilä 12V46C diesel engines, developing a combined power of 50,424 kW, driving two propellers that propel the vessel at a speed of 30.5 knots, making it one of the fastest ships in its class. The ship has four large lifeboats, two medium-sized lifeboats, and one rigid inflatable rescue boat, as well as several life rafts. It is also equipped with two bow thrusters, a stern thruster, and a roll stabilizer.

== Routes served ==
For Minoan Lines, the ship provided service between Greece and Italy on the Patras - Igoumenitsa - Venice route during the summer of 2001, then on the Patras - Igoumenitsa - Ancona route from October.

According to Caronte & Tourist, the Prometheus sailed between mainland Italy and Sicily from Livorno and Salerno to Catania.

For Grimaldi Lines, it initially operated the Civitavecchia - Barcelona route between Italy and Spain from 2005 to 2008, then the Livorno-Barcelona route, before being temporarily assigned to the Civitavecchia- Toulon route between Italy and France. From 2009, it was transferred to service between Sicily and Tunisia from mainland Italy on the Salerno- Palermo - Tunis and Civitavecchia- Trapani -Tunis routes.

On several occasions, the Zeus Palace sailed under charter for other shipowners such as Minoan Lines, which operated it again between Greece and Italy between 2008 and 2009, then in 2012 and 2013, but also the Grandi Navi Veloci company, which sailed it between mainland Italy and Sicily on the Genoa - Palermo and Civitavecchia - Palermo routes from 2010 to 2012.

Currently, the Zeus Palace is assigned to Grimaldi Lines' routes between mainland Italy and Sicily on the Livorno-Palermo route. It also occasionally serves the shipping company's other routes to Sardinia, Spain, or Morocco.

== Sister ships ==
- Mega Express Three
- Moby Tommy
