= Florencia (ship) =

Ferry built in Italy

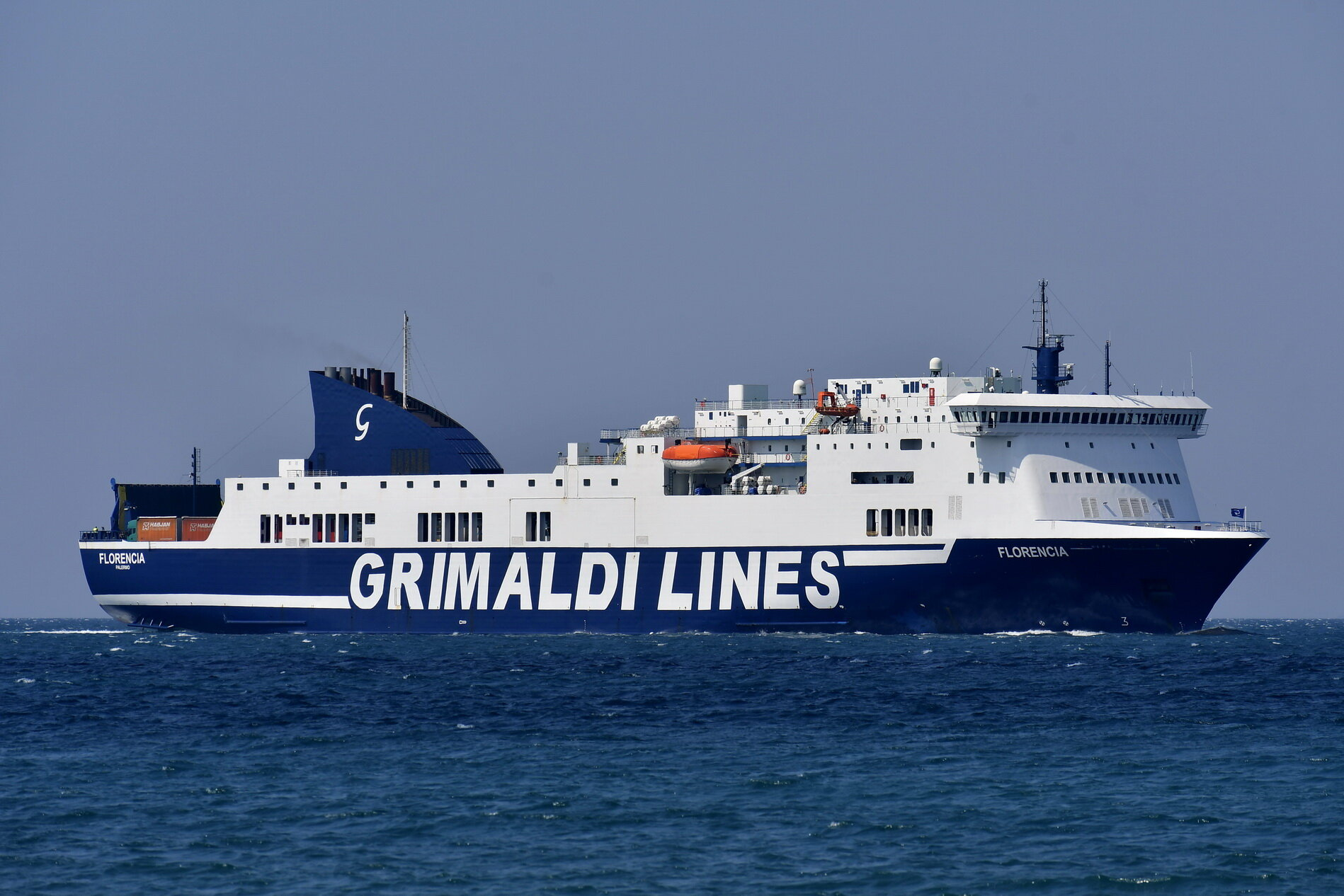
- Florencia in Patras

History
- Name: (2004–2007): Golfo Aranci; (2007–present): Florencia
- Owner: (2004–2006): Lloyd Sardegna; (2006–2007): Moby Lines; (2007–present): Grimaldi Euromed S.p.A.
- Operator: (2004–2006): Lloyd Sardegna; (2006–2007): Moby Lines; (2007–present): Grimaldi Lines / Minoan Lines
- Port of registry: (2004–2007): Livorno, Italy; (2007–present): Palermo, Italy
- Route: Ancona – Igoumenitsa – Corfu; Former: Livorno – Olbia / Barcelona; Former: Piombino – Olbia; Former: Naples – Catania; Former: Civitavecchia – Porto Torres; Former: Brindisi – Igoumenitsa – Patras
- Ordered: 2002
- Builder: Cantiere Navale Visentini; Porto Viro, Italy
- Yard number: 209
- Laid down: 18 December 2002
- Launched: 20 December 2003
- Completed: 30 April 2004
- Acquired: 30 April 2004 (as Golfo Aranci) May 2007 (by Grimaldi Lines)
- Maiden voyage: 17 May 2004
- In service: 2004
- Identification: IMO number: 9287584; Call sign: IBPD; MMSI number: 247105900
- Status: In service

General characteristics
- Class & type: Visentini Class Ro-Pax Ferry
- Tonnage: 26,701 GT; 7,499 DWT
- Length: 186.36 m (611 ft 5 in)
- Beam: 25.60 m (84 ft 0 in)
- Draft: 6.60 m (21 ft 8 in)
- Decks: 8
- Ramps: Stern loading ramp
- Installed power: 2 × MAN B&W 9L48/60 diesel engines (total 21,600 kW / 28,966 hp)
- Propulsion: 2 × controllable pitch propellers
- Speed: 22.5 knots (41.7 km/h; 25.9 mph) (max) / 20.0 knots (37.0 km/h; 23.0 mph) (service)
- Capacity: 1,000 passengers (214 cabins); 2,250 lane metres for freight / vehicles
- Crew: 45
- Notes: Sister ship to Venezia

Florencia is a 186.36-metre Ro-Pax passenger and vehicle ferry owned by Grimaldi Euromed S.p.A. and operated by Grimaldi Lines. Built in 2004 by Cantiere Navale Visentini in Porto Viro, Italy, as part of the builder's popular series of standardized Ro-Pax ferries, the 26,701 GT vessel was acquired by the Grimaldi Group shortly after completion. Powered by twin MAN B&W 9L48/60 diesel engines generating 21,600 kW, she operates at a service speed of 22 knots and primarily serves Grimaldi's cross-Adriatic and Mediterranean routes.

== Characteristics ==
The vessel is powered by two MAN-B&W 9L48/60 21,600 kW diesel engines, allowing it to reach a cruising speed of 23.5 knots. Measuring 186 meters long and 27 meters wide, the ferry can carry 1,000 passengers and 150 vehicles, or 2,244 linear meters of cargo. During the renovations carried out in 2025, a section was added that includes new cabins and common areas, increasing the number of cabins from 96 to 129.

== Service ==
The first of a class of two Ro-Pax vessels, she is similar to the Catania and Sorrento. Ordered in 2002 by Lloyd Sardegna from Cantieri Navali Visentini in Porto Viro together with her sister ship Golfo degli Angeli to replace Golfo dei Coralli and Golfo dei Delfini (which were not taken over due to the delay in delivery from the Stocznia Szczecinska im. A. Warskiego shipyard in Szczecin), the vessel was launched on 20 December 2003 with the name Golfo Aranci and delivered to Lloyd Sardegna on 30 April 2004, entering service on 17 May on the Piombino - Olbia route, occasionally making trips on the Livorno - Olbia route.

In 2006, like all Lloyd Sardegna ships, it was transferred to Moby Lines. Initially, it was thought to rename it Moby Easy and put it into service on the Moby routes, but with the purchase of the Moby Tommy the idea was abandoned and in May 2007 the ship was sold to Atlantica di Navigazione (Grimaldi Lines), being renamed Florencia and entering service that same month on the Livorno - Barcelona / Valencia line. On 24 June it was moved to the new Livorno - Porto Vecchio line, where it remained until 9 September, before returning to the Livorno - Barcelona / Valencia line.

The same operation was repeated the following year: on 22 June 2008 she returned to service on the Livorno - Porto Vecchio line, remaining there until 8 September 2008 (when the line was closed). Until July 2012 she remained on the Livorno - Barcelona / Valencia line, after which she was moved to the Adriatic, entering service in the same month on the Brindisi - Igoumenitsa - Patras line. From 12 September to 2 October she was chartered to Minoan Lines for use on the Ancona - Igoumenitsa - Patras line, returning to her own line on 3 October.

In January 2013, she began her charter to Grandi Navi Veloci, which used her on the Civitavecchia - Termini Imerese route. Returned to Grimaldi in May 2015, she was inserted on the new Savona - Barcelona connection.

In May 2016 she began her charter to TTT Lines and entered service on the Naples - Catania route alongside the Cartour Gamma. With the purchase of 100% of TTT Lines and the Cartour Gamma by Grimaldi, in 2018 the Florencia ceased service on the Naples - Catania route and was first positioned on the Civitavecchia - Olbia and at the end of June on the Livorno - Palermo, where she remained for approximately 2 weeks, before returning to Greece after 5 years of absence. In December 2018 she was transferred to Besiktas Shipyard in Yalova, Turkey to undergo a refit and be repainted in the new Grimaldi Lines livery.

In January 2019 she returned to service. At the beginning of June 2019 she briefly replaced the Cruise Ausonia (which in turn replaced the Cruise Barcelona on the Civitavecchia - Porto Torres - Barcelona route) on the Civitavecchia - Olbia route. In April 2020 she entered service on the Salerno - Palermo - Tunis route, replacing the Catania, which was stopped at the Besiktas Shipyard for dry docking works.

In March 2021 it entered service for Grimaldi Minoan Lines on the Ancona - Igoumenitsa route, initially in tandem with the Corfu and from 2 June together with its sister ship Venezia. On 19 February 2022, she entered service on the Brindisi - Igoumenitsa route, replacing the Euroferry Olympia, which was destroyed in a fire.
