= Venezia (ferry) =

Ferry operated by Grimaldi Lines

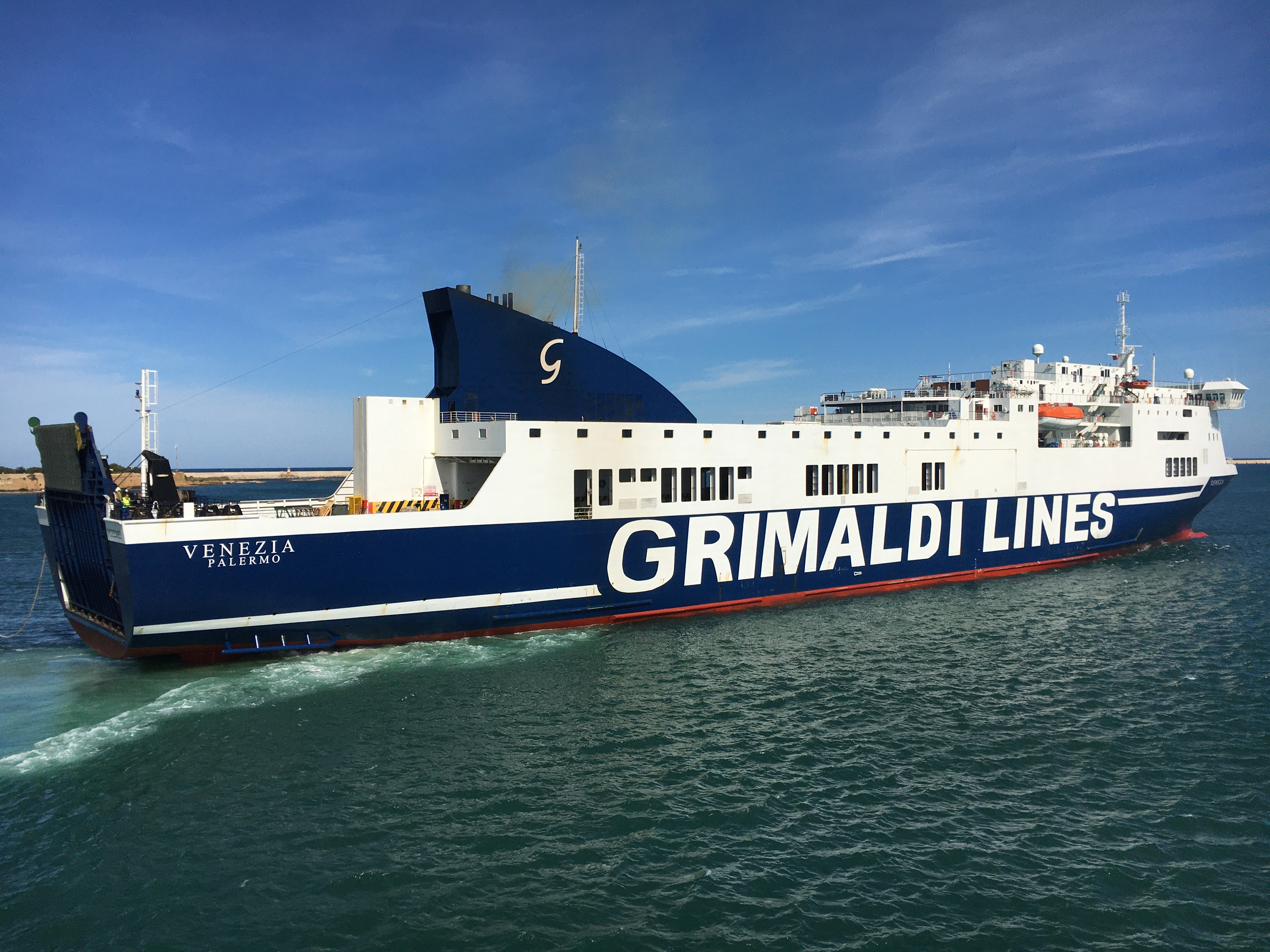
- Venezia in Brindisi

History
- Name: (2004–2007): Golfo degli Angeli; (2007–2010): Maria Grazia On; (2010–2019): Albayzin; (2019–2020): Ciudad de Cádiz; (2020–present): Venezia
- Namesake: Italian city of Venice
- Owner: (2004–2006): Lloyd Sardegna; (2006–2016): Moby Lines; (2016–2019): Trasmediterránea / Compañía Trasmediterránea S.A.; (2019–present): Grimaldi Euromed S.p.A.
- Operator: (2004–2006): Lloyd Sardegna; (2007–2010): Moby Lines / T-Link Lines; (2010–2019): Trasmediterránea; (2019–present): Grimaldi Lines / Minoan Lines
- Port of registry: (2004–2016): Livorno, Italy; (2016–2019): Limassol, Cyprus; (2019–present): Palermo, Italy
- Route: Ancona – Corfu – Igoumenitsa; Former: Cádiz – Canary Islands; Former: Livorno – Olbia
- Ordered: 2002
- Builder: Cantiere Navale Visentini; Porto Viro, Italy
- Yard number: 210
- Laid down: 2003
- Launched: 2004
- Completed: October 2004
- Acquired: October 2004 (as Golfo degli Angeli) December 2019 (by Grimaldi Group)
- Maiden voyage: October 2004
- In service: 2004
- Identification: IMO number: 9304631; Call sign: IBIU; MMSI number: 247408100
- Status: In service

General characteristics
- Class & type: Visentini Class Ro-Pax Ferry
- Tonnage: 26,400 GT; 7,200 DWT
- Length: 186.36 m (611 ft 5 in)
- Beam: 25.60 m (84 ft 0 in)
- Draught: 6.50 m (21 ft 4 in)
- Decks: 8
- Ramps: Stern loading ramp
- Installed power: 2 × MAN B&W 9L48/60 diesel engines (total 21,600 kW / 28,966 hp)
- Propulsion: 2 × controllable pitch propellers
- Speed: 24.0 knots (44.4 km/h; 27.6 mph) (service)
- Capacity: 1,000 passengers (cabin & seat accommodations); 2,230 lane metres for freight / vehicles + 190 cars
- Crew: 45
- Notes: Sister ship to Florencia

Venezia is a 186.36-metre Ro-Pax ferry owned by Grimaldi Euromed S.p.A. and operated by Grimaldi Lines (and previously by Minoan Lines). Built in 2004 by Cantiere Navale Visentini in Porto Viro, Italy, she was originally delivered as Golfo degli Angeli for Lloyd Sardegna. Over her career, she operated as Maria Grazia On, Albayzin, and Ciudad de Cádiz before being acquired by Grimaldi Lines in 2019 and renamed Venezia in 2020. Powered by twin MAN B&W 9L48/60 diesel engines generating 21,600 kW, she operates at a service speed of 24 knots and serves major Adriatic routes connecting Italy and Greece.

== Characteristics ==
The ferry, a latest-generation ro-pax, is capable of carrying a maximum of 179 vehicles, or, alternatively, 2,623 linear meters of cargo. The Venezia is also capable of carrying a maximum of 946 passengers, accommodated in 99 cabins. Powered by two MAN -B&W 9L48/60 engines, generating a total power of 21,600 kW, it is capable of reaching a top speed of 23 knots, making it ideal for contributing to the development of motorways of the sea.

== Service ==
Launched on 12 June 2004 at the Visentini shipyard in Porto Viro with the name Golfo degli Angeli and delivered on 20 September to Lloyd Sardegna, it entered service on 28 September on the routes between Piombino, Livorno and Olbia, together with its twin ship Golfo Aranci.

In 2006, with the acquisition of Lloyd Sardegna by Moby Lines, it passed to the latter together with the rest of the fleet, continuing to operate on the connections between Piombino and Olbia. In May 2007 it was renamed Maria Grazia On. and, after the sale of the Golfo Aranci, it was joined on its route by the Moby Tommy.

In October 2007 it was rented to Caronte & Tourist and used on the connections between Salerno and Messina as a replacement for the Cartour. In May 2008 the charter to Caronte & Tourist ends and the vessel returns to service for Moby Lines on the connections between Piombino, Livorno and Olbia.

From autumn 2008 to May 2009 it was again rented to Caronte & Tourist and used again on the connections between Salerno and Messina. In the 2009 summer season it operates on the connections between Piombino, Livorno and Olbia and on those between Livorno and Bastia. From November 2009 to February 2010 it was chartered to T-Link Lines and used on the connections between Voltri and Termini Imerese.

In March 2010 it was chartered on a long-term basis to Trasmediterránea and, renamed Albayzin, entered service on 13 March on the routes between Barcelona and Tangier Med under the FerriMaroc flag. On 7 October 2010 it was transferred to the connections between Cadiz and the Canary Islands.

On 19 January 2016 it was sold outright to Trasmediterránea and raised the Cypriot flag. In May 2019 it was renamed Ciudad de Cádiz On 25 November 2019, its sale to Grimaldi Lines was announced, to which it was delivered on 4 December. Renamed Venezia, it entered service on the connections between Brindisi, Igoumenitsa and Patras.

In the 2020 summer season it was transferred to the connections between Venice, Patras and Igoumenitsa. Subsequently, it was briefly used in October to inaugurate the new connections between Salerno and Cagliari. On 2 June 2021 it began service on the connections between Ancona and Igoumenitsa, where it still operates today in tandem with its twin ship Florencia.

In March 2025, the vessel underwent renovations at the Perama shipyard, during which a superstructure was added and significant changes were made to the common areas. Furthermore, the number of cabins increased from 99 to 129.
