= MS Jean Nicoli =

A number of ships have been named Jean Nicoli after the Corsican Jean Nicoli (Resistance leader), killed in 1943, including:

- MS Jean Nicoli (1997), under this name 2009–present
- MS Jean Nicoli (2001), under this name 2007–2008
