= Festos Palace =

Greek cruise ferry built by Fincantieri

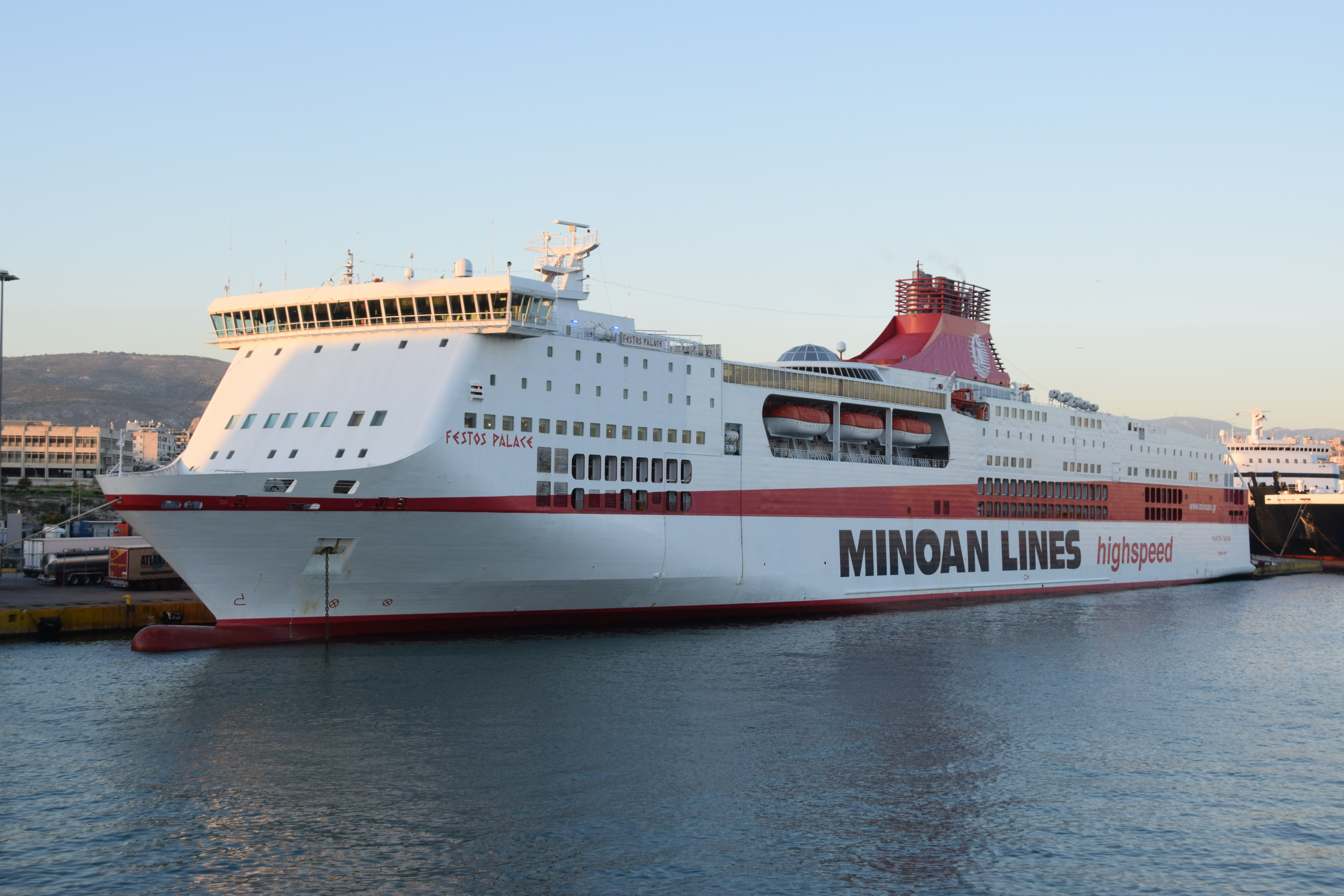
- Festos Palace in Piraeus

History
- Name: (2002–2012): Europa Palace; (2012–2018): Amsicora; (2018–2020): Mykonos Palace; (2020–present): Festos Palace
- Owner: (2002–2012): Minoan Lines Shipping SA; (2012–2018): Minoan Italia S.p.A.; (2018–present): Grimaldi Euromed S.p.A.
- Operator: (2002–2012): Minoan Lines; (2012–2018): Tirrenia; (2018–present): Minoan Lines
- Port of registry: (2002–2012): Iraklion, Greece; (2012–2018): Cagliari, Italy; (2018–present): Iraklion, Greece
- Route: Piraeus – Heraklion
- Ordered: 1999
- Builder: Fincantieri - Cantieri Navali Italiani S.p.A.; Sestri Ponente, Genoa, Italy
- Yard number: 6074
- Laid down: 2001
- Launched: 26 October 2001
- Completed: 10 May 2002
- Acquired: 10 May 2002
- In service: 14 May 2002
- Identification: IMO number: 9220342; Call sign: SVDA8; MMSI number: 241617000
- Status: In service

General characteristics
- Class & type: Fast Cruise Ferry / Ro-Pax ferry
- Tonnage: 36,800 GT; 5,400 DWT
- Length: 214.00 m (702 ft 1 in)
- Beam: 26.40 m (86 ft 7 in)
- Draft: 6.90 m (22 ft 8 in)
- Decks: 8
- Installed power: 4 × Wärtsilä 16V46C diesel engines (total 67,200 kW)
- Propulsion: 2 × controllable pitch propellers
- Speed: 29.0 knots (53.7 km/h; 33.4 mph) (service) 31.5 knots (58.3 km/h; 36.2 mph) (max)
- Capacity: 2104 passengers; 735 cars or 135 trucks + 100 cars

Festos Palace (Greek: Φαιστός Παλάς, Faistós Palás) is a fast, mixed-use vessel operated by the Greek company Minoan Lines. Built from 2001 to 2002 at the Fincantieri shipyard in Sestri Ponente, near Genoa, it was originally named Europa Palace (Greek: Ευρώπη Παλάς, Evrópi Palás). It entered service in May 2002 initially operating on routes between Greece and Italy, it was subsequently chartered in 2012 by the Italian company Tirrenia, which used it between mainland Italy and Sardinia under the name Amsicora. Returning to the Minoan fleet in 2018, it was assigned to the Piraeus - Crete route, first under the name Mykonos Palace and then Festos Palace from 2020.

== History ==
=== Origins and construction ===
Since the second half of the 1990s, the Greek companies Minoan Lines and Superfast Ferries have been in fierce competition on the routes between Greece and Italy. Superfast had indeed revolutionized this service as early as 1995 by putting into service two state-of-the-art car ferries, combining the size and comfort of a classic ferry with a high speed close to that of a high-speed ship, which immediately met with significant success.

In 1998, Minoan Lines announced a major fleet renewal program worth $900 million. Seven ships were planned for delivery by 2002; two were intended to serve the Piraeus - Crete route, while the other five would operate in the Adriatic. The Adriatic ships were divided into two series: one focused on freight transport and the other on passenger transport.

Named Olympia Palace and Europa Palace, the future ships are designed similarly to their sister ships, Knossos Palace and Festos Palace, intended for operation in the Aegean Sea. They share the same dimensions and a very similar appearance. The only difference lies in the configuration of the garage, designed to carry a larger cargo capacity than their predecessors. Their propulsion system is the same as their predecessors, allowing them to reach speeds of 29 knots.

Built by the Italian company Fincantieri on the Sestri Ponente site, in the suburbs of Genoa, the Europa Palace was launched on October 26, 2001. After finishing, it was delivered to Minoan Lines on May 10, 2002.

=== Service ===
Following a public presentation in Heraklion on May 12, the Europa Palace was opened on May 14, 2002, between Patras, Igoumenitsa and Ancona. From 2006 onwards, its port of arrival in Italy was changed to Venice.

Between February and March 2011, the ship was chartered to evacuate the Libyan population threatened by the civil war.To this end, it made two voyages between Benghazi and Latakia in Syria, then stopped in Limassol, Cyprus, before returning to Patras. It subsequently resumed its regular sailings to Italy.

Due to the economic crisis leading to a decrease in the number of passengers between Greece and Italy, Minoan Lines decided to close the Venice route in 2012. The Europa Palace and its sister ship were then chartered by the Italian company Tirrenia from July.

The ship arrived at the Palumbo shipyards in Messina on July 19 in order to undergo some modifications in preparation for its new assignment. The Tirrenia logos are painted in blue on its hull and funnel, and the ship is renamed Amsicora.It also exchanges the Greek flag for the Italian flag.

The Amsicora begins its rotations on behalf of Tirrenia in August 2012 between Civitavecchia, Arbatax, and Cagliari, in Sardinia. It replaces the former Tirrenia ships on this route, along with its sister ship, renamed Bonaria. Their speed reduces the crossing time to 11 hours instead of the previous 15–16 hours. For profitability reasons, their cruising speed is set at 22 knots. Operating these ships at full power on these less busy routes would indeed result in losses for the company.

When the charter expires on January 12, 2013, the Amsicora sailed for a time between Livorno and Palermo in Sicily on behalf of Grimaldi Lines before finally being returned to Minoan Lines on June 16. Its twin will join the fleet of Grimaldi Lines, the parent company of Minoan.

Reinstated to the Minoan Lines fleet, the ship was renamed Mykonos Palace and returned to the Greek flag. It then began a second career for its original owner, this time operating between Piraeus and Crete.

During its technical stop, carried out in Malta at the Palumbo shipyards in Valletta. In February 2019, the ship is the first Minoan Lines vessel to be fitted with exhaust gas scrubbers, commonly known as scrubbers, aimed at reducing its sulfur emissions. The work involves minor modifications to the funnel, which is raised to allow the installation of the device. On February 9, 2020, the ship is renamed Festos Palace. It takes over the name previously held by another Minoan Lines ship, which is renamed Kydon Palace.

== Facilities ==
The Festos Palace has 10 decks. Although the ship actually spans 12 decks, one is missing at the car deck level to allow the ship to carry cargo. Passenger areas occupy decks 9 through 7. Decks 2, 3, and 5 are dedicated to car decks.

=== Common areas ===
The Festos Palace has comfortable facilities for passengers, most of which are located on deck 7. The ship has two dining areas, three bars including an outdoor one with a swimming pool, and a shopping arcade.

=== Cabins ===
The Festos Palace has 190 cabins, mostly located on deck 8. They are generally equipped with two to four berths and a bathroom with shower, toilet, and sink. There is also a lounge with 108 seats.

== Features ==
The Festos Palace is 214 meters long and 26.40 meters wide, with a gross tonnage of 36,825 GT. The ship has a passenger capacity of 1,900 and features a garage with space for 660 vehicles and 140 trailers spread over four levels. The garage is accessible via two ramp doors located at the stern. Propulsion is provided by four Wärtsilä 16V46C diesel engines, producing a combined output of 62,520 kW (83,840 hp) , driving two controllable-pitch propellers, giving the vessel a top speed of 29.5 knots. The Festos Palace carries six large, enclosed lifeboats, three located on each side amidships. These are complemented by a rigid inflatable boat. In addition to these primary lifeboats, the ship is equipped with several liferafts that automatically deploy upon contact with water. The ship is equipped with two bow thrusters to facilitate docking and undocking maneuvers, as well as two stern thrusters. Since 2019, the Festos Palace has been equipped with scrubbers, exhaust gas cleaning devices that reduce sulfur emissions.

== Routes served ==
From 2002 to 2012, the Europa Palace operated the route between Greece and Italy for Minoan Lines. Initially on the Patras - Igoumenitsa - Ancona route, and then from 2006 onwards on the Patras - Igoumenitsa - Venice route. It occasionally sailed between Piraeus and Heraklion in Crete, replacing the ships usually assigned to the route.

From 2012 to 2018, the ship was used for crossings between mainland Italy and Sardinia on the Civitavecchia - Arbatax - Cagliari route.

Since 2018, it has served Minoan Lines routes between Piraeus and Crete such as Piraeus - Heraklion or Piraeus - Chania. In 2024 a stop in Milos was added on the Piraeus - Herakleion and back route.
