= Moby Tommy =

Cruise ferry built in South Korea

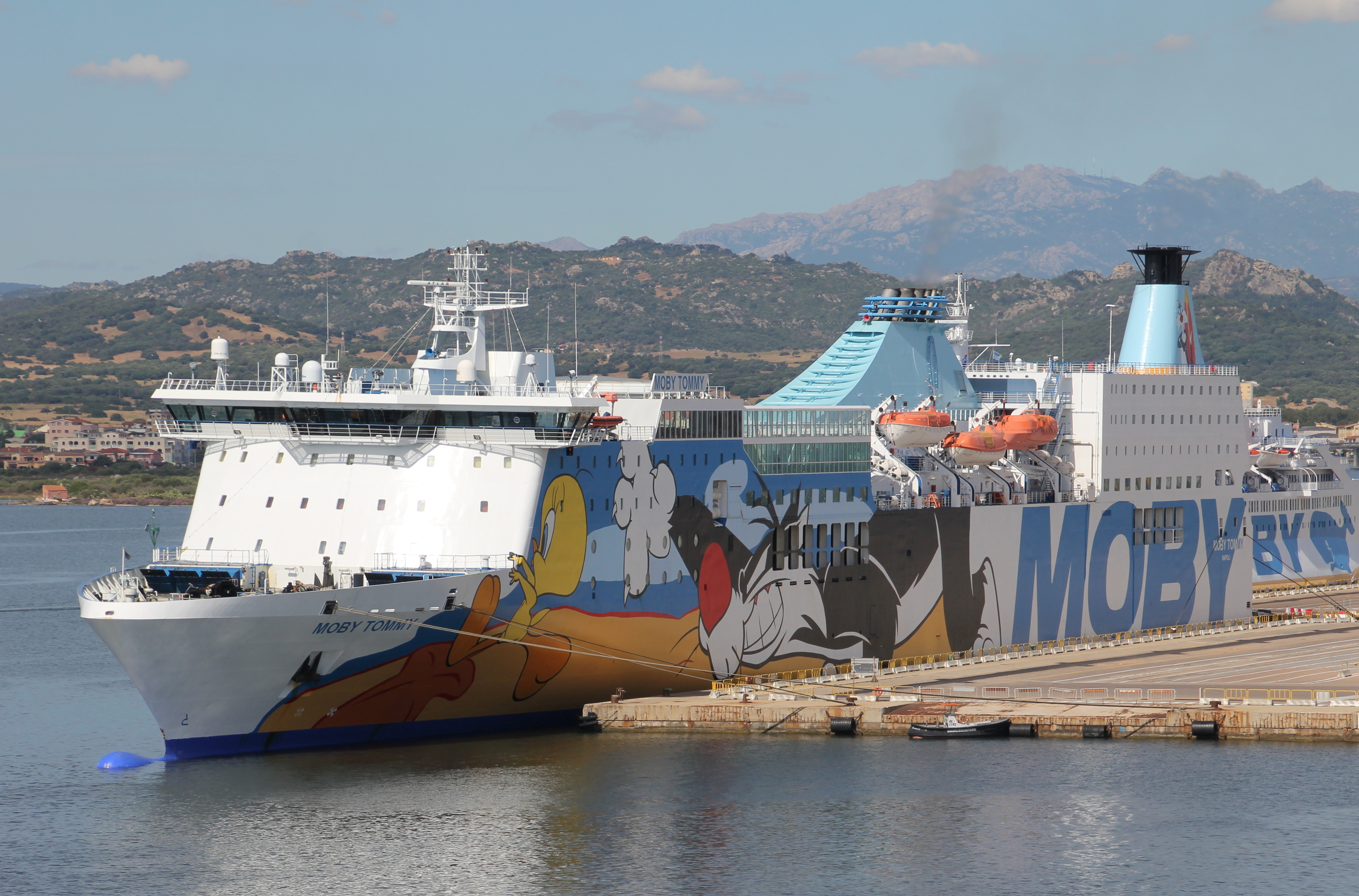
- Moby Tommy in Olbia

History
- Name: (2001–2002): Ariadne; (2002–2006): Ariadne Palace; (2006–present): Moby Tommy
- Owner: (2002–2006): Minoan Lines; (2006–present): Moby Lines / Onorato Armatori
- Operator: (2002–2006): Minoan Lines; (2006–present): Moby Lines; (2012 charter): TTT Lines; (2016 charter): Tirrenia
- Port of registry: (2002–2006): Heraklion, Greece; (2006–present): Naples, Italy
- Route: Livorno / Piombino / Civitavecchia – Olbia; Former: Venice / Ancona – Igoumenitsa – Patras
- Ordered: 1999
- Builder: Samsung Heavy Industries; Geoje, South Korea
- Yard number: 1281
- Laid down: 28 May 2001
- Launched: 18 August 2001
- Completed: 9 October 2002
- Acquired: 9 October 2002 (by Minoan Lines) August 2006 (by Moby Lines)
- Maiden voyage: November 2002
- In service: 2002
- Identification: IMO number: 9221310; Call sign: ICCS; MMSI number: 247186700
- Status: In service

General characteristics
- Class & type: Samsung 212m Fast Cruise Ferry
- Tonnage: 32,302 GT; 6,075 DWT
- Length: 212.00 m (695 ft 6 in)
- Beam: 25.00 m (82 ft 0 in)
- Draught: 6.60 m (21 ft 8 in)
- Decks: 10
- Ramps: Stern vehicle loading ramps
- Ice class: 1A
- Installed power: 4 × Wärtsilä 12V46C diesel engines (total 50,400 kW / 67,587 hp)
- Propulsion: 2 × controllable pitch propellers
- Speed: 31.5 knots (58.3 km/h; 36.2 mph) (max) / 28.0 knots (51.9 km/h; 32.2 mph) (service)
- Capacity: 2,200 passengers (500 beds in cabins, reserved recliners); 1,000 cars / 2,000 lane metres for vehicles
- Crew: 80

Moby Tommy is a mixed passenger-cargo vessel belonging to the Italian company Moby Lines. Built between 2001 and 2002 by the South Korean shipyard Samsung Heavy Industries in Geoje for the Greek company Minoan Lines under the name Ariadne Palace (Αριάδνη Παλάς, Ariádni Palás), it entered service in November 2002 between Greece and Italy. Sold in 2006 to Moby Lines, it was renamed Moby Tommy and assigned from May 2007 between mainland Italy and Sardinia. From 2017 to 2024, it operated under the Tirrenia banner, a sister brand of Moby. Since 2024, the ship has returned to the Genoa shipyard for a technical overhaul, to be repainted in Moby Lines colors.

== History ==
=== Origins and construction ===
Since the second half of the 1990s, the Greek companies Minoan Lines and Superfast Ferries have been in fierce competition on the routes between Greece and Italy. Superfast had indeed revolutionized this service as early as 1995 by putting into service two state-of-the-art car ferries, combining the size and comfort of a classic ferry with a high speed close to that of a high-speed ship, which immediately met with significant success.

To protect itself against the arrival of Superfast, Minoan had also commissioned a new ship, the Aretousa, which also entered service in 1995. But despite its slightly larger dimensions, its speed proved to be lower than that of its competitors. This was rectified, however, with the commissioning of two improved sister ships, the Ikarus in 1997 and the Pasiphae in 1998, capable of reaching speeds equivalent to those of Superfast's vessels. Superfast responded with two new car ferries in 1998 and the announcement of plans to build more units in the short term.

Thus, as early as 1998, Minoan Lines announced a major fleet renewal program worth $900 million. Seven ships were planned for delivery by 2002: two to serve the Piraeus - Crete route, and the other five to operate in the Adriatic. The Adriatic ships were divided into two series: the first focused on passenger transport and the second on freight. The construction of these latter ships, named Prometheus, Oceanus, and Ariadne after the Greek mythological figures Prometheus, Oceanus, and Ariadne, was entrusted to the South Korean shipyard Samsung Heavy Industries.

Their design is primarily geared towards freight transport; thus, the sister ships feature a spacious, two-level garage specifically designed for trailers. Despite this, the passenger facilities offer a high level of comfort, including a bar, a restaurant, an outdoor swimming pool, and approximately one hundred cabins with private bathrooms. These vessels are designed to cruise at speeds exceeding 30 knots, and their propulsion systems are among the most sophisticated in the world. Finally, they are relatively large, measuring 212 meters in length and 25 meters in width.

The last ship in the series, the Ariadne, was laid down on 28 May 2001 and launched was launched on 18 August. Identical in design to its predecessors, it nevertheless benefits from an addition compared to them with the fitting out of extra cabins at the rear. After more than a year of finishing work, it was delivered to Minoan Lines on 9 October 2002.

=== Service ===
==== Minoan Lines (2002-2006) ====
Shortly after its delivery, the Ariadne left South Korea for the Mediterranean. Upon arrival in Greece, it was presented to the public in Heraklion on 26 October. It then began its commercial career on 14 November 2002 on the Patras – Igoumenítsa – Venice line.

Despite their performance, the construction of these ships caused Minoan Lines significant debt, so much so that the Prometheus and the Oceanus were sold barely three years after entering service. Initially retained, the Ariadne Palace was in turn decommissioned in 2006 and sold in September to the Italian company Moby Lines. Reassigned in August to the Patras-Igoumenitsa- Ancona route, it completed its final voyage for Minoan Lines on 28 November.

==== Moby Lines (since 2006) ====
Received in Perama by its new owner, the ship was renamed Moby Tommy on 19 December 2006. After leaving Greece on 21 November to reach Italy, it arrived in Genoa three days later and entered the shipyards to undergo some renovations. In addition to refurbishing the existing spaces, a new bar was added on deck 7 and the ship was repainted in Moby's colors, including a livery featuring characters from Looney Tunes.

Following the modifications, the Moby Tommy entered service in the month of May 2007 between mainland Italy and Sardinia.

From 9 March to 24 April 2012, the ship is chartered by TTT Lines, which operates it between Naples and Trapani in Sicily. At the end of the summer season, it was planned that the car ferry would join the fleet of Tirrenia, recently acquired by Moby's parent company, to replace the ferry Toscana. In anticipation of this, the Moby and Tirrenia logos appeared simultaneously on the ship's hull. However, the ship returned to the Moby Lines livery in January 2013 in order to address a demand for freight on Sardinian lines following the bankruptcy of the shipowner Armamento Sardo.

In February 2016, the ship joins the Palumbo shipyards in Messina, Sicily, to benefit from a major refit consisting in particular of the addition of a two-deck block at the rear as well as the removal of part of the upper garage at the front to allow the fitting out of new cabins.

On 26 August 2020 at around 5 p.m., while carrying out its docking maneuver in Olbia, the ship collided with the quay, causing minor damage.

On 5 June 2025, the Moby Tommy arrived in the port of Ajaccio, for its first stop in the imperial city.

== Accidents and Incidents ==
On the morning of 29 June 2022, while the Moby Tommy was arriving in Genoa from Porto Torres, an engineer officer was crushed by one of the watertight doors near the engine room, suffering serious injuries to the pelvis and skull. The officer was saved by two colleagues and the on-board doctor and transported in red code to the San Martino hospital . An investigation into the dynamics of the accident was opened by the Public Prosecutor's Office for negligent injuries and the captain and the chief engineer were included in the register of suspects. No anomalies were found in the functioning of the watertight doors and consequently the ferry was not seized.

On the morning of 2 January 2026, during docking maneuvers in Civitavecchia with strong gusts of south-westerly wind, the ferry collided with the port side of the quay of the Lazio port, causing a gash in the hull of about ten meters.

== Facilities ==
In its original configuration, the Moby Tommy had 8 decks. Although the ship actually spanned 10 decks, two were absent at the car deck level to allow the ship to carry cargo. Passenger accommodations occupied decks 5, 6, and 7, and decks 2, 3, and 4 were dedicated to car decks.

Since 2016, the ship has expanded to 10 decks due to the addition of new cabins in place of the forward section of the car deck, as well as the addition of a block at the stern. With the creation of a new deck between car deck 4 and deck 5, the numbering of the upper decks has been shifted.

=== Common areas ===
Originally, the communal facilities of the Ariadne Palace were primarily located on deck 5. The ship featured a lounge bar, an à la carte restaurant, a self-service restaurant, a shopping arcade, and a casino. An outdoor pool with a lido bar was also located on deck 6, and an ice cream parlor was situated on deck 7.

Located mostly on deck 6 (formerly designated as deck 5), the facilities are currently organized as follows:

- Show Lounge , the bar-lounge with a dance floor located at the rear;
- Sport Bar , a bar broadcasting sporting events located at the front on deck 7;
- Achille Onorato , à la carte restaurant located towards the middle;
- Mascalzone Latino , self-service located at the front on the port side;
- Admiral Pub , an English-style bar characterized by its very traditional wood-paneled decor;

In addition to these facilities, the ship has a lounge, a shop and a children's playroom.

=== Cabins ===
Originally, the Moby Tommy had 180 internal and external cabins located on decks 5 and 6, both forward and aft. Most cabins had two to four berths, and some had a double bed. All had en-suite facilities including a shower, toilet, and sink. A lounge with approximately 100 seats was also located aft on deck 5. During refits carried out by Moby in 2016, about 100 new cabins were added aft and forward, replacing part of the car deck, bringing the total number of cabins to 300.

== Features ==
The Moby Tommy is 212 meters long and 25 meters wide. Its original tonnage was 28,007 GT, which was increased to 32,203 GT in 2007 and then to 32,302 GT in 2016. The ship could initially accommodate 1,300 passengers and approximately 1,000 vehicles or 122 trailers in its garage. Since 2007, its capacity has been 2,200 passengers. The garage is accessible via two ramp doors located at the stern. A third, smaller door, also located at the stern, allows foot passengers to directly access the ship's reception area on deck 5. The Moby Tommy is powered by four Wärtsilä 12V46C diesel engines, producing 49,680 kW of power and driving two propellers, propelling the vessel to a speed of 30.5 knots, making it one of the fastest ships in its class. The ship carries two large lifeboats, four medium-sized lifeboats, and a rigid inflatable rescue boat, as well as several life rafts. It is also equipped with two bow thrusters, a stern thruster, and a roll stabilizer.

== Routes served ==
For Minoan Lines, the ship operated the service between Greece and Italy from 2002 to 2006 on the Patras - Igoumenitsa - Venice route, then the Patras - Igoumenitsa - Ancona route from August to November 2006.

Since 2007, the ship has been assigned to the routes between the Italian mainland and Sardinia, in particular Piombino - Olbia and Civitavecchia - Olbia, initially under the colors of Moby Lines and then Tirrenia from 2017. During the summer of 2022, it is positioned between Genoa and Porto Torres.

== Sister ships ==
- Mega Express Three
- Zeus Palace
