= AF Mia =

Italian ferry

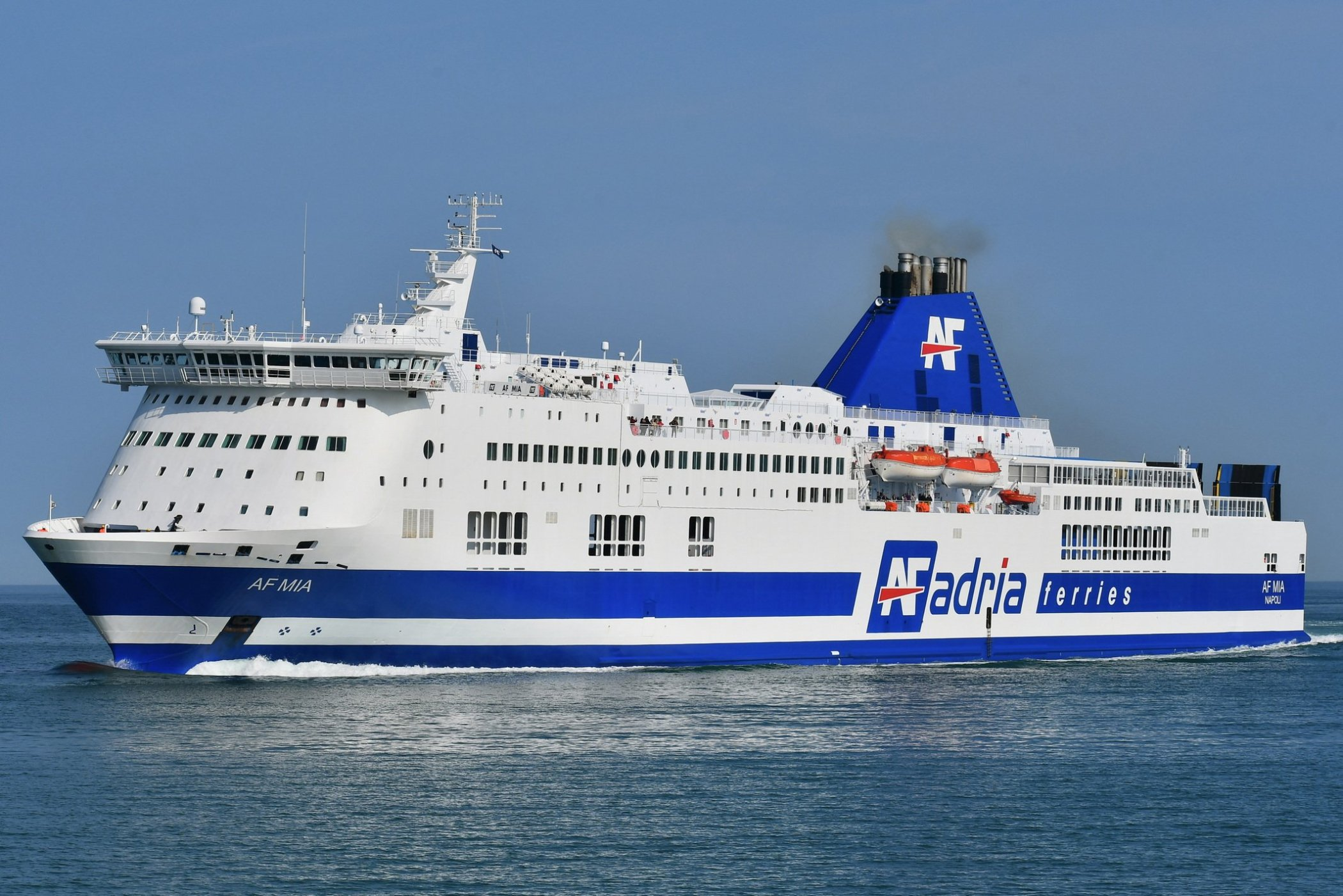
- AF Mia in Ancona

History
- Name: (1997–2001): Ikarus; (2001–2016): Ikarus Palace; (2016–2023): Cruise Smeralda; (2023–present): AF Mia
- Owner: (1997–2016): Minoan Lines; (2016–2023): Grimaldi Group; (2023–present): Adria Ferries S.p.A.
- Operator: (1997–2016): Minoan Lines; (2016–2023): Grimaldi Lines; (2023–present): Adria Ferries
- Port of registry: (1997–2016): Heraklion, Greece; (2016–2023): Palermo, Italy; (2023–present): Naples, Italy
- Route: Ancona – Durrës; Former: Patras – Igoumenitsa – Corfu – Venice / Ancona; Former: Livorno / Savona – Barcelona – Tanger Med
- Ordered: 1995
- Builder: Fosen Mekaniske Verksteder A/S (Rissa, Norway); Bruce Shipyard (Landskrona, Sweden; hull)
- Yard number: 66 / 362
- Laid down: 1997
- Launched: 5 May 1997
- Completed: December 1997
- Acquired: December 1997 (as Ikarus) 2016 (by Grimaldi Lines) October 2023 (by Adria Ferries)
- Maiden voyage: December 1997
- In service: 1997
- Identification: IMO number: 9144811; Call sign: IBNQ; MMSI number: 247343200
- Status: In service

General characteristics
- Class & type: Fosen Fast Cruise Ferry (Ikarus Class)
- Tonnage: 29,968 GT; 5,150 DWT
- Length: 200.65 m (658 ft 4 in)
- Beam: 25.80 m (84 ft 8 in)
- Draught: 6.80 m (22 ft 4 in)
- Decks: 9
- Ramps: Two vehicle loading ramps, one passenger ramp
- Installed power: 4 × MAN-B&W 8L58/64 diesel engines (total 44,480 kW / 59,650 hp)
- Propulsion: 2 × KaMeWa controllable pitch propellers
- Speed: 27.0 knots (50.0 km/h; 31.1 mph) (max) / 24.0 knots (44.4 km/h; 27.6 mph) (service)
- Capacity: 1,528 passengers (197 cabins / 713 beds, 181 armchairs); 1,950 lane metres for vehicles (~800 cars)
- Crew: 80

AF Mia is a RO/PAX ferry operated and owned by Adria Ferries. The ship was built as Ikarus in Fosen Mek Verksteder A/S, Norway for Minoan Lines in 1997, and later renamed Ikarus Palace. She has a sister ship Jean Nicoli now with Corsica Linea.

== Minoan Lines Career ==
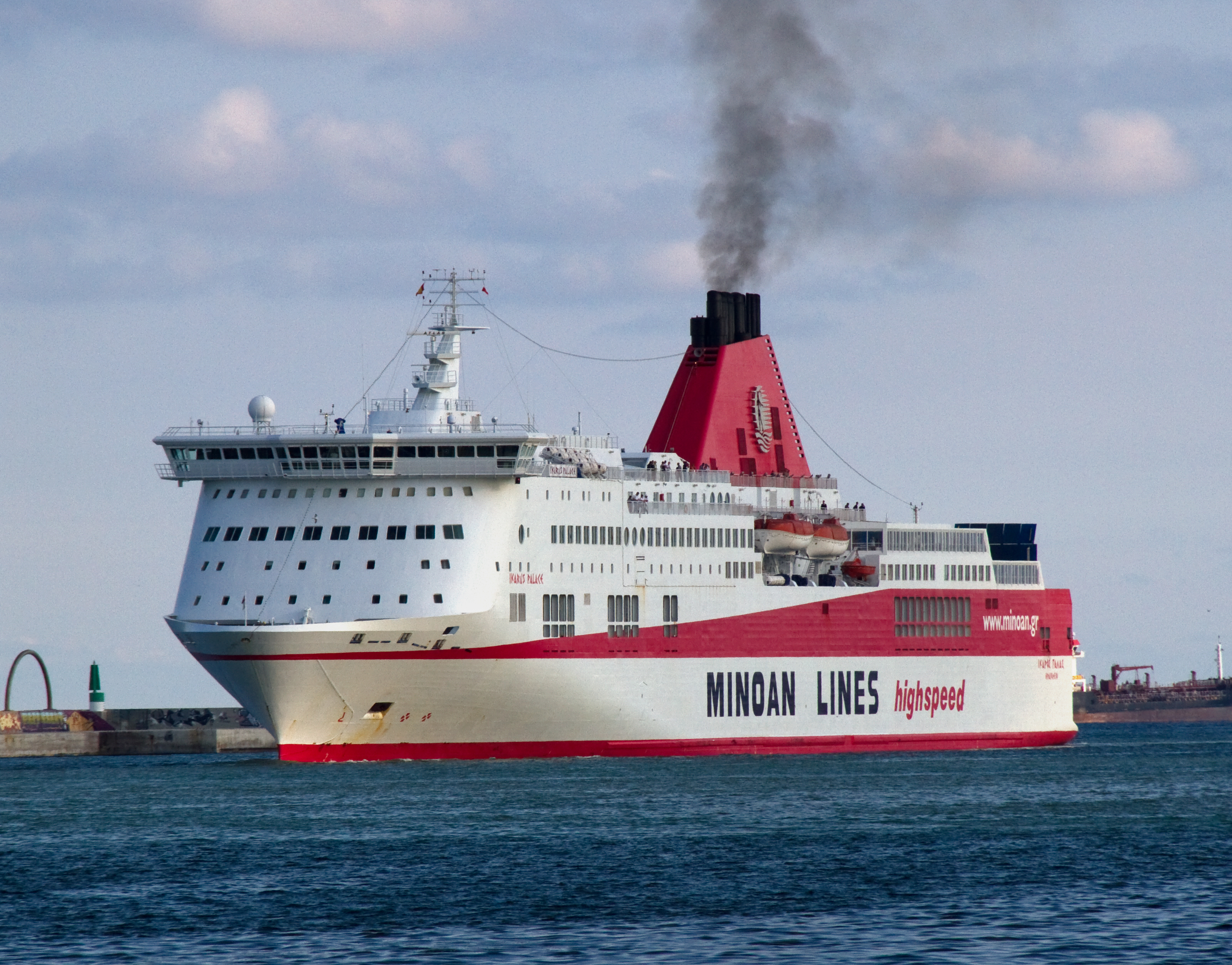
Ikarus Palace

Ikarus made her career for Minoan Lines in 1997 and worked the Patras-Igoumenitsa-Corfu-Venice route for many years with her sister ship Pasiphae. In 2001 both ships were renamed Ikarus Palace and Pasiphae Palace respectively. They worked together for many years on the same route until Pasiphae Palace was sold to SNCM and renamed Jean Nicoli. Ikarus Palace also made worked the Piraeus-Heraklion route replacing another ship of her company. After the arrivals of the newest ships MS Cruise Europa and MS Cruise Olympia, Ikarus Palace was laid-up in Patras and then joined the Patras-Igoumenitsa–Ancona route and subsequently replacing HSF Knossos Palace and HSF Kydon Palace on Piraeus-Heraklion route.

== Chartered to Grimaldi Lines ==
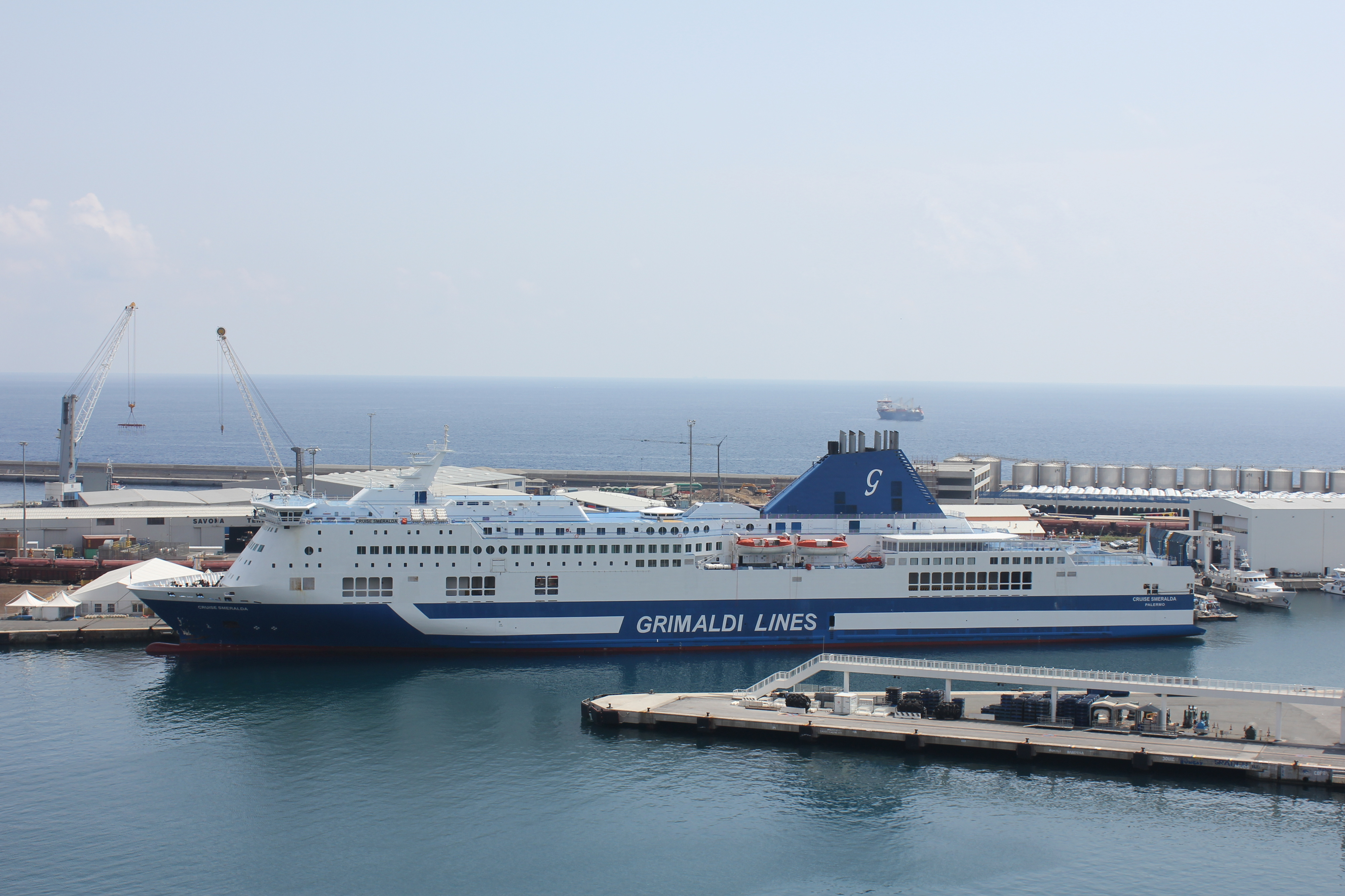
Cruise Smeralda in Savona in 2018

Ikarus Palace then chartered for Grimaldi Lines. The ship when chartered for Grimaldi Lines began the Livorno–Barcelona–Tangier route. The ship also came many times in Greece to replace other ships of her company. The ship made her last route Patras–Igoumenitsa–Ancona route in 2016 and then sold to Grimaldi Lines and named Cruise Smeralda.

== Sold to Adria Ferries ==
Cruise Smeralda was sold to Adria Ferries in 2023 and was renamed AF Mia.

== Route ==
AF Mia currently operates in the following route between Italy and Albania:

- Ancona–Durrës
