= Minoan Lines =

Greek passenger ferry company

- Traded as: Athex: MINOA
- Industry: Shipping; Transport
- Founded: May 25, 1972; 54 years ago
- Headquarters: Heraklion, Greece
- Area served: Aegean Sea
- Key people: Emanuele Grimaldi (Chairman); Loukas Sigalas (CEO)
- Services: Passenger transportation; Freight transportation
- Revenue: €57.45 million (2020)
- Operating income: €(14.60) million (2020)
- Net income: €(15.39) million (2020)
- Total assets: €280.62 million (2020)
- Total equity: €255.17 million (2020)
- Owner: Grimaldi Group (100%)
- Number of employees: 415 (2020)
- Website: www.minoan.gr

Minoan Lines is one of the largest passenger ferry companies in Europe, and one of the dominant passenger ferry companies in Greece, sailing between Piraeus and Crete and, in the Adriatic Sea, between Patras and various Italian ports. The company was founded in May 1972 by Georgios Vardiampasis and Georgios Kegiadakis, according to former Minoan Lines president Konstantinos Klironomos. Since 2008 Grimaldi's Compagnia di Navigazione SpA owns and controls 95.9 of the stock of Minoan Lines.

The company's logo is derived from The Lily Prince fresco at Knossos.

== History ==
2003

- The cooperation between Minoan and Grimaldi ended, with only the MS Oceanus deployed on the Italy-Tunisia route.
- The MS Oceanus was renamed Ariadne Palace I and sold to Corsica Ferries.
- MS Prometheus was sold to Caronte Shipping, an Italian shipping company.

2004

- Minoan decided to focus solely on the shipping sector and sold its stake in Aegean Airlines.

2005

- Attica Group acquired 10.23% of the share capital of Minoan, reaching an 11.61% stake in the company.
- Minoan sold its 18% stake in Forthnet to Intracom.

2006

- The Ariadne Palace was sold to Moby Lines. All three vessels from the Samsung shipyard were sold to other companies.
- Minoan Lines was Passenger Line of the Year according to Lloyd's List.

2007

- In February, Attica Group increased its stake in Minoan Lines.
- In June, Attica Group sold its entire stake in Minoan (22.2%) to Access Maritime SA, which is controlled by Mr Laskarides.
- In December, Sea Star Capital, owner of ANEK Lines, acquired a 26.05% stake in Minoan Lines from Access Maritime in a privately negotiated transaction.

2008

- In January, Sea Star Capital signed an agreement with Grimaldi's Compagnia di Navigazione SpA to sell its 26.7 percent stake in Minoan.
- In October, Compagnia di Navigazione SpA, parent company of the Grimaldi Group, raised its stake above the limit of one third of shared capital and voting rights, which triggered a mandatory bid for the rest of the shares. The offer was launched at the end of October and lasted until the end of November. During this period, Grimaldi acquired an additional 47.9% stake in Minoan Lines, raising its total stake to about 85%.

2009-10

- In January, Pasiphae Palace was sold to SNCM, and became Jean Nicoli. The replacement on the Venice - Igoumenitsa - Patras route was the Eurostar Barcelona, on loan from the parent company Grimaldi, formerly operated by Minoan under the name Prometheus. Eurostar Barcelona was renamed Zeus Palace.
- Ikarus Palace began operating on charter with Grimaldi Group on the Livorno - Barcelona - Tanger-Med route.
- In October 2009, the new Cruise Europa was delivered, followed by the sister-ship Cruise Olympia in the early summer 2010.

2011

- In January 2011 Minoan Lines cancelled the sale of its 33.35% stake in Hellenic Seaways to ANEK and tried to find a new buyer for it.

2012

- The year began with a significant loss for the company - the closure of the Venice route. The fate of the ships that operated on this line remained uncertain until the end of July 2012, when Europa Palace joined Cruise Europa and Cruise Olympia on the Ancona route. Meanwhile, Olympia Palace was laid up in Perama. Despite the rumored reopening of the Piraeus - Chania route, both ships were then chartered to CIN, owner of the recently privatized Tirrenia di Navigazione, and used on the Cagliari - Arbatax - Civitavecchia route. Europe Palace was renamed Amsicora, and "Olympia Palace" became Bonaria. Both ships underwent a partial refit at Messina, and changed their ports of registry from Heraklion to Cagliari, and their flags from Greek to Italian.
- At the end of 2012 the daily Ancona - Igoumenitsa - Patras route was extended to call at Trieste thrice weekly. The route was operated by Cruise Europa and Cruise Olympia. A third ship, Europalink, was also added to the route in order to increase load capacity. The ship was previously operated by another Grimaldi Group company, Finnlines, but was changed flags from Swedish to Italian and operated in cooperation with Grimaldi.

2013

- On January 5, Europalink experience a failure and was forced to make an emergency stop in the port of Brindisi. Passengers and vehicles were disembarked safely and continued the journey with Grimaldi Group's Florencia. The ship was then brought from Brindisi to Messina yards for repair.

2014

- On September 21, Europalink struck rocks off Peristeres island, north east of Corfu, Greece. All 70 crew and 692 passengers were evacuated. It was later refloated and taken in to Kerkyra, Greece for repairs. Europalink was on a voyage from Patras, Greece to Ancona.

2017

- Starting with January the Adriatic line again called at the ferry port of Venice twice weekly, arriving and departing during the night hours.

2018

- Europa Palace, which was chartered to Tirrenia di Navigazione as Amsicora, returns to Minoan Lines as Mykonos Palace on the Piraeus-Chania line.
- Minoan Lines also acquires Santorini Palace, previously operated as Highspeed 7 by Hellenic Seaways, and starts serving the Heraklion-Santorini-Ios-Paros-Mykonos route.

2020

- Minoan Lines puts to her ships scrubbers Knossos Palace, Festos Palace, Mykonos Palace, Cruise Olympia, Cruise Europa and with that Minoan lines became the first company in Greece with scrubbers
- Mykonos Palace replace the ships Cruise Olympia, Cruise Europa in Patras-Igoymenitsa-Ancona route because the two Cruises put scrubbers in Malta [Piombino Shipyards]
- Festos Palace on February renamed Kydon Palace and sails Piraeus-Chania route
- Kydon Palace on 13 February replaced Mykonos Palace
- Mykonos Palace on 15 February renamed Festos Palace

2021

- Cruise Europa & Cruise Olympia were returned to Grimaldi Group.
- Cruise Bonaria replaced temporarily Cruise Olympia in the Line Patra-Ancona after the former's departure from the fleet.
- Cruise Olbia was transferred in late February from Grimaldi Group to Grimaldi Minoan Lines and renamed Europa Palace, replacing Cruise Europa in the line Patra-Ancona.
- Zeus Palace was transferred in April from Grimaldi Group to Grimaldi Minoan Lines and replaced Cruise Bonaria in the line Patra-Ancona.

== Ships ==
=== Current fleet ===
As of 19 January 2024

Ship name	Flag	Built	IMO	Callsign	Tonnage	Length	Width	Passengers	Cars	Knots	Photo
Kydon Palace	(Greece)	2001	9204568	SYNR	37,550 GT	214 m	26.4 m	1,718	665	31.5	
Knossos Palace	(Greece)	2001	9220330	SVDJ4	36,900 GT	214 m	26.4 m	2,184	735	31.5	
Festos Palace	(Greece)	2002	9220342	SVDA8	36,900 GT	214 m	26.4 m	2,184	735	31.5	

=== Future fleet ===
Ship name	Flag	Built	Tonnage	Length	Width	Passengers	Lanemeters	Knots	Photo
TBA	(Greece)	September 2028	60,000 GT	229 m	TBD	2,500	3,300	TBD	
TBA	(Greece)	September 2029	60,000 GT	229 m	TBD	2,500	3,300	TBD	

=== Former fleet ===
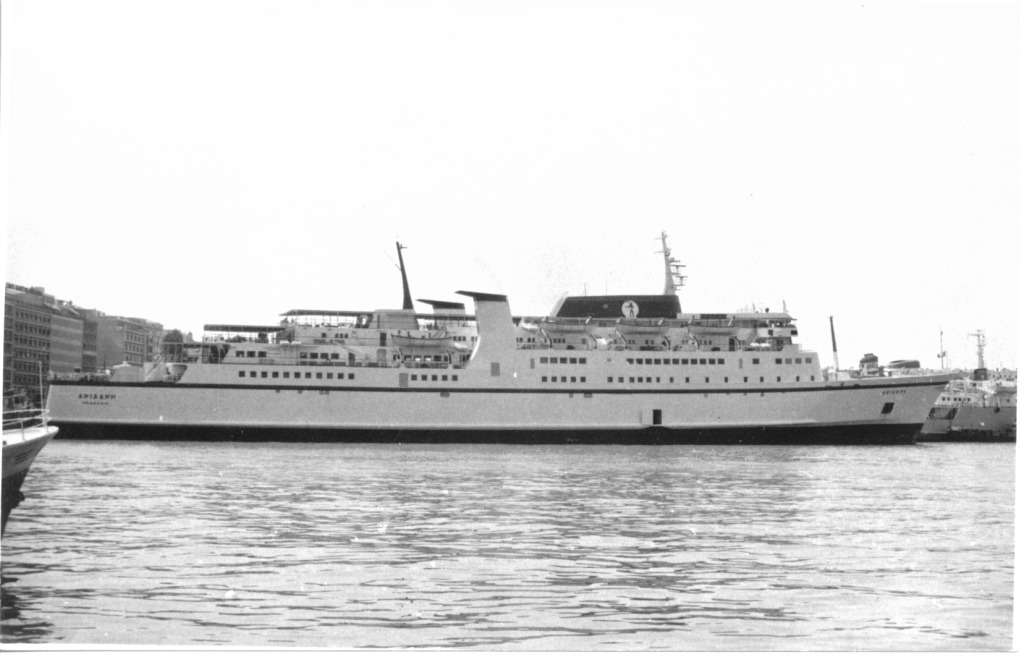
Ariadne

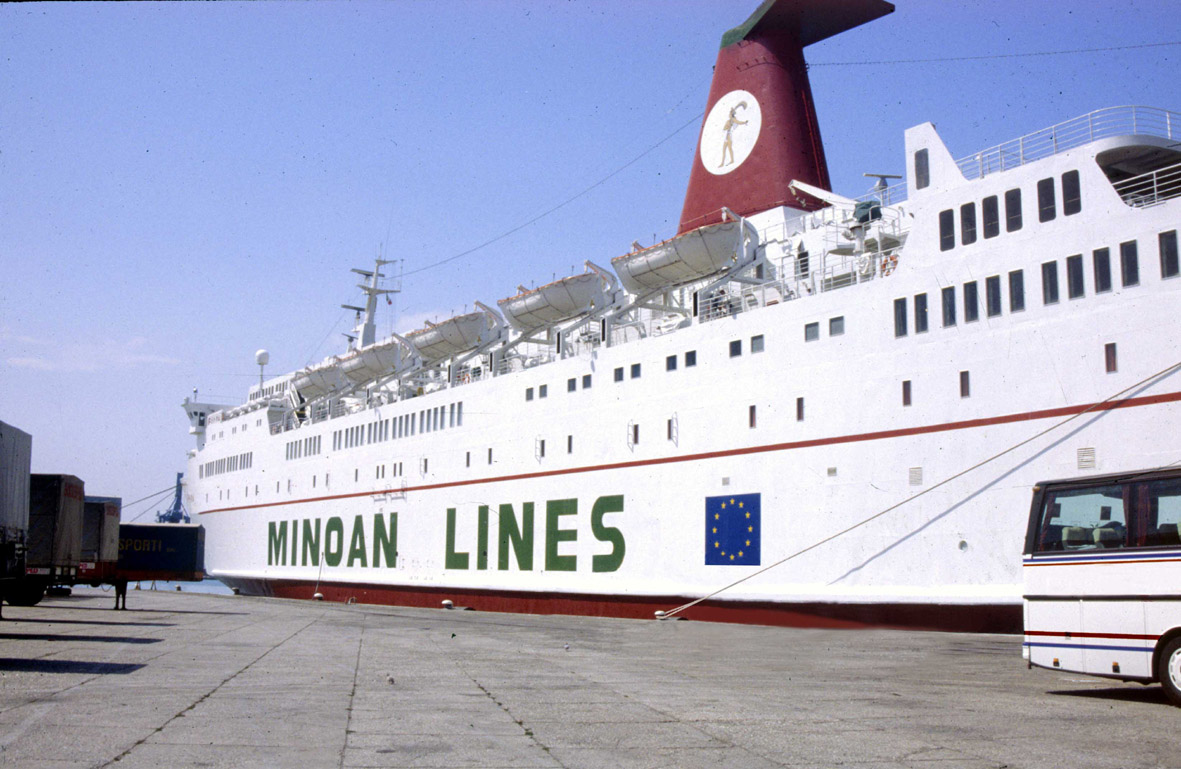
Fedra

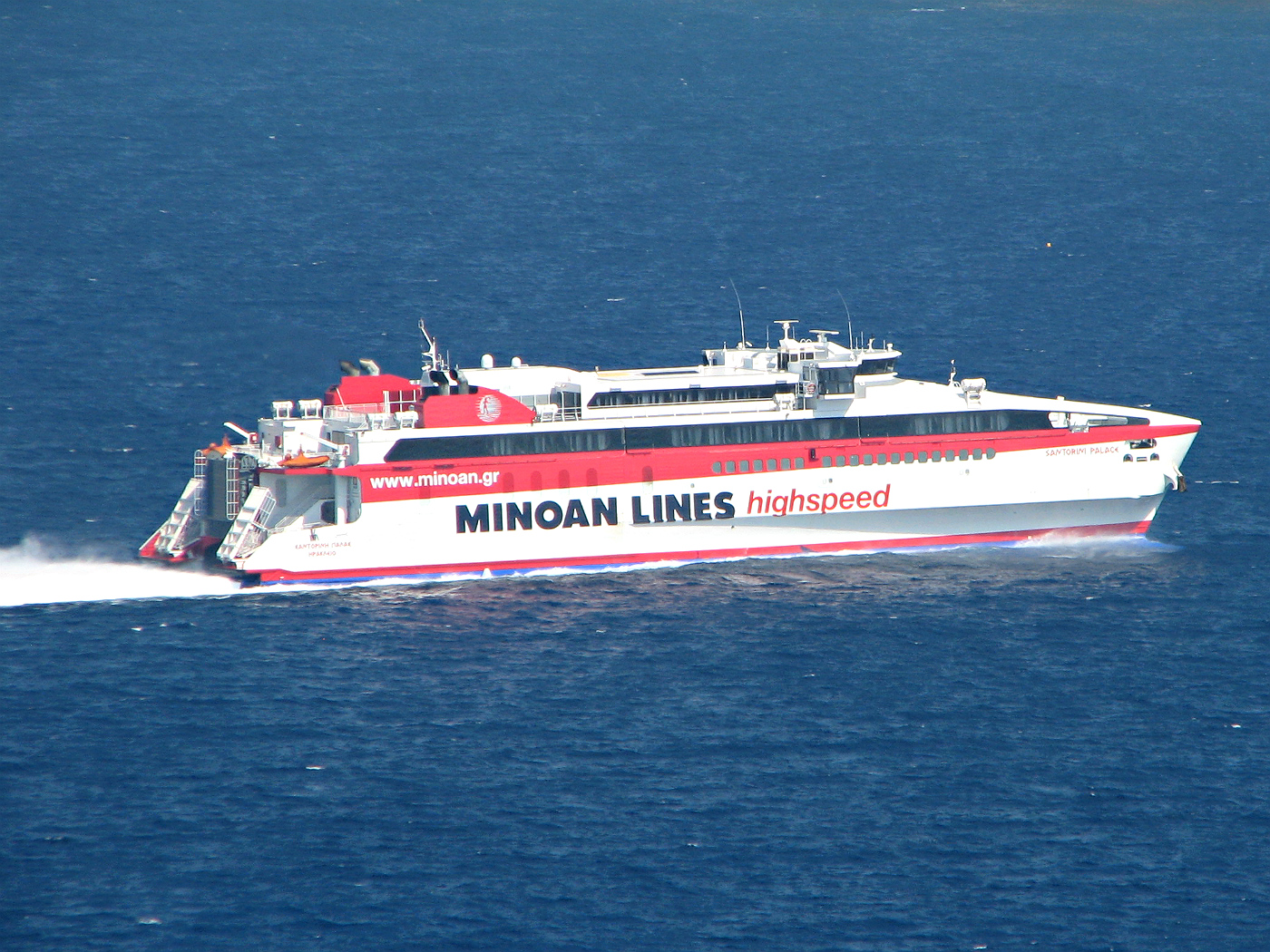
Santorini Palace

- Minos (1974–1984) scrapped in 1984
- Ariadne (1975–1999) scrapped as Diamond in 2010 at Aliaga, Turkey
- Zakros (1977–1985) scrapped in 1985
- Knossos (1978–1998) scrapped as Ancona in 2011 at Alang, India
- El Greco (1979–2002) scrapped as Zaman in 2008 at Alang, India
- Festos (1984–1998) scrapped as Sancack I in 2003 at Aliaga, Turkey
- Agia Galini (1986–2002) sank as Dayana in 2006 at Colombia
- Fedra (1987–2000) scrapped as Winner 8 in 2010 at Alang, India
- King Minos (1987–2002) scrapped as Mawadahh in 2019 at Gadani Beach, Pakistan
- Daedalus (1989–2005) scrapped as Caribbean Galaxy in 2018 at Aliaga, Turkey
- N.Kazantzakis (1989–2001) scrapped as Ropolis at Alang, India 2020.
- Erotokritos (1991–2002) scrapped as Kritos in 2011 at Alang, India
- Aretousa (1995–2002) now as Girolata for Grandi Navi Veloci since 2020
- Ikarus Palace (1997–2016) now as AF Mia for Adria Ferries since 2023
- Pasiphae Palace (1998–2009) now as Jean Nicoli for Corsica Linea since 2018
- Oceanus (2001–2002) as Ariadne Palace I (2002–2003) now as Mega Express Three for Corsica Ferries since 2004
- Prometheus (2001–2004) now as Zeus Palace for Grimaldi Lines since 2009
- Ariadne Palace (2002–2006) now as Moby Tommy for Moby Lines since 2006
- Knossos Palace (2000–2020) now as Cruise Bonaria for Grimaldi Lines since 2020
- Cruise Olympia (2010–2021) now as Cruise Sardegna for Grimaldi Lines since 2021
- Cruise Europa (2009–2021) now operating for Grimaldi Lines since 2021
- Santorini Palace (2018–2024) reported on long term charter to Seajets from January 2024.

== Routes ==
- Athens - Crete
  - Festos Palace & Knossos Palace: Piraeus - Milos - Heraklion
- Greece - Italy
  - Kydon Palace: Igoumenitsa - Brindisi

== Affiliates ==
Companies that are affiliates of Minoan Lines (larger than 10%) are outlined below.

- Minoan Agencies S.r.l. 95,00%
- Cretan Filoxenia S.A. 99,99%
- Minoan Cruises S.A. 80,28%

== Former affiliates ==
- Minoan Flying Dolphins
- Forthnet
