= Peristeres (island) =

Island in Greece

Native name: Περιστερές
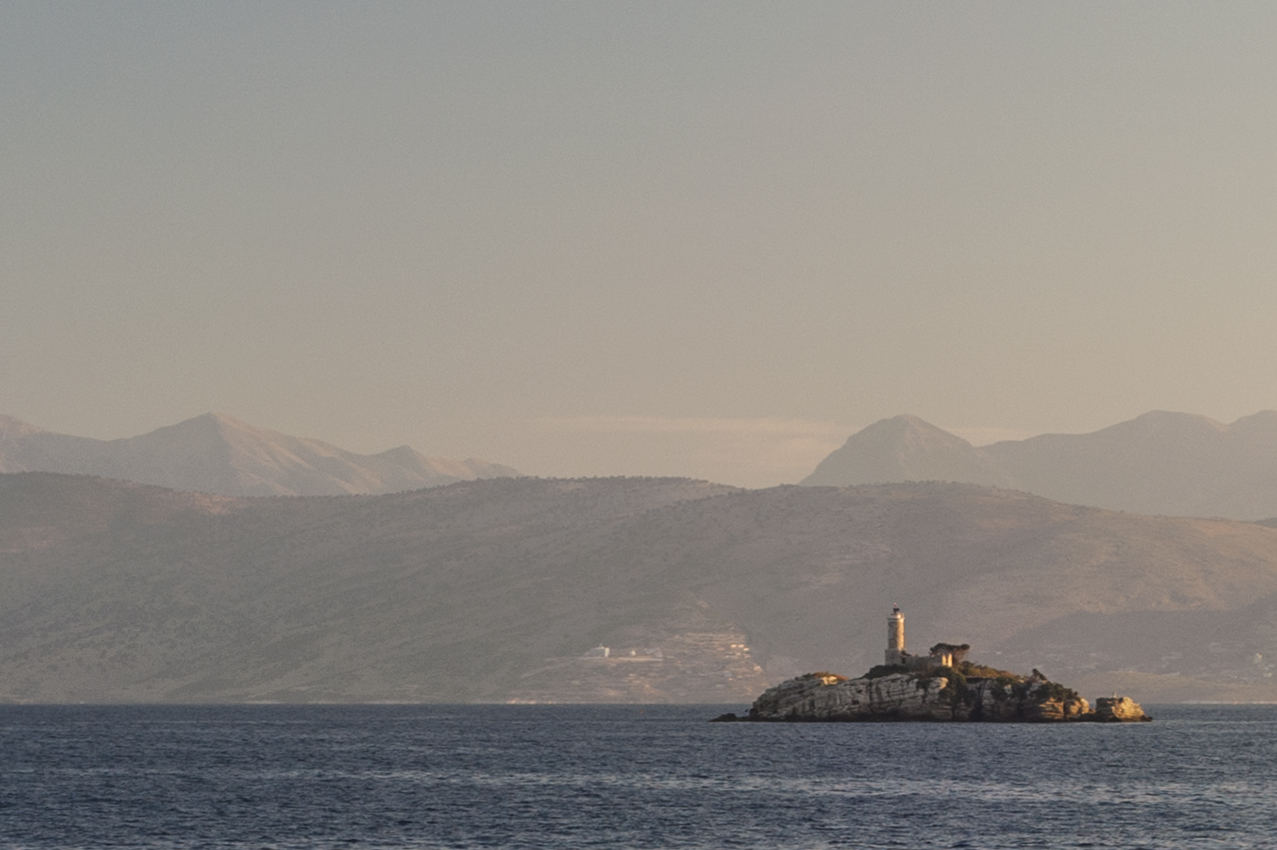
- Peristeres Island and lighthouse, Greece.
- Interactive map of Peristeres

Geography
- Coordinates: 39°47′33″N 19°57′32″E
- Highest elevation: 23.5 m (77.1 ft)

Administration
- Greece

Demographics
- Population: 1 (2011)

Peristeres (Greek: Περιστερές) is an island in Greece, to the west of Corfu, where it belongs administratively. It is the site of a lighthouse since 1826 and is inhabited by 1 person according to the Greek census of 2011.

The small island and its lighthouse are visible from the southern Albanian coastal area containing the cities of Saranda and Ksamil.
