= Moby Lines =

Italian ferry company

Moby S.p.A.
- Industry: Passenger transportation, Freight transportation
- Founded: 1959
- Headquarters: Milan, Italy
- Area served: Italy, France, Corsica, Sardinia
- Key people: Vincenzo Onorato, Chairman
- Subsidiaries: St. Peter Line; Tirrenia; Toremar
- Website: www.moby.it

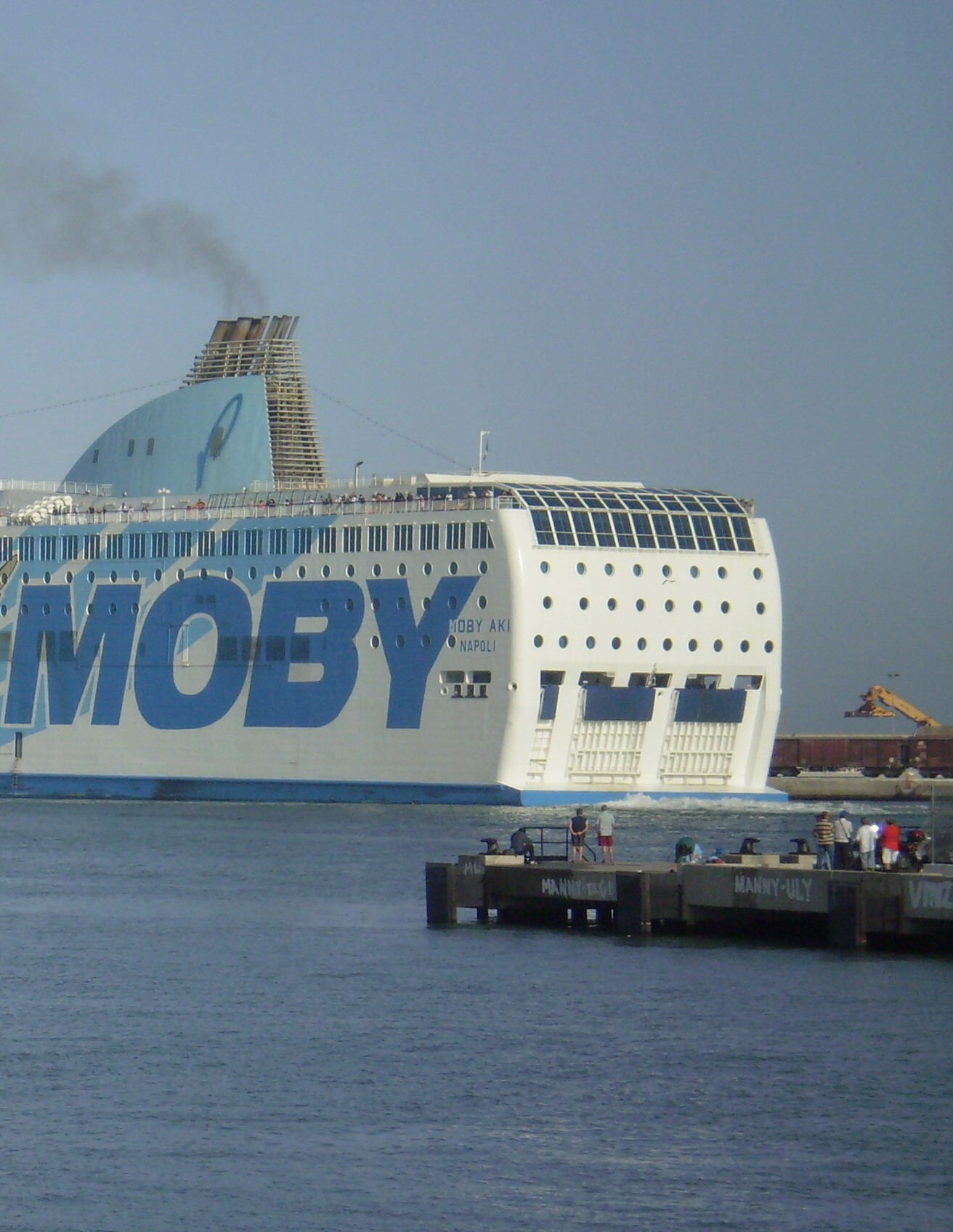
MS Moby Aki in Livorno, 2007.

Moby Lines (Moby Lines S.p.A.) is an Italian shipping company that operates ferries and cruiseferries between the Italian or French mainland and the islands of Elba, Sardinia and Corsica. The company was founded in 1959 under the name Navigazione Arcipelago Maddalenino (NAVARMA for short).

In 2006 Moby Lines purchased Lloyd Sardegna. The company uses Warner Bros. Looney Tunes characters as the external livery of its ships. Notable events include the Moby Prince disaster in 1991, which resulted in the deaths of 140 people.

== History ==
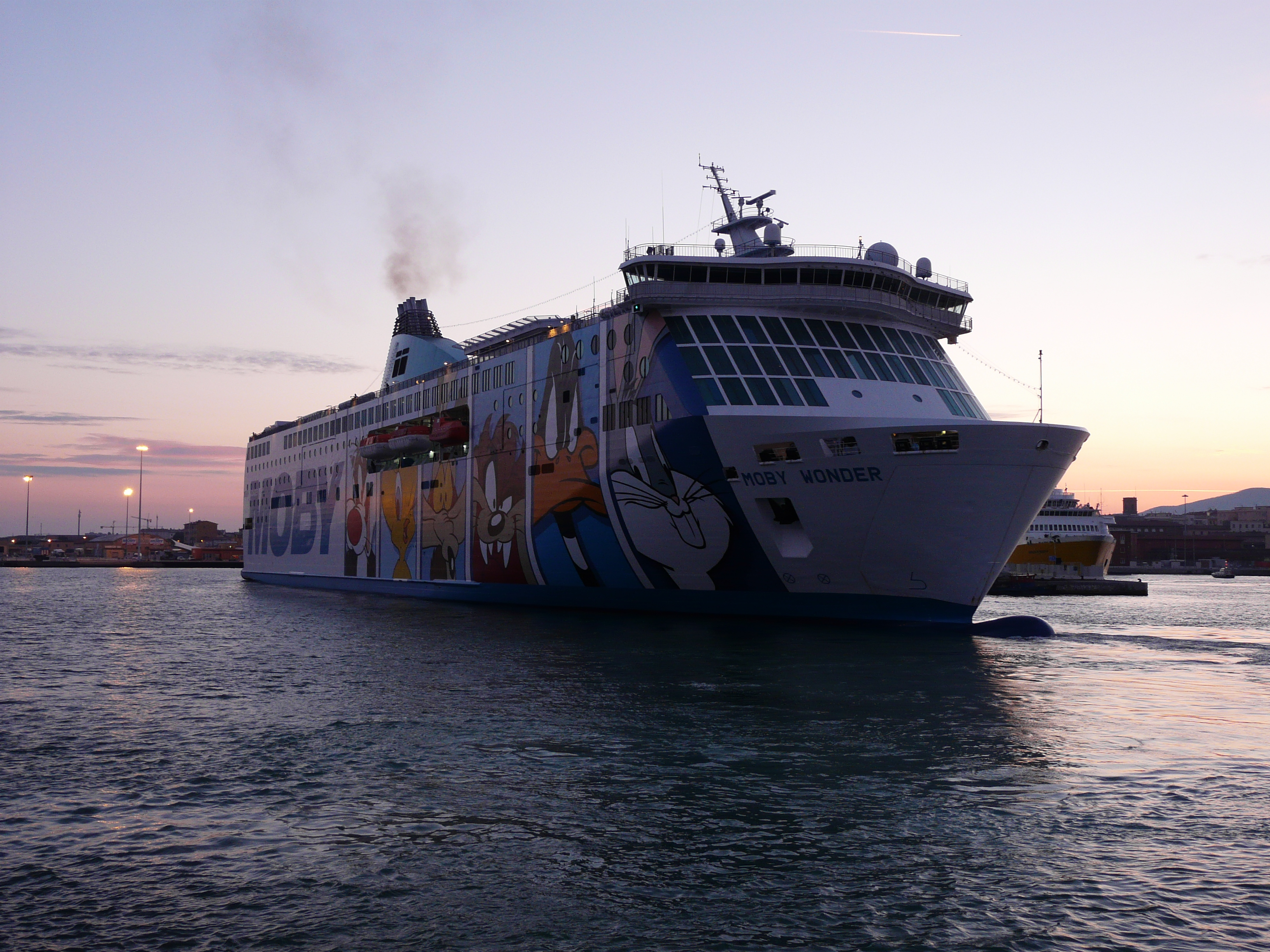
Moby Wonder in Livorno, 22 of February, 2011.

NAVARMA was founded in 1959 by Achille Onorato, and started traffic from Sardinia to the islands on coast of Sardinia with the small ferry M/S Maria Maddalena purchased from Denmark. In February 1966 NAVARMA purchased a second ferry, M/S Bonifacioo, and started service between Sardinia and Corsica. The company slowly expanded, purchasing another ferry in 1967 and taking delivery of two newbuilds in 1974 and 1981. With the larger fleet, new routes to the Italian mainland were also introduced.

In 1982 the company acquired M/S Free Enterprise II from Townsend Thoresen, renamed her M/S Moby Blu and painted her in the "blue whale" livery that later came to characterise Moby Lines (the company name still remained NAVARMA at this point). The Moby Blu was over twice the size of NAVARMA's previously largest ship. By 1988 four additional larger ferries (all with Moby-prefixed names) had joined by NAVARMA fleet and additional routes to the Italian mainland were opened.

In 1991 one of the ferries of the fleet, the Moby Prince, was involved in the worst disaster in the Italian merchant navy since World War II. This resulted in 140 deaths.

During the early 1990s NAVARMA acquired further used ferries, which replaced the Moby ferries acquired in the 1980s. During the same time "Moby Lines" was adopted as the official company name. From 1996 onwards the company fleet has grown radically with addition of new, larger and faster tonnage, including the newbuilt fast cruiseferries Moby Wonder, Moby Freedom and Moby Aki. Around 2003 Moby Lines entered an agreement with Warner Bros. to paint their vessels in liveries featuring Looney Tunes characters. However, only the larger ships have such liveries, the company's smaller ships either have similar graphics not featuring the Looney Tunes characters, or simply the Moby Lines' whale logo.

In 2020, in a departure away from Moby Lines' signature business model of acquiring vintage tonnage for its routes, it was announced that steel cutting has started for Moby Lines' two newbuild vessels on order from the Guangzhou Shipyard. These newbuilds will be 238 metres (784 feet) long and roughly 69,500 GT, and specifically designed for the 7-9 hour Livorno-Olbia ferry crossing. These newbuild twins are earmarked to replace the Moby Aki and Moby Wonder between 2022 and 2023.

== Fleet ==
=== Current Ships ===
Ship	Flag	Built	Entered service	Gross tonnage	Length	Width	Passengers	Vehicles	Knots	Image
Bunifazziu	(Italy)	1989	2025	1,640 GT	72 m	14 m	700	76	16,5	
Giraglia	(Italy)	1981	1981	2,041 GT	75 m	13 m	400	100	18	
Moby Niki	(Italy)	1974	2016	9,089 GT	118,7 m	18,5 m	1,440	373	18	
Moby Kiss	(Italy)	1975	2016	11,977 GT	115.35 m	20.6 m	1,600	420	18	
Moby Tommy	(Italy)	2002	2007	28,915 GT	212 m	25 m	2,200	580	30	
Vincenzo Florio	(Italy)	1999	2024	31,041 GT	180.3 m	26.8 m	1.471	630	23	
Raffaele Rubattino	(Italy)	2000	2024	31,041 GT	180.3 m	26.8 m	1.471	630	23	
Moby Wonder	(Italy)	2001	2001	36,093 GT	175 m	27 m	2,200	750	29	
Moby Aki	(Italy)	2005	2005	36,284 GT	175 m	27 m	2,200	750	29	
Moby Orli	(Italy)	1986	2017	37,583 GT	176.8 m	32.9 m	2,500	580	22	
Moby Fantasy	(Italy)	2021	2023	69,500 GT	237 m	32 m	3,000	1,300	23.5	
Moby Legacy	(Italy)	2023	2024	69,500 GT	237 m	32 m	3,000	1,300	23.5	

=== Former fleet ===
- Maria Maddalena (1959-1978) as Maria Maddalena for SNAP since 2005
- Elba Prima (1967-2007) scrapped as Prima in Aliağa, Turkey in 2008
- Portoferraio (1974-2001) as Bomaris Legend for Bomaris Shipping since 2016.
- Citta di Piombino (1978-2002) as Don Peppino for GesTour since 2010.
- Moby Blu (1982-2003) scrapped as Moby B in Alang, India in 2003.
- Moby Prince (1985-1991) in 11th April 1991 the ship departured from Livorno and collided with the tanker Agip Abruzzo; the ship caught fire and 141 passengers died onboard. In 1998 the ship partially sank in the port of Livorno and then the ship sold for scrap in Aliağa, Turkey in 1998.
- Moby Dream (1986-1994) scrapped as Sardegna Bella in Aliağa, Turkey in 2001.
- Moby Quest (1975-2009) scrapped as Fantasy Emerald in Chittagong Bangladesh in 2009
- Moby Love (1986-1993) scrapped in Aliağa, Turkey in 2011.
- Moby Will (1988-1993) scrapped as Aljubi in Alang, India in 2007.
- Moby King (1989-2002) scrapped in Alang, India in 2002.
- Moby Baby (1990-2017) scrapped as Anemos in Aliağa, Turkey in 2018.
- Moby Vincent (1990-2024) scrapped in Aliağa, Turkey in 2024.
- Moby Fantasy (1992-2013) Laid Up in Valletta Malta Since in 2013.
- Moby Magic (1997-2005) scrapped in Aliağa, Turkey in 2005.
- Moby Love (1998-2017) as Sporades Star for Seajets since 2021.
- Moby Gum (1998-2003) scrapped as Moby G in Bombay, India in 2004.
- Moby Rider (1998-2007) scrapped as M. River in Alang, India in 2007.
- Moby Freedom (2001-2012) as Finlandia for Eckerö Line since 2019.
- Luigi Pa (1987-2017) former Isola delle Stelle for Lloyd Sardegna, as Cenk M since 2019.
- Giuseppe Sa (2006-2022) former Isola delle Perle for Lloys Sardegna, sold to an Arabic company in 2022.
- Eliana M (2006-2007) former Golfo del Sole for Lloyd Sardegna, scrapped in Aliağa, Turkey in 2012.
- Maria Grazia On. (2006-2007) former Golfo degli Angeli for Lloyd Sardegna, as Venezia for Grimaldi Lines since 2019.
- Golfo Aranci (2006-2007) as Florencia for Grimaldi Lines since 2007.
- Massimo M. (2010-2013) Scrapped in 2013.
- Moby Vinci (2023-2024) Sold to Grandi Navi Veloci in 2024.
- Pietro Manunta (2016-2024) Sold to SALEM AL MAKRANI CARGO CO in 2024.
- Moby Corse (2009-2024) Sold to Ferry Med in 2024.
- Bastia (1974-2024) Sold to Alilauro Gru.So.N. in 2024.
- Moby Ale (1997-2024) Scrapped in Aliağa, Turkey in 2024.
- Moby Baby Two (2000-2024) Scrapped in Aliağa, Turkey in 2024.
- Moby Dada (2016-2025) Sold for scrap in Aliağa, Turkey in 2025.
- Moby Zazà (2015-2025) Sold to Atlantis Maritime S.A. in 2025.
- Moby Drea (2003-2025) Sold for scrap in 2025.
- Moby Otta (2006-2025) Sold to Hoiyu International Group in 2025.
- Moby Ale Due (2024-2025) Sold to Grandi Navi Veloci in 2025.

== Routes ==
- Livorno ↔ Olbia: Moby Fantasy / Moby Legacy
- Livorno ↔ Bastia: Moby Kiss
- Civitavecchia ↔ Olbia Moby Tommy / Vincenzo Florio
- Genoa ↔ Olbia: Moby Aki / Moby Orli
- Genoa ↔ Porto Torres: Moby Wonder / Raffaele Rubattino
- Piombino ↔ Portoferraio: Moby Niki / Giraglia
- Santa Teresa Gallura ↔ Bonifacio: Bunifazziu
