= Kydon Palace =

High-speed cruise ferry

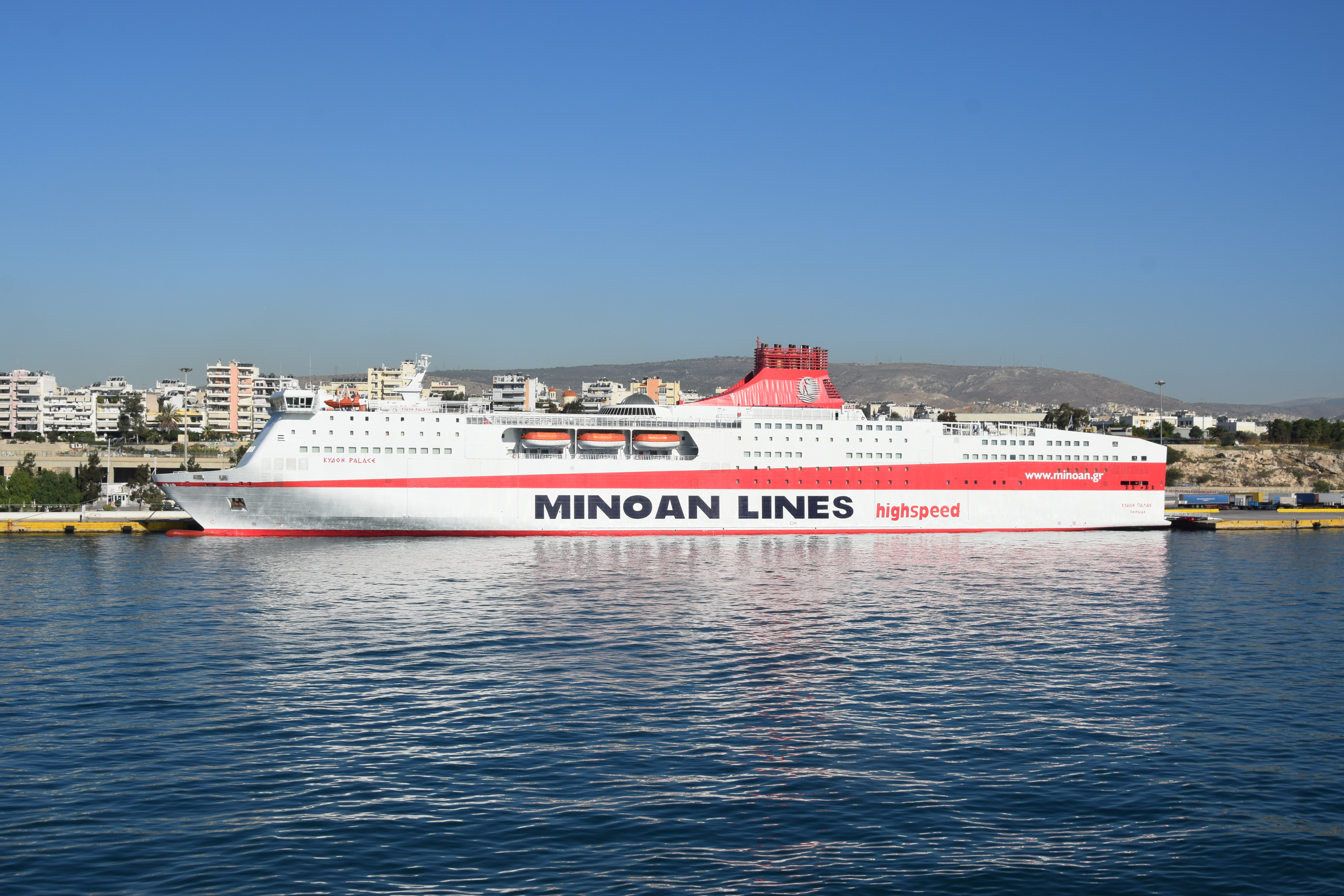
- Kydon Palace

History
- Name: Festos Palace (2000–2020); Kydon Palace (2020–present)
- Namesake: Phaistos; Kydon of Crete
- Owner: Minoan Lines
- Port of registry: Piraeus, Greece
- Route: Piraeus–Chania
- Builder: Sestri Ponente shipyards
- Yard number: 6060
- Launched: 16 November 2000
- Completed: 19 April 2001
- Identification: IMO number: 9204568; MMSI number: 237611000
- Status: In service

General characteristics
- Type: Ro-pax ferry
- Tonnage: 37,550 GT
- Length: 214 m (702 ft 1 in)
- Beam: 26.4 m (86 ft 7 in)
- Draft: 7.3 m (23 ft 11 in)
- Depth: 15.7 m (51 ft 6 in)
- Ramps: 2 aft
- Installed power: 4 × Wärtsilä diesel engines, 67,200 kW (90,100 hp) total
- Propulsion: 2 screw propellers
- Speed: 29.5 knots (54.6 km/h; 33.9 mph)
- Capacity: 2,500 passengers (later reduced to 1,718 passengers); 665 cars

Kydon Palace is a Greek Ro-Pax high speed ferry, built in 2001 at the Sestri Ponente shipyards by Fincantieri as Festos Palace for Minoan Lines' overnight services between Piraeus and Crete. Initially she ran to Heraklion. In 2020 she was transferred to the Piraeus–Chania route and renamed Kydon Palace She is a sister ship of Cruise Bonaria. She can reach speeds up to 30 knots (56 km/h; 35 mph). The ship's facilities include restaurants, bars and cabins.

== Design and construction ==
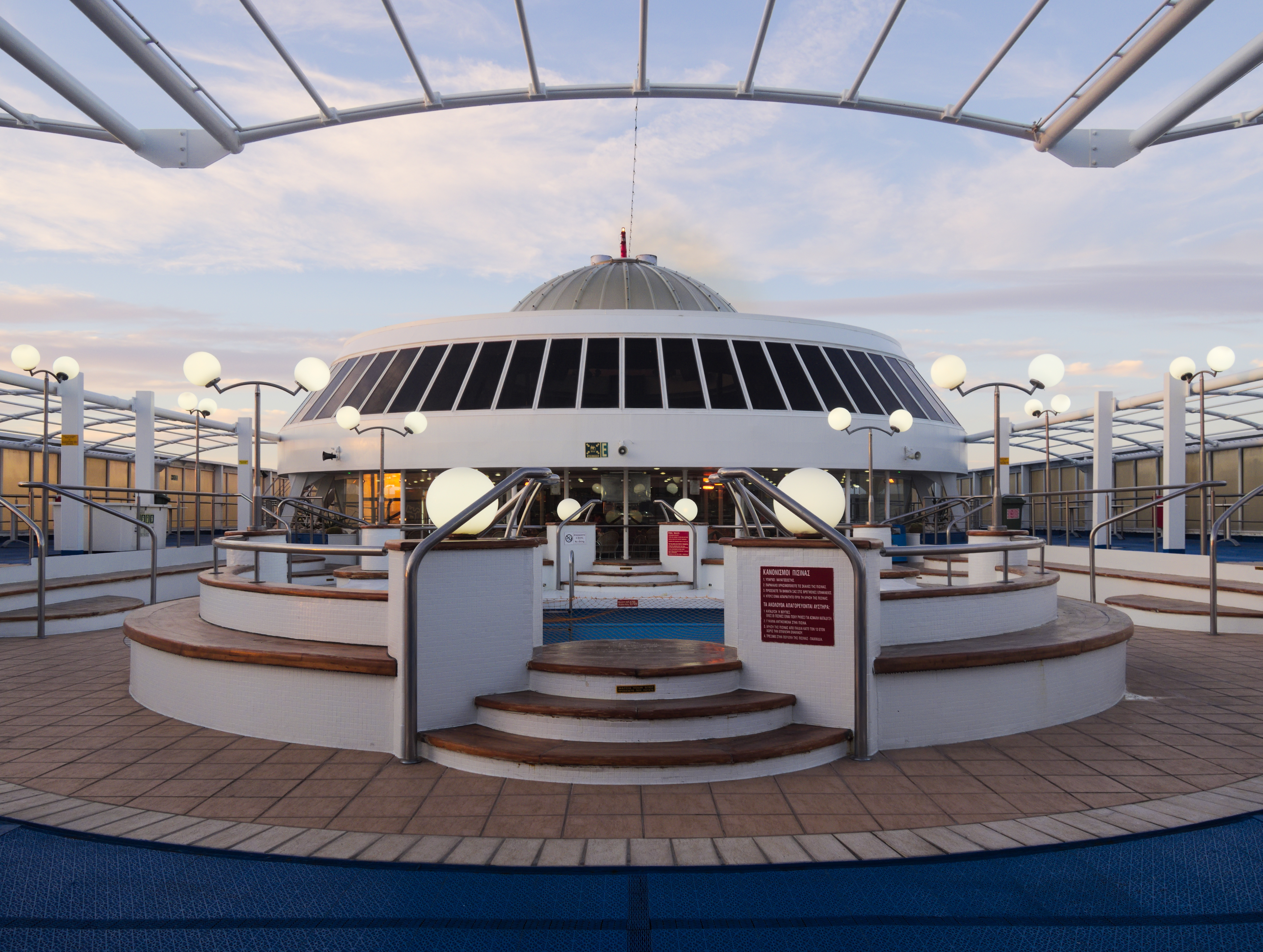
Swimming pool

Festos Palace was designed as a Ro-pax night ferry for service between Piraeus and Heraklion, Crete, though also used for daytime voyages. Together with her sister ship Knossos Palace, she is very similar to the Janas class, built by Fincantieri for Tirrenia at the same time.

As built, the ferry measured 37,482 gross tonnage (GT). Her original dimensions were 214.00 m (702 ft 1 in) long overall and 191.22 m (627 ft 4 in) between perpendiculars, with a 26.40 m (86 ft 7 in) beam, a 15.67 m (51 ft 5 in) depth, and a draught of 7.30 m (23 ft 11 in). The vessel had an original capacity for 1,000 cars, with a usable lane length of 1,850 m (6,070 ft) and could carry 760 berthed and 1,240 deck passengers. She is powered by four Wärtsilä 16V46C diesel engines, together rated at 67,200 kW (90,100 hp), giving the ship a service speed of 29.5 knots (54.6 km/h; 33.9 mph).

In total, the ship has eight decks. The Deck 5 is called "Androgeo" and features the reception. The Deck 6 is called "Atlantis", where it has an à la carte restaurant called "Yakinthos", with a capacity of 241 people, as well as a self-service restaurant called "Dionysos", with a capacity of 300 people. The difference between the two restaurants is that in one the passengers serve themselves, while in the other they order their meal. On the same deck there is a lounge called "Niovi", an Internet café, outdoor decks and a shop called "Erofili". In the bow there is a large lounge, the "King Radamanthys". There is also the VIP Lounge - Lux Cabins, with a capacity of 98 people. The Deck 7 is called "Zakros" and has cabins as well as airline-type seats. The Deck 8 is called "Zephyros" and has VIP airline-type seats, swimming pools, a sun deck and a pool bar, which are open during the summer months. There is also the round deck "Asterion" and the disco "Selini"; the ship's bridge is on the same deck.

== In service ==
In 2020, she was transferred from the Piraeus-Heraklion line to Piraeus-Chania and renamed Kydon Palace after Kydon of Crete, the mythical founder of Kydonia, an ancient city of Crete in present-day Chania. She was inaugurated on 22 February 2020, by the Deputy Regional Governor of Chania, N. Kalogeris. A second inauguration ceremony took place on July 25 of the same year, in the presence of the Greek Minister of Shipping and Island Policy, Giannis Plakiotakis and the president of the Grimaldi Group, Emanuel Grimaldi.
