= MS Jean Nicoli (1997) =

French ferry

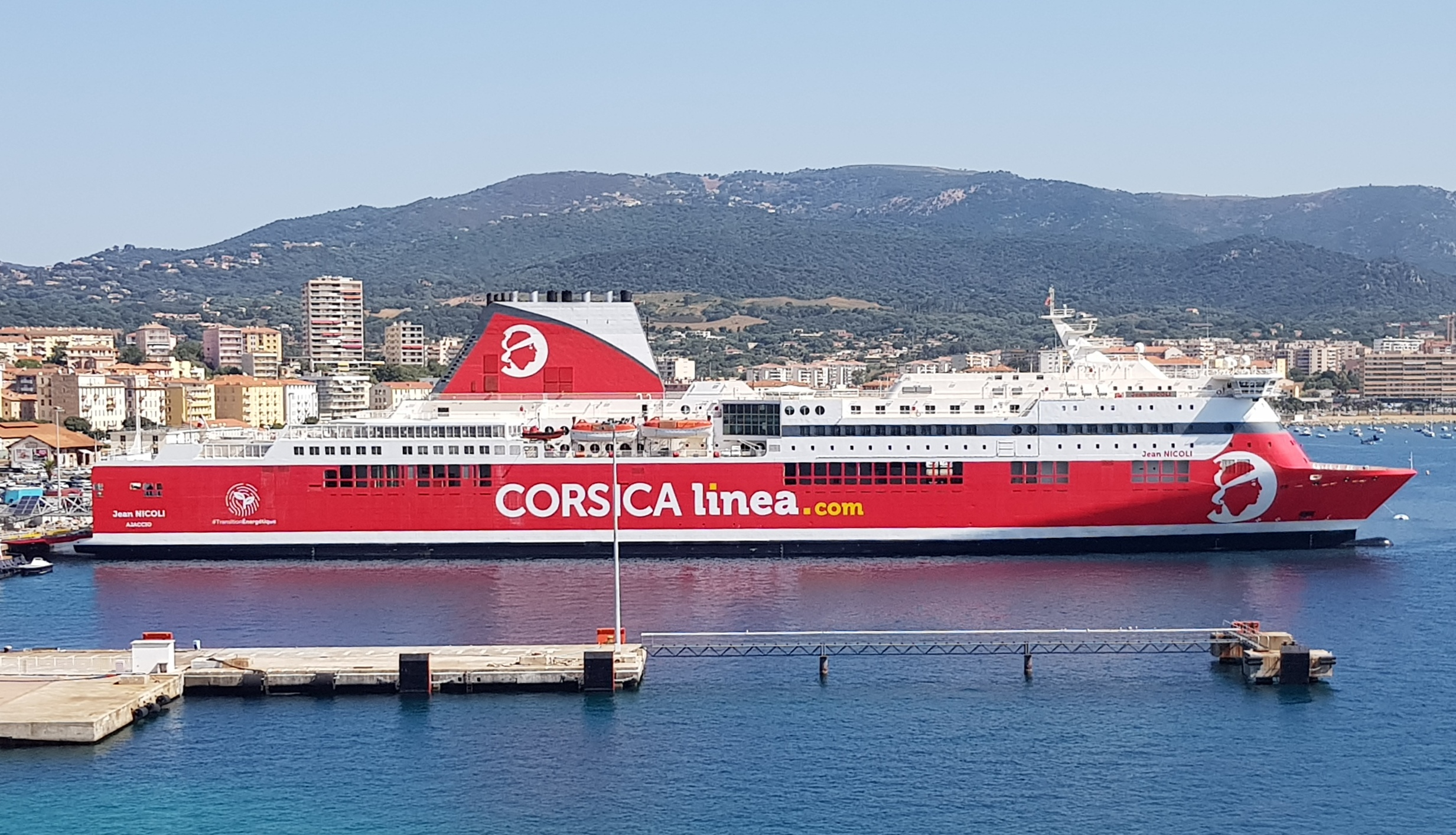
- Jean Nicoli in Ajaccio

History
- Name: (1998–2002): Pasiphae; (2002–2009): Pasiphae Palace; (2009–present): Jean Nicoli
- Owner: (1998–2009): Minoan Lines; (2009–2016): SNCM; (2016–present): Corsica Linea
- Operator: (1998–2009): Minoan Lines; (2009–2016): SNCM; (2016–present): Corsica Linea
- Port of registry: (1998–2009): Heraklion, Greece; (2009–present): Ajaccio, France
- Route: Marseille – Ajaccio / Porto-Vecchio / Porto Torres; Former: Patras – Igoumenitsa – Corfu – Venice / Ancona
- Ordered: 30 November 1996
- Builder: Fosen Mekaniske Verksteder (Rissa, Norway); Bruce Shipyard (Landskrona, Sweden; hull)
- Yard number: 67 / 363
- Laid down: 2 June 1997
- Launched: 20 December 1997
- Completed: 13 June 1998
- Acquired: 13 June 1998 (by Minoan Lines) 19 January 2009 (by SNCM) 2016 (by Corsica Linea)
- Maiden voyage: 4 July 1998
- In service: 1998
- Identification: IMO number: 9161948; Call sign: FNPV; MMSI number: 226280000
- Status: In service

General characteristics
- Class & type: Fosen Fast Cruise Ferry (Ikarus Class)
- Tonnage: 30,010 GT; 5,210 DWT
- Length: 200.65 m (658 ft 4 in)
- Beam: 25.80 m (84 ft 8 in)
- Draught: 6.60 m (21 ft 8 in)
- Decks: 10
- Ramps: Bow and stern vehicle loading ramps
- Installed power: 4 × Wärtsilä-SACM 16V46B diesel engines (total 44,480 kW / 59,650 hp)
- Propulsion: 2 × controllable pitch propellers
- Speed: 27.0 knots (50.0 km/h; 31.1 mph) (service)
- Capacity: 1,500 passengers (1,059 beds in 282 cabins); 600 cars / 2,200 lane metres for freight
- Crew: 80

MS Jean Nicoli is a French RO/PAX ferry, now owned and operated by Corsica Linea. The ship built in 1998 at Fosen Mek Verksteder A/S, Norway for Minoan Lines. Her first name was Pasiphae and then renamed Pasiphae Palace. She has a sister ship AF Mia, previously named Ikarus Palace.

== Minoan Lines ==
The ship departed from Rissa, Norway on 13 June 1998 and arrived in Piraeus, Greece on 15 June 1998. The first christening became in Piraeus, Greece and after she departed from Piraeus and arrived in Heraklion, Crete which became the second christening. Her maiden voyage did it on 4 July 1998 on Patras-Igoumenitsa-Corfu-Venice route. During her maiden voyage, Pasiphae grounded on rocks near Corfu. The ship after the grounding went in Elefsina Shipyards for constructions. The ship entered in service again on 30 July. In 2001 renamed Pasiphae Palace and did the Patras-Igoumenitsa-Corfu-Venice route with her sister ship Ikarus Palace. The ship also did sometimes the Piraeus-Heraklion route.

== SNCM and Corsica Linea ==
Pasiphae Palace was sold to Société nationale maritime Corse-Méditerranée (SNCM) on 19 January 2009 and her name changed to Jean Nicoli. She was delivered at the Elefsis shipyards, Greece in March 2009, sailing from Greece for Marseille on 24 April. For SNCM the ship sailed on the Ajaccio-Porto Torres route.

Jean Nicoli was sold in 2017 to Corsica Linea following SNCM's closure and although repainted, she remained Jean Nicoli. In March 2020 Corsica Linea installed a scrubber system in Jean Nicoli at Palumbo Shipyards, Malta.

== Accidents ==
- On 5 July 1998 during her maiden voyage Pasiphae grounded on the rocks a few nautical miles away from Corfu
- On 6 February 2008 Pasiphae Palace hit at the port of Heraklion, Crete
- On 11 December 2008 Pasiphae Palace hit at the port of Patras, Greece
- On 8 March 2017 Jean Nicoli hit by 15m wave at the Cape Leone with big damages at the bridge and windows of the ship. Nobody from the passengers was injured.

== Route ==
Jean Nicoli is doing every day the Ajaccio-Marseille route.
