= Cruise Bonaria =

Ferry built by Fincantieri

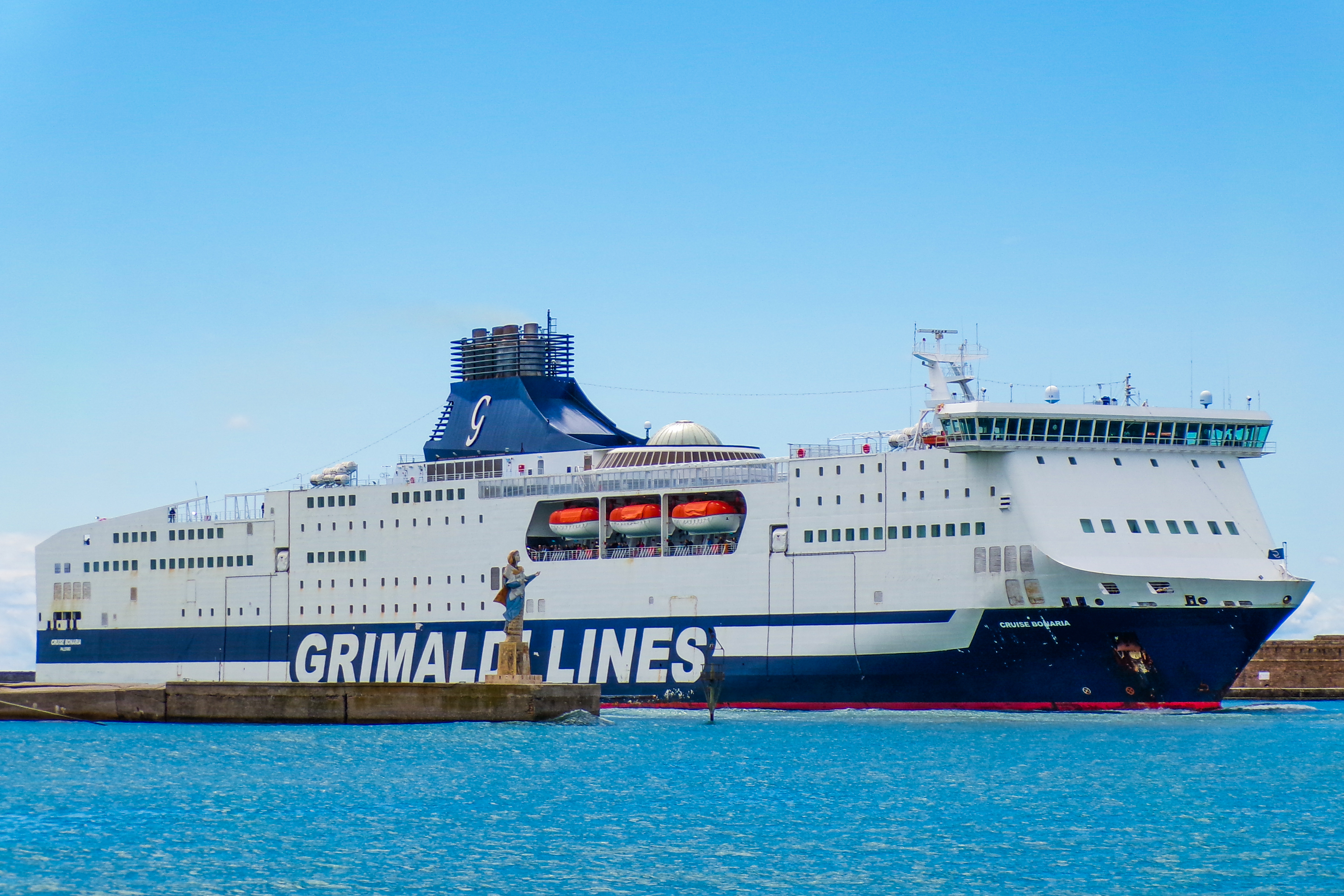
- Cruise Bonaria in 2024

History

Italy
- Name: Knossos Palace (2000–2020); Cruise Bonaria (2020–present)
- Owner: Minoan Lines (2000–2020); Grimaldi Lines (2020–present)
- Port of registry: Heraklion, Greece (2000–2020) Palermo, Italy (2020–present)
- Route: Patras-Igoumenitsa-Brindisi
- Builder: Sestri Ponente shipyards
- Yard number: 6059
- Launched: 28 June 2000
- Completed: 2000
- Identification: IMO number: 9204063; Call sign: SYQO; MMSI number: 237641000
- Status: In service

General characteristics
- Type: Ro-pax ferry
- Tonnage: 37,551 GT; 5,493 DWT
- Length: 214 m (702 ft 1 in)
- Beam: 26.4 m (86 ft 7 in)
- Height: 7.10 m (23 ft 4 in)
- Ramps: Two
- Installed power: Four diesel engines, 67,517 kW (combined)
- Speed: 31.6 knots (58.5 km/h; 36.4 mph)
- Capacity: 2,500 passengers; 700 cars

Cruise Bonaria is a roll-on/roll-off high speed ferry, built in 2000 at the Sestri Ponente shipyards by Fincantieri and owned by Grimaldi Lines previously owned by Minoan Lines as Knossos Palace. It can accommodate up to 2,500 passengers and 700 cars, and has 758 beds plus 742 airseats for passengers. The vessel is powered by four Wärtsilä 16V46C diesel engines with a combined power of 67,517 kW (90,542 hp), which give her a top speed of 31.6 knots (58.5 km/h; 36.4 mph). In November 2020 Minoan Lines announced that Knossos Palace exchanged with her former ship Cruise Bonaria previously named Olympia Palace. The first sold to Grimaldi Lines and renamed it Cruise Bonaria and the other one renamed Knossos Palace. The former Knossos Palace was under the Minoan Lines 20 years. For 20 years did the Piraeus-Heraklion route. The ship left Greece on 24 November and arrived at Naples, Italy after two days.

== Route ==
Knossos Palace served the overnight route Piraeus–Heraklion and Heraklion–Piraeus, except for some rare occasions in which it replaces other ships of Minoan Lines in their routes. During the holiday season, it occasionally operated during daytime, completing her voyage in eight hours.

== Incidents ==
On November 19, 2003 Knossos Palace was sailing 40 nmi (74 km; 46 mi) northwest of Heraklion en route from Piraeus when a fire broke out on board. The fire was caused by a truck in the vessel's garage that was carrying chemicals. The crew swiftly dealt with the emergency and the fire was put out using the sprinkler system before causing major damage. However, the fire damaged the cables powering the passenger drawbridge, which became inoperable. As a result, an airport staircase had to be brought to the port in order to allow safe disembarkation.
