= List of largest ferries of Europe =

In terms of gross tonnage, the largest ferry in the world is the 75,156-ton Color Magic, built by Aker Finnyards of Finland, and operated by Color Line on the route between Oslo in Norway and Kiel in Germany. Its sister ship Color Fantasy comes a close second in tonnage. As a measure of the total internal volume of a ship, gross tonnage is most commonly used to compare the size of civilian ships. However, single dimensions are also often compared. For example, Cruise Roma became the longest ferry in the world after being lengthened in 2019. The cruiseferry Silja Europa with a gross tonnage of around 60,000 tonnes can carry up to 3,750 passengers, more than any other ferry in Europe.

The largest ferries of Europe
Ship	Length	GT	Passengers	Speed	Built	Builder	Company	Registry	Normal route(s)	Notes
Color Magic	223.70 m (733.9 ft)	75,156	2,812	22 kn (41 km/h; 25 mph)	2007	Aker Finnyards Turku Shipyard / Rauma shipyard, Finland	Color Line	Norway	Oslo - Kiel	Largest ferry in the world in terms of gross tonnage.
Color Fantasy	223.70 m (733.9 ft)	74,027	2,605	22 kn (41 km/h; 25 mph)	2004	Aker Finnyards Turku Shipyard, Finland	Color Line	Norway	Oslo - Kiel	
Moby Legacy	237 m (778 ft)	69,500	2,500	23.5 kn (43.5 km/h; 27.0 mph)	2021	Guangzhou Shipyard International Company Limited	Moby Lines	Italy	Livorno - Olbia	
it:Moby Fantasy	237 m (778 ft)	69,500	2,500	23.5 kn (43.5 km/h; 27.0 mph)	2023	Guangzhou Shipyard International Company Limited	Moby Lines	Italy	Livorno - Olbia (late 2023)	
Viking Glory	222.50 m (730.0 ft)	65,211	2,800	22 kn (41 km/h; 25 mph)	2021	Xiamen Shipbuilding Industry Company China	Viking Line	Finland	Turku - Mariehamn - Stockholm	Fuel: Liquefied natural gas (LNG). Largest LNG powered ferry in the world.
Finnsirius	235 m (771 ft)	65,692	1,100	21 kn (39 km/h; 24 mph)	2023	China Merchants Jinling Shipyard(Weihai) Co., Ltd	Finnlines	Finland	Naantali - Långnäs - Kapellskär	Fuel: diesel-battery hybrid.
Finncanopus	235 m (771 ft)	65,692	1,100	21 kn (39 km/h; 24 mph)	2023	China Merchants Jinling Shipyard(Weihai) Co., Ltd	Finnlines	Finland	Naantali - Långnäs - Kapellskär	Fuel: diesel-battery hybrid.
Stena Britannica	240 m (790 ft)	64,039	1,200	22 kn (41 km/h; 25 mph)	2010	Wadan Yards, Wismar	Stena Line	United Kingdom	Harwich - Hoek van Holland	
Stena Hollandica	240 m (790 ft)	64,039	1,200	22 kn (41 km/h; 25 mph)	2010	Wadan Yards, Wismar	Stena Line	Netherlands	Harwich - Hoek van Holland	
Cruise Barcelona	254 m (833 ft)	63,742	3,500	28 kn (52 km/h; 32 mph)	2008	Fincantieri, Castellammare di Stabia, Italy	Grimaldi Lines	Italy	Rome (Civitavecchia) - Porto Torres - Barcelona	Originally 225 m., lengthened in 2019.
Cruise Roma	254 m (833 ft)	63,742	3,500	28 kn (52 km/h; 32 mph)	2007	Fincantieri, Castellammare di Stabia, Italy	Grimaldi Lines	Italy	Rome (Civitavecchia) - Porto Torres - Barcelona	Originally 225 m., lengthened in 2019.
Pride of Rotterdam	215.44 m (706.8 ft)	59,925	1,360	22 kn (41 km/h; 25 mph)	2001	Fincantieri, Venice, Italy	P&O Ferries	Netherlands	Hull - Rotterdam (Europoort)	
Pride of Hull	215.44 m (706.8 ft)	59,925	1,360	22 kn (41 km/h; 25 mph)	2001	Fincantieri, Venice, Italy	P&O Ferries	Bahamas	Hull - Rotterdam (Europoort)	
Silja Europa	203.03 m (666.1 ft)	59,914	3,750	22 kn (41 km/h; 25 mph)	1993	Meyer Werft, Papenburg, Germany	Tallink	Estonia	Accommodation in the Netherlands	Ordered by Rederi AB Slite for Viking Line traffic. In Silja Line traffic between 1993 and 2013. The largest cruiseferry in the world between 1992 and 2002. Largest ferry in the world in terms of number of beds and passenger capacity
Silja Symphony	203 m (666 ft)	58,377	2,850	22 kn (41 km/h; 25 mph)	1991	Masa-Yards Turku New Shipyard, Finland	Silja Line	Sweden	Stockholm - Mariehamn - Helsinki	
Silja Serenade	203 m (666 ft)	58,376	2,841	22 kn (41 km/h; 25 mph)	1990	Masa-Yards Turku New Shipyard, Finland	Silja Line	Finland	Stockholm - Mariehamn - Helsinki	
Stena Scandinavica	240.00 m (787.40 ft)	57,639	1,300	23 kn (43 km/h; 26 mph)	2003	Hyundai Heavy Industries, South Korea	Stena Line	Sweden	Gothenburg - Kiel	Originally 210.8 metres (692 ft), lengthened 2007.
Viking Grace	213.00 m (698.82 ft)	57,565	2,800	22 kn (41 km/h; 25 mph)	2013	STX Finland Turku Shipyard, Finland	Viking Line	Finland	Stockholm - Mariehamn - Turku	Fuel: Liquefied natural gas (LNG)
Nils Holgersson	229.40 m (752.6 ft)	56,138	800	22 kn (41 km/h; 25 mph)	2022	Nanjing Jingling Shipyard, Yizheng China	TT Line	Germany	Travemünde - Trelleborg	Fuel: Liquefied natural gas (LNG)
Peter Pan	229.40 m (752.6 ft)	56,138	800	22 kn (41 km/h; 25 mph)	2022	Nanjing Jingling Shipyard, Yizheng China	TT Line	Cyprus	Travemünde - Trelleborg	Fuel: Liquefied natural gas (LNG)
Aura Seaways	230.00 m (754.59 ft)	56,043	600	23 kn (43 km/h; 26 mph)	2021	Guangzhou Shipyard, China	DFDS Seaways	Denmark	Klaipeda - Karlshamn	
Luna Seaways	230.00 m (754.59 ft)	56,043	600	23 kn (43 km/h; 26 mph)	2022	Guangzhou Shipyard, China	DFDS Seaways	Denmark	Klaipeda - Karlshamn	
Cruise Europa	225 m (738 ft)	54,310	3,000	28 kn (52 km/h; 32 mph)	2009	Fincantieri, Castellammare di Stabia, Italy	Grimaldi Lines	Italy	Livorno - Olbia	
Cruise Sardegna	225 m (738 ft)	54,310	3,000	28 kn (52 km/h; 32 mph)	2009	Fincantieri, Castellammare di Stabia, Italy	Grimaldi Lines	Italy	Livorno - Olbia	Ex. Cruise Olympia
Tanit	212 m (696 ft)	52 645	3,200	27.5 kn (50.9 km/h; 31.6 mph)	2012	DMSE, South Korea	CTN	Tunisia	La Goulette - Marseille; La Goulette - Genoa	
Stena Germanica	240 m (790 ft)	51,837	1,300	22 kn (41 km/h; 25 mph)	2001	Astilleros Españoles, Puerto Real, Spain	Stena Line	Sweden	Gothenburg - Kiel	Originally 188.30 metres (617.8 ft), lengthened 2007, renamed from Stena Hollandica, renamed from Stena Germanica III
W.B. Yeats	195 m (640 ft)	51,388	1,885	25 kn (46 km/h)	2018	Flensburger Schiffbau-Gesellschaft, Flensburg, Germany	Irish Ferries	Cyprus	Dublin - Cherbourg (summer); Dublin - Holyhead (winter)	
Ulysses	209.02 m (685.8 ft)	50,940	2,166	22 kn (41 km/h; 25 mph)	2001	Aker Finnyards Rauma shipyard, Finland	Irish Ferries	Cyprus	Dublin - Holyhead	
MyStar	212.10 m (696 ft)	50,629	2,800	27 kn (50 km/h; 31 mph)	2022	Rauma Marine Constructions, Rauma, Finland	Tallink	Estonia	Tallinn - Helsinki	Fuel: Liquefied natural gas (LNG)
Badji Mokhtar III	199.9 m (655.8 ft)	49,785	1,800	24 kn (44 km/h; 28 mph)	2021	Guangzhou Shipyard International, China	Algérie Ferries	Algeria	Algiers - Marseille	
La Suprema	211 m (692 ft)	49,270	3,000	29 kn (54 km/h; 33 mph)	2003	Nuovi Cantieri Apuania, Marina di Carrara, Italy	Grandi Navi Veloci	Italy	Genoa - Palermo; Genoa - Tunis	
La Superba	211 m (692 ft)	49,270	3,000	29 kn (54 km/h; 33 mph)	2002	Nuovi Cantieri Apuania, Marina di Carrara, Italy	Grandi Navi Veloci	Italy	Genoa - Palermo; Genoa - Tunis	
Megastar	212.10 m (696 ft)	49,134	2,800	27 kn (50 km/h; 31 mph)	2017	Meyer Turku, Turku, Finland	Tallink	Estonia	Tallinn - Helsinki	Fuel: Liquefied natural gas (LNG)
Baltic Queen	212.10 m (695.9 ft)	48,915	2,800	24.5 kn (45.4 km/h; 28.2 mph)	2009	STX Europe Rauma shipyard, Finland	Tallink	Estonia	Tallinn - Mariehamn - Stockholm	
Baltic Princess	212.10 m (695.9 ft)	48,915	2,800	24.5 kn (45.4 km/h; 28.2 mph)	2008	Aker Finnyards Helsinki Shipyard, Finland	Silja Line	Finland	Stockholm - Mariehamn - Turku	
Galaxy	212.10 m (695.9 ft)	48,915	2,700	22 kn (41 km/h; 25 mph)	2006	Aker Finnyards Rauma shipyard, Finland	Tallink	Latvia	Accommodation in the Netherlands	
Bursztyn Unity	195.6 m (641.7 ft)	48,627	400	19 kn (35 km/h; 21 mph)	2026	Gdańsk Remontowa shipyard, Poland	POLSCA (Unity Line)	Poland	Świnoujście - Ystad	Fuel: Liquefied natural gas (LNG)
Jantar Unity	195.6 m (641.7 ft)	48,627	400	19 kn (35 km/h; 21 mph)	2025	Gdańsk Remontowa shipyard, Poland	POLSCA (Unity Line)	Cyprus	Świnoujście - Trelleborg	Fuel: Liquefied natural gas (LNG)
Oscar Wilde	213.00 m (698.82 ft)	47,600	2,000	22 kn (41 km/h; 25 mph)	2010	STX Europe Rauma shipyard, Finland	Irish Ferries	Cyprus	Dover - Calais	
Spirit of France	213.50 m (700.5 ft)	47,600	2,000	22 kn (41 km/h; 25 mph)	2011	STX Europe Rauma shipyard, Finland	P&O Ferries	Cyprus	Dover - Calais	In service September 2011.
P&O Pioneer	230.5 m (756 ft)	47,394	1,500	20.8 kn (38.5 km/h; 23.9 mph)	2022	Guangzhou Shipyard International Company	P&O Ferries	Cyprus	Dover - Calais	Fuel: diesel-electric hybrid. In service April 2023. Largest double ended ferry in the world.
P&O Liberté	230.5 m (756 ft)	47,394	1,500	20.8 kn (38.5 km/h; 23.9 mph)	2023	Guangzhou Shipyard International Company Limited	P&O Ferries	Cyprus	Dover - Calais	Fuel: diesel-electric hybrid. In service late 2023.
Viking Cinderella	191 m (627 ft)	46,398	2,700	22 kn (41 km/h; 25 mph)	1989	Wärtsilä Marine Perno Shipyard, Finland	Viking Line	Finland	Helsinki - Mariehamn - Stockholm	
Stena Estelle	239.7 m (786.41 ft)	45,000	1,200	22 knots (41 km/h; 25 mph)	2022	China Merchants Jinling Shipyard(Weihai) Co., Ltd	Stena Line	Denmark	Karlskrona - Gdynia	
Stena Ebba	239.7 m (786.41 ft)	45,000	1,200	22 knots (41 km/h; 25 mph)	2022	China Merchants Jinling Shipyard(Weihai) Co., Ltd	Stena Line	Denmark	Karlskrona - Gdynia	
Rhapsody	172 m (564 ft)	44,307	2,450	24 kn (44 km/h; 28 mph)	1996	Chantiers de l'Atlantique, Saint Nazaire, France	Grandi Navi Veloci	Italy	Olbia - Genova	
Tinker Bell	220m	44,245	744	22 kn (41 km/h; 25 mph)	2001	Schichau Seebeckwerft GmbH, Bremerhaven, Germany	TT-Line	Sweden	Travemunde - Trelleborg - Rostock	Originally 191m and 36,468GT. Lengthened 2018. Renamed from Peter Pan was renamed Tinker Bell to release the name for a new build sister to Nils Holgersson
Stena Adventurer	211.56 m (694.1 ft)	43,532	1,500	23 kn (43 km/h; 26 mph)	2003	Hyundai Heavy Industries, Ulsan, South Korea	Stena Line	United Kingdom	Holyhead - Dublin	
Finnstar	218.8 m (718 ft)	42,923	500	25 kn (46 km/h; 29 mph)	2006	Finncantieri, Ancona, Italy	Finnlines	Finland	Helsinki - Travemunde	
Finnmaid	218.8 m (718 ft)	42,923	500	25 kn (46 km/h; 29 mph)	2006	Finncantieri, Ancona, Italy	Finnlines	Finland	Helsinki - Travemunde	
Finnlady	218.8 m (718 ft)	42,923	500	25 kn (46 km/h; 29 mph)	2007	Finncantieri, Ancona, Italy	Finnlines	Finland	Helsinki - Travemunde	Ordered as Europalink. Renamed prior entering service.
Europalink	218.8 m (718 ft)	42,923	500	25 kn (46 km/h; 29 mph)	2007	Finncantieri, Ancona, Italy	Grimaldi Lines	Sweden	Ancona-Igoumenitsa-Patras	Ordered as Finnlady. Renamed prior entering service.
Finnswan	218.8 m (718 ft)	42,923	500	25 kn (46 km/h; 29 mph)	2007	Finncantieri, Ancona, Italy	Finnlines	Finland	Malmö-Travemünde	Formerly Nordlink.
Skåne	199 m (653 ft)	42,705	600	21 kn (39 km/h; 24 mph)	1998	Astilleros Españoles, Puerto Real, Spain	Stena Line	Sweden	Trelleborg - Rostock	Biggest train ferry in the world
Rusadir	187.4 m (615 ft)	42,400	1,680	22 kn (41 km/h; 25 mph)	2022	Flensburger Schiffbau-Gesellschaft	Baleària	Cyprus	Malaga - Melilla	Ordered for Brittany Ferries, cancelled order before completion. Currently available for sale or charter. Fuel: Liquified natural gas (LNG)
Piana	180 m (590.6 ft)	42,180	750	24 kn (44 km/h; 28 mph)	2011	Brodosplit, Split, Croatia	La Méridionale	France	Marseille - Bastia; Marseille - Ajaccio	
Varsovia	216,2 m (709,3 ft)	41,878	976	24 kn (44 km/h; 28 mph)	2024	Cantiere Navale Visentini, Donada, Italy	POLSCA (Polferries)	Cyprus	Świnoujście-Ystad	The bareboat charter contract has been extended and announced in summer 2022. The Polish shipowner will rent the ship for a period of 10 years, with priority purchase after 6 years of use. Fuel: Liquified natural gas (LNG)
Santoña	214.5 m (703.7 ft)	41,863	1,015	22 knots (41 km/h; 25 mph)	2022	China Merchants Jinling Shipyard(Weihai) Co., Ltd	Brittany Ferries	France	Portsmouth - Santander; Portsmouth - Cherbourg	Fuel: Liquefied natural gas (LNG). Entry into service March 2023.
Salamanca	214.5 m (703.7 ft)	41,863	1,015	22 knots (41 km/h; 25 mph)	2021	China Merchants Jinling Shipyard(Weihai) Co., Ltd	Brittany Ferries	France	Portsmouth - Bilbao; Portsmouth - Cherbourg	Fuel: Liquefied natural gas (LNG)
Galicia	214.5 m (703.7 ft)	41,863	1,015	22 knots (41 km/h; 25 mph)	2020	China Merchants Jinling Shipyard(Weihai) Co., Ltd	Brittany Ferries	France	Rosslare - Bilbao; Rosslare - Cherbourg	Currently serving Portsmouth - Santander and Cherbourg, transferring to Ireland-based routes once replaced by Santoña.
Pont-Aven	184.6 m (606 ft)	41,758	2,400	27 kn (50 km/h; 31 mph)	2004	Meyer Werft, Papenburg, Germany	Brittany Ferries	France	Santander - Plymouth - Roscoff - Cork; Portsmouth - St. Malo (winter only)	
Stena Estrid	214.5 m (703.7 ft)	41,671	1,000	22 knots (41 km/h; 25 mph)	2019	China Merchants Jinling Shipyard(Weihai) Co., Ltd	Stena Line	Cyprus	Holyhead - Dublin	
Stena Edda	214.5 m (703.7 ft)	41,671	1,000	22 knots (41 km/h; 25 mph)	2020	China Merchants Jinling Shipyard(Weihai) Co., Ltd	Stena Line	Cyprus	Liverpool (Birkenhead) - Belfast	
Stena Embla	214.5 m (703.7 ft)	41,671	1,000	22 knots (41 km/h; 25 mph)	2020	China Merchants Jinling Shipyard(Weihai) Co., Ltd	Stena Line	Cyprus	Liverpool (Birkenhead) - Belfast	
Danielle Casanova	175 m (574 ft)	41,447	2,600	24 kn (44 km/h; 28 mph)	2002	Fincantieri, Ancona, Italy	Corsica Linea	France	Marseille - Algiers; Marseille - Tunis; Marseille - Ajaccio	
Victoria I	193.80 m (635.8 ft)	40,975	2,500	22 kn (41 km/h; 25 mph)	2004	Aker Finnyards Rauma shipyard, Finland	Tallink	Estonia	Tallinn - Helsinki	
Romantika	193.80 m (635.8 ft)	40,803	2,500	22 kn (41 km/h; 25 mph)	2001	Aker Finnyards Rauma shipyard, Finland	Tallink	Latvia	Tallinn - Stockholm	
Cote D'Opale	215.87 m (708.2 ft)	40,331	1,000	22 knots (41 km/h; 25 mph)	2021	China Merchants Jinling Shipyard(Weihai) Co., Ltd	DFDS Seaways	France	Dover - Calais	
Nordic Pearl	178.40 m (585.3 ft)	40,039	2,200	21 kn (39 km/h; 24 mph)	1989	Wärtsilä Marine Perno Shipyard, Finland	Go Nordic Cruise Line	Denmark	Copenhagen - Frederikshavn - Oslo	
GNV Sirio	214 m (702 ft)	39,780	3,000	29 kn (54 km/h; 33 mph)	2004	Fincantieri, Castellammare di Stabia, Italy	Grandi Navi Veloci	Italy	Napoli / Genova - Palermo Built as Nuraghes	
GNV Auriga	214 m (702 ft)	39,780	3,000	29 kn (54 km/h; 33 mph)	2005	Fincantieri, Castellammare di Stabia, Italy	Grandi Navi Veloci	Italy	Genova / Napoli - Palermo Built as Sharden	
Excelsior	201.20 m (660.1 ft)	39,739	2,000	24 kn (44 km/h; 28 mph)	1999	Fincantieri, Genoa, Italy	Grandi Navi Veloci	Italy	Genoa - Palermo; Genoa - Barcelona - Tangier/Tunis	
Excellent	202.83 m (665.5 ft)	39,739	2,330	24 kn (44 km/h; 28 mph)	1998	Nuovi Cantieri Apuania, Marina di Carrara, Italy	Grandi Navi Veloci	Italy	Genoa - Palermo; Genoa - Barcelona - Tangier/Tunis	
Stena Vision	175.37 m (575.4 ft)	39,178	1,700	21.5 kn (39.8 km/h; 24.7 mph)	1987	Stocznia im. Komuny Paryskiej, Gdynia, Poland	Stena Line	Cyprus	Rosslare - Cherbourg	Formerly Stena Germanica.
Stena Spirit	175.37 m (575.4 ft)	39,178	1,700	21.5 kn (39.8 km/h; 24.7 mph)	1988	Stocznia im. Lenina, Gdańsk, Poland	Stena Line	Cyprus	Karlskrona - Gdynia	
Splendid	214.12 m (702.5 ft)	39,139	2,000	23 kn (43 km/h; 26 mph)	1994	Nuovi Cantieri Apuania, Marina di Carrara, Italy	Grandi Navi Veloci	Italy	Multiple routes from Genoa and Civitavecchia	Originally 188.22 metres (617.5 ft), lengthened 1996
El Venizelos	205.40 m (673.9 ft)	38,261	3,000	22 kn (41 km/h; 25 mph)	1992	Perama, Greece	ANEK Lines	Greece	Multiple routes	
Elyros	192.10 m (630.2 ft)	38,261	2,500	22 kn (41 km/h; 25 mph)	2009	Stocznia im. Komuny Paryskiej, Gdynia, Poland / Perama, Greece	ANEK Lines	Greece	Piraeus - Chania	
Mecklenburg-Vorpommern	199.95 m (656.0 ft)	37,987	887	21 kn (39 km/h; 24 mph)	1996	Schichau Seebeckswerft, Bremerhaven, Germany	Stena Line	Sweden	Rostock - Trelleborg	
Mega Regina	177 m (581 ft)	37,799	2,500	22 kn (41 km/h; 25 mph)	1985	Wärtsilä Perno Shipyard, Turku, Finland	Corsica Ferries	Italy	Toulon/Nice - Corsica	Formerly Mariella with Viking Line
Moby Orli	177 m (581 ft)	37,583	2,500	22 kn (41 km/h; 25 mph)	1986	Wärtsilä Perno Shipyard, Turku, Finland	Moby Lines	Italy	Corsica-Italy	Formerly Olympia with Viking Line and Pride of Bilbao with P&O Ferries.
Kydon Palace	214 m (702 ft)	37,482	2,200	29.5 kn (55 km/h; 34 mph)	2001	Fincantieri, Genoa, Italy	Minoan Lines	Greece	Piraeus - Chania	Formerly Festos Palace. Name changed to Kydon Palace in 2020.
Cruise Bonaira	214 m (702 ft)	37,482	2,200	29.5 kn (55 km/h; 34 mph)	2001	Fincantieri, Genoa, Italy	Grimaldi Lines	Italy	TBC	Formerly Knossos Palace. Name changed to Cruise Bonaria in 2020.
Festos Palace	214 m (702 ft)	36,825	2,182	30 kn (56 km/h; 35 mph)	2002	Fincantieri, Venice, Italy	Minoan Lines	Greece	Piraeus - Heraklion	Formerly Europa Palace. Name changed to Festos Palace in 2020.
Knossos Palace	214 m (702 ft)	36,825	2,182	30 kn (56 km/h; 35 mph)	2001	Fincantieri, Venice, Italy	Minoan Lines	Greece	Piraeus - Heraklion	Formerly Olympia Palace and Cruise Bonaria. Became Knossos Palace in 2020.
SuperSpeed 1	212.8 m (698.2 ft)	36,822	2,315	27 kn (50 km/h; 31 mph)	2008	Aker Finnyards Turku Shipyard / Rauma shipyard, Finland	Color Line	Norway	Kristiansand - Hirtshals	Gross tonnage increased in 2011 following extension of passenger accommodation.
Moby Ale Due	214.6 m (704 ft)	36,475	2,781	29.5 kn (54.6 km/h; 33.9 mph)	2001	Fincantieri, Castellammare di Stabia, Italy	Moby Lines	Italy	Genoa - Olbia/Porto Torres built as Bithia	
Janas	214.6 m (704 ft)	36,475	2,700	28.9 kn (53.5 km/h; 33.3 mph)	2001	Fincantieri, Castellammare di Stabia, Italy	Tirrenia di Navigazione	Italy	Genoa - Olbia/Porto Torres	
Akka	190m (623 ft)	36,468	744	22 kn (41 km/h; 25 mph)	2001	Schichau Seebeckwerft GmbH, Bremerhaven, Germany	TT-Line	Germany	Travemunde - Trelleborg - Rostock	Formerly Nils Nolgersson
Finlandia	175 m (547.2 ft)	36,365	2,080	27 kn (50 km/h; 31 mph)	2001	DSME, Seoul, South Korea	Eckerö Line	Finland	Helsinki - Tallinn	Formerly Moby Freedom
Athara	214.6 m (704 ft)	36,300	2,700	28.9 kn (53.5 km/h; 33.3 mph)	2001	Fincantieri, Castellammare di Stabia, Italy	Tirrenia di Navigazione	Italy	Genoa - Olbia/Porto Torres	
Pascal Lota	177 m (580 ft)	36,299	2,080	27.5 kn (51.0 km/h; 31.6 mph)	2007	Fincantieri, Castellammare di Stabia, Italy	Corsica Ferries	Italy	Toulon - Bastia - Ajaccio; Bastia - Livorno	Formerly M/S Superstar, Tallink
Moby Aki	175 m (547.2 ft)	36,284	2,200	27 kn (50 km/h; 31 mph)	2005	Fincantieri, Castellammare di Stabia, Italy	Moby Lines	Italy	Livorno - Olbia	
James Joyce	186.0 m (610.2 ft)	36,249	1,900	27 kn (50 km/h; 31 mph)	2007	Aker Finnyards, Helsinki Shipyard, Finland	Irish Ferries	Cyprus	Dublin – Holyhead	
Moby Wonder	175 m (547.2 ft)	36,093	2,200	27 kn (50 km/h; 31 mph)	2001	DSME, Seoul, South Korea	Moby Lines	Italy	Livorno - Olbia	
Norröna	161 m (528 ft)	35,966	1,482	21 kn (39 km/h; 24 mph)	2003	Flender Werft, Lübeck, Germany	Smyril Line	Faroe Islands	Hirtshals - Tórshavn - Seyðisfjørður	
Dunkerque Seaways	186.65 m (612.4 ft)	35,923	930	25 kn (46 km/h; 29 mph)	2005	Samsung Heavy Industries, South Korea	DFDS Seaways	United Kingdom	Dover - Dunkerque	
Dover Seaways	186.65 m (612.4 ft)	35,923	930	25 kn (46 km/h; 29 mph)	2005	Samsung Heavy Industries, South Korea	DFDS Seaways	United Kingdom	Dover - Dunkerque	
Delft Seaways	186.65 m (612.4 ft)	35,923	930	25 kn (46 km/h; 29 mph)	2005	Samsung Heavy Industries, South Korea	DFDS Seaways	United Kingdom	Dover - Dunkerque	
Viking XPRS	185 m (606.9 ft)	35,918	2500	25 kn (46 km/h; 29 mph)	2007	Aker Finnyards, Helsinki Shipyard, Finland	Viking Line	Finland	Helsinki - Tallinn	
Mont St Michel	173.95 m (570.7 ft)	35,891	2,123	21 kn (39 km/h; 31 mph)	2002	Van der Giessen de Noord, Krimpen a/d IJssel, Netherlands	Brittany Ferries	France	Caen (Ouistreham) - Portsmouth	
Pascal Paoli	176 m (576 ft)	35,760	550	23 kn (42.6 km/h; 24.5 mph)	2002	Van der Giessen de Noord, Krimpen a/d IJssel, Netherlands	Corsica Linea	France	Marseille - Bastia	
Crown Seaways	171.5 m (563 ft)	35,498	2,136	21.5 kn (39.8 km/h; 24.7 mph)	1994	Brodosplit, Split, Croatia	DFDS Seaways	Denmark	Copenhagen - Frederikshavn - Oslo	
Stena Scandica	222 m (728 ft)	35,456	970	24 kn (44 km/h; 28 mph)	2005	Cantiere Navale Visentini, Donada, Italy	Stena Line	Denmark	Nynäshamn – Ventspils	Originally 186.6 metres (612 ft), lengthened 2021, renamed from Stena Lagan
Stena Baltica	222 m (728 ft)	35,456	970	24 kn (44 km/h; 28 mph)	2005	Cantiere Navale Visentini, Donada, Italy	Stena Line	Denmark	Nynäshamn – Ventspils	Originally 186.6 metres (612 ft), lengthened 2021, renamed from Stena Mersey
Gabriella	171.20 m (561.7 ft)	35,285	2,400	21.5 kn (39.8 km/h; 24.7 mph)	1992	Brodosplit, Split, Croatia	Viking Line	Finland	Stockholm - Mariehamn - Helsinki	
Mega Victoria	169.40 m (555.8 ft)	34,384	2,420	20.5 kn (38.0 km/h; 23.6 mph)	1988	Brodosplit, Split, Croatia	Corsica Ferries	Italy	Corsica-mainland France/Italy	
