= POLSCA Baltic Ferries =

Polish ferry company

POLSCA Baltic Ferries is a Polish maritime ferry operator providing services between Poland and Scandinavia. The company is headquartered in Świnoujście. It was formed in 2026 by merger of Polferries and Unity Line.

== History ==
Operations under the POLSCA brand began on 30 March 2026 after the company POLSCA S.A. was founded by cooperation of 3 major Polish shipping companies - PŻB, PŻM and Euroafrica Shipping Lines, which previously operated ferry services under the Polferries and Unity Line brands respectively. The company took over services on the Świnoujście - Ystad, Świnoujście - Trelleborg, and Gdańsk - Nynashamn routes. On 6 July 2026 POLSCA launched a new route, placing 2 ships on the Gdańsk - Karlshamn line.

== Routes ==
POLSCA Baltic Ferries operate the following routes between Poland and Sweden:

- Świnoujście - Trelleborg
- Świnoujście - Ystad
- Gdańsk - Karlshamn
- Gdańsk - Nynashamn

The routes from Świnoujście serve as a connection from western Poland to Scania, Copenhagen, Malmo, and further on to Gothenburg and Oslo; Gdańsk - Karlshamn plays a similar role for central and eastern Poland, also allowing access to Blekinge. Gdańsk - Nynashamn is Poland's main connection with Stockholm. POLSCA are planning to launch a Trelleborg - Rostock route later in the future.

== Fleet ==
As of summer 2026, POLSCA operate 10 ferries on 4 routes. One ship is chartered to Nouris El Bahr Ferries, whilst 2 are on order from Gdańsk Shipyard.

Current fleet
Name	Built	Gross tonnage	Passengers	Lane meters	Photo	Route
Bursztyn Unity	2026	48626	400	4100		Świnoujście - Ystad
Copernicus	1995	15950	160	1742		Gdańsk - Karlshamn
Epsilon	2011	26375	500	2860		Świnoujście - Trelleborg
Galileusz	1993	15848	125	1742		Świnoujście - Ystad
Jantar Unity	2025	48627	400	4100		Świnoujście - Trelleborg
Mazovia	1996	29940	1000	2620		Świnoujście - Trelleborg (weekdays) Świnoujście - Ystad (weekends)
Nova Star	2011	27744	1215	1575		Gdańsk - Nynashamn
Polonia	1995	29875	918	1716		Świnoujście - Ystad
Skania	1995	23933	1397	2135		Gdańsk - Karlshamn
Varsovia	2024	41878	936	2875		Świnoujście - Ystad
Wawel	1980	25318	1000	1490		Gdańsk - Nynashamn

On charter
Name	Built	Gross tonnage	Passengers	Lane meters	Photo	Route	Operator
Cracovia	2002	25028	650	2196		Algiers - Marseille Algiers - Alicante Oran - Alicante	Nouris El Bahr Ferries

Future fleet
Name	Delivery	Gross tonnage	Passengers	Lane meters
Amber Unity	2029	47626	400	4100
