= MF Galileusz =

Polish ro pax ferry

- Galileusz at Świnoujście

History
- Name: 1993–2006: Via Tirreno; 2006 onwards: Galileusz
- Namesake: Galileo Galilei
- Operator: 1993-6: Viamare di Navigazione; 1996-2001: Tirrenia; 2001-6: Adriatica di Navigazione; 2006-2026: Unity Line; 2026 onwards: POLSCA Baltic Ferries
- Port of registry: Limassol, Cyprus
- Route: Świnoujście - Ystad
- Builder: Van der Giessen de Noord
- In service: 1993
- Identification: IMO number: 9019078

General characteristics
- Class & type: Ferry
- Tonnage: 14,398 GT
- Length: 150.38 m (493 ft 4 in)
- Beam: 23.4 m (76 ft 9 in)
- Draught: 6 m (19 ft 8 in)
- Installed power: 2 × GMT-Sulzer 8ZAL40S
- Speed: 19 knots (35 km/h; 22 mph)
- Capacity: 50 passengers

General characteristics (as "Galileusz")
- Tonnage: 15,848 GT
- Capacity: 125 pax; 1,742 lm
- Notes: otherwise as built

MF Galileusz is a ropax ferry operated by POLSCA Baltic Ferries on the Świnoujście - Ystad line.

== Namesake ==
Galileusz is named after XVI-century Italian astronomer and polymath Galileo Galilei

== History ==
Galileusz was built in 1993 by Van der Giessen de Noord as Via Tirreno for Viamare di Navigazione for Mediterranean operations. Viamare was later incorporated into Tirrenia. From 2001 until 2006 the vessel operated for Adriatica di Navigazione (a Tirrenia subsidiary from 2004). In 2006 she underwent a rebuilt and was bought by Euro Africa Shipping and operated between Poland and Sweden under the Unity Line brand. As of 2026 she sails for Unity Line's successor POLSCA Baltic Ferries between Świnoujście and Ystad. In August 2026 the ship gained the POLSCA livery. In November 2026, whilst moored at Trelleborg harbour, the ship encountered an inter-deck ramp failure, which resulted in the injury of a truck driver. Following repair, the vessel departed for Świnoujście.

== Gallery ==
Galileusz and Polonia

Galileusz departing Świnoujście

Galileusz at night

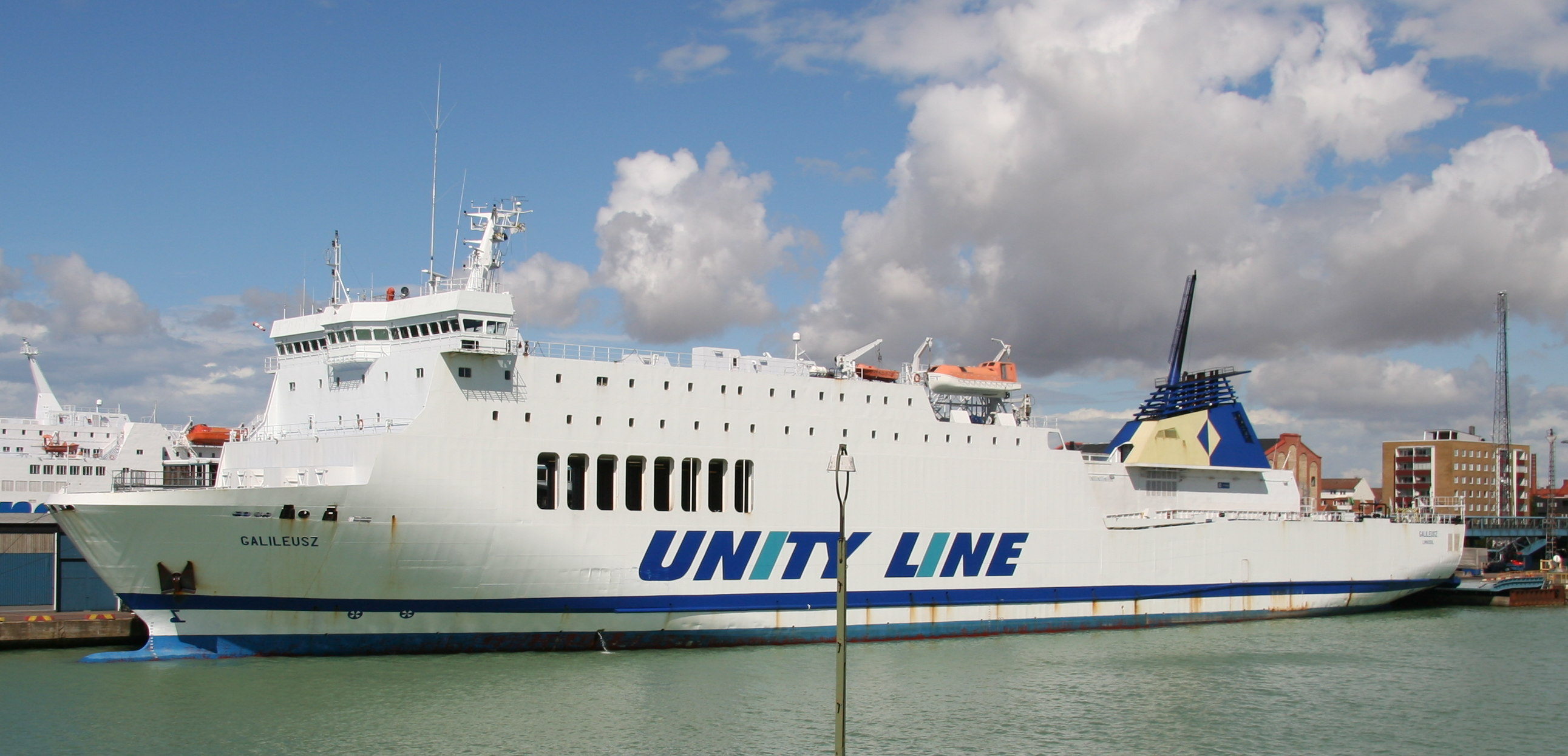
Galileusz in Trelleborg harbour

Galileusz in Świnoujście harbour

== Sisters ==
- MF Copernicus
- MF Denia Ciutat Creativa
- MF Lider Prestij
- MF Marco Polo
- MF Amal
- MF Drujba
