= MS Epsilon =

ROPAX ferry

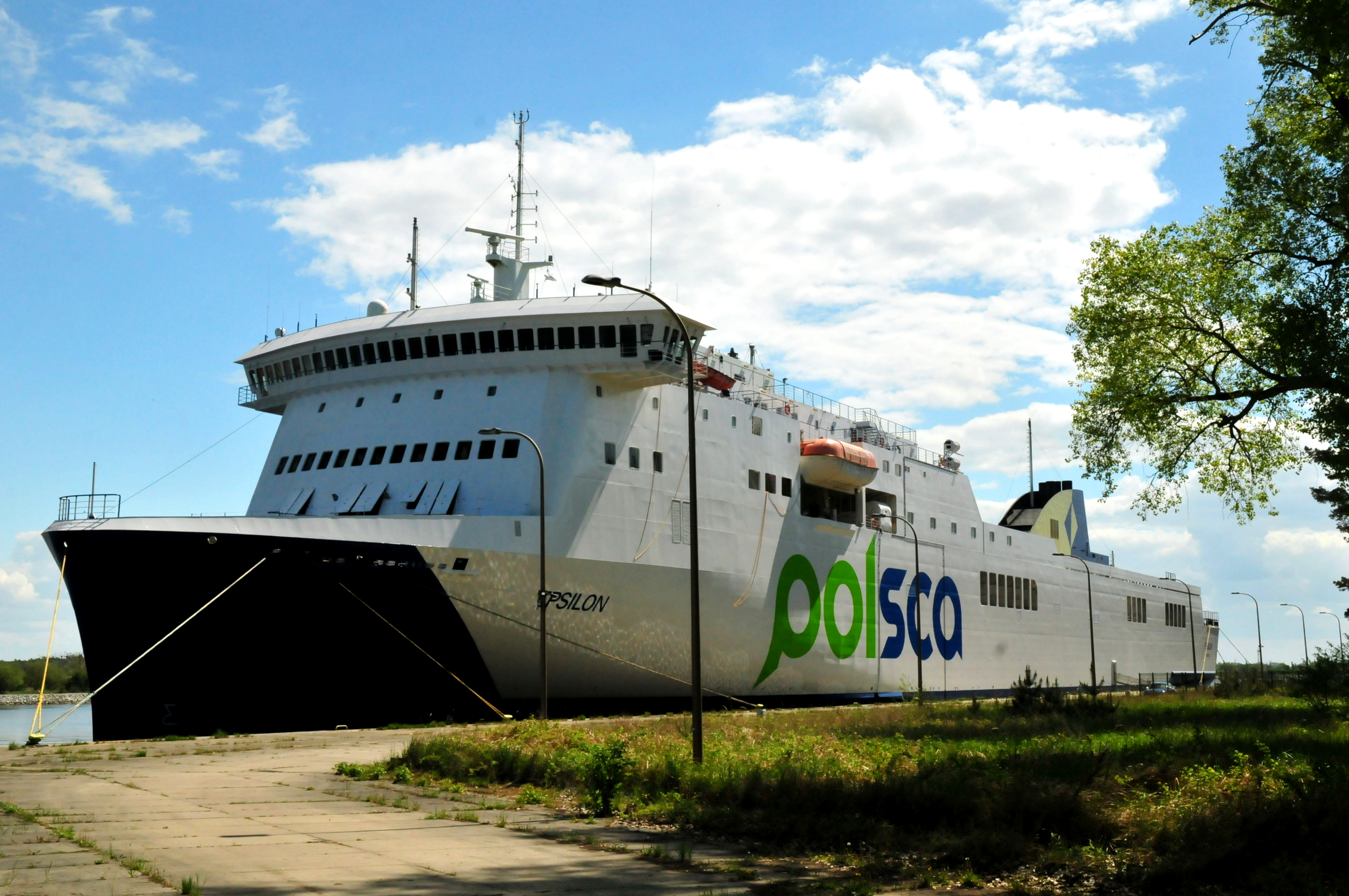

History
- Name: 2011-2014: Cartour Epsilon; 2014 onwards: Epsilon
- Owner: 2011-2023: Euroafrica Shipping; 2023 onwards: Unity Line
- Operator: 2011-2014: Caronte & Tourist; 2014-2023: Irish Ferries; 2024-2026 Unity Line; 2026- POLSCA Baltic Ferries
- Port of registry: 2011 onwards: Limassol,Cyprus
- Route: Świnoujście - Trelleborg
- Builder: Cantieri Navale Visentini
- Yard number: 228
- Identification: IMO number: 9539054
- Status: In service

General characteristics
- Tonnage: 26,375 GT
- Length: 186.50 m (611.9 ft)
- Beam: 25.60 m (84.0 ft)
- Draught: 6.85 m (22.5 ft)
- Decks: 7: 4 freight decks and 3 passenger decks.
- Installed power: 2 x MAN B&W 9L48/60 diesel engines
- Propulsion: 2 x Controllable pitch propellers
- Speed: 24 knots (44 km/h)
- Capacity: 2,860 Lane Meters; 70 cars; 500 passengers; 270 berths

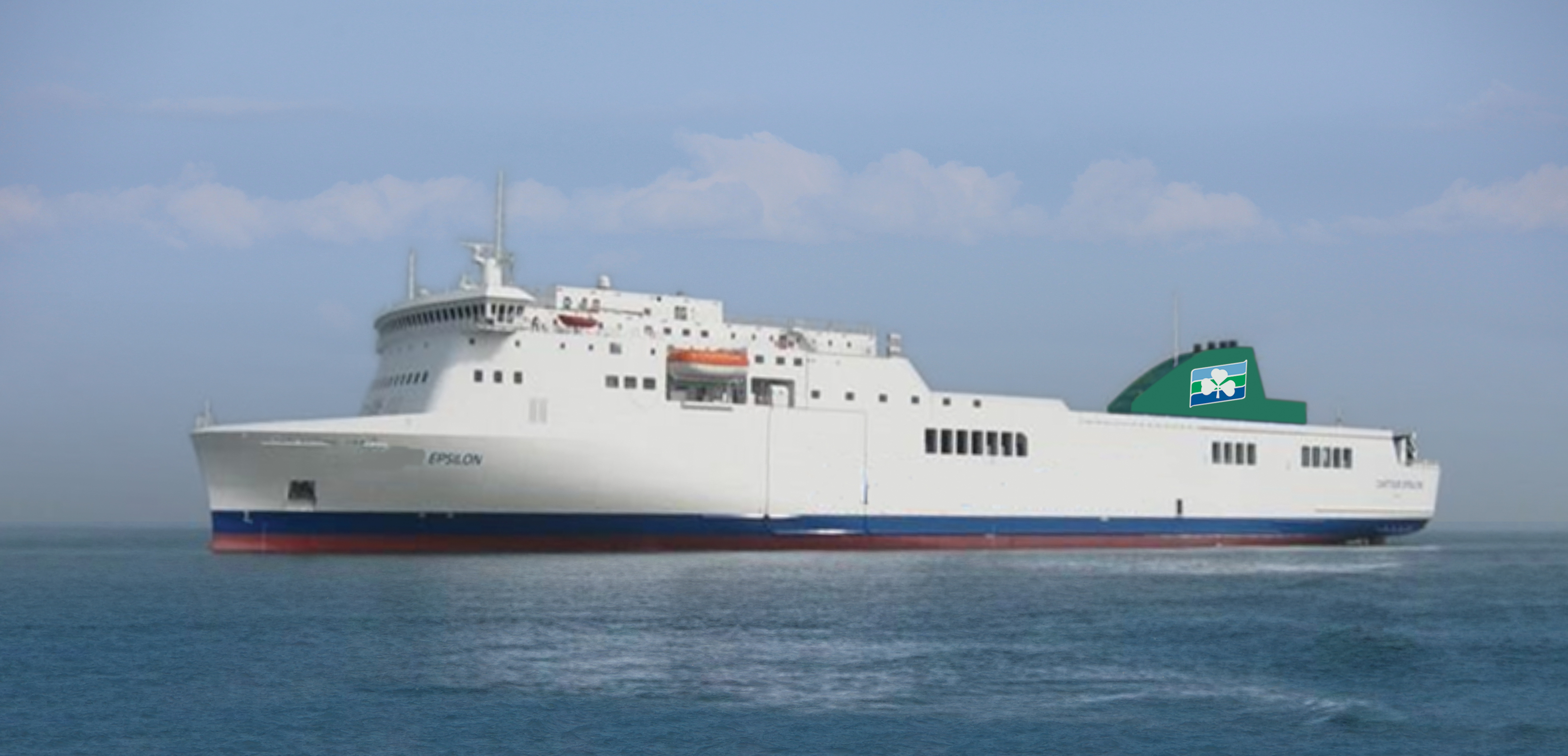
Epsilon with Irish Ferries

Epsilon is a ROPAX ferry that operates for POLSCA Baltic Ferries on the Baltic Sea.

== History ==
The Cartour Epsilon was delivered in 2011 to Sicilian ferry operator Caronte & Tourist.

=== Irish Ferries ===
In 2013, the Epsilon was chartered to Irish Ferries to expand their Dublin–Holyhead route, crossing the route twice a day from Tuesday to Saturday, opposite the Stena Superfast X, before running Dublin–Cherbourg from Saturday and returning to Dublin.

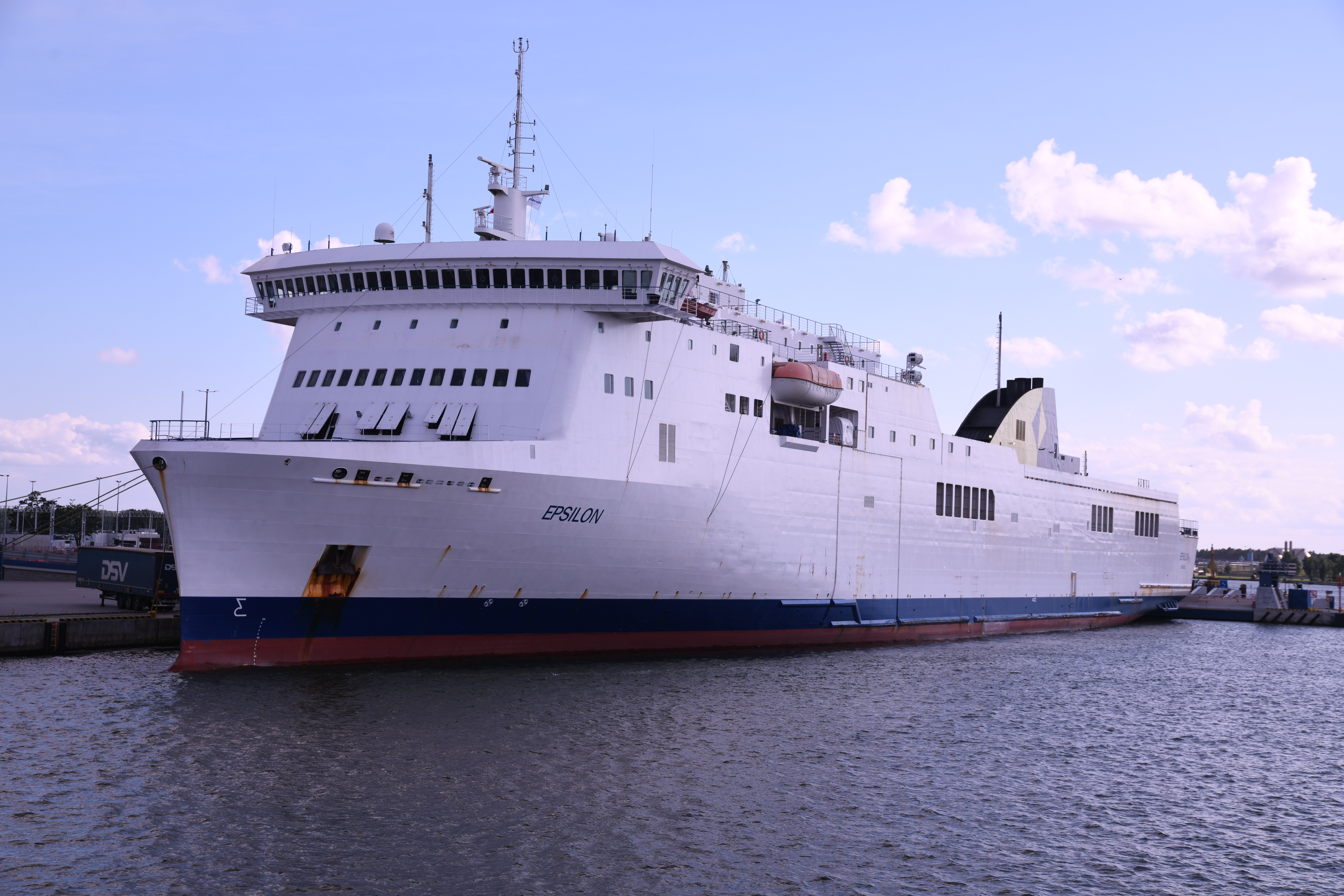
Epsilon in Unity Line livery

On 11 February 2016, Epsilon sustained damage to her cargo, after sailing into Storm Imogen while en route from Cherbourg to Dublin. Afloat.ie reported that the ship met steady forecasted wind speeds of 60 knots, with gusts of up to 105 knots (almost 200 km/h) at times.

Her charter ended on 4 December 2023, the ferry had already been sold to Unity Line.

=== Unity Line ===
MS Epsilon entered service with Polish operator Unity Line in January 2024 on the Świnoujście - Trelleborg route. On 30 January 2024 Epsilon collided with quay no.7 during mooring maneuvers at Trelleborg port in heavy fog. No human injuries were sustained, however the vessel had to be docked.

=== POLSCA Baltic Ferries ===
After the consolidation of Unity Line and Polferries under the POLSCA brand, the ship continued service on the same route with her new operator. In April 2026 she received the POLSCA livery.

== Characteristics ==
The vessel has capacity for 500 passengers and 2860 lane metres.
