= Bursztyn Unity =

Polish RoPax ferry built in 2026

- Bursztyn Unity at Szczecin

History
- Name: Bursztyn Unity
- Operator: POLSCA Baltic Ferries
- Port of registry: Szczecin, Poland
- Route: Świnoujście - Ystad
- Builder: Remontowa
- In service: 18 November 2026
- Identification: IMO number: 9989900

General characteristics
- Type: Ferry
- Tonnage: 48,626 GT
- Length: 195.6 m (641 ft 9 in)
- Beam: 31.6 m (103 ft 8 in)
- Draught: 6.3 m (20 ft 8 in)
- Installed power: 4 × Wärtsilä 31DF
- Speed: 19 knots (35 km/h; 22 mph)
- Capacity: 400 passengers; 400 berths; 200 cabins; 75 airliner seats; 200 cars; 4,100 lane meters
- Crew: 50

Bursztyn Unity is a ropax ferry operating for POLSCA Baltic Ferries on the Świnoujście - Ystad route. She is the first Polish-flagged maritime ferry since Pomerania switched flag to Bahama in 2004.

== Namesake ==
Bursztyn means amber in Polish. The same naming convention is used in relation to Bursztyn Unity's sisters, Jantar Unity and Amber Unity ("jantar" pol. lit. amber). The "Unity" part refers to POLSCA's predecessor Unity Line, for which the ship was originally ordered.

== Characteristics ==
Bursztyn Unity is a LNG/diesel-powered ship, equipped with four Wärtsilä 31DF engines, two bow azipods, and two electric stern thrusters, which increase port maneuverability. She can capacitate 400 passengers and 4,100 lane meters of freight.

== History ==
Bursztyn Unity was christened in Szczecin on Independence Day 2026. Szczecin is also her port of registry. She is the second of three sister-ships.
