= MF Polonia =

History
- Name: Polonia
- Operator: 1995-2026: Unity Line; 2026 onwards: POLSCA Baltic Ferries
- Port of registry: Limassol, Cyprus
- Route: Świnoujście - Ystad
- Builder: Längsten Verft
- In service: 1995
- Identification: IMO number: 9108350

General characteristics
- Tonnage: 29,875 GT
- Length: 169.9 m
- Beam: 28 m
- Draught: 6.21 m
- Installed power: 4x Stork Wartsila 6SW38
- Speed: 20.2 kn
- Capacity: 918 passengers; 618 berths; 1716 lane meters; 740 rail lane meters

MF Polonia is a ropax ferry operating for POLSCA Baltic Ferries between Świnoujście and Ystad.

== History ==
Polonia was ordered in Längsten Shipyard, Norway for Unity Line. Delivered in 1995, she was placed on the Świnoujście - Ystad route which she continues to ply to date, from 2026 with POLSCA. At the time of delivery, she was the largest train ferry in the world. As of 2026 this title belongs to MS Skane.
