= MV Nova Star =

Cruiseferry built in 2011

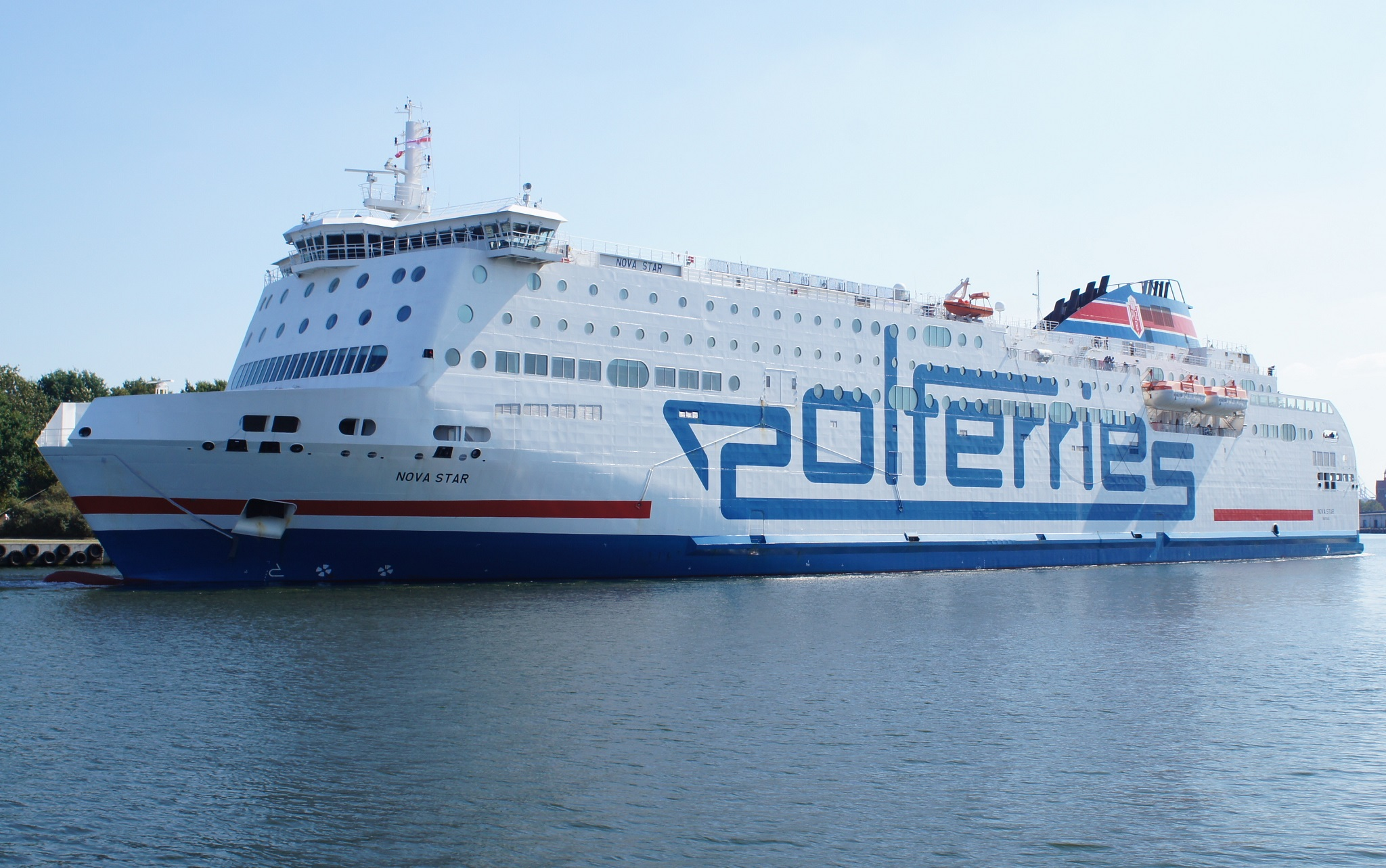
- Nova Star in Gdańsk, Poland

History
- Name: Nova Star (2014–present); Norman Leader (2011–2014)
- Owner: Polferries (2018–present); Inter Shipping (2016–2017); Nova Star Cruises (2014–2015); ST Marine (2011–2014)
- Operator: POLSCA Baltic Ferries (2026-present); Polferries (2018–2026); Inter Shipping (2016–2017); Nova Star Cruises (2014–2015)
- Port of registry: Nassau, Bahamas
- Route: Gdańsk–Nynäshamn (2018–present); Algeciras-Tangier (2016–2017); Portland-Yarmouth (2014–2015)
- Ordered: 2008
- Builder: Singapore Technologies Shipbuilding, Singapore
- Laid down: 2008
- Launched: 8 October 2009
- Christened: 2011
- Completed: 2011
- Acquired: 2014
- Maiden voyage: 15 May 2014
- In service: 2014–2015
- Identification: IMO number: 9462067; MMSI number: 311000199; Callsign: C6AZ4

General characteristics
- Tonnage: 27,444 GT 4,145 DWT
- Length: 161 m (528 ft)
- Beam: 26 m (85 ft)
- Draught: 6.2 m (20 ft)
- Ramps: 1 bow ramp; 2 stern ramp on deck 3 and 5; 1 tiltable ramp connecting Deck 3 to Deck 5
- Installed power: 4× MAN Diesel 10L32/44CR Diesel engines, 22,400 kW (30,000 hp) total
- Propulsion: 2 shafts, 2 controllable pitch propellers
- Speed: 21.4 kn (24.6 mph; 39.6 km/h)
- Capacity: 1,215 passengers; 648 berths; 200 cars; 1,575 lane meters

Nova Star is a roll-on/roll-off cruiseferry, currently operating between Poland and Scandinavia under the ownership of POLSCA Baltic Ferries.

== Construction and service history ==
The vessel was built by ST Marine in Singapore for LD Lines, which signed a $179 million contract for the vessel in 2007. She was intended to operate in the English Channel, but her contract was canceled in 2011 before she could take her maiden voyage to France.

Initially named Norman Leader, the vessel remained under the ownership of her builder, ST Marine, until being acquired by Nova Star Cruises in 2014 and renamed Nova Star for the Gulf of Maine service. She ran seasonal operations between Portland, Maine and Yarmouth, Nova Scotia, under Nova Star Cruises for two seasons. Following the decision not to renew Nova Star Cruises' license to operate the service at the end of the 2015 season, Nova Star Cruises subsequently closed and Gulf of Maine operations were taken over by Bay Ferries, which has previously operated ferries in the region prior to Nova Star Cruises.

Once her Gulf of Maine service ended, Nova Star was purchased by the Moroccan company Inter Shipping. Following her arrival in Algeciras in February 2016, it was made apparent that Nova Star's bow ramp was too short to operate the service, therefore delaying her entry into service. She eventually began operating between Algeciras, Spain and Tangier, Morocco under the ownership and operation of Inter Shipping. She ran this route until 2018, when she was then purchased by Polferries, who operated her on the route between Poland and Scandinavia. In 2026 she continued operation on the route with POLSCA.

== Vessel technical details ==
Nova Star is an average-sized cruiseferry. Her dimensions are 161 m (528 ft) length by 25 m (82 ft) width. The vessel is capable of a top speed of 21 kn (39 km/h), and weighs roughly 27,450 GT.

The vessel has 163 cabins and a capacity of 1,215 passengers. The vehicle decks provide 1575 lane meters, so the vessel can carry 336 car-equivalents and/or 38 commercial vehicles (semi-trailer rigs or buses) and commensurately fewer cars.

== Recorded videos during service in Polferries ==
The ferry has been featured in numerous videos showcasing the crew's work on it. The most popular ones include videos recorded by Robert Makłowicz and Iwona Blecharczyk. Apart from Polish Journalists and YouTubers, the ferry was also recorded the opening of first episode of the fifth season of The Grand Tour, featuring the popular trio Jeremy Clarkson, Richard Hammond and James May. A voyage on board the ferry has also been featured in a YouTube video by British travel YouTuber Steve Marsh, gaining over 400,000 views.
