= Jantar Unity =

Ropax ferry

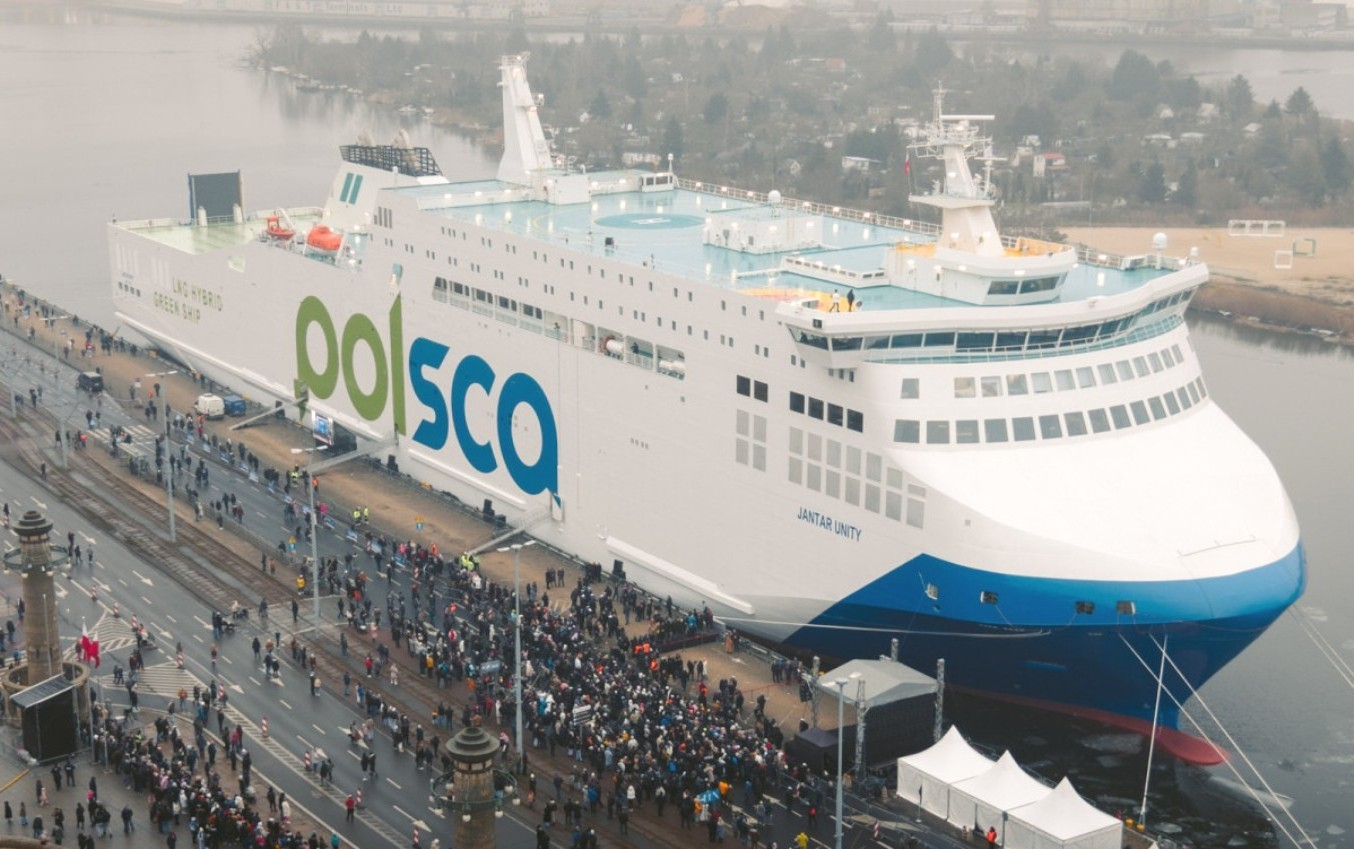
- Jantar Unity at Szczecin

History
- Name: Jantar Unity
- Operator: POLSCA Baltic Ferries
- Port of registry: Limassol, Cyprus
- Route: Świnoujście - Trelleborg
- Builder: Remontowa
- In service: 20 January 2026
- Identification: IMO number: 9989895

General characteristics
- Type: Ferry
- Tonnage: 48,626 GT
- Length: 195.6 m (641 ft 9 in)
- Beam: 31.6 m (103 ft 8 in)
- Draught: 6.3 m (20 ft 8 in)
- Installed power: 4 × Wärtsilä 31DF
- Speed: 19 knots (35 km/h; 22 mph)
- Capacity: 400 passengers; 400 berths; 200 cabins; 75 airliner seats; 200 cars; 4,100 lane meters
- Crew: 50

Jantar Unity is a ropax ferry operating for POLSCA Baltic Ferries on the route from Świnoujście to Trelleborg. At over 48,000 gross tonnage (GT) she is the largest vessel in the POLSCA fleet.

== Namesake ==
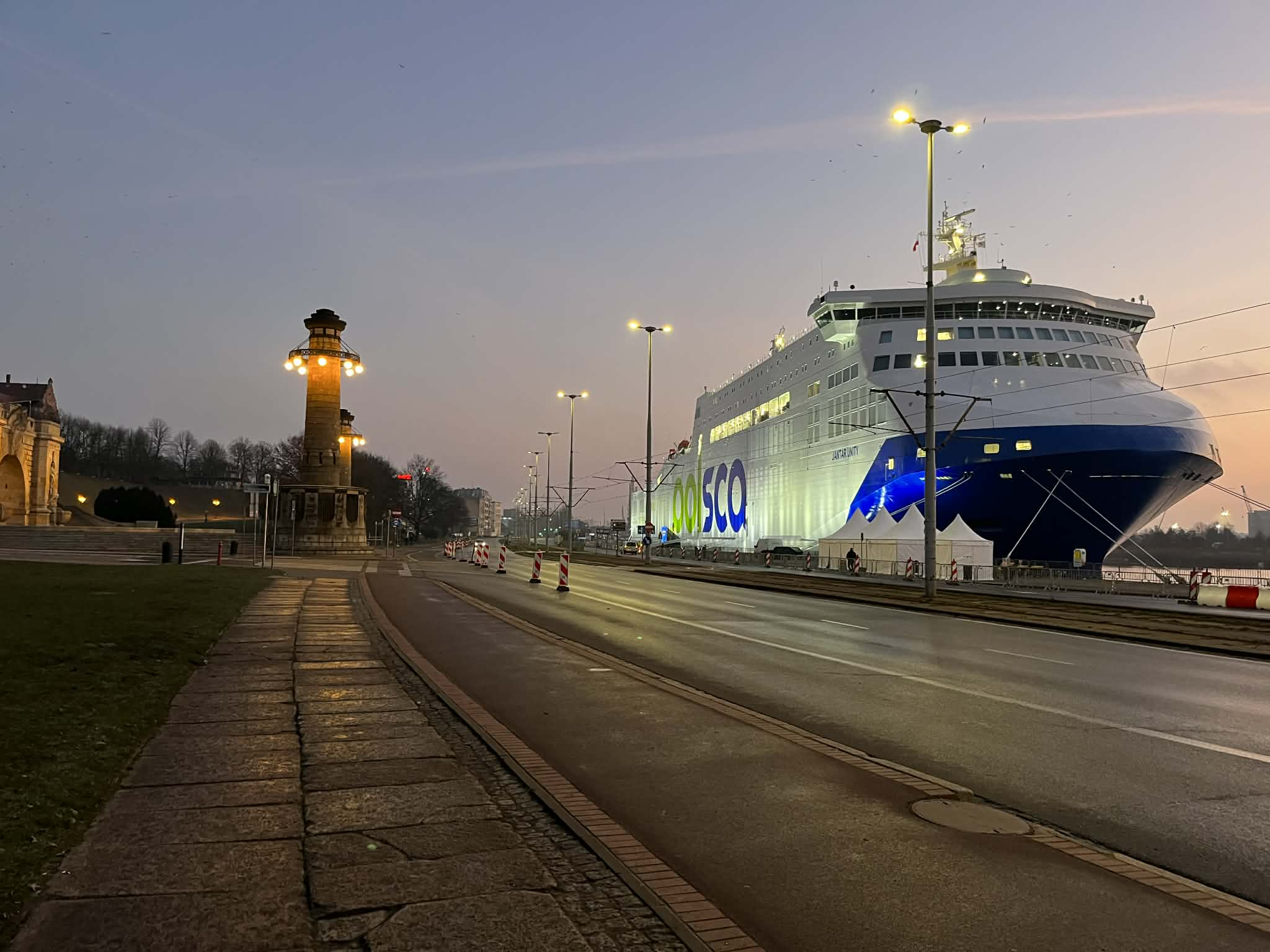

Jantar is a Polish literary term for amber; the same naming convention is used in relation to Jantar Unity's sisters, Bursztyn Unity and Amber Unity ("bursztyn" pol. amber). The "Unity" part refers to the ship's initial operator, Unity Line, now incorporated into POLSCA.

== History ==
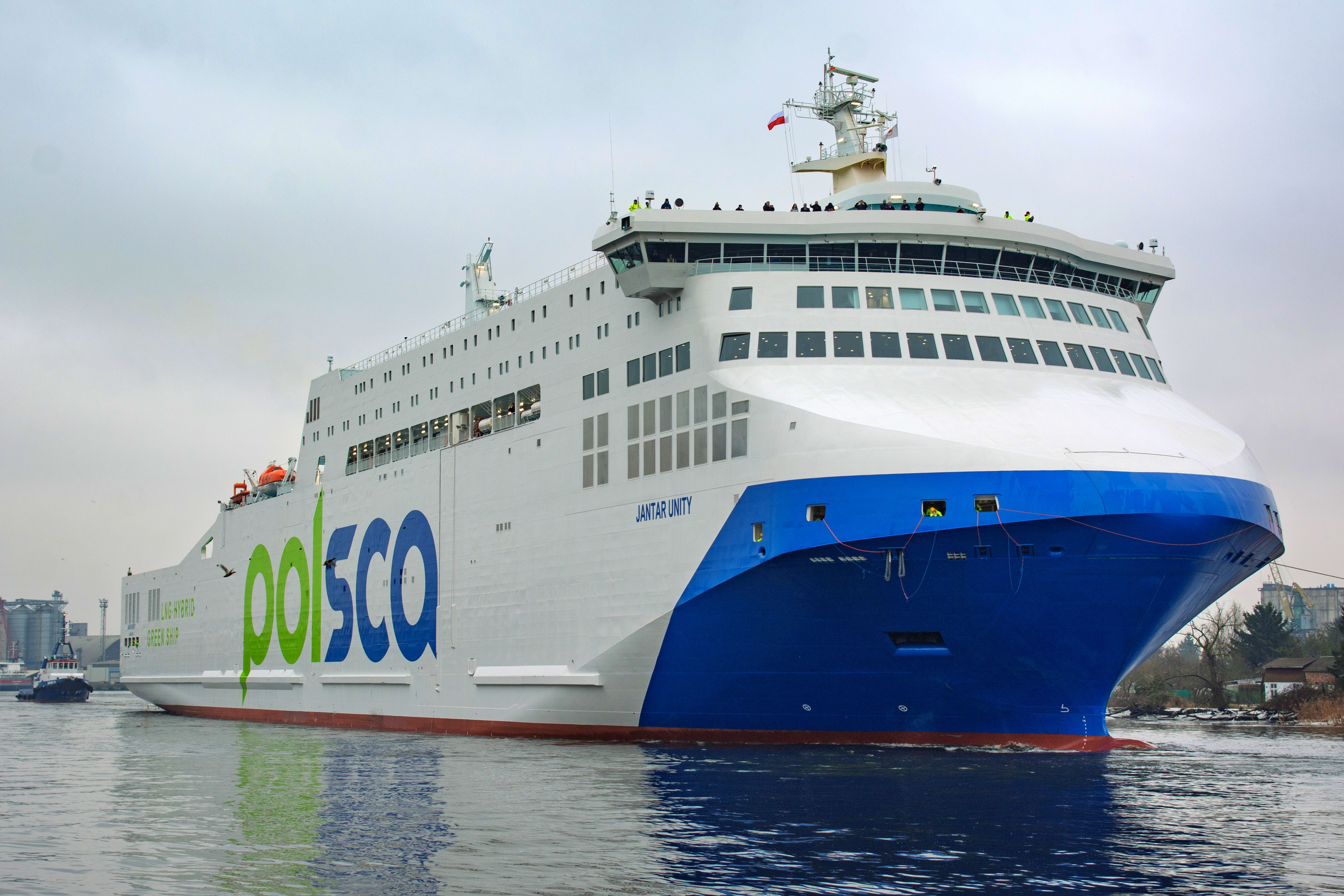

Built in 2025 by Gdańsk Shipyard, Jantar Unity is the first Polish new national-built maritime ferry in 46 years, since the completion of MF Silesia in 1979. Jantar Unity underwent sea trials in Autumn 2025, and was christened in Szczecin on 17 January 2026. She entered service with Unity Line on the Świnoujście – Trelleborg route, already in the POLSCA livery.

== Characteristics ==
Jantar Unity is a LNG/diesel-powered ship, equipped with four Wärtsilä 31DF engines, two bow azipods, and two electric stern thrusters, which increase port maneuverability. She can capacitate 400 passengers and 4,100 lane meters of freight.
