= Rhapsody (ship) =

French cruiseferry

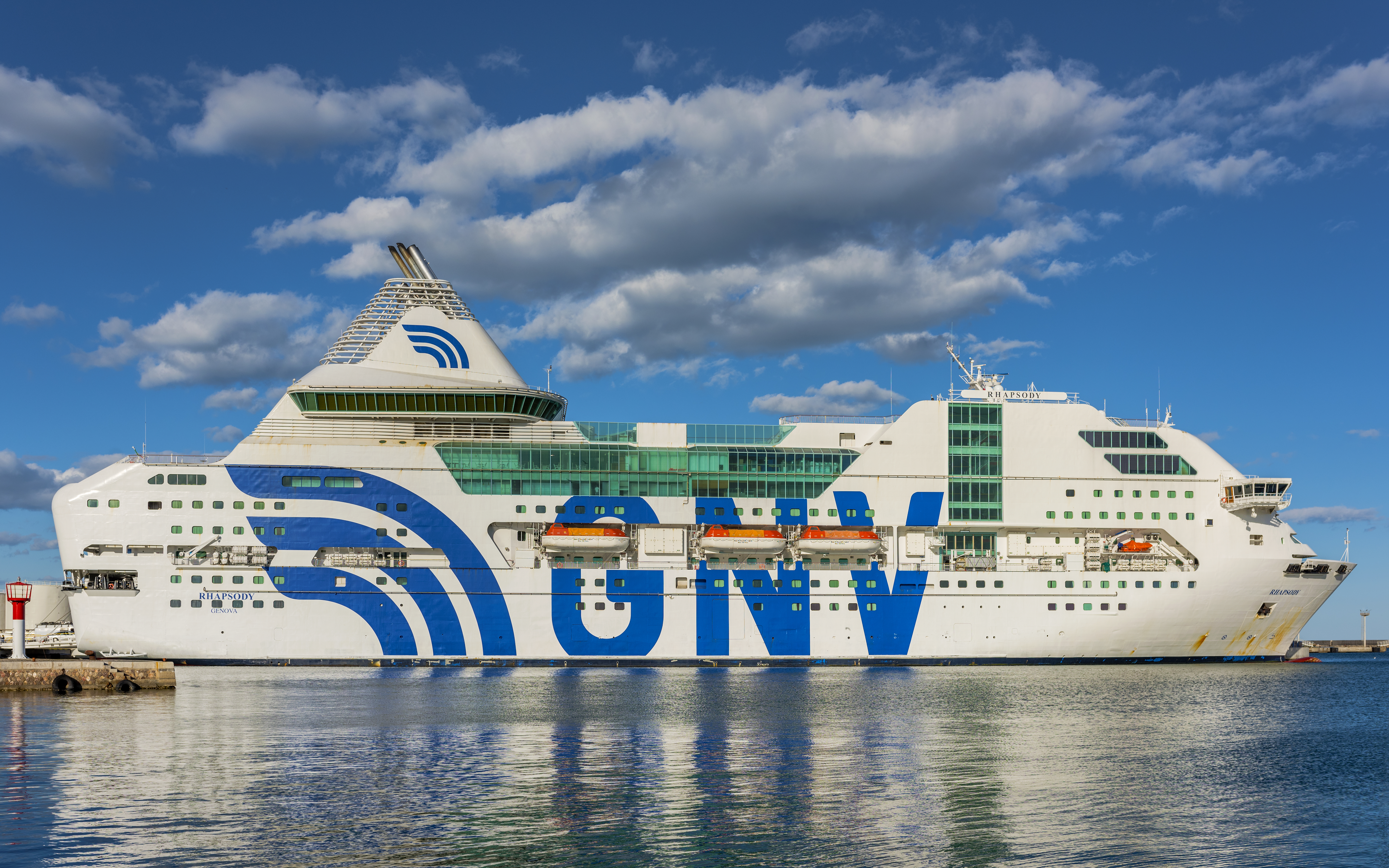
- MS Rhapsody in Sete

History
- Name: 1996–2014: Napoleon Bonaparte; 2014–onwards: Rhapsody
- Owner: 1996–2014: SNCM; 2014–onwards: MSC
- Operator: 1996–2014: SNCM; 2014–onwards: Grandi Navi Veloci
- Port of registry: 1996–2014: Ajaccio, France; 2014–2016: Valletta, Malta; 2016–onwards: Genoa, Italy
- Ordered: 24 February 1994
- Builder: Chantiers de l'Atlantique, Saint-Nazaire, France
- Cost: F1,1 Billions
- Yard number: D31
- Laid down: 13 February 1995
- Launched: 16 September 1995
- Acquired: 4 April 1996
- Maiden voyage: 26 April 1996
- In service: 1996–present
- Identification: Call sign: 1996–2014: FNNB; 2014–2016: 9HA3648; 2016–onwards: IBME; IMO number: 9104835; MMSI number: 247362600
- Status: In the shipyard in Marseille

General characteristics
- Type: Cruiseferry
- Tonnage: 44,307 GT
- Length: 172 m (564 ft 4 in)
- Beam: 30.4 m (99 ft 9 in)
- Draught: 6.7 m (22 ft 0 in)
- Installed power: 4 × SEMT Pielstick 18PC2.6B; 43,000 kW (combined)
- Propulsion: Two shafts; controllable pitch propellers
- Speed: 23.8 knots (44.1 km/h; 27.4 mph)
- Capacity: 2,650 passengers; 2,220 passenger beds; 708 vehicles
- Crew: 179

MS Rhapsody, is an Italian cruiseferry operated by Grandi Navi Veloci. She was built at Chantiers de l'Atlantique in Saint-Nazaire, France for the French ferry operator SNCM as Napoleon Bonaparte. In 1996, she was put on the Marseille–Corsica route, replacing the old ferry Napoleon which was moved to the Marseille–Algeria–Tunisia route. On October 27, 2012, the ship broke its moorings in the port of Marseille due to strong winds, violently struck the dock, and sank in the harbour. Due to its financial difficulties, SNCM was unable to repair the ferry, and sold it to the Italian shipowner MSC in 2014. Refloated, the ship was renamed Rhapsody and transferred to Grandi Navi Veloci to sail first between Italy and Albania, and then from 2017 on the Genoa-Porto Torres route.

== See also ==
- Largest ferries of Europe
