= MF Mazovia =

Ropax ferry built in 1996

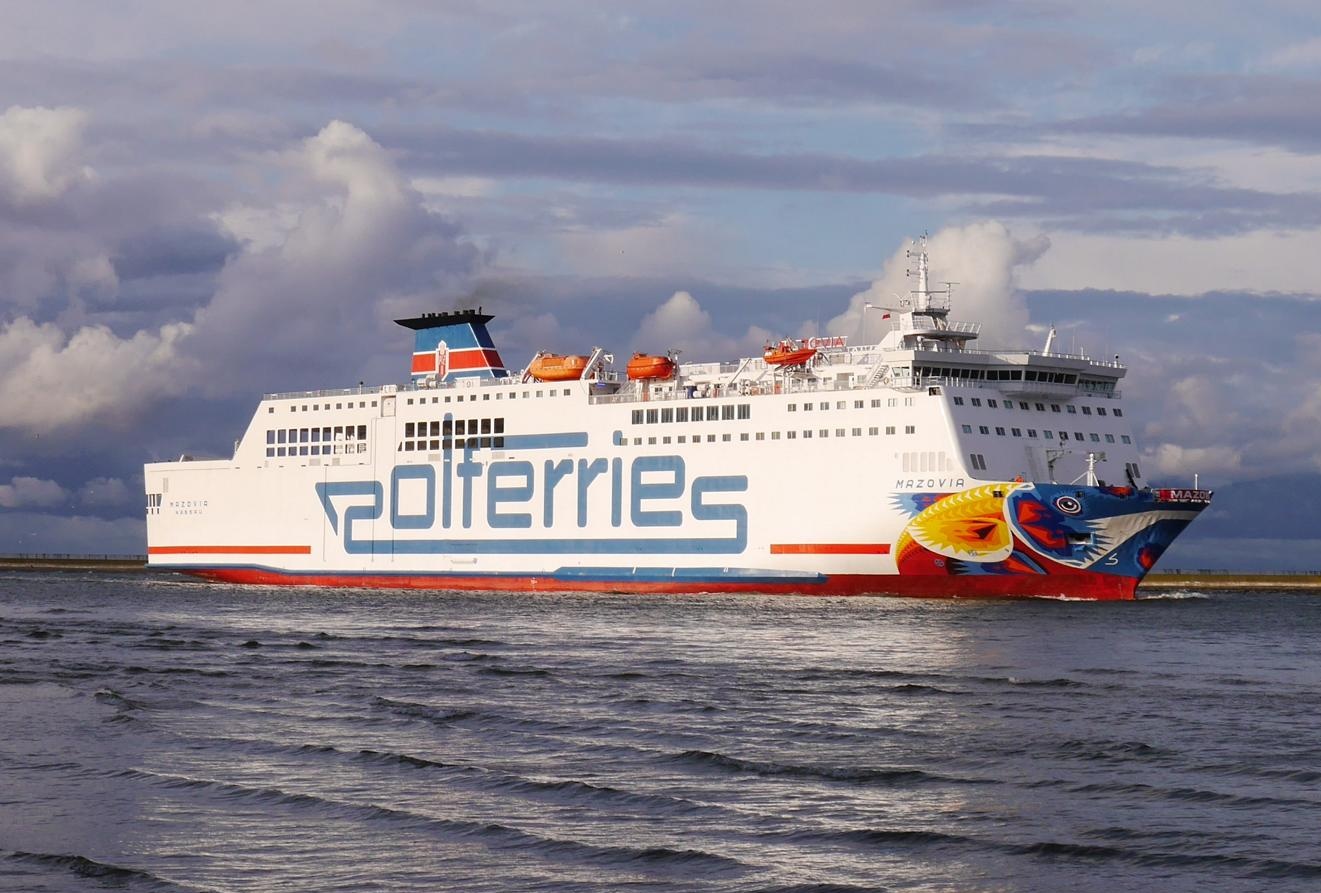

History
- Name: 1996-7: Gotland; 1997-2013: Finnarrow; 2013-2014: Euroferry Brindisi; 2014 onwards: Mazovia
- Namesake: Mazovia
- Operator: 1997: Tor Line; 1997-2013: Finnlines / Finnlink/ Nordö Link; 2007-2011, 2013: Stena Line; 2013-2014: Grimaldi Lines; 2014-2026: Polferries; 2026 onwards: POLSCA Baltic Ferries
- Port of registry: Nassau, Bahamas
- Route: Świnoujście - Trelleborg; Świnoujście - Ystad
- Builder: P.T. Pelita Bahari
- In service: 1997
- Identification: IMO number: 9010814

General characteristics (as built)
- Tonnage: 25,996 GT
- Length: 168.15 m
- Beam: 27.7 m
- Draught: 6 m
- Installed power: 4x Sulzer 6ZA40S
- Speed: 21 kn
- Capacity: 200 passengers; 188 berths; 2400 lane meters

General characteristics (after 2012 rebuilt)
- Tonnage: 29,100 GT
- Capacity: 572 pax; 188 berths; 2620 lm
- Notes: otherwise as built

General characteristics (after 2015 rebuilt)
- Tonnage: 29,940 GT
- Capacity: 1000 pax; 506 berths; 2620 lm
- Notes: otherwise as built

MF Mazovia is a ropax ferry sailing for POLSCA Baltic Ferries between Poland and Sweden.

== History ==
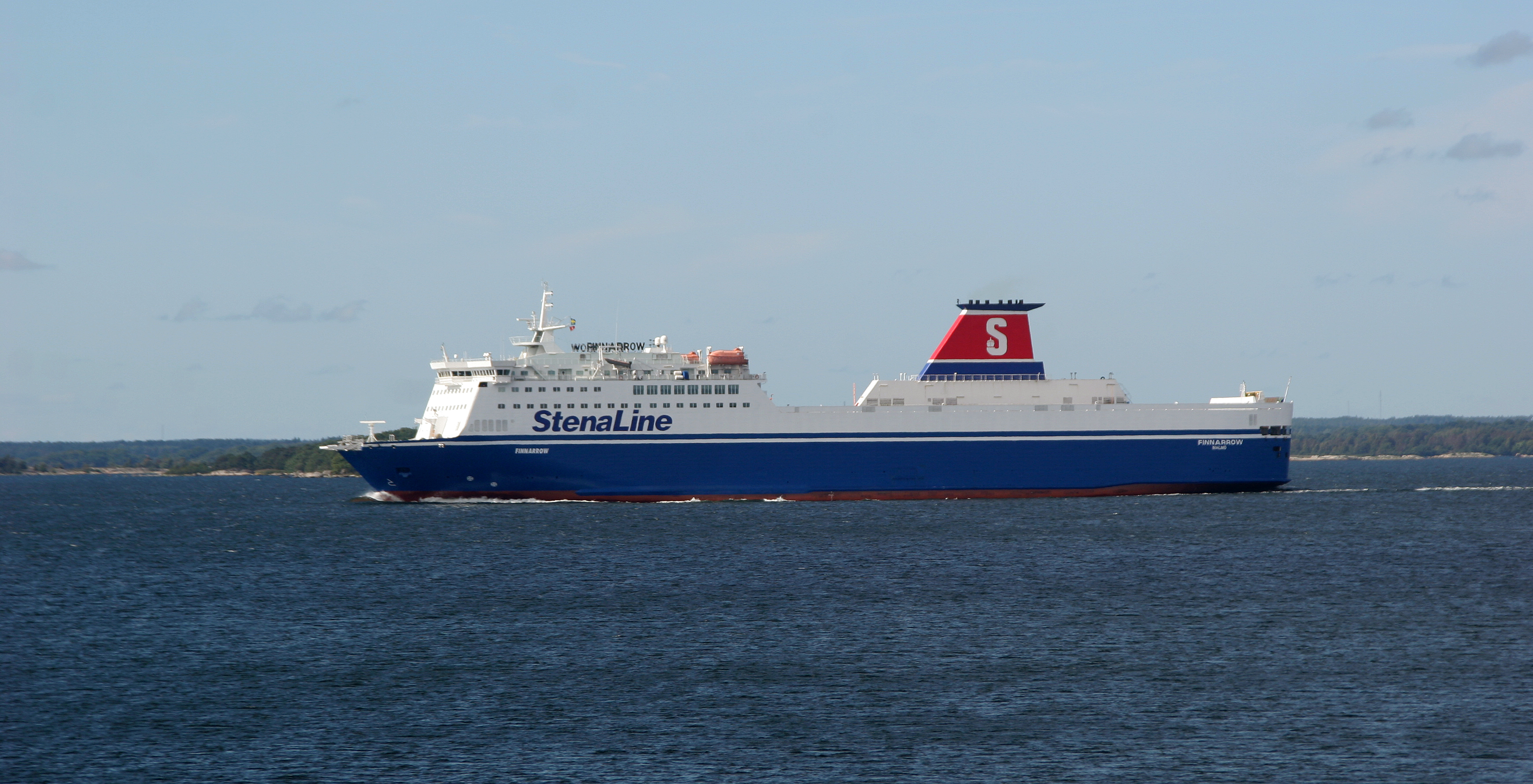
As built with Stena Line as Finnarrow

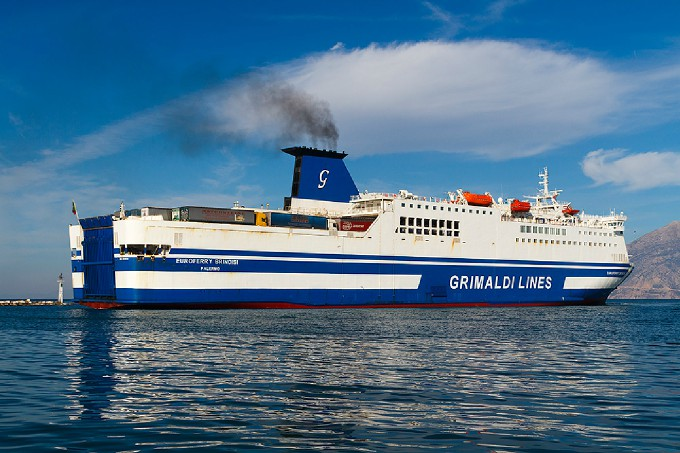
After first refit with Grimaldi Lines as Euroferry Brindisi

Built in Indonesia in 1996 as Gotland for Rederi AB Gotland, the ship first sailed for Tor Line. Finnlines bought her in 1997 and renamed her Finnarrow. She sailed for Finnlines, FinnLink, Nordö-Link and other operators, mainly on the Baltic Sea. Between 2007 and 2011 she sailed for Stena Line on their Gdynia - Karlskrona route. In 2012 she underwent a significant refit, which increased her capacity. In 2013 and 2014 Grimaldi Lines ran her as Euroferry Brindisi. In October 2014 a Finnlines subsidiary agreed to sell her for €32.5 million. Her new owner, Polferries, renamed her Mazovia and had her rebuilt at the former Szczecin Shipyard, adding passenger cabins on the upper decks aft and refurbishing the public areas. The work was finished in mid-June 2015. She then replaced Wawel on the Świnoujście - Ystad route. As of 2026 she sails with POLSCA Baltic Ferries from Świnoujście to Trelleborg on weekdays and from Świnoujście to Ystad on weekends.
