= MV Marco Polo (1993) =

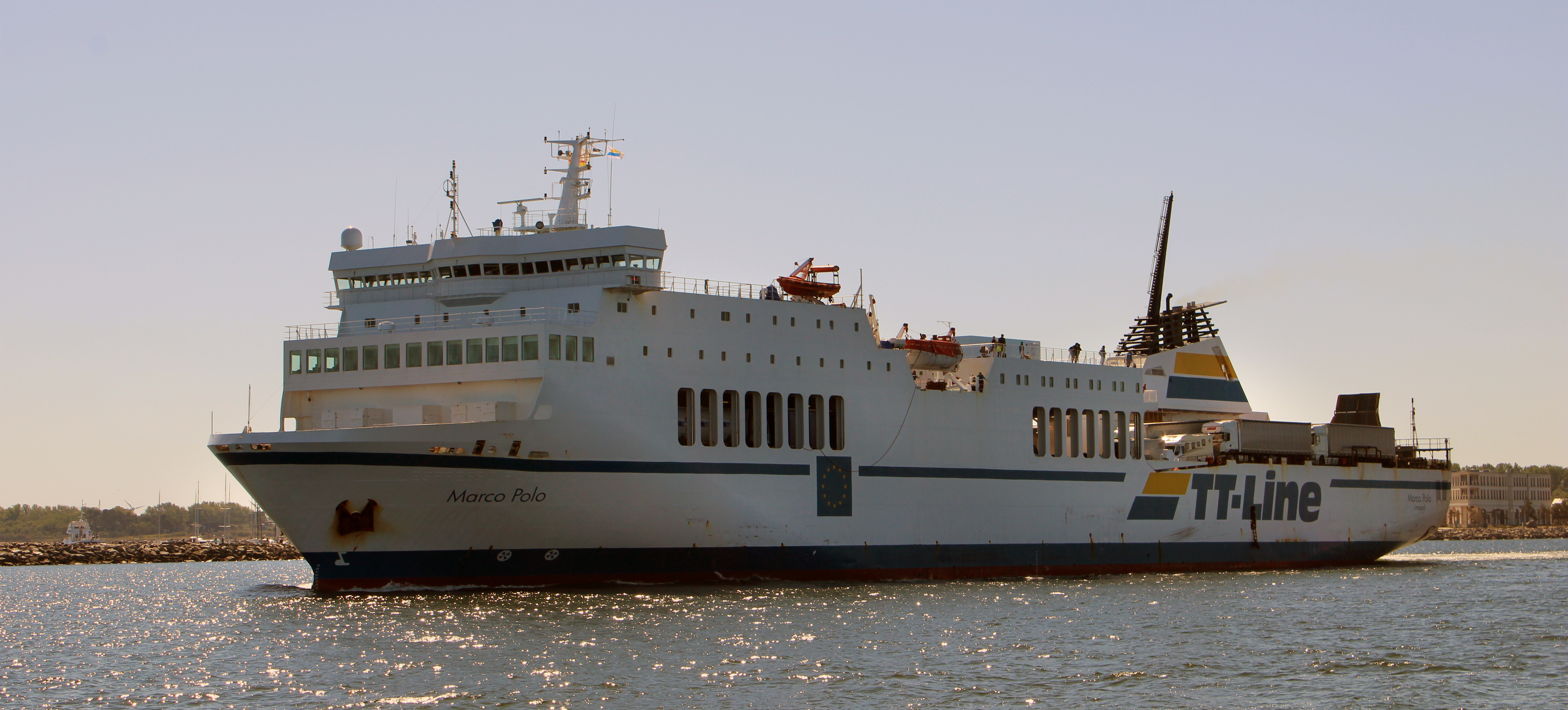

History
- Name: 1993-1994: Via Ionio; 1994-2017: Espresso Ravenna; 2017-2020: Barbara Krahulik; 2020 onwards: Marco Polo
- Namesake: Marco Polo
- Operator: 1993-4: Viamare di Navigazione; 1994-2007: Adriatica di Navigazione; 2007-2020: Tirrenia; 2020 onwards: TT-Line
- Builder: Van der Giessen de Noord
- In service: 1993
- Identification: IMO number: 9019080

General characteristics (as built)
- Tonnage: 14,398 GT
- Length: 150.38 m
- Beam: 23.4 m
- Draught: 6 m
- Installed power: 2x Sulzer 8ZAL40S
- Speed: 19 kn
- Capacity: 50 passengers; 1820 lane meters

General characteristics (after 2020 rebuilt)
- Tonnage: 15,955 GT
- Capacity: 208 pax; 1780 lm
- Notes: otherwise as built

MV Marco Polo is a ropax ferry operating for TT-Line on the Baltic Sea.

== History ==
Built in 1993 by Van der Giessen de Noord for Viamare di Navigazione as Via Ionio, the vessel was sold to Adriatica di Navigazione the following year and operated as the Espresso Ravenna. In 2007 she continued to sail on the Mediterranean with Adriatica's successor Tirrenia. In 2017 she was rechristened Barbara Krahulik.

=== 2020-present ===
In 2020 Barbara Krahulik underwent a refit in Gdańsk, which increased her passenger capacity, and commenced service with TT-Line as MV Marco Polo

== Routes ==
- Travemünde - (Trelleborg) - (Karlshamn) - Klaipeda
- Świnoujście - Trelleborg - Karlshamn - Klaipeda

== Sisters ==
- MV Denia Ciutat Creativa
- MV Lider Prestij
- MF Galileusz
- MV Amal
- MV Drujba
- MF Copernicus
