= MF Copernicus =

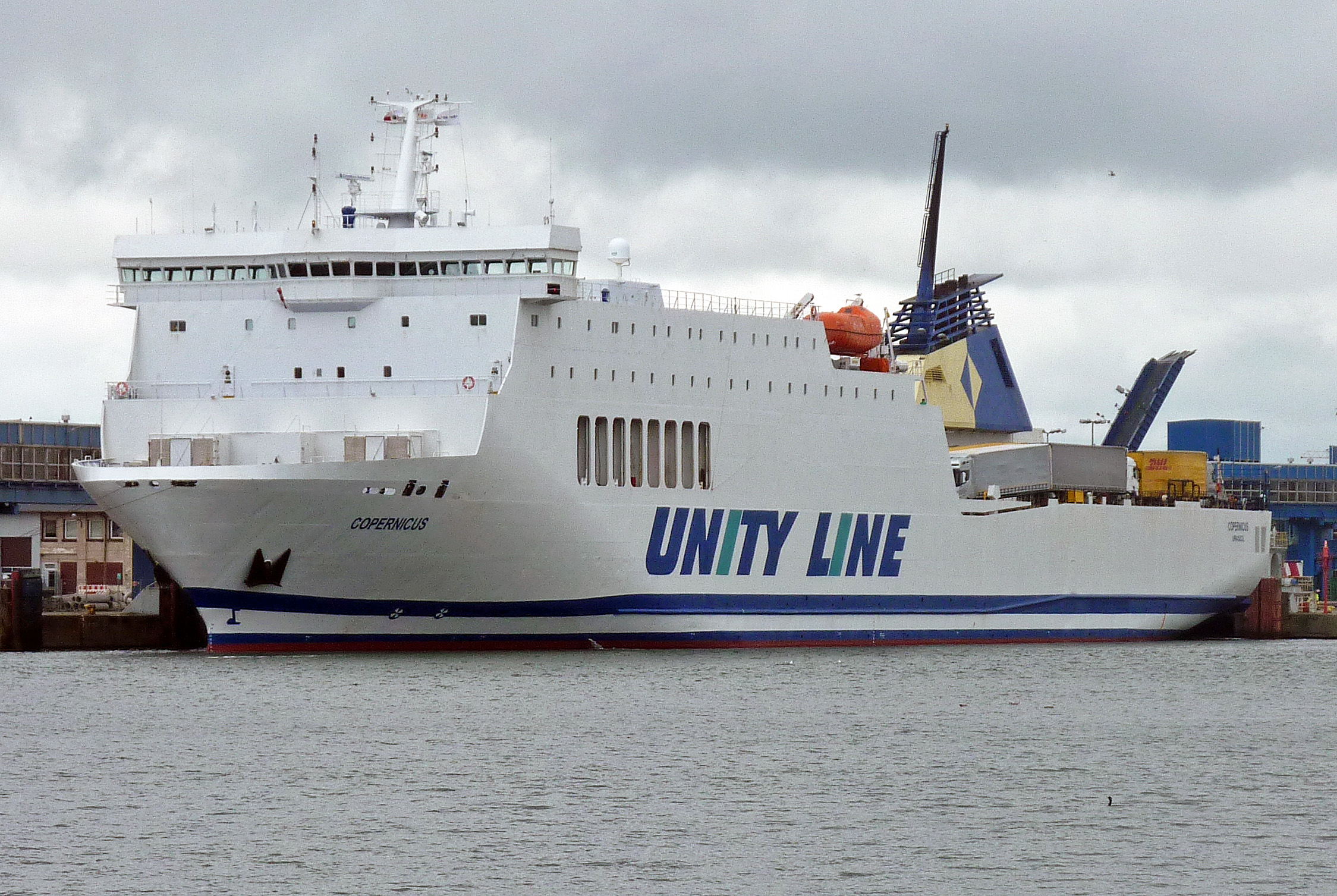
- Copernicus at Świnoujście

History
- Name: 1995–2017: Puglia; 2018 onwards: Copernicus
- Namesake: Nicolaus Copernicus
- Operator: 1995–2017: Tirrenia; 2017: Moby Lines; 2018–2026: Unity Line; 2026 onwards: POLSCA Baltic Ferries
- Port of registry: Limassol, Cyprus
- Route: Gdańsk - Karlshamn
- Builder: Fincantieri
- In service: 1995
- Identification: IMO number: 9031703

General characteristics (as Puglia)
- Class & type: Ferry
- Tonnage: 14,398 GT
- Length: 150.38 m (493 ft 4 in)
- Beam: 23.4 m (76 ft 9 in)
- Draught: 6 m (19 ft 8 in)
- Installed power: 2 × GMT-Sulzer 8ZAL40S
- Speed: 19 knots (35 km/h; 22 mph)
- Capacity: 50 passengers; 1,780 lane meters

General characteristics (as "Copernicus")
- Tonnage: 15,950 GT
- Capacity: 160 pax; 1,742 lm
- Notes: otherwise as built

MF Copernicus is a RORO ferry operating for POLSCA Baltic Ferries between Gdańsk and Karlshamn.

== History ==
Built in 1995 by Fincantieri as the seventh and final Viamare-class vessel, Puglia entered service with Tirrenia. Until 2018 she sailed on the Mediterranean, before being sold to Unity Line, and undergoing a rebuild that would increase her passenger capacity from 50 to 160. Subsequently, she entered service with Unity Line on the Świnoujście – Trelleborg route. As of 2026, she sails with Unity Line's successor POLSCA between Gdańsk and Karlshamn.

== Sisters ==
- MS Denia Ciutat Creativa
- MS Lider Prestij
- MF Galileusz
- MV Marco Polo
- MS Amal
- MS Drujba

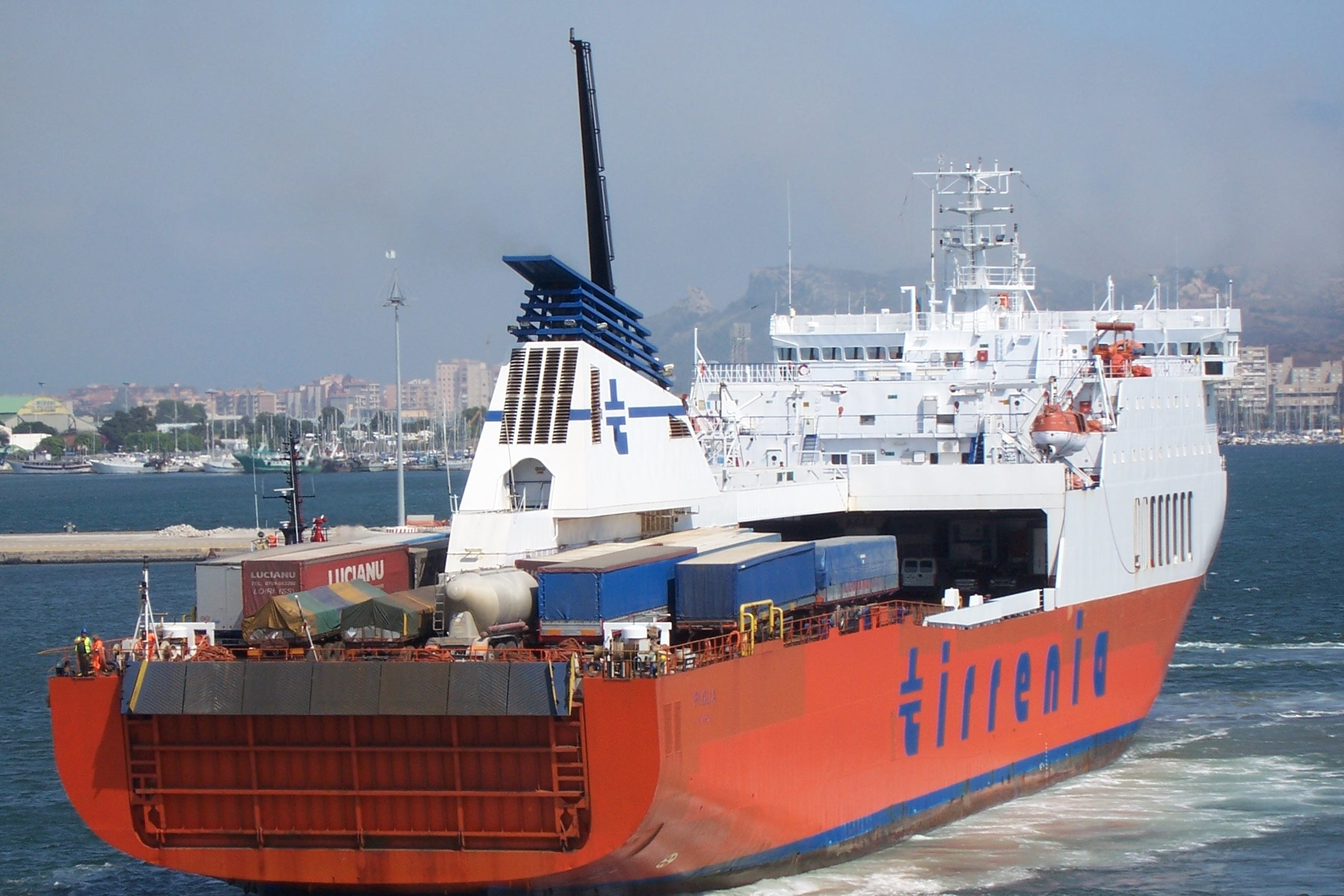
Puglia with Tirrenia
