= Varsovia (ship) =

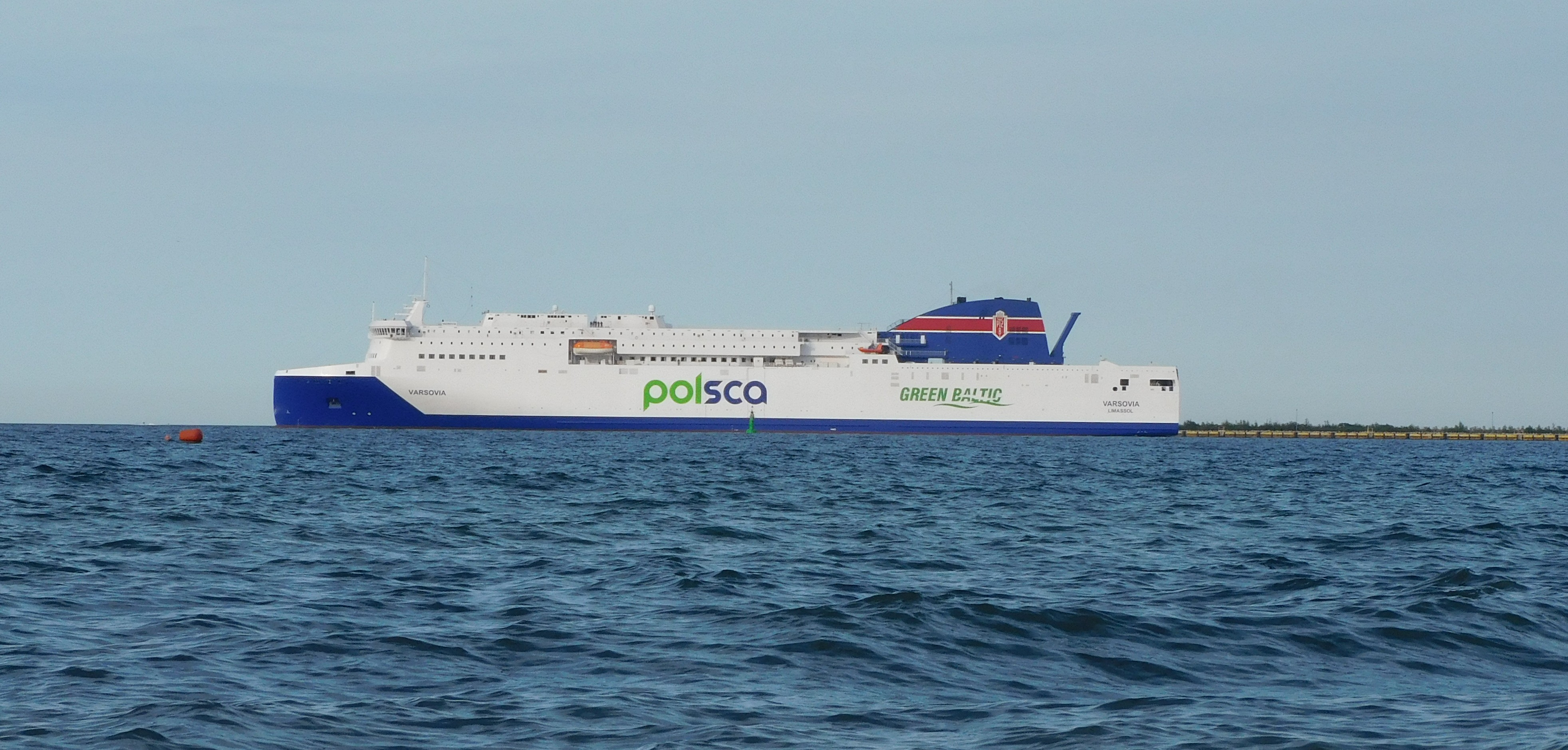
- MF Varsovia in the harbor of Gdańsk

History
- Name: 2024–present: Varsovia
- Owner: 2024–present: Visemar di Navigazione
- Operator: 2024–present: Polferries / POLSCA Baltic Ferries
- Port of registry: 2024–present: Limassol, Cyprus
- Route: Świnoujście – Ystad
- Ordered: 2022
- Builder: Cantiere Navale Visentini; Porto Viro, Italy
- Yard number: 237
- Laid down: 2023
- Launched: 18 April 2023
- Completed: 1 July 2024
- Maiden voyage: 27 July 2024
- In service: 2024
- Identification: IMO number: 9990480; Call sign: 5BK56; MMSI number: 210174000
- Status: in service

General characteristics
- Tonnage: 41,878 GT
- Length: 216.20 m (709 ft 4 in)
- Draught: 6.70 m (22 ft 0 in)
- Ramps: stern ramp on deck 3; tiltable ramp connecting Deck 4 to Deck 5
- Propulsion: 2 x MaK 12M46DF
- Speed: 23.80 knots (44.08 km/h; 27.39 mph)
- Capacity: 936 passengers; 920 berths; 230 cabins; 200 cars; 2875 lane meters
- Crew: 64

Varsovia is a dual-fuel LNG/diesel Ro-Pax ferry built in 2024 by Cantiere Navale Visentini in Porto Viro, Italy. Owned by Visemar di Navigazione and operated under charter by Polish operator Polferries (and the POLSCA Baltic Ferries alliance), the vessel serves the Baltic Sea route connecting Świnoujście, Poland, and Ystad, Sweden.

== Construction and career ==
Varsovia was delivered on 1 July 2024 to Visentini Cantieri Navale Srl, Porto Viro, Italy. Out-chartered to Polferries. At the time she was the largest vessel in their fleet. She sailed under Cyprus flag with home port Limassol July 11, 2024. Varsovia departed from Venice for Ystad on July 22 and arrived at Ystad on July 27. Departed a few hours later for Świnoujście. Varsovia replaced MF Cracovia and MF Baltivia on Świnoujście - Ystad route. On 18 January 2025 MF Varsovia hosted Polish Ferry Fans Meeting organised by Bartosz Bagiński, Fan Club Leader. During the Ferry Shipping Summit event, Varsovia was awarded the Ro-Pax of the year award. In 2026, Varsovia continued sailing the Świnoujście - Ystad route with Polferries' successor POLSCA. She received the POLSCA livery in June 2026.

== Characteristics ==
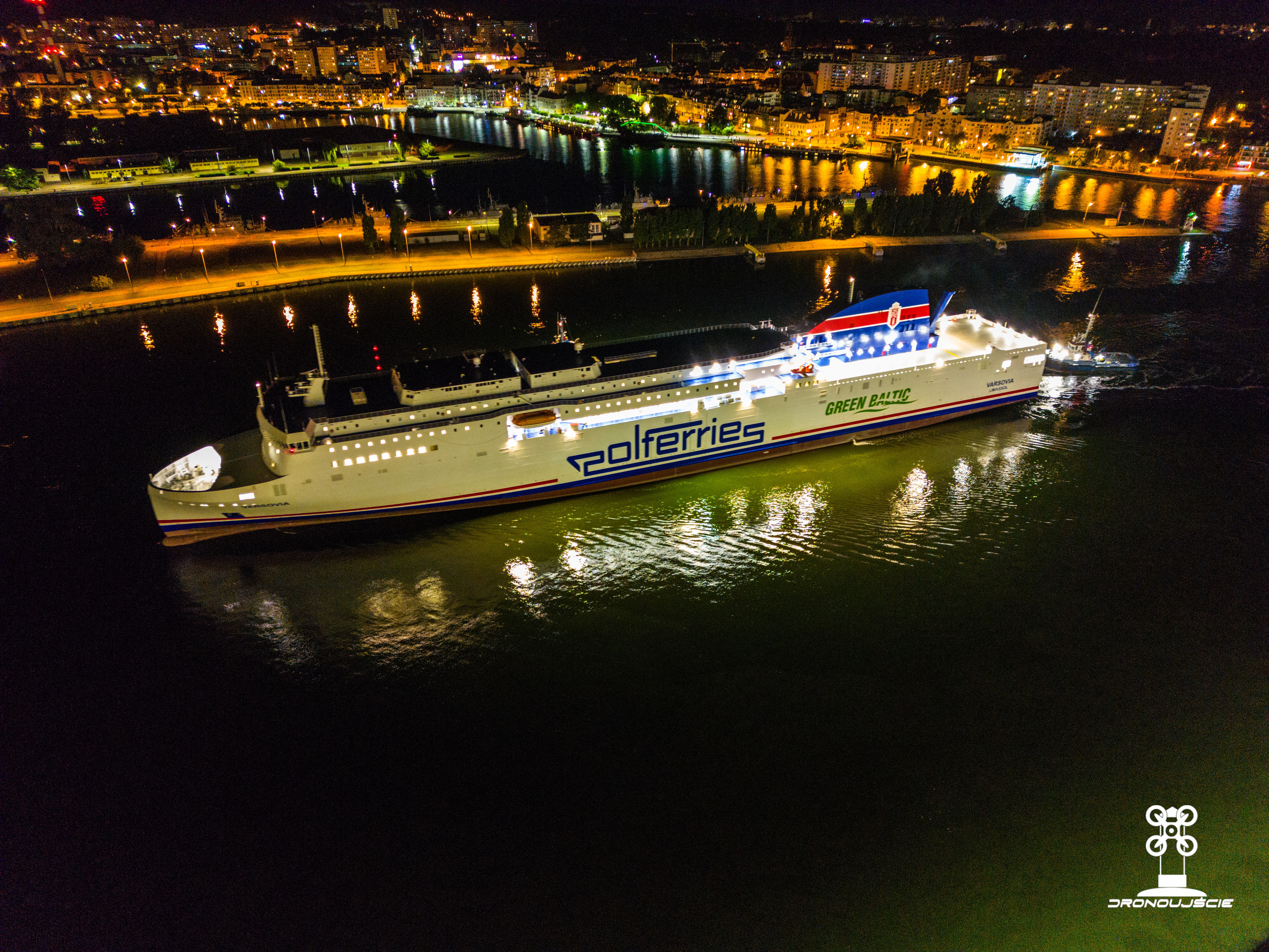
Varsovia at night

Varsovia has a gross tonnage of almost 42000, making her second-largest in the POLSCA fleet after the Jantar Unity-class. At 216 metres she is the longest ship in the fleet. She can accommodate 936 passengers and 2875 lane meters of freight.

== See also ==
- Largest ferries of Europe
