= MS Dalmatia =

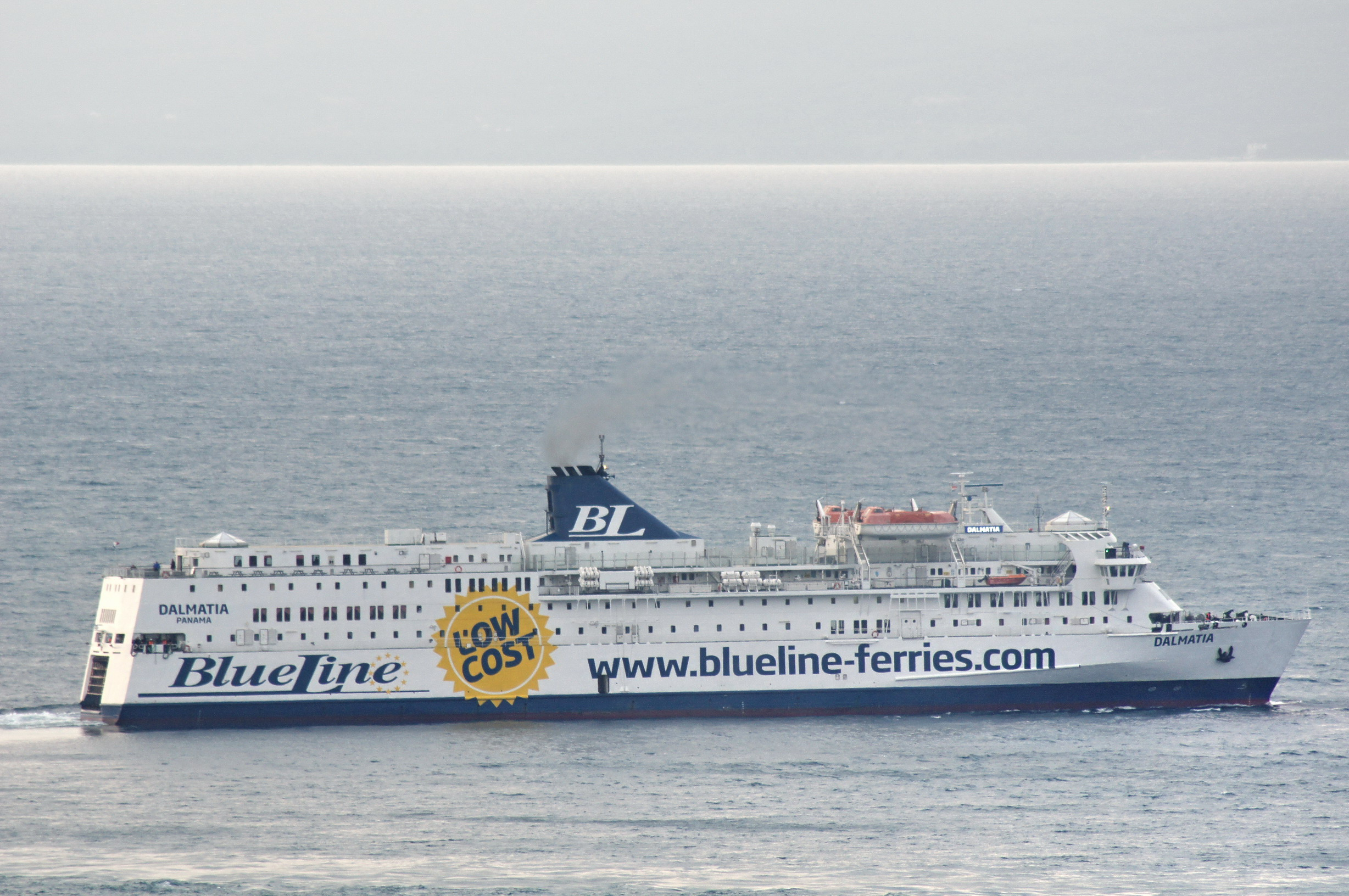
- MS Dalmatia at Split, Croatia, in 2011

History
- Name: Pomerania (1978–2011); Dalmatia (2011–2014)
- Owner: Polish Baltic Shipping Company (1978–2011); Blue Line International (2011–2014)
- Port of registry: Kołobrzeg, Poland (1978–??); Nassau, Bahamas (??–2011); Panama (2011–2014); Cyprus (2014)
- Ordered: 1 May 1972
- Yard number: B490/01
- Laid down: 4 October 1976
- Launched: 31 May 1977
- Completed: June 1978
- In service: 1978–2014
- Identification: IMO number: 7516761
- Fate: Dismantled in Alang, India in 2014

General characteristics
- Type: Cruiseferry
- Tonnage: 12,087 GT; 4,453 NT; 1,856 DWT
- Displacement: 7,957 tons
- Length: 127.44 m (418 ft 1 in)
- Beam: 21.7 m (71 ft 2 in)
- Height: 37.5 m (123 ft 0 in)
- Draft: 5.64 m (18 ft 6 in)
- Depth: 12.36 m (40 ft 7 in)
- Ice class: 1B
- Installed power: 4 × Sulzer 6ZL40/48 (4 × 3,150 kW)
- Propulsion: Two shafts; controllable pitch propellers; Two bow thrusters
- Capacity: 148 cabins; 476 berths; 508 unberthed passengers; 277 cars; 468 m (1,535 ft) of ro-ro cargo
- Crew: 90

MS Dalmatia was a cruiseferry owned by the Croatia-based ferry operator Blue Line International operating the Ancona - Hvar route. She was built in 1978 as MS Pomerania for Polferries.

In 1994, she had a minor collision (referred to as a "scrape") with another cruiseferry, MS Silja Europa.

She was inserted on the Swinoujscie - Kopenhagen - Felixstowe route. The route was changed in 1979 to Helsinki - Nynäshamn - Gdynia. In 1980 the ship was rented to Kalmar Line for its Kalmar - Rönne route. Kalmar Line was bankrupt in July 1980 and the ship was inserted to Polferries Karlskrona - Gdynia route. The ship was rented again in 1982 to Cotunav between Genua/ Marseille - Tunis. The ship was returned to Polferries two months later. The ship was inserted on the Swinoujscie - Malmö route in 1995. The route was changed again in 1997 to Malmö - Swinoujscie. In 2011 the ship was sold to Blue Line for their Split - Ancona route. The ship was dismantled in Alang, India in 2014.
