= MS Skåne =

Swedish passenger ferry

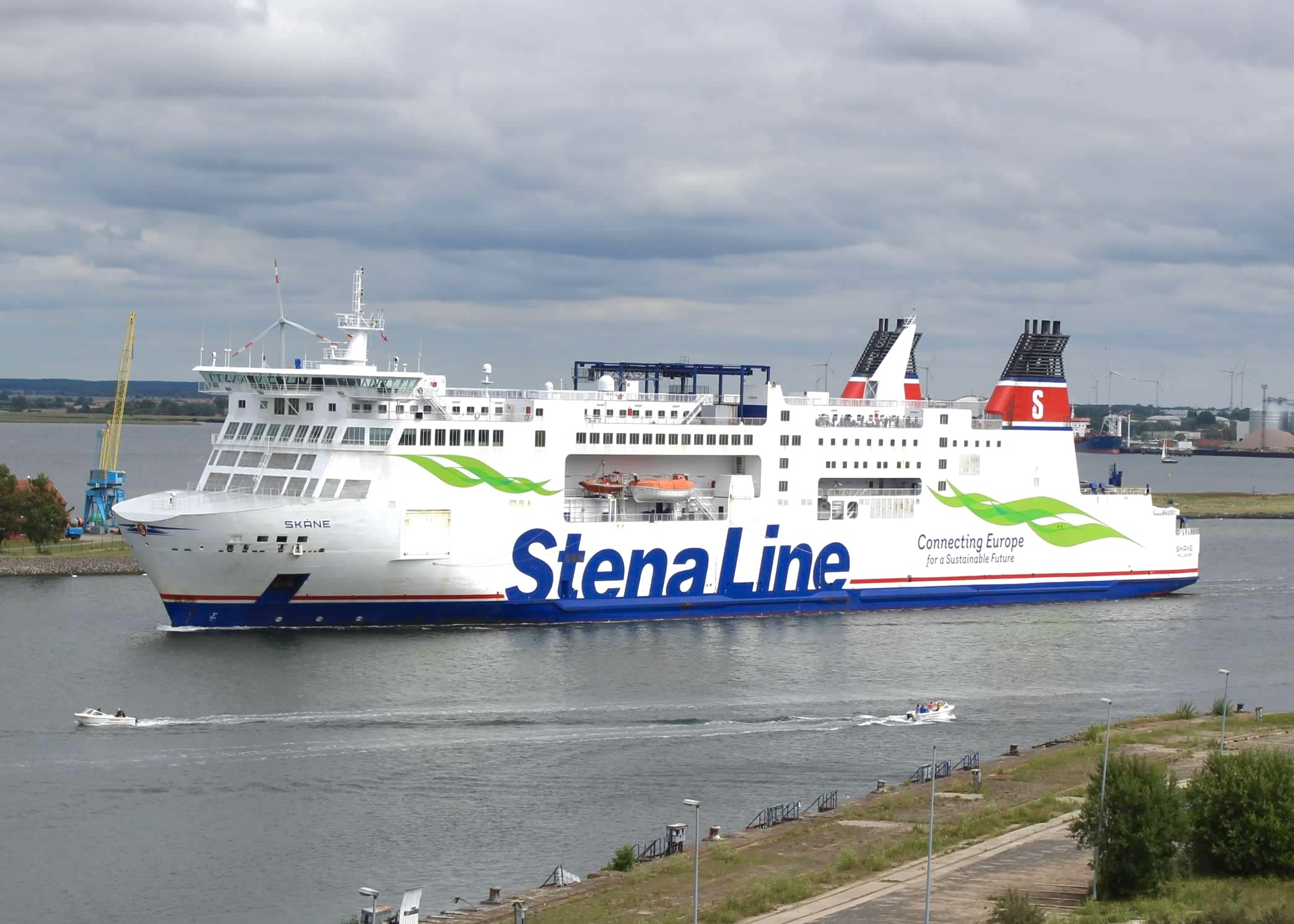
- MS Skåne departing from Rostock, July 2018

History

Sweden
- Name: Skåne
- Namesake: Skåne
- Owner: Stena Line, Gothenburg, Sweden
- Operator: Scandlines, Rostock, Germany
- Port of registry: Trelleborg
- Route: Trelleborg—Rostock
- Builder: Astilleros Españoles, Puerto Real, Spain
- Launched: 9 August 1997
- Acquired: 22 June 1998
- Identification: IMO number: 9133915; Call sign: SIEB; MMSI number: 265463000
- Status: in active service, as of 27 August 2012

General characteristics
- Tonnage: 42,800 GT; 7,920 DWT
- Length: 200.2 m (656 ft 10 in)
- Beam: 29 m (95 ft 2 in)
- Draught: 6.2 m (20 ft 4 in)
- Propulsion: 4 × MAN B&W 8L48/60 diesel engines, 28,960 kW (38,840 hp) 2 shafts
- Speed: 21 knots (39 km/h; 24 mph)
- Capacity: 600 passengers; 3,295 lane meters; 1,110 rail lane meters

MS Skane (Swedish: Skåne) is a Swedish passenger ferry in operation between Trelleborg in Scania, Sweden and Rostock in Mecklenburg, Germany. The world's largest multi-purpose ro-ro/train ferry, it is owned by the Stena Line, and operated by Scandlines. The ship was built in 1997-98 by Astilleros Españoles of Spain. It is named for the southern Swedish province of Skåne, called "Scania" in English.

== Ship details ==
Skane was built at the Astilleros Españoles shipyard in Puerto Real, Spain, and launched on 9 August 1997. The 42,800 gross ton ship is 200.2 m (656 ft 10 in) long, 29 m (95 ft 2 in) abeam, and has a draught of 6.2 m (20 ft 4 in). She is powered by four MAN B&W 8L48/60 diesel engines, providing a total of 28,960 kW (38,840 hp), giving a service speed of 21 knots (39 km/h; 24 mph). The ship has 3,295 lane meters for road vehicles and another 1,110 lane meters for rolling stock, which give it a capacity of up to 2,630 tonnes of road vehicles and 3,330 tonnes of railway stock. It has accommodation for up to 600 passengers in 150 cabins. Delivered on 22 June 1998, she currently sails between Sweden and Germany. MS Skåne is designed by Naval Architect Knud E. Hansen A/S in Denmark.
