= Polferries =

Polish ferry operator

- Founded: 31 January 1976
- Founder: Minister of Foreign Trade and Maritime Economy
- Headquarters: Kołobrzeg, Poland
- Area served: Poland, Sweden, Denmark
- Services: Passenger transportation, Freight transportation
- Website: www.polferries.pl

Polferries is the largest Polish ferry operator. The Polish Baltic Shipping Company (Polska Żegluga Bałtycka - PŻB) was established on 31 January 1976 as a state-owned shipping company. Under the operating name Polferries, the company runs ferry routes across the Baltic Sea between Poland and Scandinavia.

In 1996 Polferries approved quality assurance system the International Safety Management Code (ISM). In May 1997 the company was recognised as meeting the requirements of the Quality Management Certificate ISO 9002. It became legally recognised as a corporate body in 1992.

Until 2001, Polferries had owned two ferry terminals in Poland, the Ferry Terminal in Gdańsk and the Ferry Terminal in Świnoujście. Today, the company runs the Ferry Terminal in Gdańsk.

== Fleet ==
Ship	Image	Built	In service from	Gross Tonage	Passengers	Load Line	Knots	Route	Flag and home port
Varsovia		2024	27 July 2024	41.878 GT	976	Ro-Ro line 2875 m Personal cars line 967 m	23.80	Świnoujście- Ystad	Limassol, Cyprus
Nova Star		2011	14 September 2018	27.744 GT	827	Ro-Ro line 1575 m Personal cars line 1215 m	21.00	Gdańsk- Nynäshamn	Nassau, Bahamas
Cracovia		2002	12 September 2017	25.028 GT	653	2196 m	22.00	Chartered to Nouris El Bahar Ferries (With polish bridge and engine room crew)	Nassau, Bahamas
Mazovia		1996	15 June 2015	29.940 GT	1000	2620 m	21.00	Świnoujście- Ystad	Nassau, Bahamas
Wawel		1980	15 February 2005	25.318 GT	1000	1490 m	18.00	2005-2015 Świnoujście- Ystad 2015-present Gdańsk-Nynäshamn	Nassau, Bahamas

== Future Fleet and Future Arrangements ==
1 ferry ordered in Gdańsk Remontowa Shipyard

== Former fleet ==
- MV Baltivia (built in Sweden, 1981) - 2007-2024 - sold to Georgian operator.
- Boomerang (built in Australia, 1997) — 1997–2001 — now Tallink AutoExpress 2 with Conferry.
- MF Drottningen (built in Sweden in 1968) — 1975–1976 — scrapped in China in 2005.
- MF Gute (built in Sweden, 1979) — 2000 — laid up.
- MF Kahleberg (built in Germany, 1983) — 2003–2004 — now RG 1 with RG Line – scrapped.
- MF Lancut (built in Germany, 1967) — 1985–1994 — scrapped in India in 2003.
- MF Nieborow (built in Germany, 1973) — 1988–2002 — now Sveti Stefan II with Montenegro Lines – scrapped.
- MF Parsęta (built in Germany, 1970) — 1991–1997 — scrapped.
- MF Silesia (built in Poland, 1979) — 1979–2005 — now Galaxy with European Seaways.
- MF Wawel (built in Germany, 1965) — 1973–1988 — scrapped in Turkey in 2004.
- MS Pomerania (built in Poland, 1978) — 1978–2010 — later Dalmatia with Blue Line International — scrapped in India in 2014.
- MS Rogalin (built in France, 1972) — 1978–1987, 1989–1991, 1992–2003 — scrapped in India in 2004.

== Gallery ==
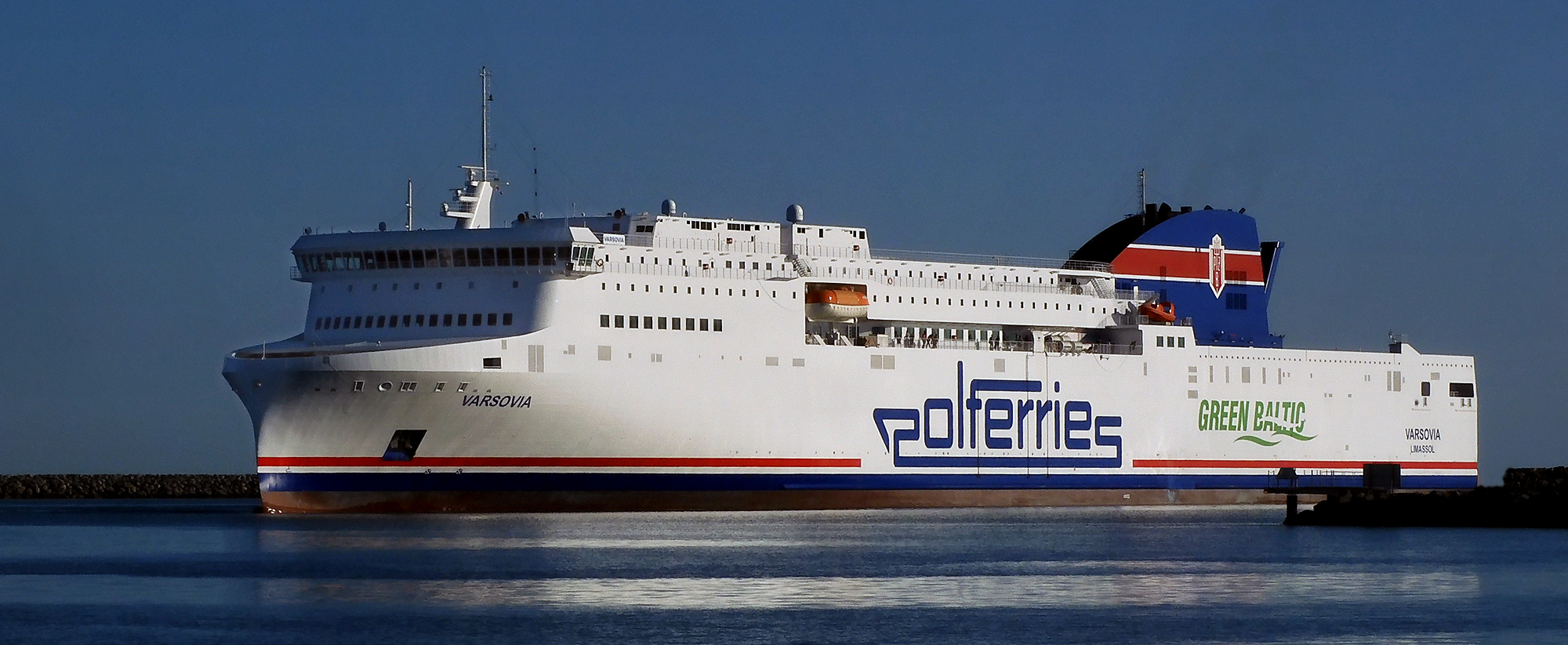
MF Varsovia 2024

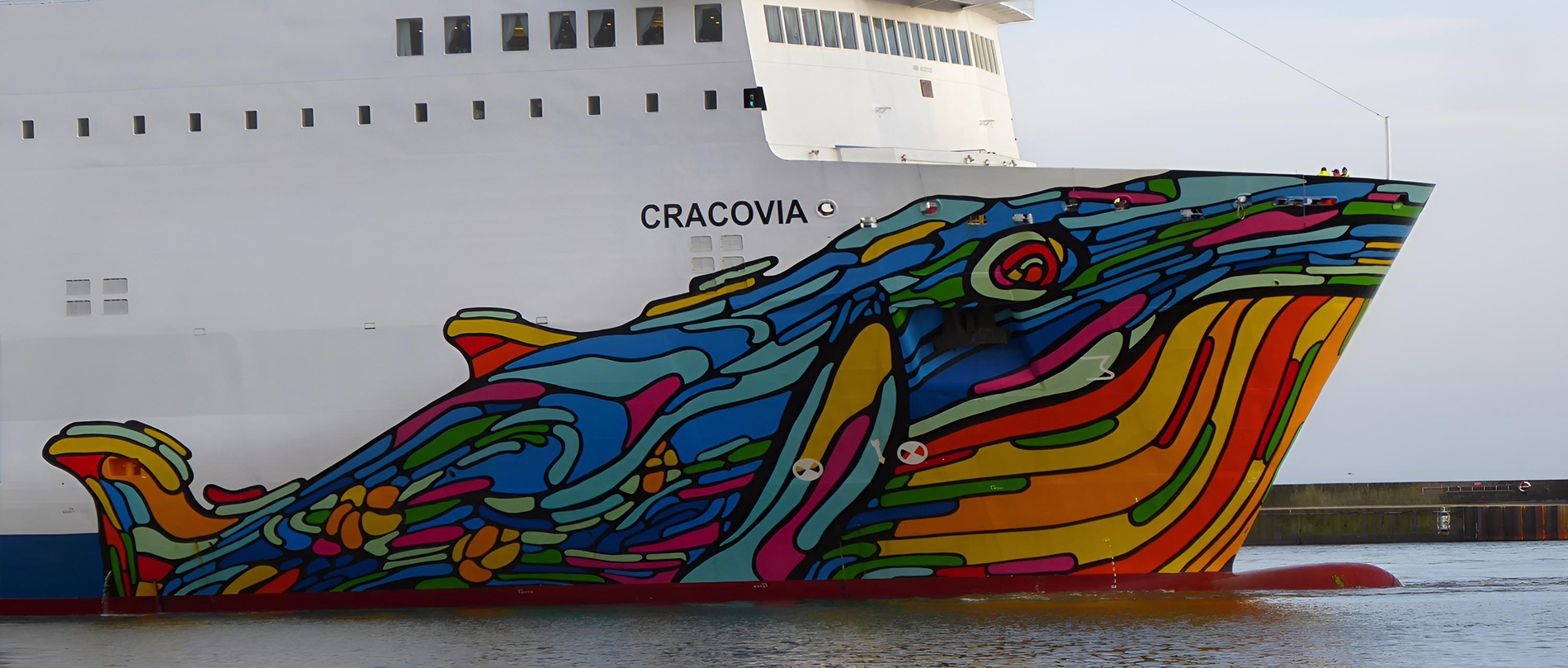
MS Cracovia

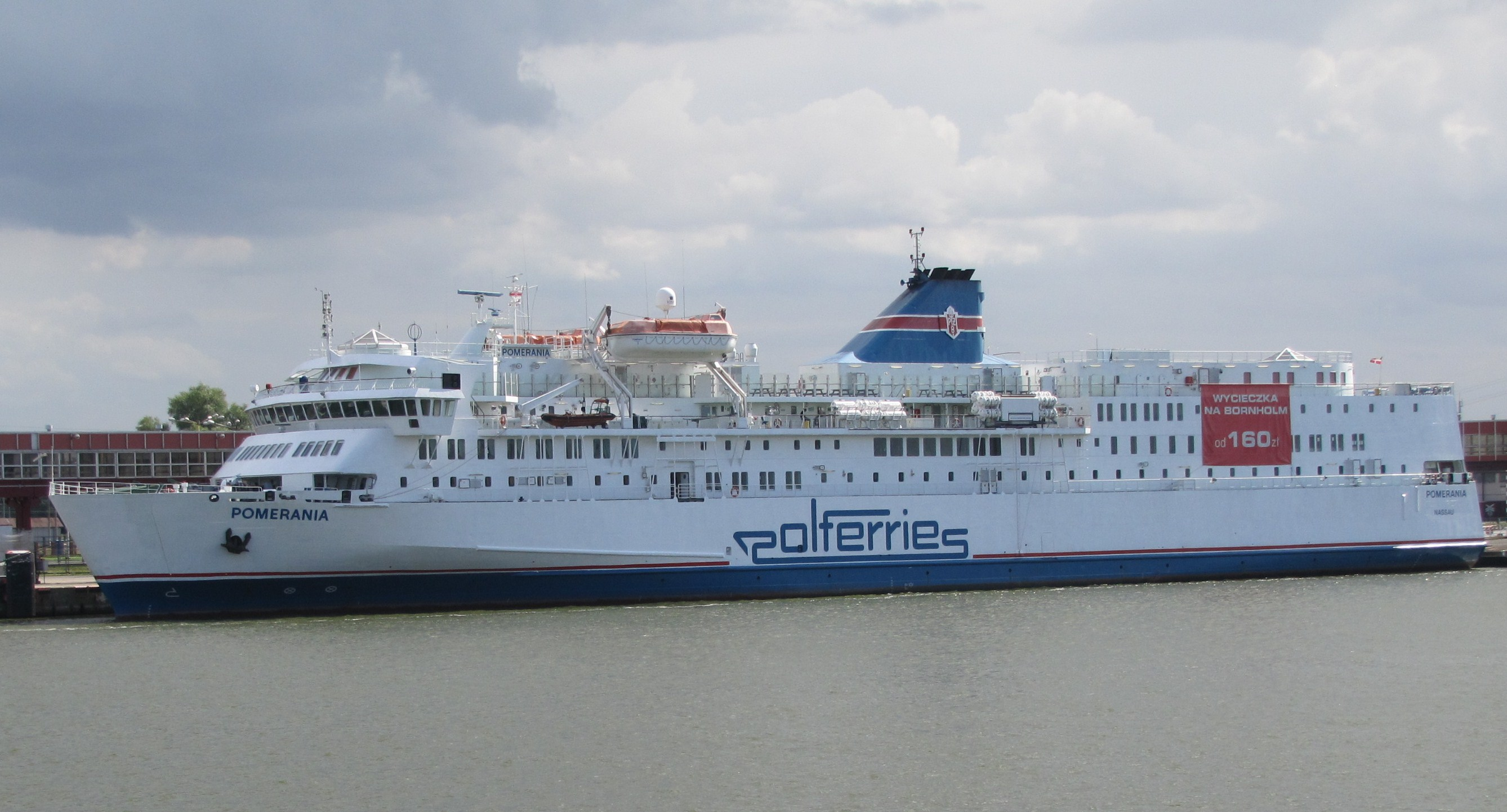
MF Pomerania

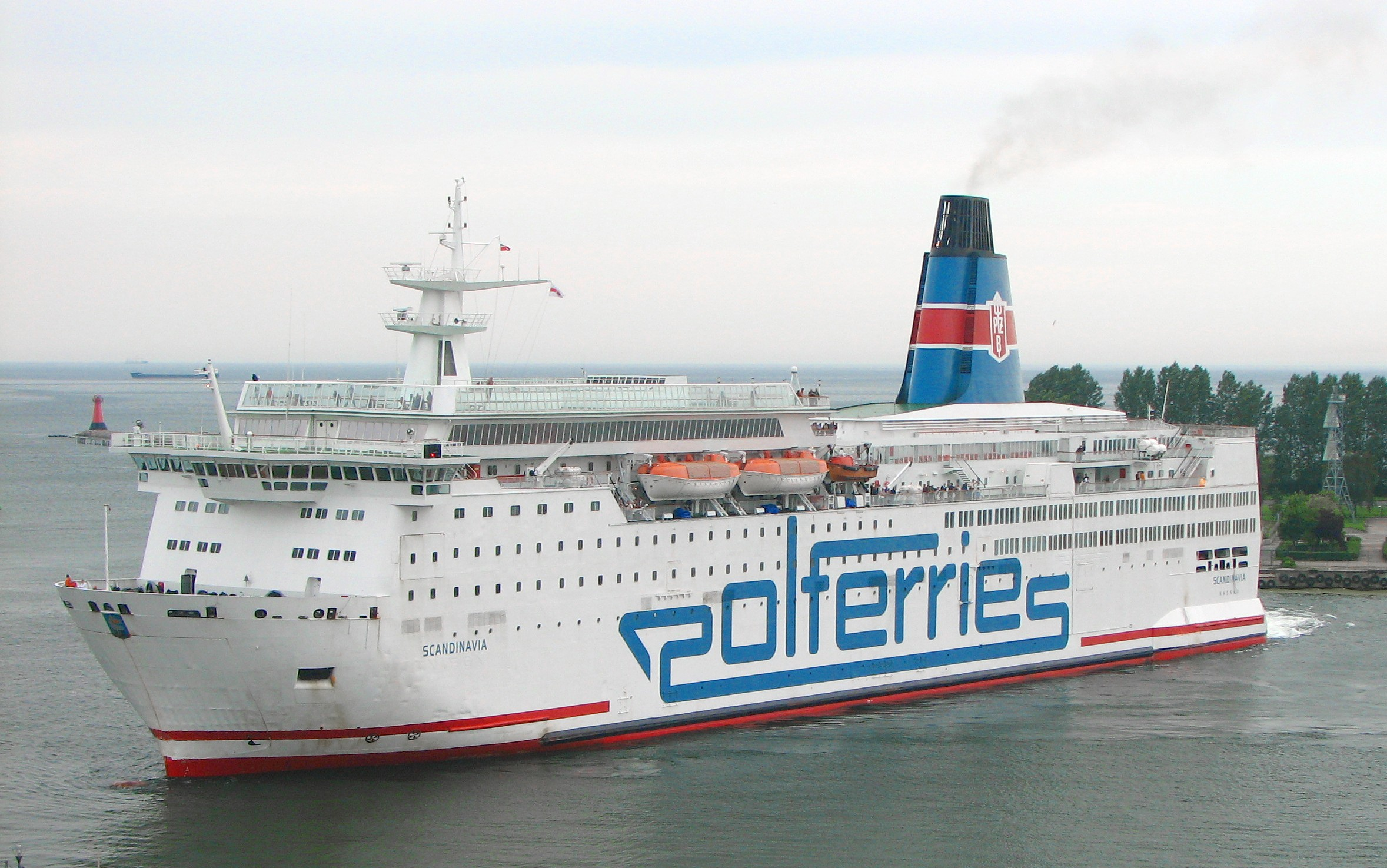
Scandinavia in Gdańsk

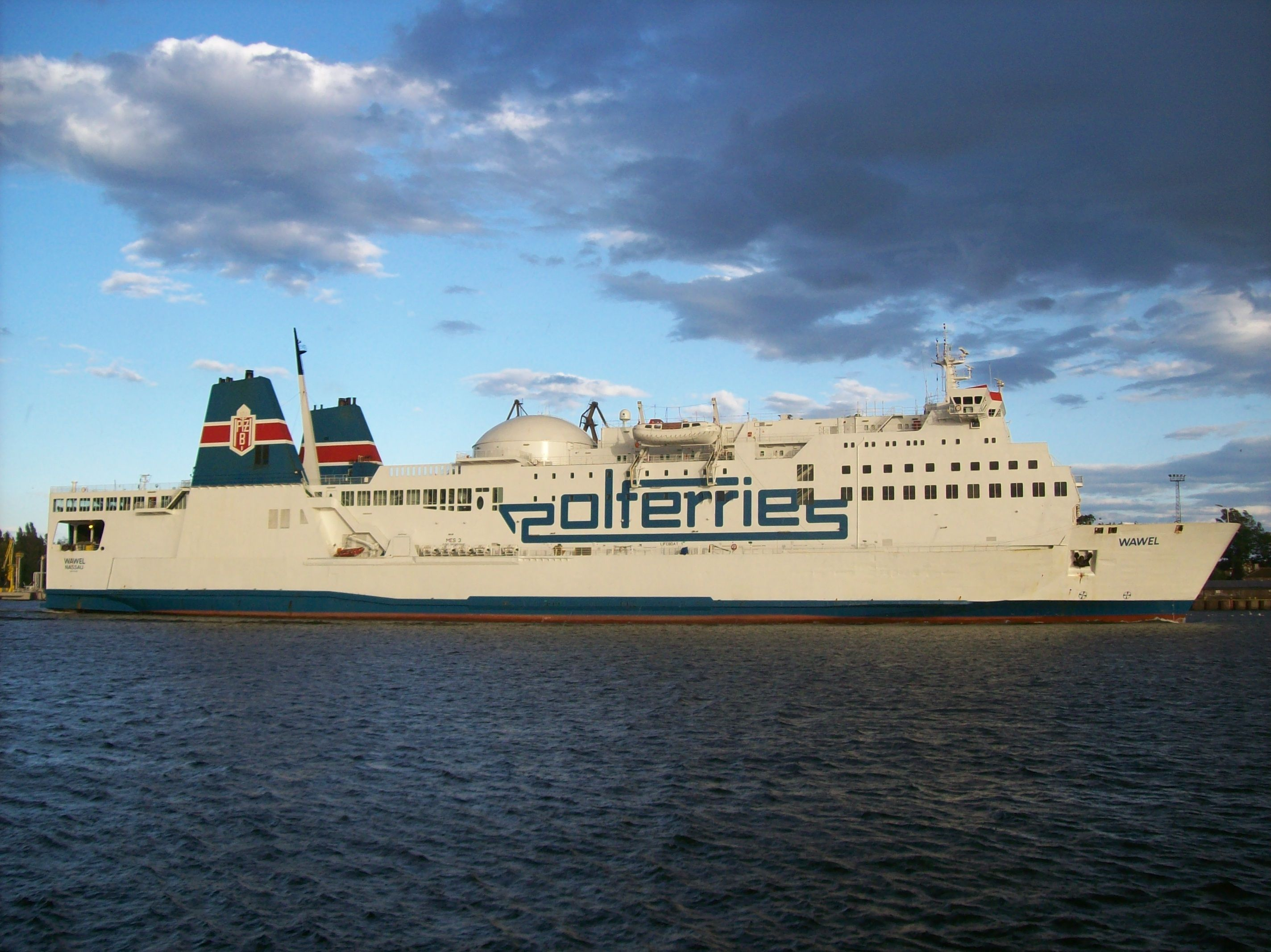
MF Wawel in Świnoujście

House flag
