= Unity Line =

Polish transportation company

- Founded: 1994
- Headquarters: Szczecin, Poland
- Area served: Baltic Sea
- Services: Passenger transportation Freight transportation
- Parent: Polsteam
- Website: unityline.pl

Unity Line is a Polish company that operates RoRo and train ferry services between Świnoujście in Poland and the Swedish ports of Ystad and Trelleborg.

== Routes ==
Unity Line operates two routes across the Baltic Sea.

- Świnoujście – Ystad
- Świnoujście – Trelleborg

== Fleet ==
Unity Line currently (May 2023) operates a fleet of seven ships.

| Name | Image | Built | Entered service | Tonnage | Flag | Notes |
|---|---|---|---|---|---|---|
| Polonia | | 1995 | 1995 | 29,875 GRT | Cyprus | Train ferry |
| Skania | | 1995 | 2008 | 23,663 GRT | Cyprus | |
| Galileusz | | 1993 | 2006 | 12,982 GRT | Cyprus | |
| Gryf | | 1991 | 2004 | 18,653 GRT | Cyprus | |
| Copernicus | | 1995 | 2018 | 14,398 GRT | Cyprus | |

On 26 November 2021 in Gdansk Remontowa Shiprepair Yard and Polskie Promy signed a contract to build three new ferries with an option about a fourth one. Two of them will be built for Unity Line.

The company has acquired the Visentini-built Epsilon for delivery in November 2023.
