= Lane meter =

Unit of deck area in cargo vessel

A lane meter (or lanes in meters) is a unit of deck area in roll-on/roll-off ships, cargo vessels where containers or other cargo, including ferried vehicles, can be rolled or driven on and off. A lane meter is defined as a strip of deck one meter long. A lane is conventionally 2 meters wide, so that a lane meter is equivalent to 2 square metres (21.528 sq ft).

The rule of thumb is that a car on a car ferry will need 6 lane meters, and a European semitrailer 18 lane meters.
