= Cruise Europa =

Cruise ferry built in Italy

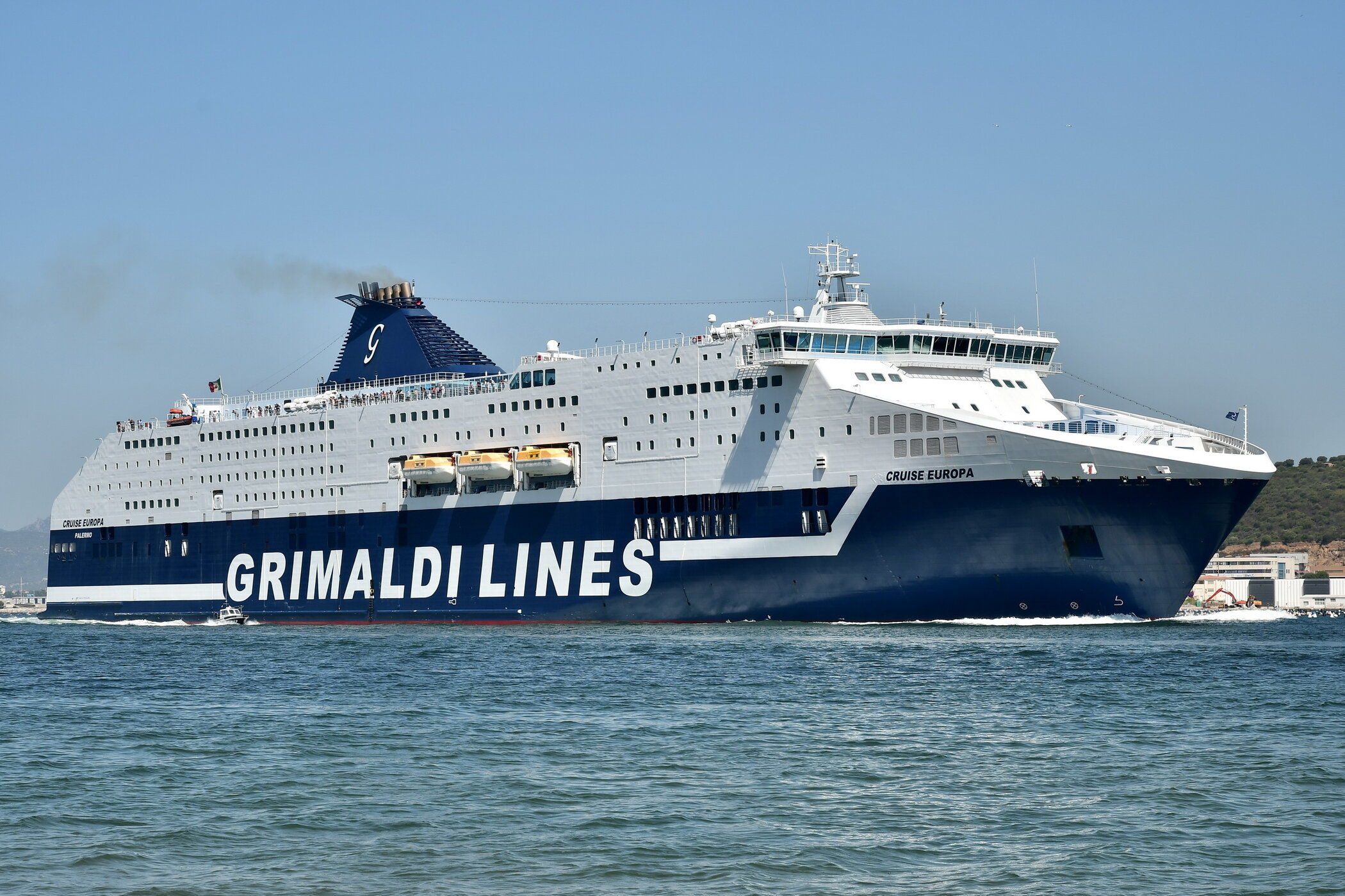
- Cruise Europa in Olbia

History
- Name: Cruise Europa
- Owner: Grimaldi Group
- Operator: Grimaldi Group
- Port of registry: Palermo, Italy
- Builder: Fincantieri, Castellammare di Stabia, Italy
- Launched: 14 March 2009
- Completed: 30 September 2009
- In service: 2009–present
- Identification: Call sign: IBEV; IMO number: 9351490; MMSI number: 247273800
- Status: In service

General characteristics
- Type: Cruiseferry
- Tonnage: 54,310 GT
- Length: 225 m (738 ft 2 in)
- Beam: 30.4 m (99 ft 9 in)
- Draught: 7 m (23 ft 0 in)
- Installed power: 4 × Wärtsilä 12V46D; 55,440 kW (combined)
- Speed: 28 knots (52 km/h; 32 mph)
- Capacity: 3,000 passengers; 250 vehicles

Cruise Europa is a cruiseferry owned by Grimaldi Group. It was built at Fincantieri in Castellammare di Stabia, Italy.

She was the third of a series of four sister ships, the others being Cruise Roma, Cruise Barcelona (both operated by Grimaldi Lines) and Cruise Sardegna. They are the largest ferries under Italian flag. Cruise Europa is distinguished from Cruise Roma and Cruise Barcelona by a different arrangement of the accommodation and interiors, enabling her to carry a larger number of passengers.

The ship has 413 cabins, including 60 suites, one à la carte restaurant, one self-service restaurant, a conference room, a fast food, a dog kennel, a boutique, a swimming pool, a disco, a casino, a shopping center and an internet café.

From December 2012, Cruise Europa is operated by Minoan Lines on the route linking Trieste, Italy to Patras, Greece via Ancona and Igoumenitsa.

On 28 December 2014 Cruise Europa participated in the rescue operation following the MS Norman Atlantic disaster. Being one of the first ships to reach the burning ferry, as well as the largest one, Cruise Europa was appointed On-Scene Commander and took onboard 69 survivors from Norman Atlantic, flown to the ship by rescue helicopters.
