= Cruise Sardegna =

Cruise ferry built in Italy

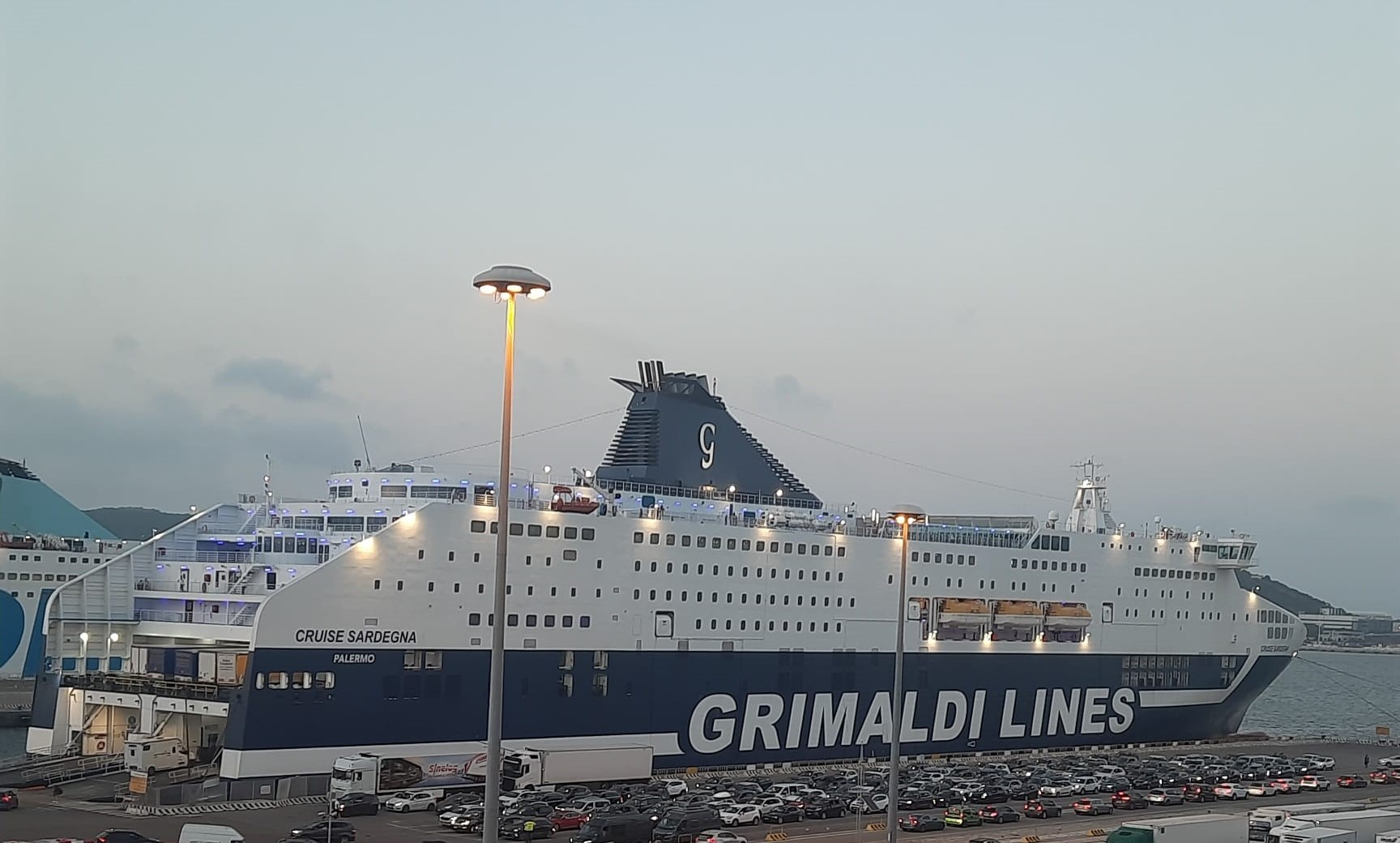
- Cruise Sardegna docked in Olbia

History
- Name: Cruise Olympia (2010–2021); Cruise Sardegna (2021–present)
- Namesake: Ancient Olympia (2010–2021); Sardegna (2021–present)
- Owner: Grimaldi Group
- Operator: Minoan Lines (2010–2021); Grimaldi Group (2021–present)
- Port of registry: Palermo, Italy
- Builder: Fincantieri, Castellammare di Stabia, Italy
- Launched: 14 November 2009
- Completed: 30 June 2010
- Maiden voyage: 2010
- In service: 2010–present
- Identification: Call sign: IBEY; IMO number: 9351505; MMSI number: 247286700
- Status: In service

General characteristics
- Type: Cruiseferry
- Tonnage: 54,310 GT
- Length: 225 m (738 ft 2 in)
- Beam: 30.4 m (99 ft 9 in)
- Draught: 7 m (23 ft 0 in)
- Installed power: 4 × Wärtsilä 12V46D; 55,440 kW (combined)
- Speed: 28 knots (52 km/h; 32 mph)
- Capacity: 3,000 passengers; 963 vehicles

Cruise Sardegna is a cruiseferry owned and operated by Grimaldi Group. Previously was operated by Minoan Lines under the name Cruise Olympia. It was built at Fincantieri in Castellammare di Stabia, Italy.

She was the fourth and last of a series of four sister ships, the others being Cruise Roma, Cruise Barcelona (both operated by Grimaldi Lines) and Cruise Europa (operated by Minoan Lines). They are the largest ferries under Italian flag. Cruise Olympia and Cruise Europa are distinguished from Cruise Roma and Cruise Barcelona by a slightly different arrangement of the accommodation and interiors, enabling them to carry a larger number of passengers.

The ship has 413 cabins, including 68 suites, one à la carte restaurant, one self-service restaurant, a conference room, a fast food, a dog kennel, a boutique, a swimming pool, a disco, a casino, a shopping center and an internet café.

Cruise Olympia previously operated by Minoan Lines on the route linking Ancona, Italy to Patras, Greece via Igoumenitsa; she made the passage in 22 hours. In February 2021 Grimaldi Group announced that Cruise Olympia and Cruise Europa would be transferred to the Grimaldi Group. Cruise Olympia left Greece on 4 February and arrived at Malta's Palumbo shipyards the next day and was renamed.
