= Cruise Roma =

Cruise ferry built in Italy

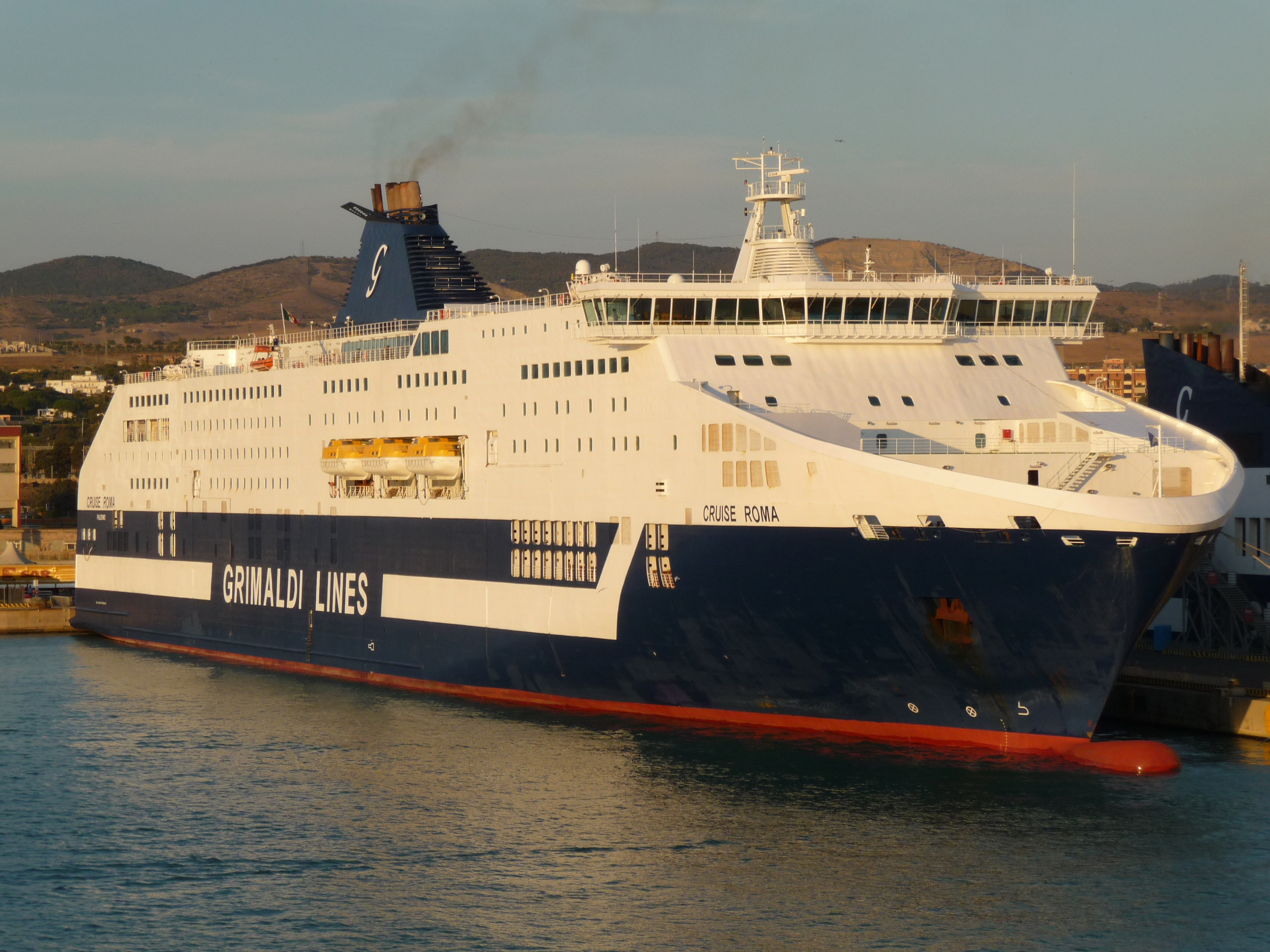
- Cruise Roma

History
- Name: Cruise Roma
- Owner: Grimaldi Group
- Operator: Grimaldi Lines
- Port of registry: Palermo, Italy
- Builder: Fincantieri, Castellammare di Stabia, Italy
- Launched: 22 June 2007
- In service: 2007–present
- Identification: Call sign: IBWO; IMO number: 9351476; MMSI number: 247219400
- Status: In service

General characteristics
- Type: Cruiseferry
- Tonnage: 63,000 GT
- Length: 254 m (833 ft 4 in)
- Beam: 30.4 m (99 ft 9 in)
- Draught: 7 m (23 ft 0 in)
- Installed power: 4 × Wärtsilä 12V46D; 55,440 kW (combined)
- Speed: 28 knots (52 km/h; 32 mph)
- Capacity: 3,500 passengers; 215 vehicles

Cruise Roma, owned and operated by Grimaldi Lines, is the longest cruiseferry in the world. It was built at Fincantieri in Castellammare di Stabia, Italy.

She was the first of a series of four sister ships, the others being Cruise Barcelona (also operated by Grimaldi Lines), Cruise Europa and Cruise Olympia (operated by Minoan Lines). They are the largest ferries under the Italian flag.

Before the lengthening, the ship had 470 cabins, including 60 suites, one à la carte restaurant, a self-service restaurant, a cafeteria, an ice-cream parlour, a swimming pool, a disco, a casino, a conference room, a boutique, a shopping centre.

Cruise Roma is operated on the route linking Civitavecchia, Italy to Barcelona, Spain via Porto Torres (Sardinia), together with her sister Cruise Barcelona.

The ferry was lengthened at Fincantieri shipyard in Palermo in February 2019. Its twin, the ferry Cruise Barcelona was also lengthened in 2019. The same year, the vessel was retrofitted with a 5,5 MWh Orca ESS battery system from Corvus Energy. This led to an estimated savings of about 1 million litres of diesel each year, resulting in reduced emissions of CO_{2}.
