= G4-class freighter =

Combination roll-on/roll-off cargo ships of the Atlantic Container Line

The G4 class is a series of five combination roll-on/roll-off cargo ships (ConRO) that are operated by the Atlantic Container Line (ACL) and entered service in the mid-2010s. They are named Atlantic Star, Atlantic Sail, Atlantic Sea, Atlantic Sky, and Atlantic Sun.

== History ==
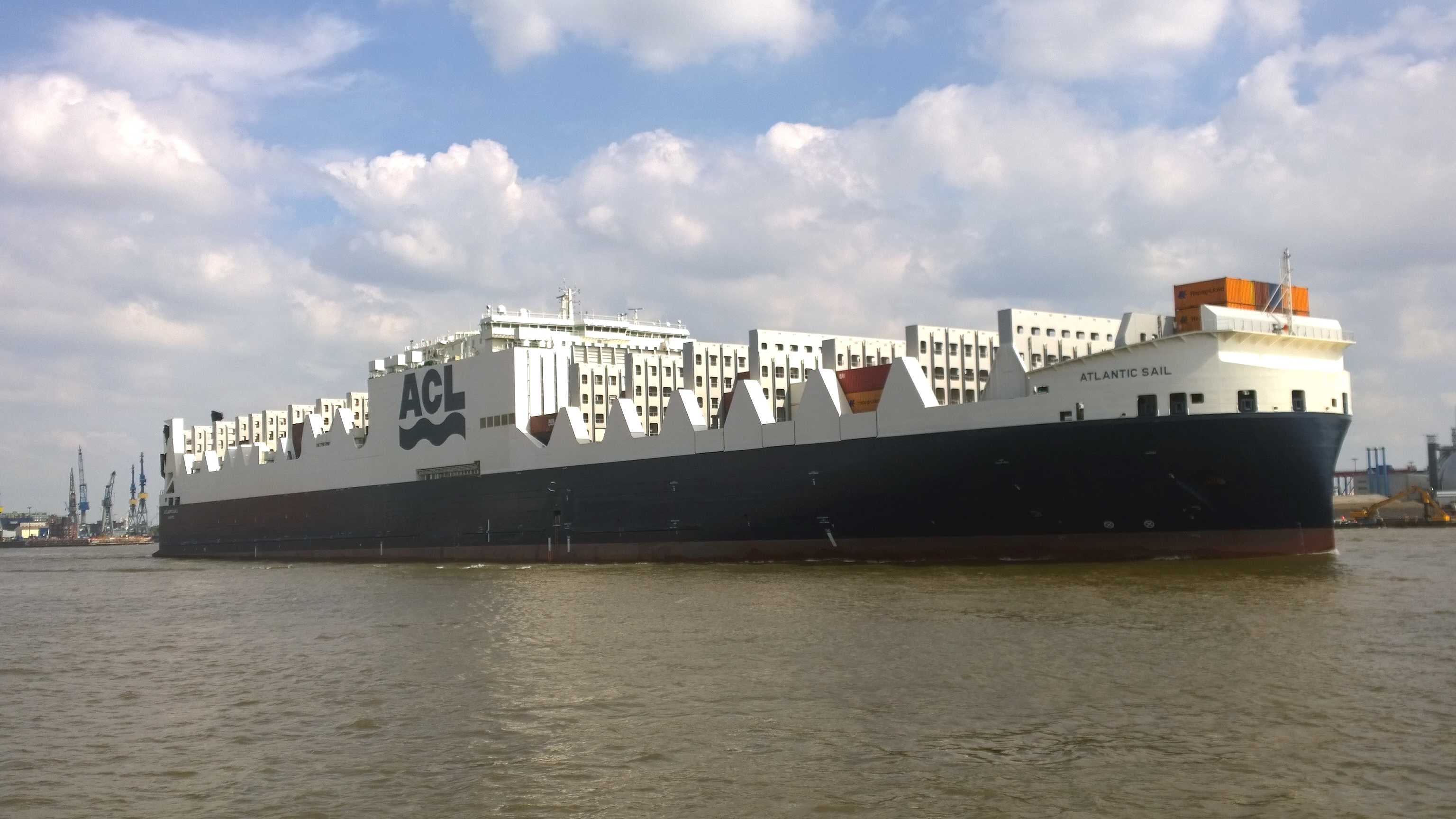
Atlantic Sail

Early design work for a new ConRO design began at International Maritime Advisors, which finished the basic plans in 2008. Knud E. Hansen modified the design to ACL specifications, and in July 2012 the construction contract for five ships was awarded to Hudong-Zhonghua Shipbuilding. Construction began with steel-cutting for the first ship, at the time unnamed, in September 2013. In October 2014, ACL announced the names of the ships in the fleet, having selected them from employee suggestions.

The first ship of the class, Atlantic Star, was launched in November 2014 and was planned to enter service in mid-2015, but ACL did not take delivery of the vessel until October 2015, and her maiden voyage did not occur until early 2016. The remaining four ships were delivered over the course of 2016, beginning with Atlantic Sail in April.

The entire fleet had originally been planned to enter service in 2015, but construction at the shipyard was delayed due to challenges building to the brand new design. Immediately following their entry into service, problems with the quality of major components license-built in Asia to European designs were identified, requiring drydocking of the vessels for replacement of the faulty parts.

== Design ==
The G4 class is the largest ConRO design in the world, slightly larger than the preceding 1980s-built G3 class but with significantly more cargo capacity. They are 296 metres (971 ft) long, with a beam of 37.6 metres (123 ft) and a draft of 11.6 metres (38 ft), and have a gross tonnage of 100,430 GT, with a deadweight tonnage of 49,600 DWT. Each ship is driven by a Wärtsilä RT-flex68D eight-cylinder low speed diesel engine with a power output of 22,000 kilowatts (30,000 hp) that gives a service speed of up to 19.25 knots (22.15 mph). There are three Wärtsilä thrusters installed for maneuvering, two at the bow and one at the stern. Shipboard power is supplied by a 2,000 kilowatts (2,700 hp) generator driven by the main engine, as well as four Yanmar gensets that have a total of 8,750 kilowatts (11,730 hp).

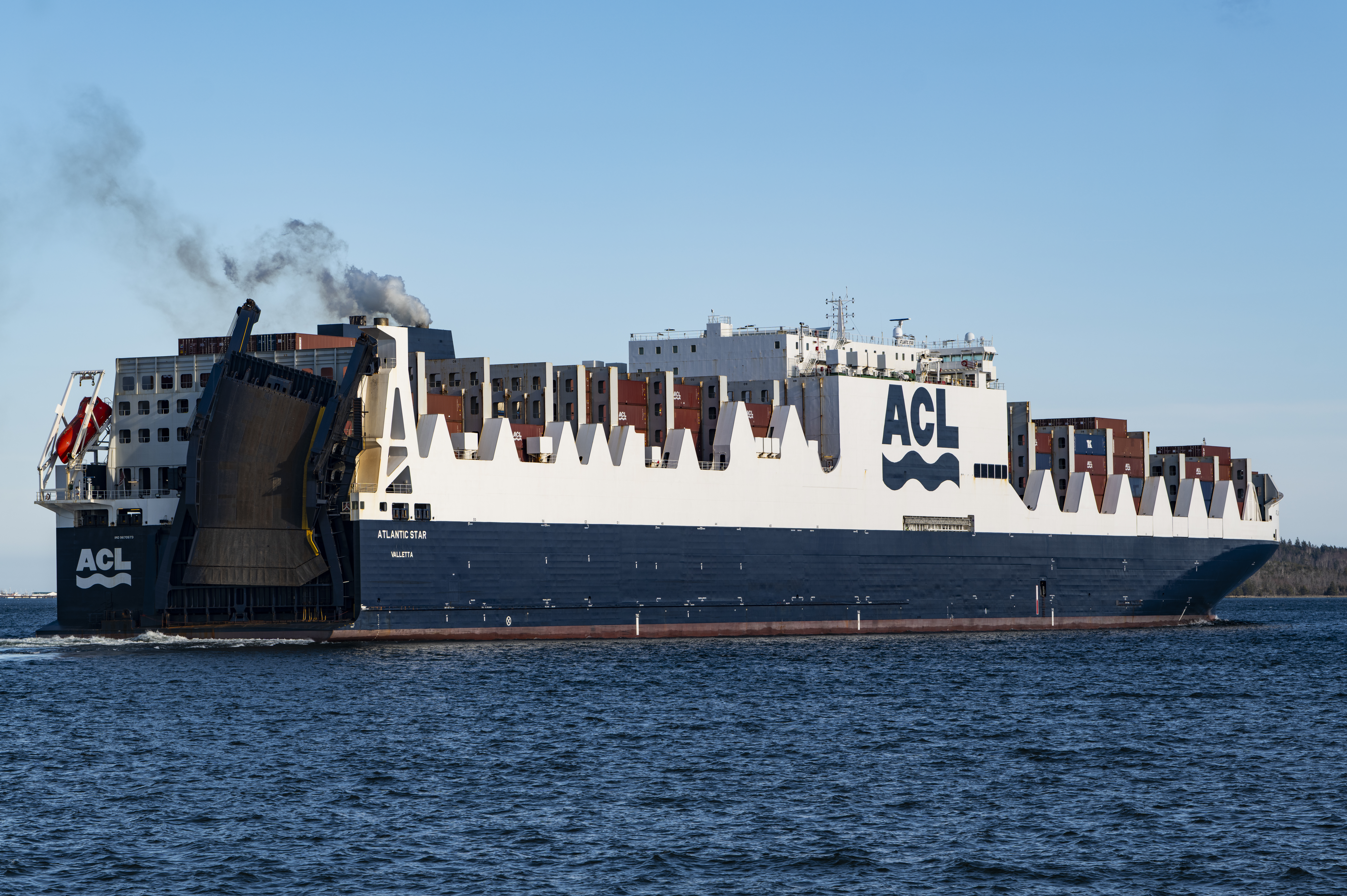
Atlantic Star; Leaving Halifax Harbour April 10th 2025

There are seven decks for roll-on/roll-off (RoRo) cargo, totaling 5,270 lane meters and 28,900 square metres (311,000 ft^{2}) of space, with a 3,807 TEU container capacity. In contrast to typical ConRO designs, which carry containers abovedecks and RoRo cargo below with the superstructure situated aft, G4 vessels carry exclusively containers at the bow through the entire depth of the hull, with RoRo garage space primarily amidships in and below the superstructure, and containers above decks at the stern, with Ro/Ro space and the machinery belowdecks. This configuration allows for greater cargo capacity, as well as lower ballast requirements. Unusually for cargo vessels, the G4 design does not include a bulbous bow, instead specifying a vertical prow that is more efficient across a wide range of cargo loads and sea conditions.
