= Atlantic Container Line =

American shipping company

- Founded: 1965; 61 years ago
- Founder: Olof Wallenius
- Headquarters: Westfield, New Jersey
- Area served: North Atlantic
- Key people: Andy Abbott, CEO
- Services: Freight transportation
- Parent: Grimaldi Group
- Website: www.aclcargo.com

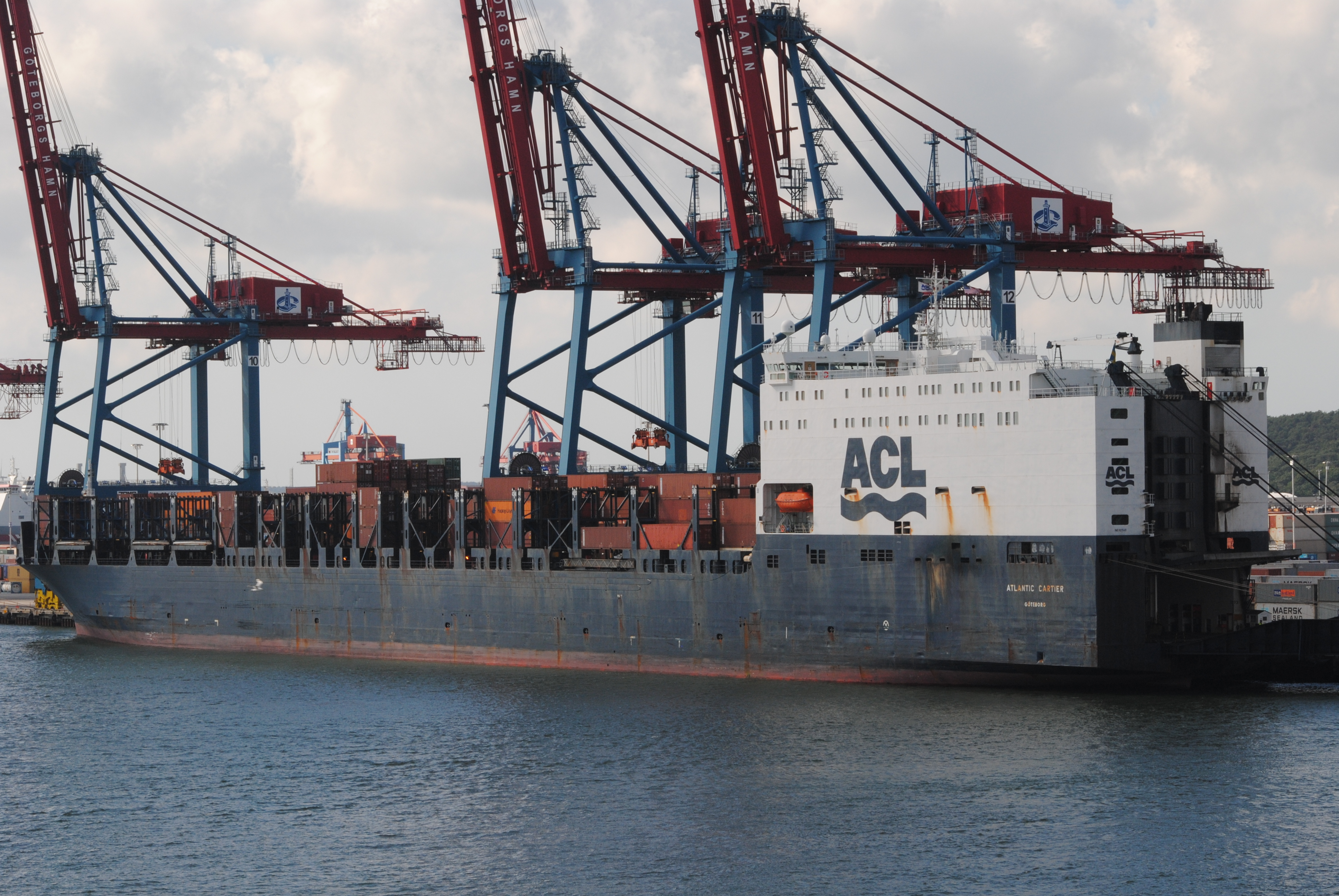
Atlantic Cartier in Gothenburg

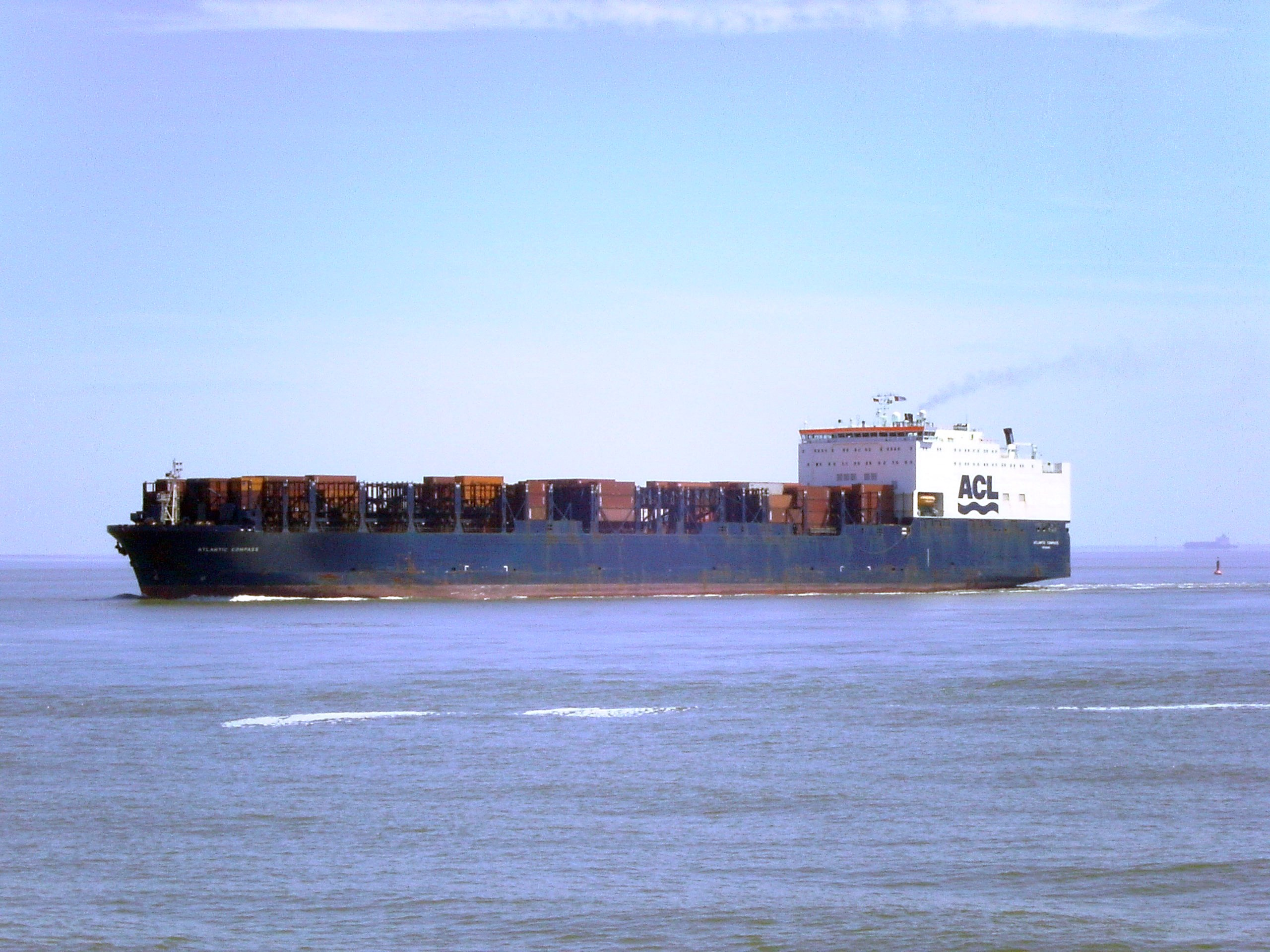
Atlantic Compass on the Elbe

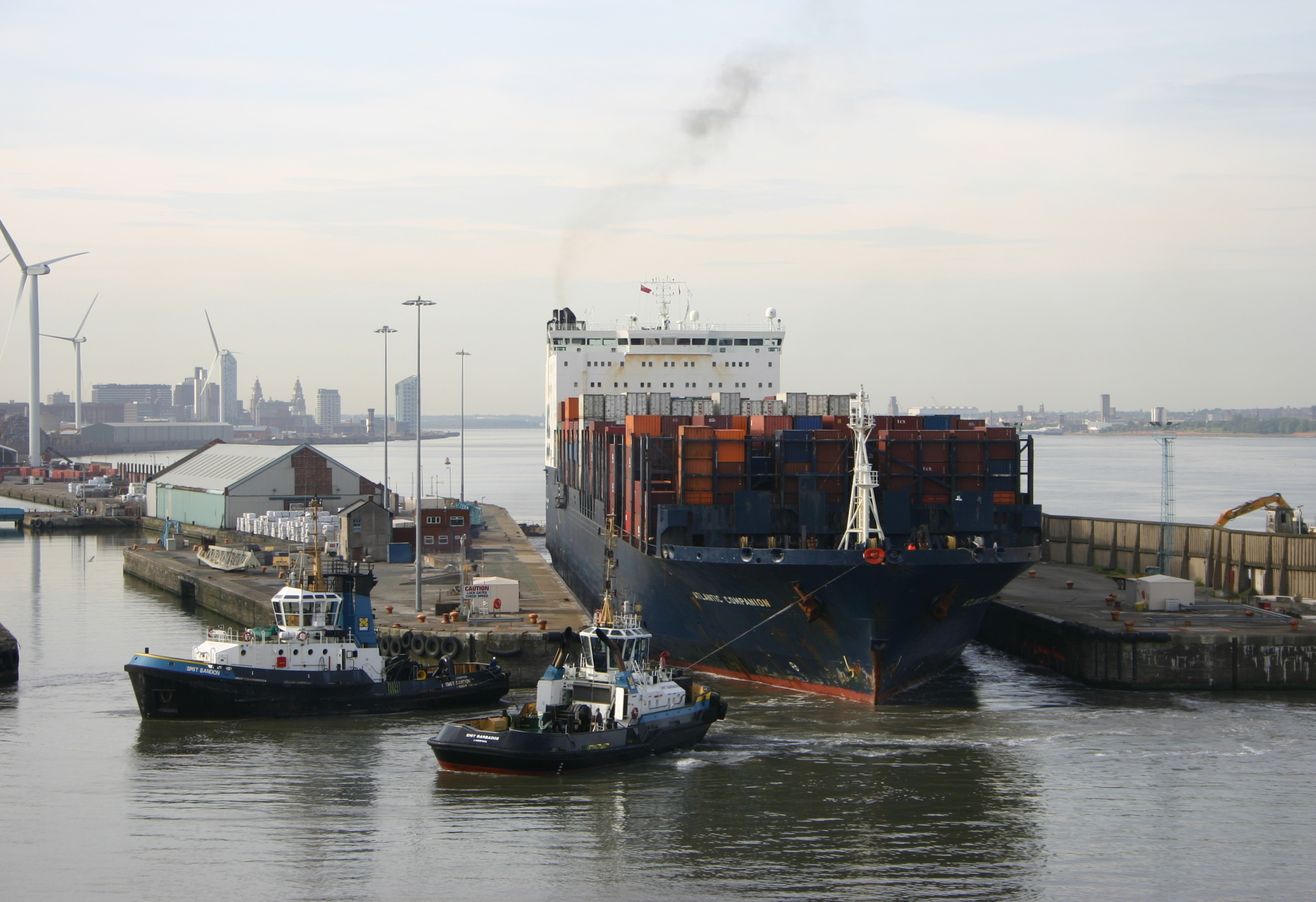
Atlantic Companion arriving at Liverpool

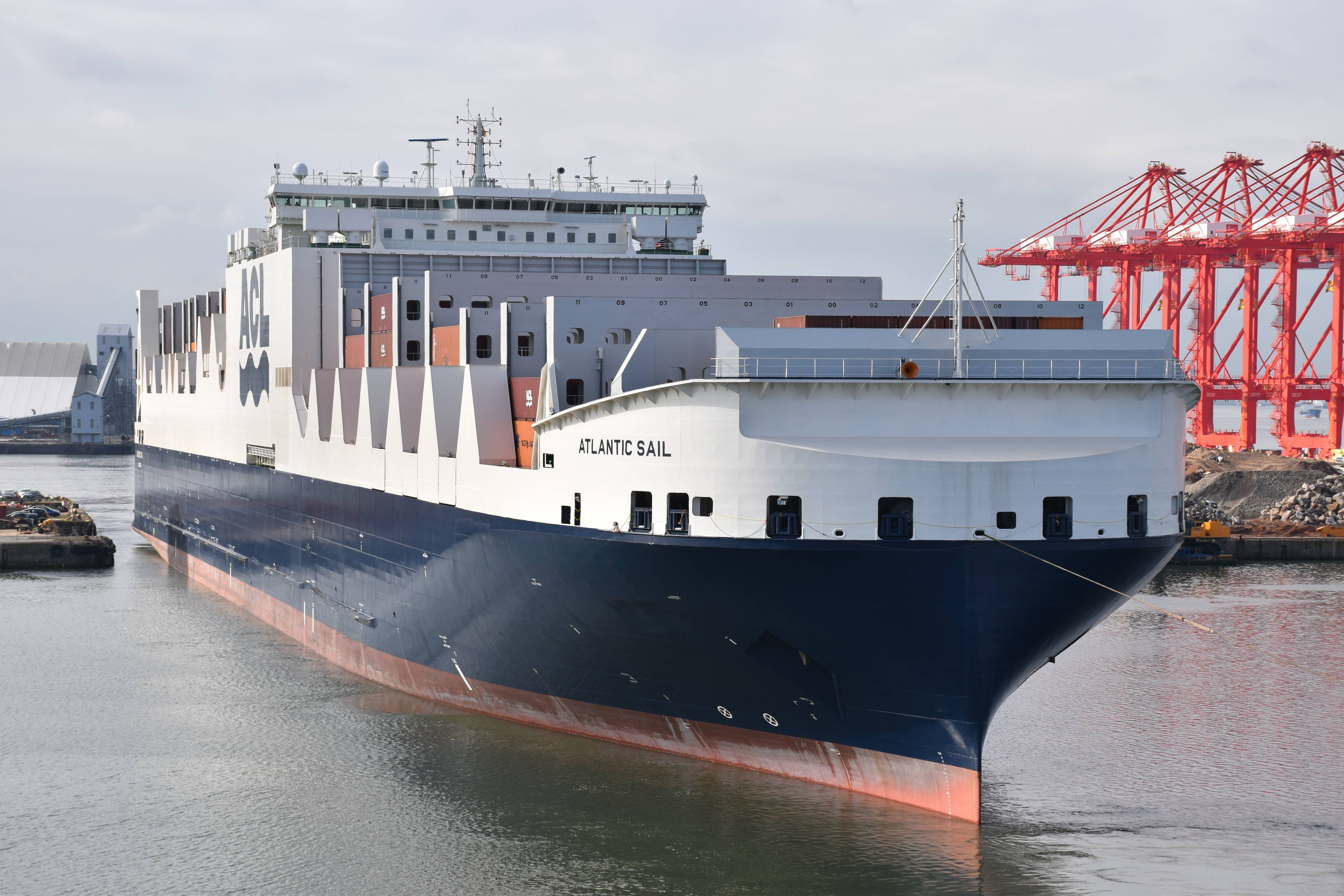
Generation 4 class Atlantic Sail

Atlantic Container Line is an American, previously Swedish, shipping company owned by the Italian Grimaldi Group. The company operates large roll-on/roll-off (RORO) container ships between Europe and North America.

== History ==
ACL was formed in Stockholm in 1965 by Olof Wallenius who created a consortium, which consisted of four shipping companies, Wallenius Lines, Swedish America Line, the Rederi AB Transatlantic and Holland America Line, to handle both growing competition and the massive capital required in face of increasing containerization of the liner traffic on the North Atlantic. These were joined by Cunard and CGT in 1967.

In 1976 ACL took over the Care Line, its ships, Mont Royal and Montmorency, and its direct route to Montreal.

During the Falklands War the British registered Atlantic Conveyor and Atlantic Causeway were requisitioned by the Ministry of Defence. Atlantic Conveyor sank on 25 May 1982 after being hit by two Argentine Exocet missiles. She is the only British flagged merchant ship sunk by missile.

== Fleet ==
=== Current ships ===
The new Generation 4 ships, introduced in 2015, are faster and more fuel efficient than their predecessors. They are still ConRO, combination roll-on/roll-off (RORO) and container, ships but with the accommodation in the middle of the ship rather than at the stern as in the previous generation.

Name	Built	In service	Tonnage	Notes
Atlantic Star	2015	2015-	100,430 GRT	
Atlantic Sail	2016	2016-	100,430 GRT	
Atlantic Sea	2016	2016-	100,430 GRT	
Atlantic Sky	2017	2017-	100,430 GRT	
Atlantic Sun	2017	2017-	100,430 GRT	

=== Previous ships ===
Name	Built	In service	Tonnage	Owner	Notes
Atlantic Saga	1967	1967–1987	12,231 GRT	SAL	Broken up 1987
Atlantic Song	1967	1967–1987	11,771 GRT	OW	Broken up 1987
Atlantic Span; Atlantic Service	1967	1967-1984; 1984-1987	11,995 GRT	Transatlantic	Broken up 1987
Atlantic Star	1967	1967–1987	15,055 GRT	HAL	Broken up 1987
Atlantic Causeway	1969	1969–1986	14,946 GRT	Cunard	Broken up 1987
Atlantic Champagne	1969	1969–1985	15,351 GRT	CGT	Broken up 1985
Atlantic Crown	1969	1969–1985	15,489 GRT	HAL	Broken up 1985
Atlantic Cinderella	1970	1970–1985	15,437 GRT	OW	Broken up 1985
Atlantic Cognac	1970	1970–1985	15,351 GRT	CGT	Broken up 1985
Atlantic Conveyor	1970	1970–1982	14,946 GRT	Cunard	Sunk during Falklands War
Atlantic Premier	1972	1978–1982	10,998 GRT	SAL	Ex Mont Royal. Broken up 2004
Atlantic Prelude	1972	1978–1983	11,148 GRT	OW	Ex Montmorency. Broken up 2005
Atlantic Project	1978	1978–1981	5,466 GRT	Stena	Chartered from Stena Line
Atlantic Prosper	1978	1978–1981	5,466 GRT	Stena	Chartered from Stena Line, Sunk 2006
Atlantic Companion	1984	1984-2015	57,225 GRT	Transatlantic	Sold for scrap to Alang, India Sep 2015
Atlantic Concert	1984	1984- 2016	57,225 GRT	Transocean	Lengthened in Japan 1987. Scrapped in 2016
Atlantic Compass	1984	1984- 2016	57,225 GRT	OW	Lengthened in Japan 1987. Scrapped in 2016
Atlantic Cartier	1985	1985- 2017	57,225 GRT	OW	Lengthened in Japan 1987. Sold for scrap 2017 to Alang, India
Atlantic Conveyor	1985	1985- 2017	57,225 GRT	Cunard	Lengthened at Scott Lithgow's Clyde shipyard, Glasgow Scotland 1987. Sold for scrap 2017 to Alang, India

== See also ==
- List of largest container shipping companies
- Grimaldi Group
- Ocean Network Express
- Nippon Yusen Kaisha
- American Roll-on Roll-off Carrier
- Messina Line
