= Grimaldi Group =

Shipping & logistics company

Grimaldi Group SpA

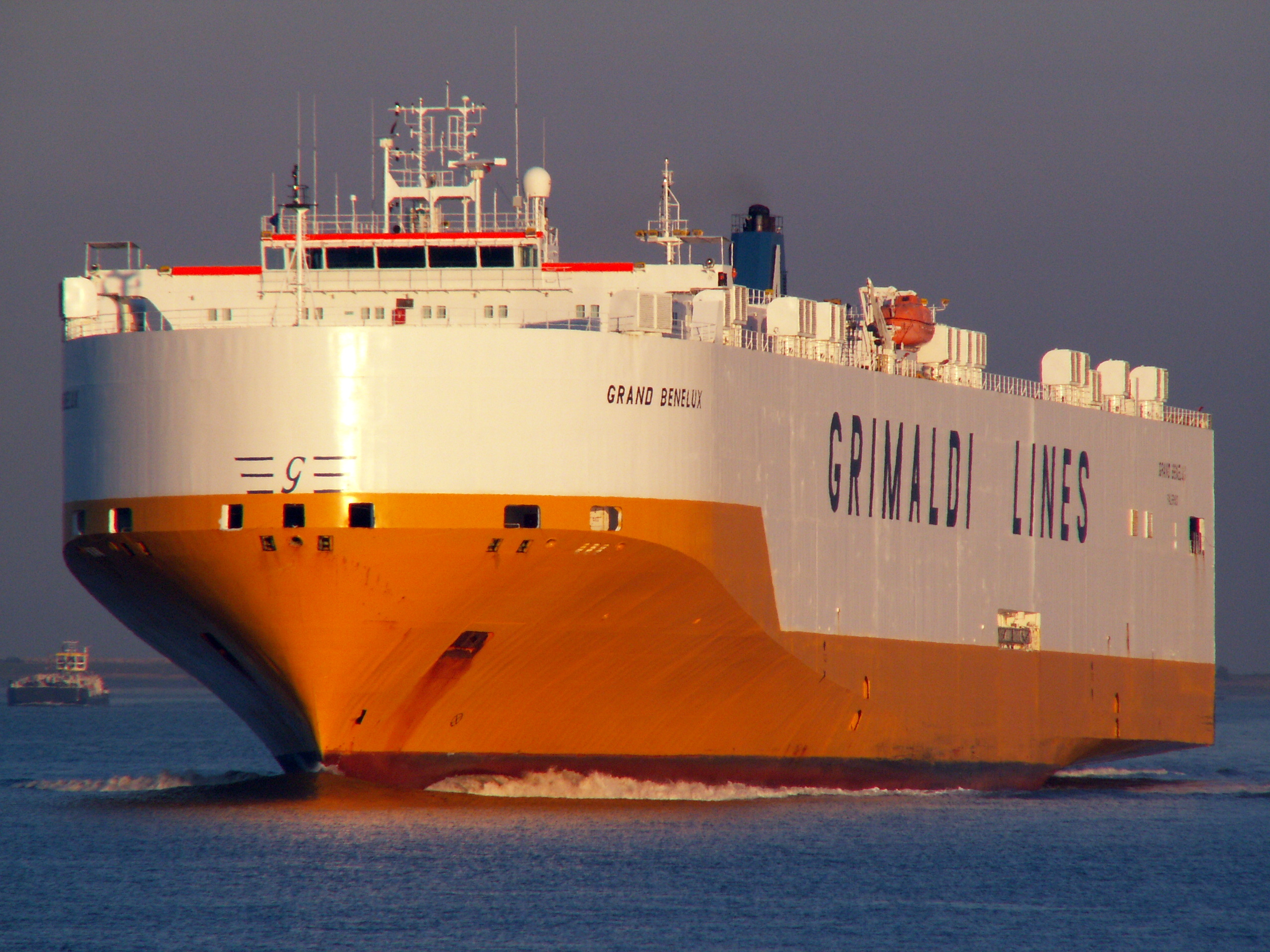
- Genre: Shipping
- Founded: 1947
- Founder: Guido, Luigi, Mario, Aldo and Ugo Grimaldi
- Headquarters: Palermo; Naples, Italy
- Key people: Gianluca Grimaldi; Emanuele Grimaldi; Diego Pacella
- Services: Shipping; Terminals; Logistics
- Subsidiaries: Finnlines; Minoan Lines; ACL; Grimaldi Lines
- Website: www.grimaldi.napoli.it

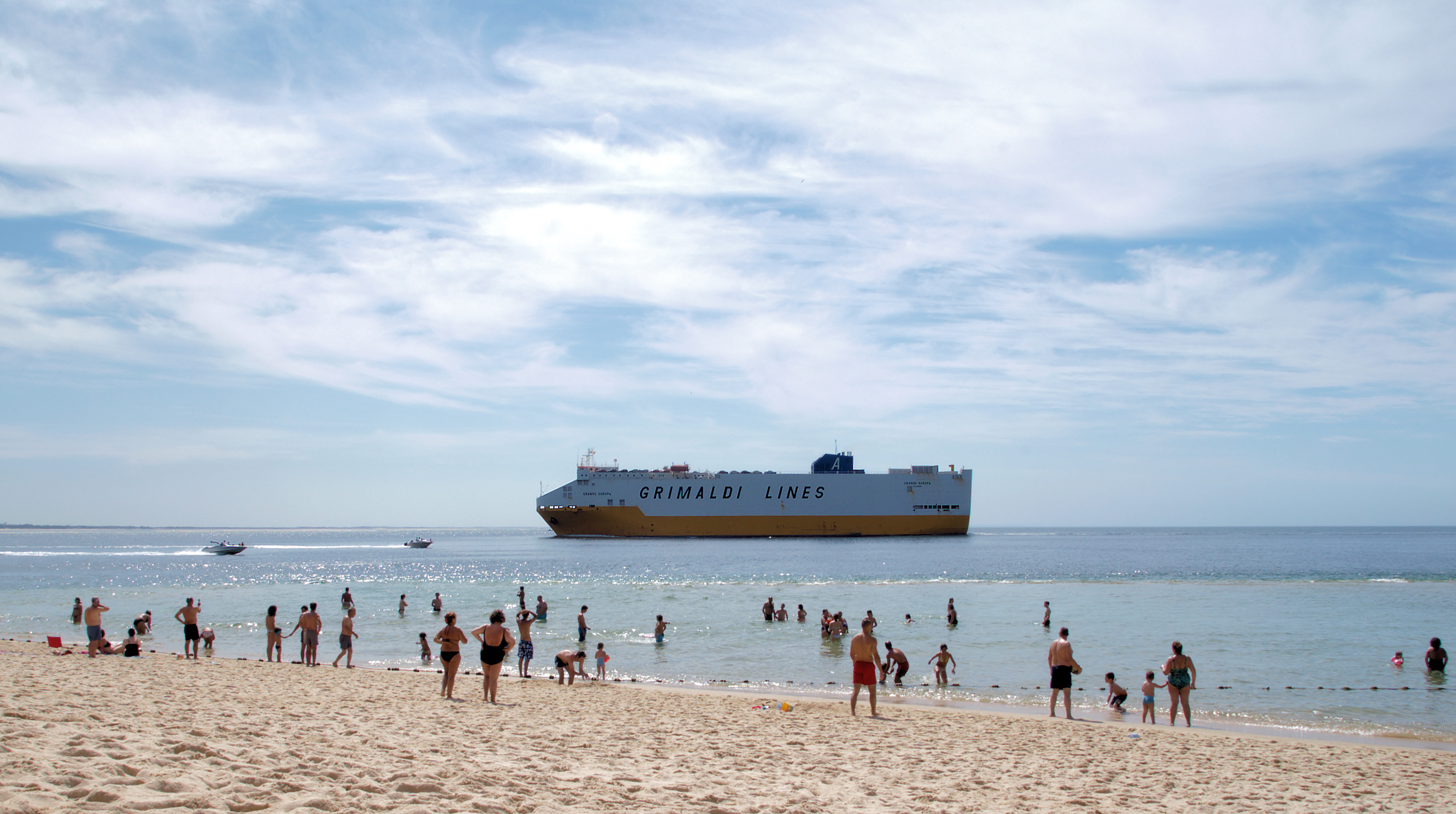
Lines ship Grande Europa heading for Setúbal

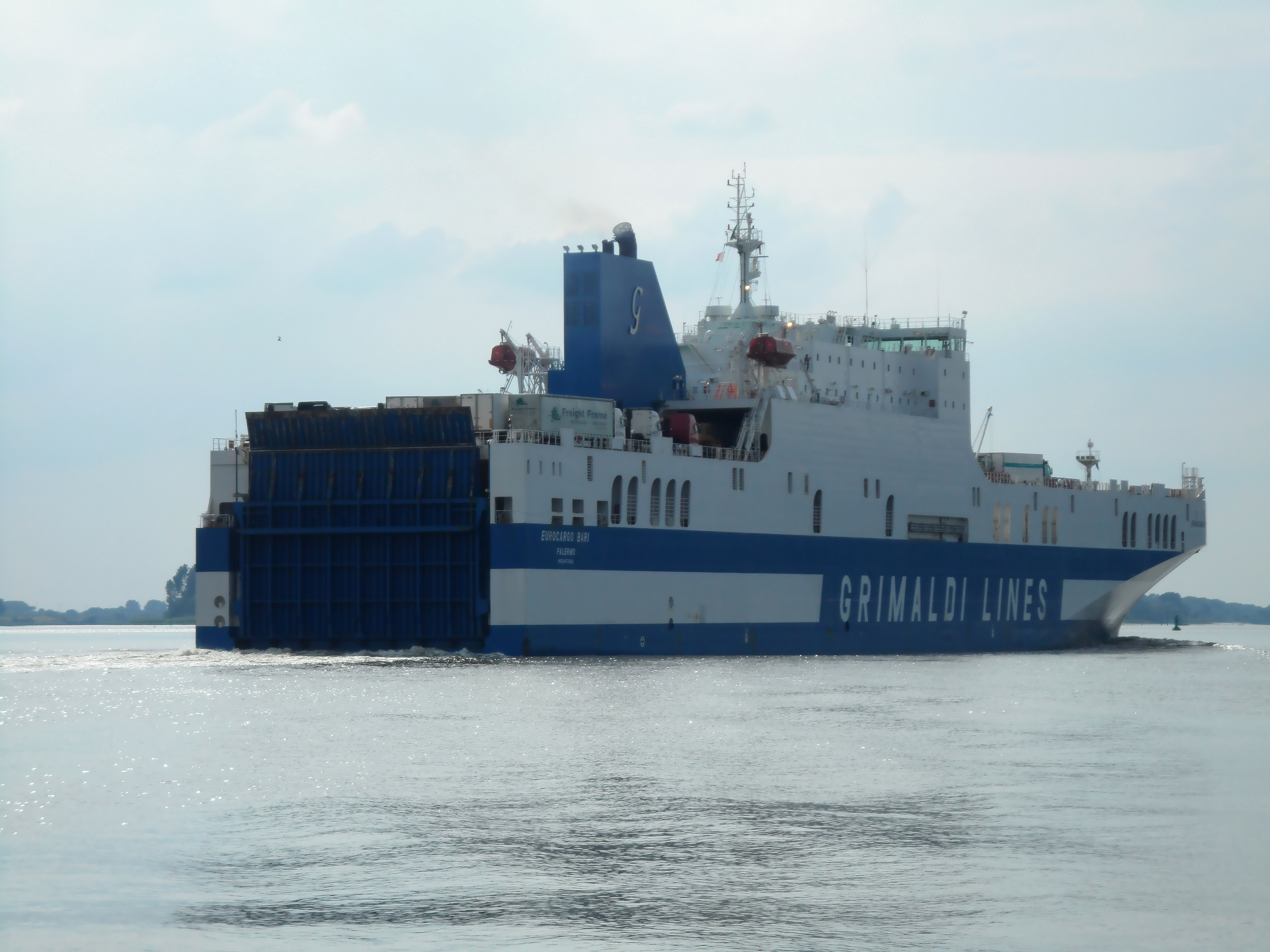
Lines ferry Eurocargo Bari on the river Elbe

The Grimaldi Group is a private shipping company owned by the Grimaldi family (Emanuele Grimaldi) and based in Naples, Italy. Grimaldi operates a large fleet of ro-ro, ro-ro/multipurpose, con-ro multipurpose, PCTC (Pure Car and Truck Carrier), ro-pax and cruise ferries vessels.

== Shipping ==
The Grimaldi Group is a conglomerate of companies linked to the logistics business with a main focus on shipping. The main brands of the company are:

- Grimaldi Lines – covering the activities of two companies, Grimaldi Euromed and Grimaldi Deepsea, including maritime transport of cargo and passengers in the Mediterranean as well as freight only services between the Mediterranean, Northern Europe, West Africa, North and South America
- Atlantic Container Line (ACL) – Roll-on roll-off and container-based cargo services in the North Atlantic
- Minoan Lines – a ferry company sailing between Italy and Greece and within Greece
- Finnlines – a ferry company operating in Northern Europe and in the Baltic Sea
- Malta Motorways of the Sea – a ferry company operating between Malta and other Mediterranean countries

== History ==
House flag used by Grimaldi Group

The Grimaldi family has had links to shipping for many generations. According to their own records, the oldest written records linking the Grimaldi family to shipping dates back to 1348, when three Grimaldi brothers received a precious relic as a guarantee for the chartering of three ships, and the newest member inherited the company (Emanuele Grimaldi the first).

The current Grimaldi companies can be traced back to the middle of the 19th century when Italian shipowner Gioacchino Lauro started a steamboat company. His son Achille expanded that shipping company and, in the middle of the 20th century, it became one of the largest shipping companies in the world. At that time, Giovanni Grimaldi was a lawyer who was married to the sister of above Achille Lauro. Amelia Grimaldi-Lauro asked her brother Achille to take her son Guido under his wings, and this brought the Grimaldi family back into the shipping business. It was this son, Guido, who founded the group in 1947 with his brothers Luigi, Mario, Aldo, and Ugo by buying a Liberty ship. In those years, passenger transatlantic travelling reached its peak. The Grimaldi brothers realized the needs of the market and promptly started to transport passengers, focusing on Mediterranean- South America routes, with comfortable ships that regularly connected Italy to Buenos Aires, Caracas and other ports.

Since the early 1960s, coinciding with Italy's economic boom, the Liberty ships were replaced with modern bulk carrier and tankers units, which enhanced the group in the transport of goods. For the Grimaldis, however, the turning point came in 1969, when the brothers inaugurated a new regular service between Italy and the United Kingdom, specifically dedicated to the transport of brand new vehicles. In a few years, all the major international car manufacturers knew Grimaldi and chose the company for the transport of their vehicles between Europe and the Mediterranean. Since then rolling freight has been the driving force of the growth of the group.

Over the last decades, the group proceeded with an expansion policy of its maritime network, of its fleet and shore services. The group's fleet increased from 36 units to over 130 ships and the brand became a landmark for the biggest vehicle manufacturers worldwide.

At the same time the group evolved to an integrated logistics operator, running a network of 22 owned port terminals located in the Mediterranean, Northern Europe and West Africa (with a total surface of about 6.2 million m2) and managing various land transport companies for door-to-door distribution of brand new vehicles. In the last decades, the group has also strongly invested in the development of the Motorways of the Sea in the Mediterranean and Baltic Seas, thus promoting EU's policy of shifting goods from the road to more environmentally friendly transport solutions. The Motorways of the Sea network was further extended between 2006 and 2008 with the acquisition of Finnlines, leader in the Baltic region, and Minoan Lines, leader in the Adriatic Sea, totalling today more than 120 routes.

=== Tonnage ===
The Grimaldi Group fleet includes over 130 ships, of which about 120 are owned, with an average age significantly below the industry average as well as the useful life of the ships. These young and modern units are deployed on regular services in a network that connects over 140 ports in 50 countries and 4 continents. In recent years, the group has invested heavily in the renewal and strengthening of its fleet, firstly by designing and commissioning the construction of new high-performance units with a reduced environmental impact. At the same time, numerous ships already in operation have undergone important green conversion works. About 80% of the group's ships are dedicated to freight-only transport between Europe, the Near East, Africa, North and South America. The remaining units are deployed for the mixed transport of freight and passengers in Europe (Mediterranean Sea, Baltic Sea and North Sea).

=== Freight-only transport ===
- Ro-ro ships for short sea connections, mainly dedicated to the transport of rolling freight and cars and regularly operating in the Mediterranean, the Baltic Sea and the North Sea. Finnlines’ ice class vessels, which are specially designed to navigate through sea ice, also belong to this category. The Grimaldi Group has recently made important investments for the strengthening of its ro-ro fleet. Between November 2020 and January 2021, the first three GG5G-class (Grimaldi Green 5th Generation) hybrid ro-ro vessels entered service in the Mediterranean. These ships use fossil fuel in navigation and electricity during the stop in port, guaranteeing Zero emission in Port thanks to the presence onboard of mega lithium-ion batteries. Nine of the twelve GG5G-class vessels will be operated under the Grimaldi Lines brand in the Mediterranean, while the other three will be delivered to Finnlines, which will use them to enhance freight connections in Northern Europe. All GG5G-class units will be delivered in 2021–2022.
- PCTC (Pure Car & Truck Carrier) and ro-ro multipurpose ships: extremely flexible vessels which can transport any type of rolling freight (trucks, tractors, buses, excavators, etc.) and special cargo (railway waggons, helicopters, etc.). These ships are mainly used in the Mediterranean Sea as part of the Euromed network as well as in trade between Europe and North America. A recent order from the Grimaldi Group covered seven new highly innovative PCTC vessels that stand out for their size, flexibility and efficiency. Six of these units are already operational, while the last one will be delivered in the first half of 2021.
- Con-ro ships for the transport of containers and rolling freight on deep sea routes. Thanks to the combination of the stern ramps and the cranes on the deck, they are able to load different types of goods independently and simultaneously. All ACL ships, operating between North America and Northern Europe, and other group ships used on routes connecting Europe, the East coast of America and West Africa, belong to this category.
- The group has recently made an order to a Korean shipyard for the construction of 6 con/ro vessels of the G5 class with delivery by 2023.

=== Ferry operations ===
The Grimaldi Group deploys around 30 ro-pax vessels for the mixed transport of goods and passengers in the Mediterranean Sea, the Baltic Sea and the North Sea. With a fleet consisting mostly of modern and comfortable ferries, cruise ferries and a luxury catamaran, the group transports rolling freight, cars and passengers between the main European ports under the Grimaldi Lines, Minoan Lines and Finnlines brands. Fleet improvement initiatives have recently involved the two flagships of the group's ro-pax fleet. The two state-of-the-art cruise ferries Cruise Roma and Cruise Barcelona – both operating since 2008 – underwent major lengthening and refurbishment works at the beginning of 2019 which further increased their energy efficiency and made them the first ships in the Mediterranean with Zero Emission in Port technology. In fact, thanks to the installation of mega lithium-ion batteries that are recharged during navigation, the vessel is capable of cutting emissions to zero during port stays. Each of the sister vessels can currently carry up to 3,500 passengers, 3,700 linear meters of rolling cargo and 271 cars. In December 2019, Finnlines finalized a new order for the construction of two ro-pax units, which will be delivered by 2023. These new ships, which will inaugurate the innovative Superstar class, will be larger and more technologically advanced than the existing units belonging to the Star class. In particular, this investment is aimed at increasing energy efficiency and further reducing the emissions generated by transport activities in the Baltic Sea, while at the same time raising the quality of the services offered to the company's passengers.

=== Cargo ===
The company specializes in the maritime transport and distribution of shipping containers, automobiles, trucks, trailers, Mafi roll trailers, heavy construction machinery and other types of rolling cargo. The core business of the Grimaldi Group is the transport of rolling and containerized goods on a global scale. The dense network of maritime connections operated links the main ports in the Mediterranean, Northern Europe, West Africa, North and South America, and is conventionally divided into Atlantic Network and Euro-Med Network. The Atlantic Network includes all lines operated between the various shores of the Atlantic Ocean and is mainly dedicated to transport of rolling freight, containers, project cargo and special cargo. The group has been operating on these lines for over 40 years, taking on the role of market leader and guaranteeing weekly departures from the main ports in North and South America, West Africa and Northern Europe. The Euro-Med Network was born in the mid-nineties. It includes frequent and regular services calling at over 50 ports in the Mediterranean (including Turkey and the Near East) and in the Baltic Region (including Russia). The Euro-Med connections are mostly dedicated to the automotive sector. The Grimaldi Group has also been the pioneer in the development of the Motorways of the Sea in Europe. The wide network of over 120 short sea routes extends in all the Mediterranean Sea, the Baltic Sea and Northern Europe. For its short sea and deep sea services, the company deploys over 130 vessels, including ro-pax ships, ro-ro vessels, pure car and truck carriers, ro-ro multipurpose and container/ro-ro ships.

== Notable incidents ==
- On 21 February 2025, a fire broke out on Grand Congo while sailing in the Atlantic ocean, in proximity with Bahamas. The crew was able to contain the fire.
- On 18 February 2025, a fire started on board of Grand Brasile while sailing in the English Channel. Crew evacuated by life boat, while the coast guard responded with a rescue operation for vessel and crew. Consequently the vessel was declared a total loss and sold for scrap in Turkey.
- On 6 July 2023, a fire started on Grand Costa D’Avorio while alongside Newark pier. Two fire fighters lost their lives while attempting to placate the flames.
- On 20 February 2023, a fire was extinguished by the crew on Grand California while sailing between from Antwerp to Italy, opposite Spanish coast.
- On 18 February 2022, a major fire broke out on Euroferry Olympia while it was in international waters near Diapontia Islands, northwest of Corfu, en route from Igoumenitsa to Brindisi, causing 11 casualties. According to the authorities, there were at least 292 people on board: 239 registered passengers and two refugees who were not officially checked in, as well as 51 crew members. Grimaldi confirmed that there were 153 vehicles on board. The fire broke out in the car deck, probably in a truck. The ship was brought closer to the north Corfu coast to offer better protection from the wind, and it was later towed to Astakos in hopes of making the fire-fighting effort easier. By 23 March the bodies of the eleven missing passengers had been recovered. The Greek Union of Lorry Drivers (SEOFAE) accused Grimaldi of overloading the ship; the company denied this, stating that passenger numbers were at only 42 per cent of capacity, all 159 lorry drivers had cabins, and overbooking of freight vehicles was prevented. The company also said that it complied with international rules forbidding passengers entering the garage decks while the ship is moving, though an Italian truck driver told RAI that he and many other truck drivers had previously camped in the ship's car deck.
- On 4 June 2020, a serious fire started on MV Höegh Xiamen while alongside Jacksonville Blount Island port, and lasted for three full days, before having been successfully extinguished by Jacksonville fire brigades. The vessel, before being finally declared a total loss, was under Grimaldi Group's time chartering and operation from Höegh Autoliners, for discharging and loading cars and used high and heavy machineries, on a regular monthly service in between Europe and US.
- On 21 November 2019 early morning, ro-pax MV Eurocargo Trieste faced a fire in her engine room. The ship departed Livorno just an hour before with over 200 vehicles on board and passengers, and was only 4 miles away from the port, when tugboats were re-deployed to berth her again, while fire brigades helped in extinguishing the fire. The reason of the accident remains unknown.
- On 7 October 2019, Euroferry Malta faced a severe storm after departing Cagliari port. Four crew members were injured while attempting to secure the cargo with lashing, and one died.
- On 15 May 2019, Grande Europa caught fire en route from Naples to Valencia close to the Balearic Islands. The vessel was carrying over 1800 motor vehicles including a 1960s Bedford SLCO bus once used for public transport in Malta and owned by comedian Johnny Vegas. Two separate fires were started hours apart in different parts of the ship. The first broke out on deck 3 at 00:45am and was extinguished by the crew within 45 minutes. Some 2.5 hours later at 4am, another fire broke out on deck 8, spread to deck 9, and required ten hours to extinguish. Half of the crew had to be evacuated by helicopter, while the other half remained on board to help the immediately deployed rescuing vessels in extinguishing the fire. The ship had to be towed to Palma de Mallorca port, and the ship's third officer was later arrested along with two other crewmembers, charged with intentionally setting both fires.
- On 10 March 2019, a fire started on the ro-ro ship Grande America off the coast of the Finistère. Travelling from Hamburg to Casablanca, it was carrying around two thousand cars including four Porsche 911 GT2 RS vehicles originally intended to be the last ever made, as well as 365 containers (some of which contained hazardous materials). Efforts to extinguish it were unsuccessful and the ship started leaning to starboard. Early on 11 March, the twenty-six crew members and the only passenger were evacuated; they were then rescued by the British frigate HMS Argyll. The Grande America sank soon afterward, causing an oil spill. The Grimaldi Group immediately dispatched in the place of sinking the Anchor Handling Supply (AHTS) vessel Union Lynx to monitor any ship's fuel spill, and organised the recovery of any floating container. Later on, the group sent there the vessel Island Pride, equipped with a modern ROV (Remotely Operated Underwater Vehicle) that reached the wreck at 4,600 metres sea depth, completed the patches on every holes and confirmed that there was no oil leakage.
- On 21 December 2018, four stowaways armed with metal bars threatened crew members on board Grande Tema travelling from Nigeria, demanding to be taken closer to the British coast. The following day, despite Essex Police stating this was not being treated as a hostage, terror or piracy-related incident, British special forces seized control of the vessel and detained all four perpetrators without casualties.
- On 8 August 2017, a seizure warrant was issued by the Dakar Port Authority for Grande Nigeria until damage repayment was arranged. The vessel had broken her moorings and accidentally collided with a ferry docked close by. Diambogne vessel suffered severe damage to her hull that caused seawater to enter the engine room.
- On 27 November 2016, while en route from Valencia to Autoport-Izmit, MV Grande Anversa collided with general cargo Sider Capri in the Çanakkale Boğazı (Strait of Çanakkale) in Turkey. Both vessels reported minor damage but had to interrupt their commercial voyages, proceeding to the anchorage to undertake investigations and surveys.
- On 22 October 2014, Grande Francia encountered extreme bad weather conditions on the way from Tilbury to Hamburg. The vessel faced severe rolling and strong gust winds that caused ten 40-foot containers to break their lashings and fall overboard.
- On 7 October 2011, Repubblica Argentina ran aground in the Western Scheldt between the North Sea and the port of Antwerp and was pulled back afloat at the next high tide.
- On 8 March 2007, Repubblica di Genova capsized during an Antwerp port stay due to possible incorrect stowage and ballast. The vessel was loading containers and vehicles. A large portion of the cargo fell overboard, however, the vessel was rescued and towed to dry dock.

=== Drug smuggling episodes ===
- On 28 January 2020, in Dakar Senegal, onboard of the MV Grande Nigeria 120 kilograms of cocaine packed in 4 bags were found by the crew in the ship's ventilation system.
- Between 14 and 16 July 2019 German customs officials confiscated 4.5 tons of cocaine hidden in 211 sports bags on the MV Grande Benin while the ship was in Hamburg. 4,200 packages of pressed cocaine had arrived aboard the ship on the route Montevideo – Antwerp. According to the ship's documentation, the container was loaded with soybeans. It was the largest seizure of drugs in the history of Germany, the approximate value of which was 1,000 million dollars, which was a sensitive blow to drug trafficking. The drugs were destroyed under strict security measures. The national director of Customs of Uruguay, Enrique Canon, resigned on 1 Aug after knowing the case of the ship which added another seizure of the drug that had left on a private flight from Carrasco International Airport in Uruguay, carrying about 600 kilos of cocaine. In both cases, the controls of the loads at the exit were not adequate. The ship had berthed in Montevideo between 12 and 19 June where the drug was probably loaded.
- On 29 June 2019, in the port of Dakar, the Senegalese customs inspected the vehicles transported by the MV Grande Nigeria, coming from South America and headed for Northern Europe, and found in some of them a hidden bust of 798 kilos cocaine. For this reason, the vessel was seized, while the Master and the Chief mate Commander – both Italians – as well as two German passengers were arrested. The release has been described as an "embarrassing affair" in the Senegalese media. It was noted that some crew members were on board the ship after the seizure in order to run the engines and that the people who held responsibility of the vessel were released and allowed to return to Italy.
- In June 2019, 3.36 tonnes of cocaine were found hidden in a load of rice on board of the Grimalid ro-ro ship Grande Francia at the port of Antwerp. This was the largest seizure of cocaine at the port of Antwerp in 2019
- On 30 November 2018, Italian authorities seized 82 kg of cocaine hidden in a Land Rover car shipped from Argentina on the MV Grande Argentina.
- In August 2018, in short succession, two Grimaldi vessels were stopped by the Brazilian authorities at Santos. On 7 August, 1.2 tons of cocaine drug was found hidden inside a container on MV Grande Nigeria. On MV Grande Francia two containers were noted with broken seals by the crew, and intruders were spotted fleeing the ship anchored at Santos roads. Consequently, 1.3 tons of cocaine was found inside the containers by local authorities on 12 August.
- On 22 February 2018, Dutch police seized 55 kilos of cocaine in Antwerp port, that was brought to the Netherlands onboard the MV Grande Amburgo.
- In April 2016 German police found 26 kilos of cocaine hidden in building machines on board of MV Grande Atlantico during a raid in Hamburg.
- On 26 March 2016, during a raid in Emden harbour, German police seized 60 kg of cocaine hidden in building machines on board of MV Grande Amburgo.
- On 19 March 2016, 20 kg of cocaine were found on board of the MV Grand Brasile during a raid by German police, when the ship was approaching Hamburg.
- On 18 January 2016, 3 kg of cocaine were intercepted by State police in Palermo, Italy, on board the MV Eurocargo Rome.
- In December 2015, 13 kg of cocaine were found to be transported by a Grimaldi ferry to Sardinia.
- On 12 May 2015, 13 kg of cocaine were seized by Italian police in "Operazione Paprika". The ro-pax ferries travelling between Civitavecchia and Barcelona were used for the transport of cocaine, hidden in passenger cars.

== Current fleet ==
Ship name	Flag	Built	Route	IMO	Tonnage	Length	Width	Passengers	Cars	Knots	Photo
Cruise Bonaria	(Italy)	2000	Livorno-Palermo	9204063	37,551	214 m	26.4 m	2,500	665	31.5	
Zeus Palace	(Italy)	2001	Livorno-Olbia	9208071	31,730	212 m	25 m	1,706	580	31.5	
Europa Palace	(Italy)	2001	Cagliari-Naples; Cagliari-Palermo	9198939	32,728	203.9 m	25 m	1,800	712	28.9	
Cruise Ausonia	(Italy)	2002	Naples-Palermo	9227429	30,902	199.9 m	25 m	1,821	649	31.2	
Catania	(Italy)	2003	Salerno-Palermo	9261554	25,955	186.5 m	25.6 m	934	480	22.5	
Venezia	(Italy)	2004	Igoumenitsa-Ancona	9304631	26,400	186 m	25.6 m	946	400	23	
Florencia	(Italy)	2004	Igoumenitsa-Ancona	9287584	26,302	186 m	25.6 m	946	400	24	
Corfu	(Italy)	2006	Civitavecchia-Cagliari Civitavecchia-Arbatax	9349758	27,522	186.5 m	25.6 m	950	400	24	
Europalink	(Italy)	2007	Igoumenitsa-Brindisi	9319454	46,124	218.8 m	30.5 m	925	366	25	
Cruise Roma	(Italy)	2008	Civitavecchia-Porto Torres- Barcelona	9351476	63,742	254 m	30.4 m	3,500	963	27.5	
Cruise Barcelona	(Italy)	2008	Civitavecchia-Porto Torres- Barcelona	9351488	63,742	254 m	30.4 m	3,500	963	27.5	
Cruise Europa	(Italy)	2009	Livorno-Olbia	9351490	54,310	225 m	30.4 m	2,850	963	27.5	
Cruise Sardegna	(Italy)	2010	Livorno-Olbia	9351505	54,310	225 m	30.4 m	2,850	963	27.5	

== Image gallery ==
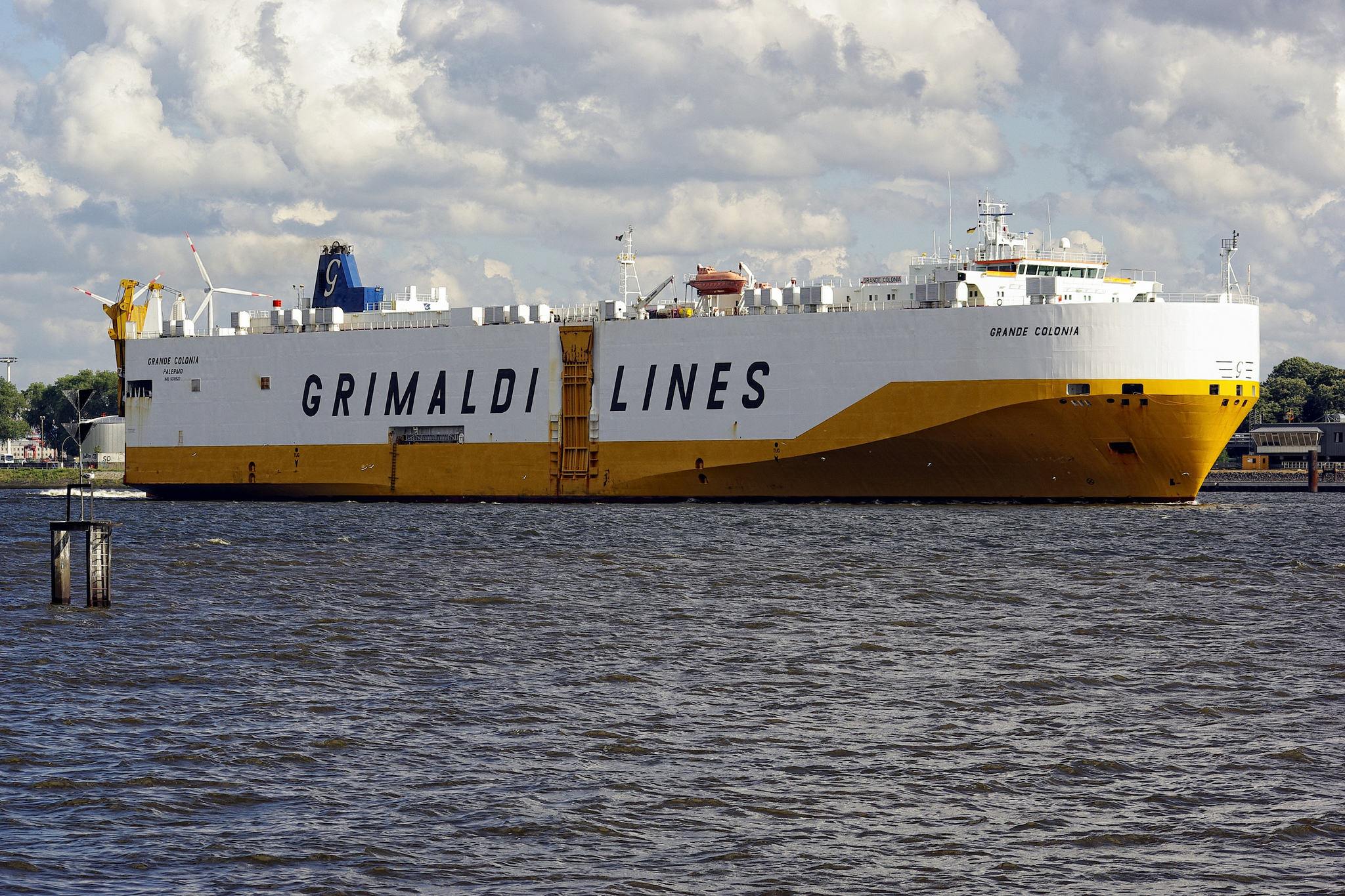
Grande Colonia

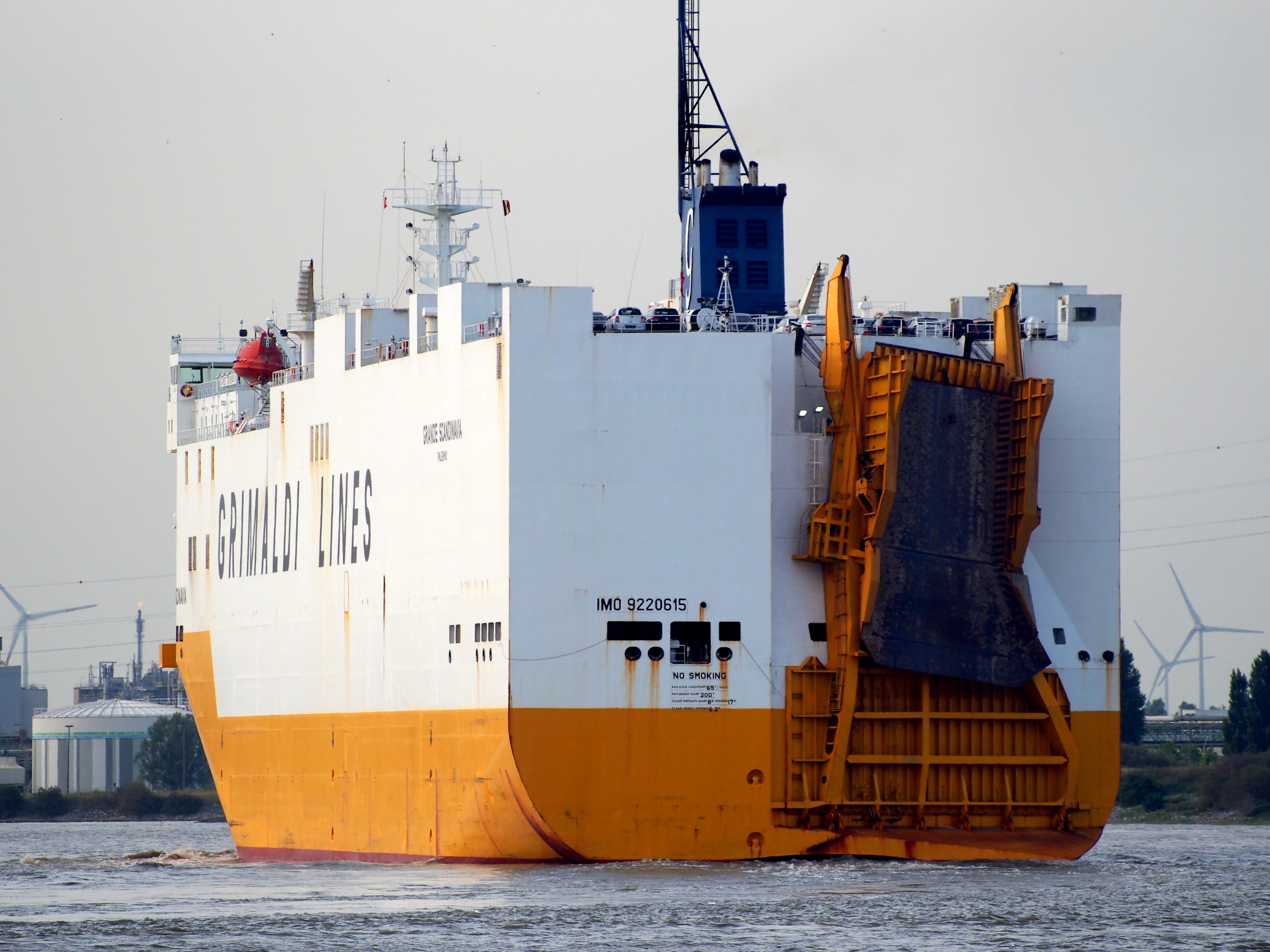
Grande Scandinavia

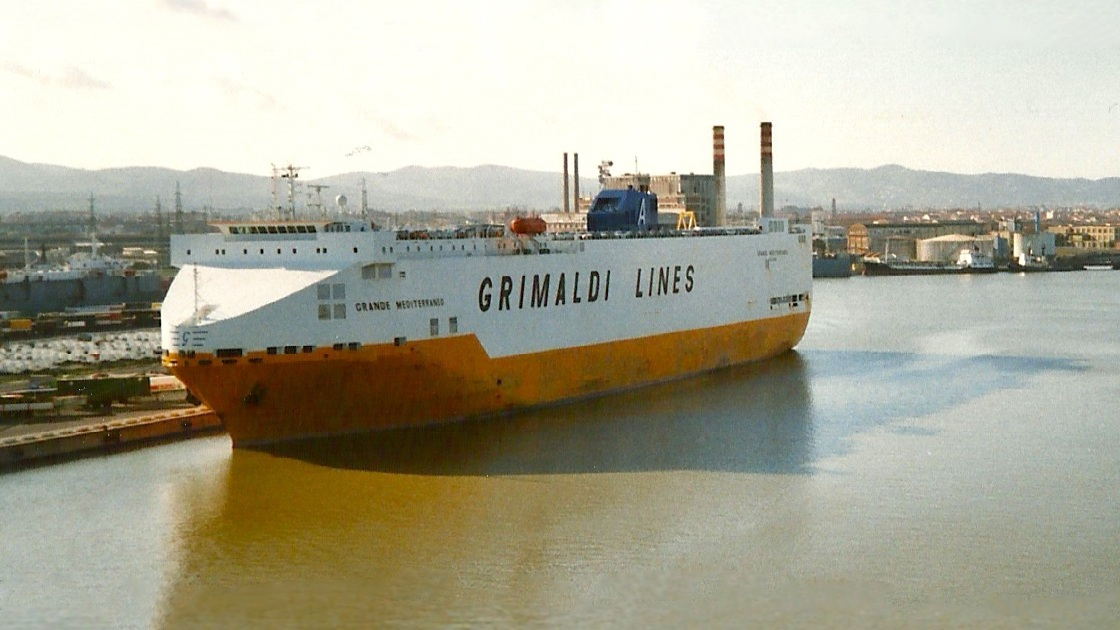
Grande Maditerraneo

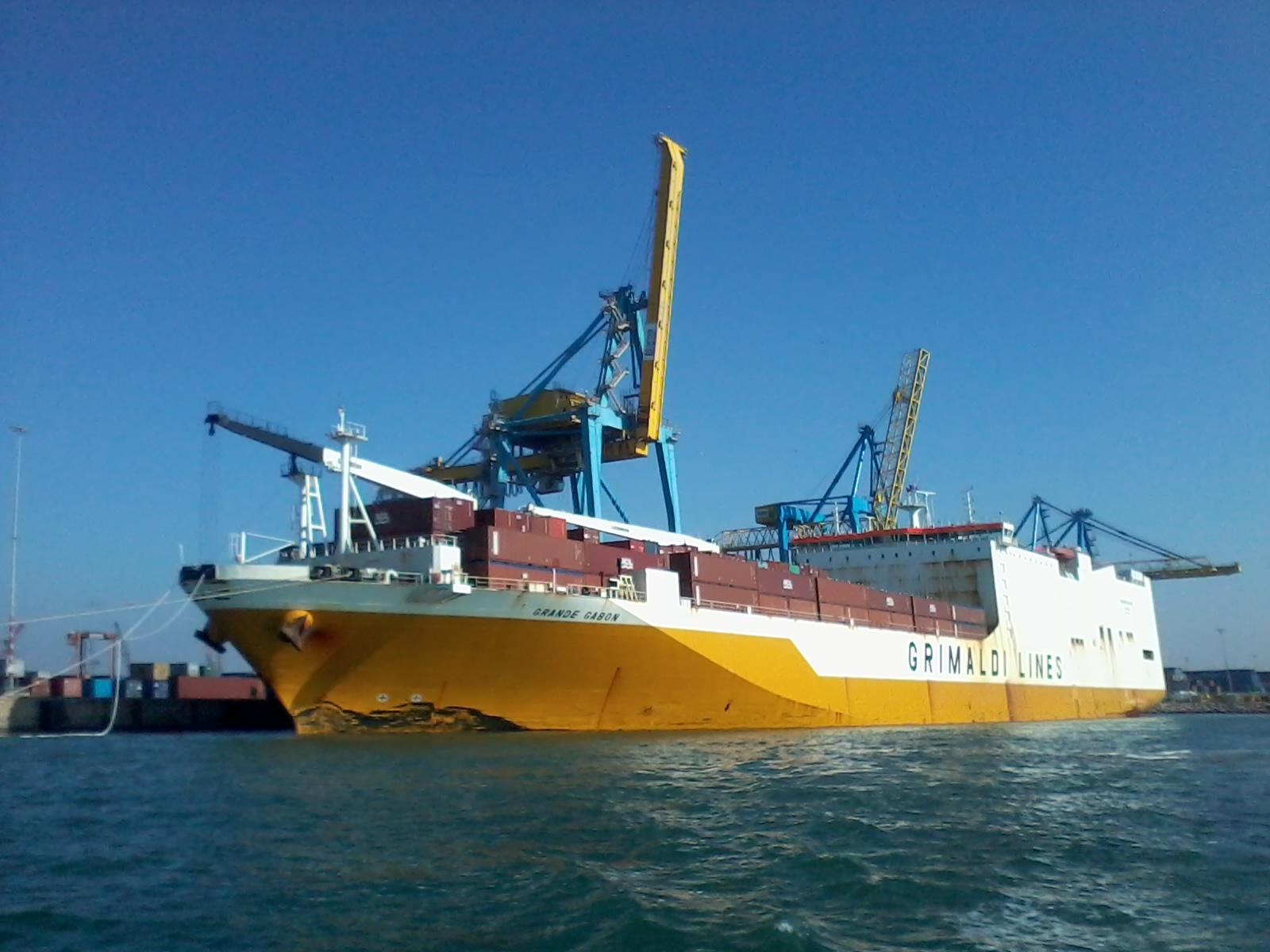
Grande Gabon

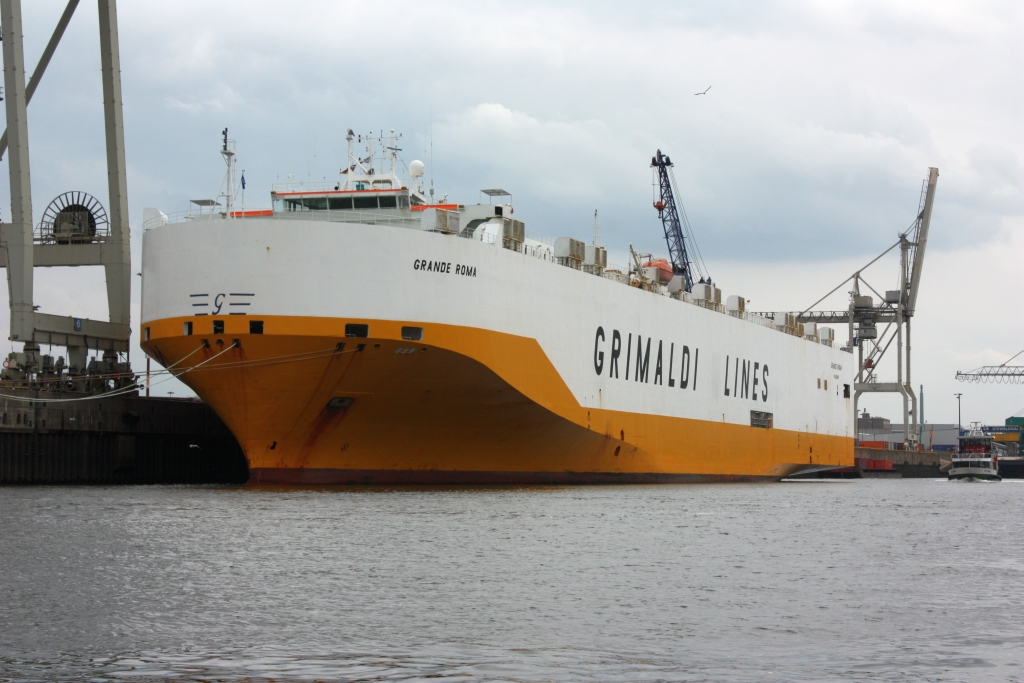
Grande Roma

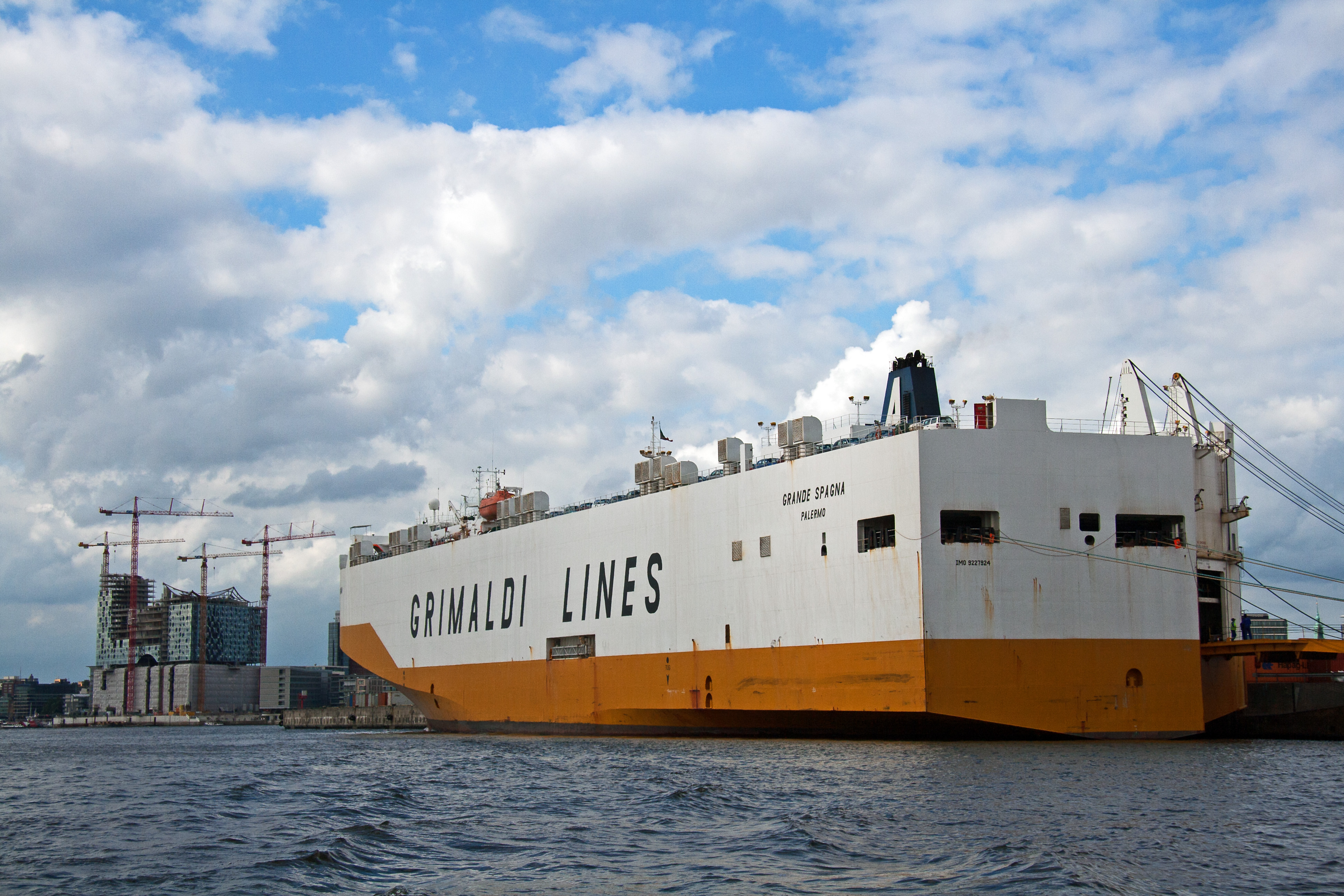
Grande Spagna

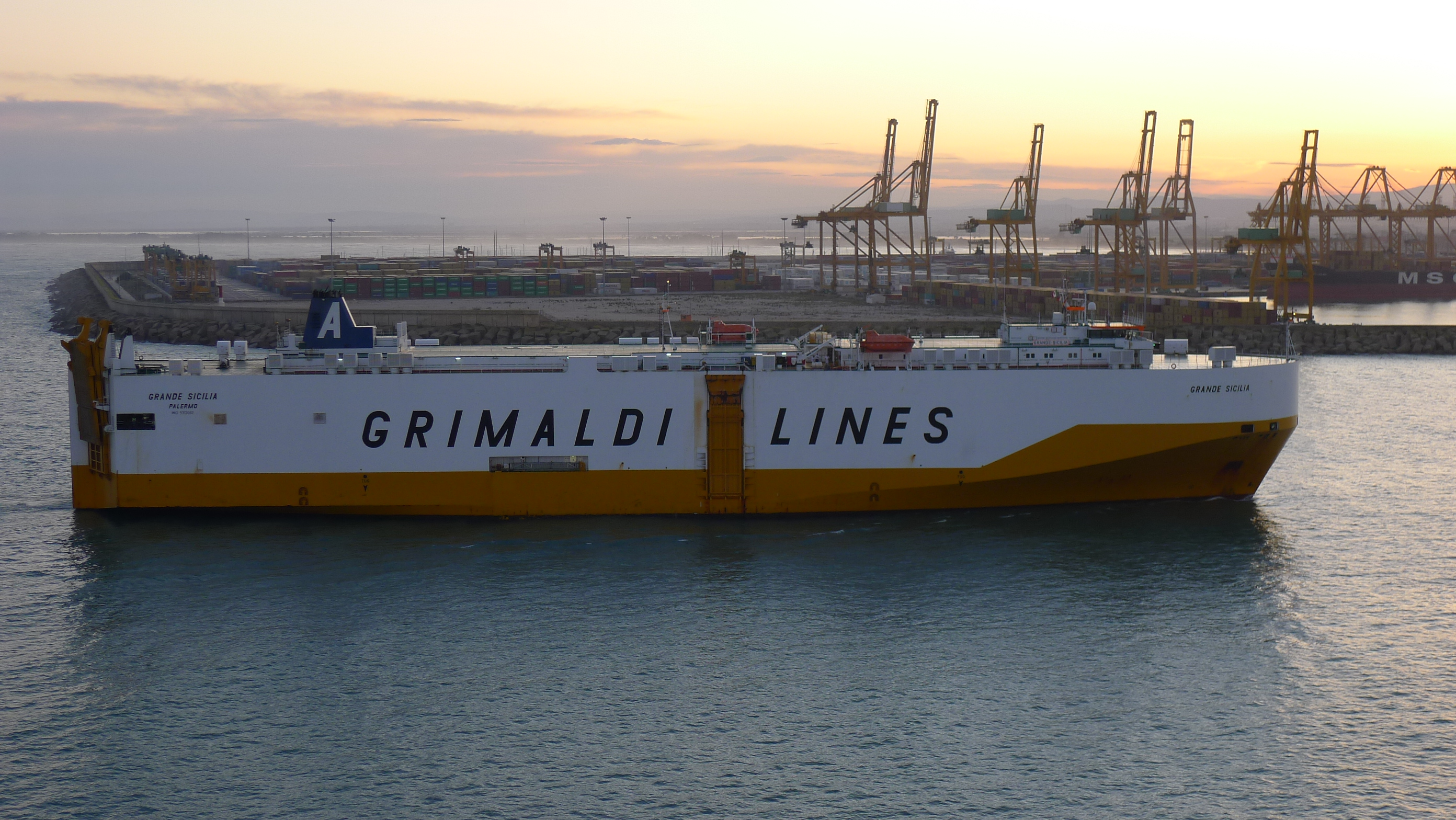
Grande Sicilia

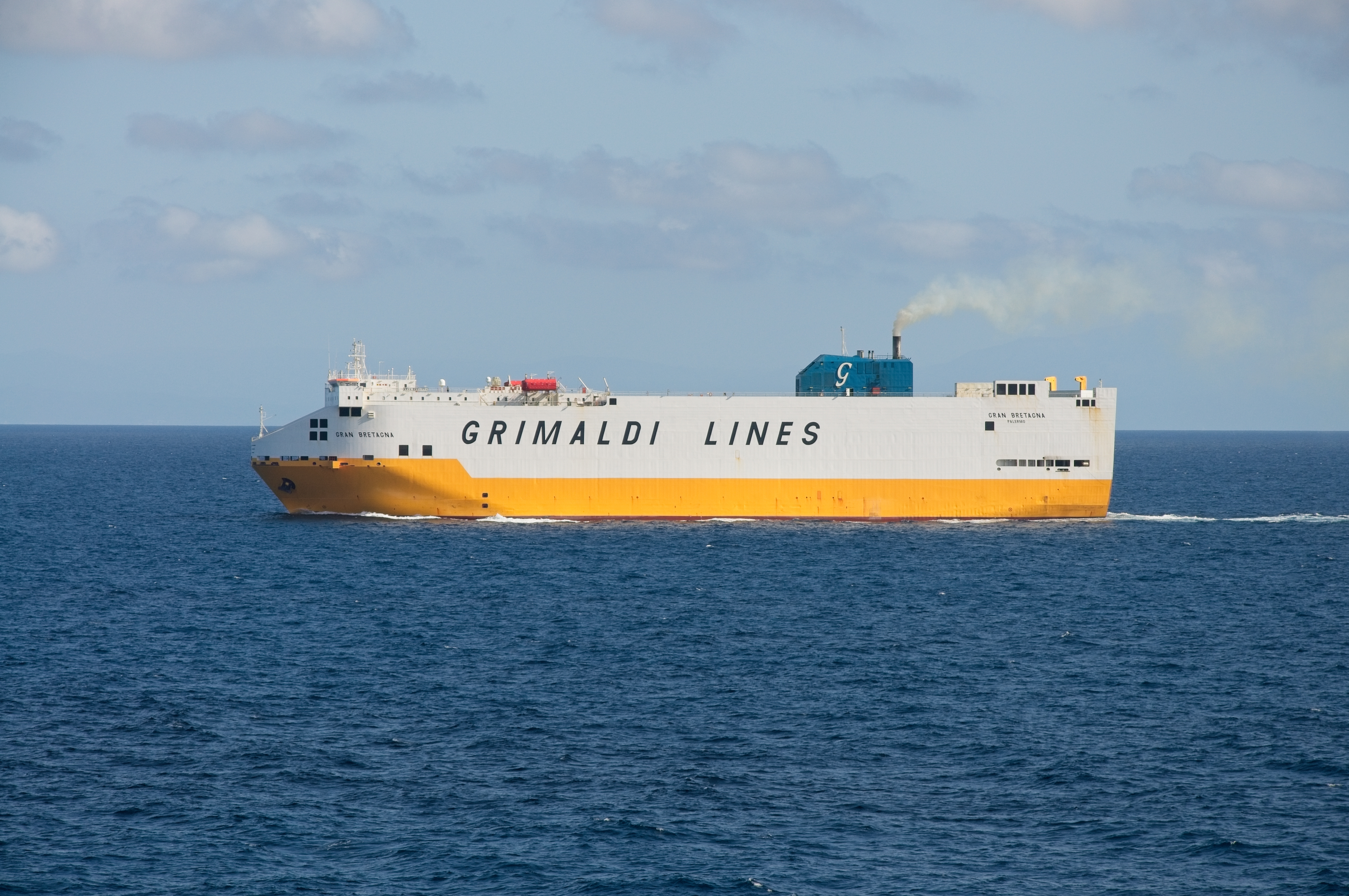
Gran Bretagna

== See also ==
- List of largest container shipping companies
- List of roll-on/roll-off vessel accidents
- Atlantic Container Line
- Messina Line
- Jadrolinija
- United European Car Carriers
- KESS - K Line Europe Short Sea
- Nissan Motor Car Carrier
- Nippon Yusen Kaisha
- Toyofuji Shipping
