= SS Atlantic Causeway =

British merchant navy ship

History

United Kingdom
- Name: Atlantic Causeway
- Operator: Cunard Line
- Builder: Swan Hunter, Tyne and Wear, United Kingdom
- Launched: 2 April 1969
- Completed: 1969
- Identification: IMO number: 6913106
- Fate: Scrapped in 1986

General characteristics
- Type: Container ship
- Tonnage: 14,946 tons
- Length: 212 m (695 ft)
- Beam: 28 m (92 ft)
- Draught: 9.1 m (29 ft 10 in)
- Propulsion: 4 steam turbines, 2 propellers
- Speed: 22 knots (41 km/h; 25 mph)

Atlantic Causeway was a container ship, operated by Cunard, and one of the merchant vessels requisitioned by the British government to support British forces in the Falklands War in 1982.

== Pre-war ==
Atlantic Causeway and her sister, Atlantic Conveyor were built by Swan Hunter as part of Cunard's contribution to Atlantic Container Line, a European shipping consortium. Atlantic Causeway was completed in 1969. With the outbreak of the Falklands War in 1982, Atlantic Conveyor was requisitioned on 14 April, and Atlantic Causeway on 4 May to serve as transport and support ships for the Royal Navy task force being sent to retake the Falkland Islands.

== Falklands War ==
Atlantic Causeway put into HMNB Devonport and was taken in hand on 6 May 1982. She was converted to be able to carry and operate helicopters. A hangar was fitted to her upper deck, and an improved system for delivering aviation fuel. She sailed from Devonport 07.30 on 12 May carrying eight Sea King HAS.2As of 825 Naval Air Squadron and twenty Wessex HU.5s of 847 Naval Air Squadron. She sailed to the Exclusion Zone via Ascension Island, arriving on 27 May, two days after her sister Atlantic Conveyor had been hit and burnt out by Exocet missiles. She then disembarked her aircraft and stores in San Carlos Water from 28 May, remaining on station with the rest of the British fleet. She took on casualties from the Royal Fleet Auxiliary ships RFA Sir Galahad and RFA Sir Tristram after they were hit by Argentinian bombs and abandoned on 8 and 9 June. Around 170 of those transferred were later returned to Britain aboard the tankers British Trent and British Test. Atlantic Causeway entered Port William on 17 June to unload further supplies, before leaving to return to Britain on 13 July. She had received around 4,000 helicopter landings and refuelled about 500 aircraft.

== Postwar ==
Atlantic Causeway was laid up in Liverpool, finally being broken up in Taiwan in 1986. Detailed plans of both Atlantic Causeway and Atlantic Conveyor are held by The National Archives.

== See Also ==
- Arapaho Containerized Aircraft Handling System, a similar joint Anglo-American program intended to host anti submarine helicopters
