= Grande America =

Ro-ro cargo built in 1997

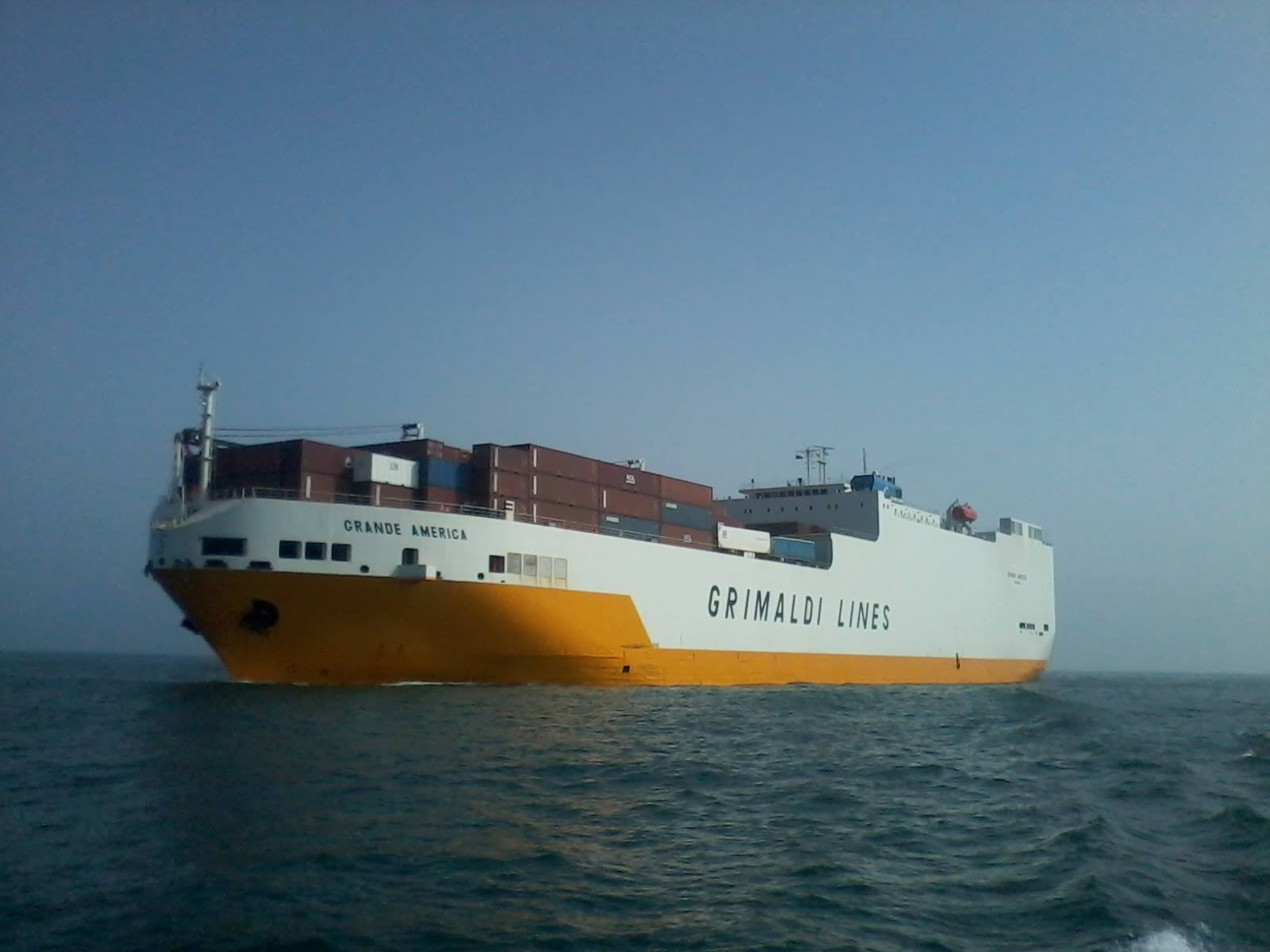
- Grande America, Casablanca, c. 2016

History
- Name: Grande America
- Owner: Grimaldi Group
- Operator: Grimaldi Lines
- Builder: Fincantieri
- Identification: IMO number: 9130937; MMSI number: 247594000; Callsign: IBPG
- Fate: Sank Bay of Biscay, March 2019

General characteristics
- Type: Ro-Ro/Container Carrier
- Tonnage: 27,965 t (27,523 long tons; 30,826 short tons)
- Displacement: 56,642 t (55,747 long tons; 62,437 short tons)
- Length: 214 m (702 ft)
- Beam: 31 m (102 ft)
- Installed power: 1 diesel engine
- Propulsion: single shaft, 1 screw
- Speed: 14.5 kn (26.9 km/h; 16.7 mph)

Grande America was a roll-on/roll-off cargo ship built by Fincantieri in 1997, owned and operated by Grimaldi Lines, a subsidiary of Grimaldi Group. It sank in the Bay of Biscay in March 2019.

== Sinking ==
On 10 March 2019, Grande America caught fire while travelling the Atlantic Ocean between France and Spain on its route from Hamburg, Germany to Casablanca, Morocco, and sank 4,600 m (15,100 ft) into the Bay of Biscay on 12 March. The 27 people on board were rescued by the Royal Navy ship HMS Argyll after they abandoned ship on 11 March.

After their lifeboat's engine broke down entering the water, a Royal Navy sea boat towed it to safety in a 6 m (20 ft) swell. Leading Seaman David Groves, the sea boat coxswain, was later awarded the Queen's Gallantry Medal for his bravery in the rescue.

=== Oil spill ===
Grande America oil spill
- Interactive map of Grande America oil spill
- Location: Bay of Biscay, France
- Coordinates: 46.068889°N 5.784444°W
- Date: 12 March 2019; 7 years ago

Cause
- Cause: Foundering of the Grande America cargo ship
- Operator: Grimaldi Lines

Spill characteristics
- Volume: c. 2,200 tonnes (4,900,000 lb) marine fuel (metric tonnes)
- Area: c. 10 km (6.2 mi) × 1 km (0.62 mi)

An oil spill of about 10 km (6.2 mi) in length and 1 km (0.62 mi) in width began moving towards the French coast line, threatening the areas around La Rochelle, Biarritz and Vendée. The ship was carrying 365 containers, of which 45 contained material deemed to be hazardous, including 10 tonnes of hydrochloric acid and 70 tonnes of sulfuric acid.

=== Cargo ===
The ship contained dozens of vehicles that were to be delivered to Brazil, including 37 Porsches. Four of these were Porsche's last units of the 911 GT2 RS, which had gone out of production in February 2019. The sinking led to Porsche reactivating the production line for the 911 GT2 RS, so that these four orders could be fulfilled. The ship was also transporting dozens of Audi cars, including RS4 and RS5s.

=== Wreck ===
The wreck was located by Island Pride (a vessel leased to Ocean Infinity). It arrived 30 March and started inspecting the wreck site using remotely operated underwater vehicles (ROVs). The ROVs were used to seal light leaks of oil discovered during the inspection.

== See also ==
- List of roll-on/roll-off vessel accidents
