= Cruise Barcelona =

Cruise ferry built in Italy

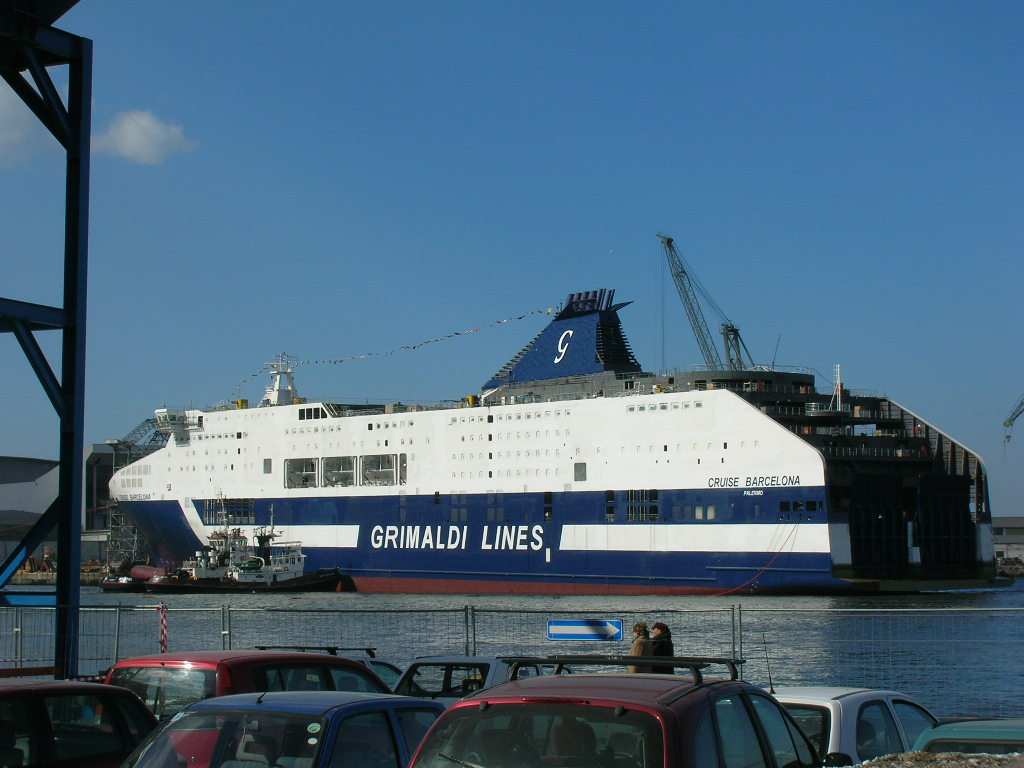
- Cruise Barcelona

History
- Name: Cruise Barcelona
- Owner: Grimaldi Group
- Operator: Grimaldi Lines
- Port of registry: Palermo, Italy
- Builder: Fincantieri, Castellammare di Stabia, Italy
- Launched: 16 February 2008
- Completed: September 2008
- In service: 2008–present
- Identification: Call sign: IBWP; IMO number: 9351488; MMSI number: 247243600
- Status: In service

General characteristics
- Type: Cruiseferry
- Tonnage: 63,742 GT
- Length: 254 m (833 ft 4 in)
- Beam: 30.4 m (99 ft 9 in)
- Draught: 7 m (23 ft 0 in)
- Installed power: 4 × Wärtsilä 12V46D; 55,440 kW (combined)
- Speed: 28 knots (52 km/h; 32 mph)
- Capacity: 3,500 passengers; 215 vehicles

Cruise Barcelona is a cruiseferry owned and operated by Grimaldi Lines. It was built at Fincantieri in Castellammare di Stabia, Italy.

She was the second of a series of four sister ships, the others being Cruise Roma (also operated by Grimaldi Lines), Cruise Europa and Cruise Olympia (operated by Minoan Lines). They are the largest ferries under Italian flag.

The ship can carry 3,500 passengers and about 215 cars.

Cruise Barcelona, together with sister Cruise Roma, is operated on the Civitavecchia-Porto Torres-Barcelona route, sailing twice a week in winter and five times per week in summer.

On 13–14 January 2012 Cruise Barcelona was involved in the rescue operation following the Costa Concordia disaster.

The ferry was lengthened to 254 metres (833 ft 4 in) in 2019.

In 2019, the vessel underwent an upgrade, incorporating a 5.5 MWh Orca ESS battery system from Corvus Energy. Contributes and estimated savings of about 1 million liters of diesel each year, resulting in reduce in CO_{2} emissions.
