= Conference hall =

Room for business events and meetings

A conference hall, conference room, or meeting room is a room provided for singular events such as business conferences and meetings.

== Room ==
It is commonly found at large hotels and convention centers though many other establishments, including even hospitals. Sometimes other rooms are modified for large conferences such as arenas or concert halls. Aircraft have been fitted out with conference rooms. Conference rooms can be windowless for security purposes. An example of one such room is in the Pentagon, known as the Tank.

Typically, the facility provides furniture, overhead projectors, stage lighting, and sound system.

Smoking is normally prohibited in conference halls, even when other parts of buildings permit smoking.

Sometimes the term 'conference hall' is used synonymously with 'conference center' as, for example, in 'Bandaranaike Memorial International Conference Hall'.

Some meeting rooms come equipped with booking management software, depending on the needs of the company that owns them.

Typically, a medium to large office or post-secondary educational facility has smaller meeting rooms, often called a conference room or a huddle room.

== Gallery ==
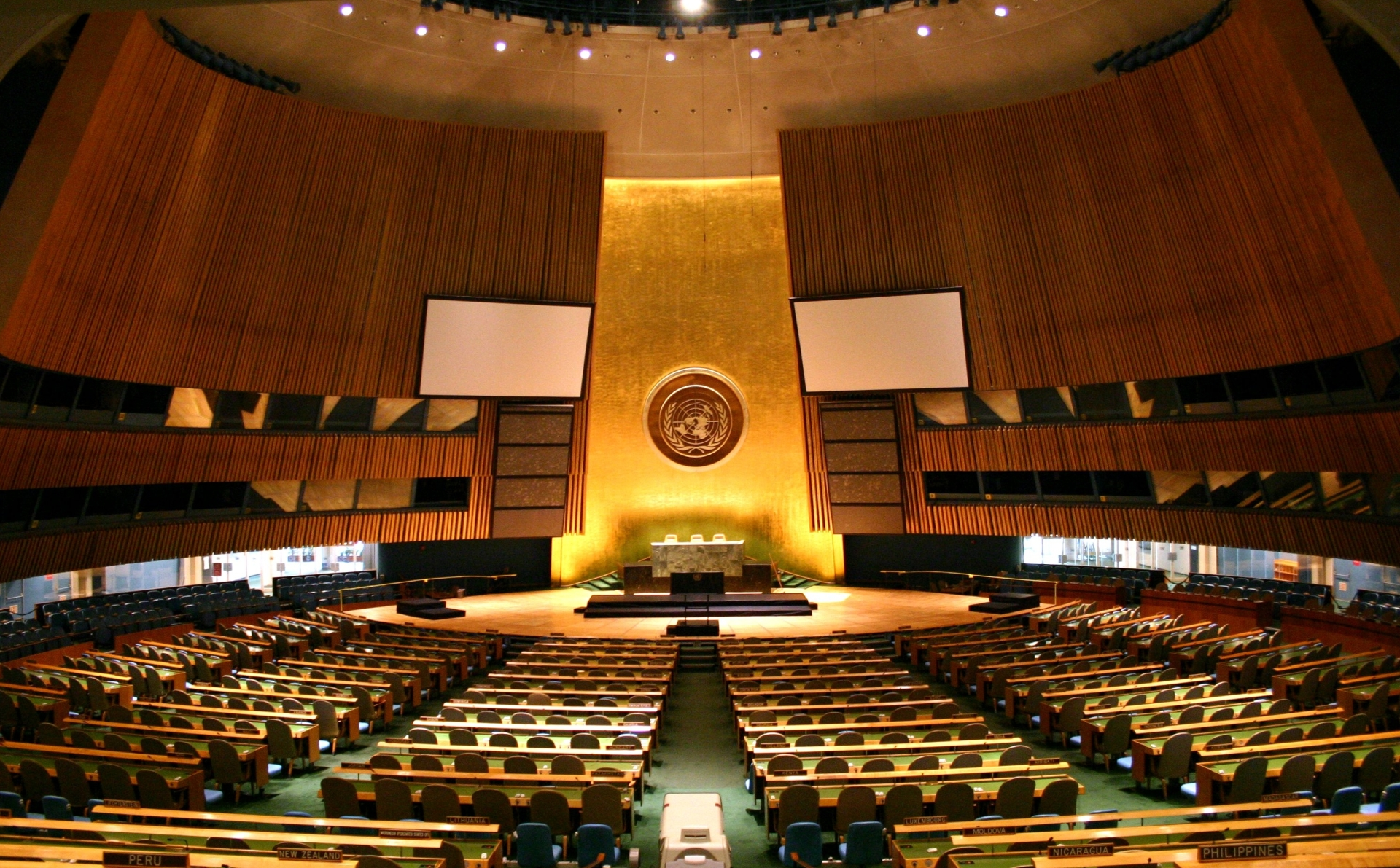
United Nations General Assembly Hall in New York City.

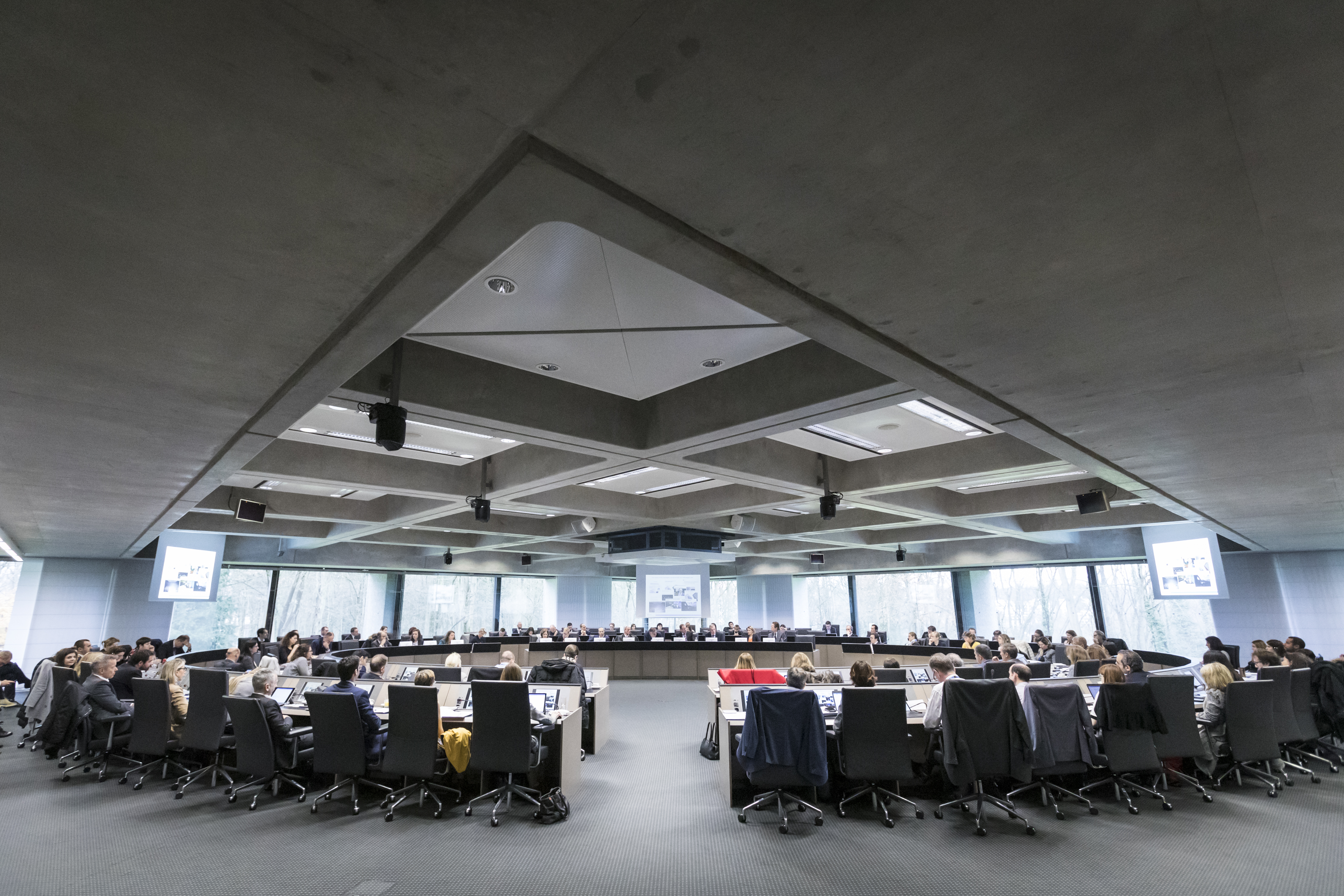
A large conference room with a two circular rows at the European Investment Bank headquarters in Luxembourg

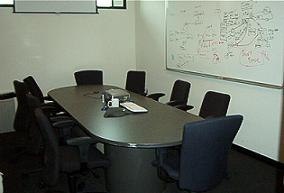
A small conference room in Playa Vista, Los Angeles in May 2006

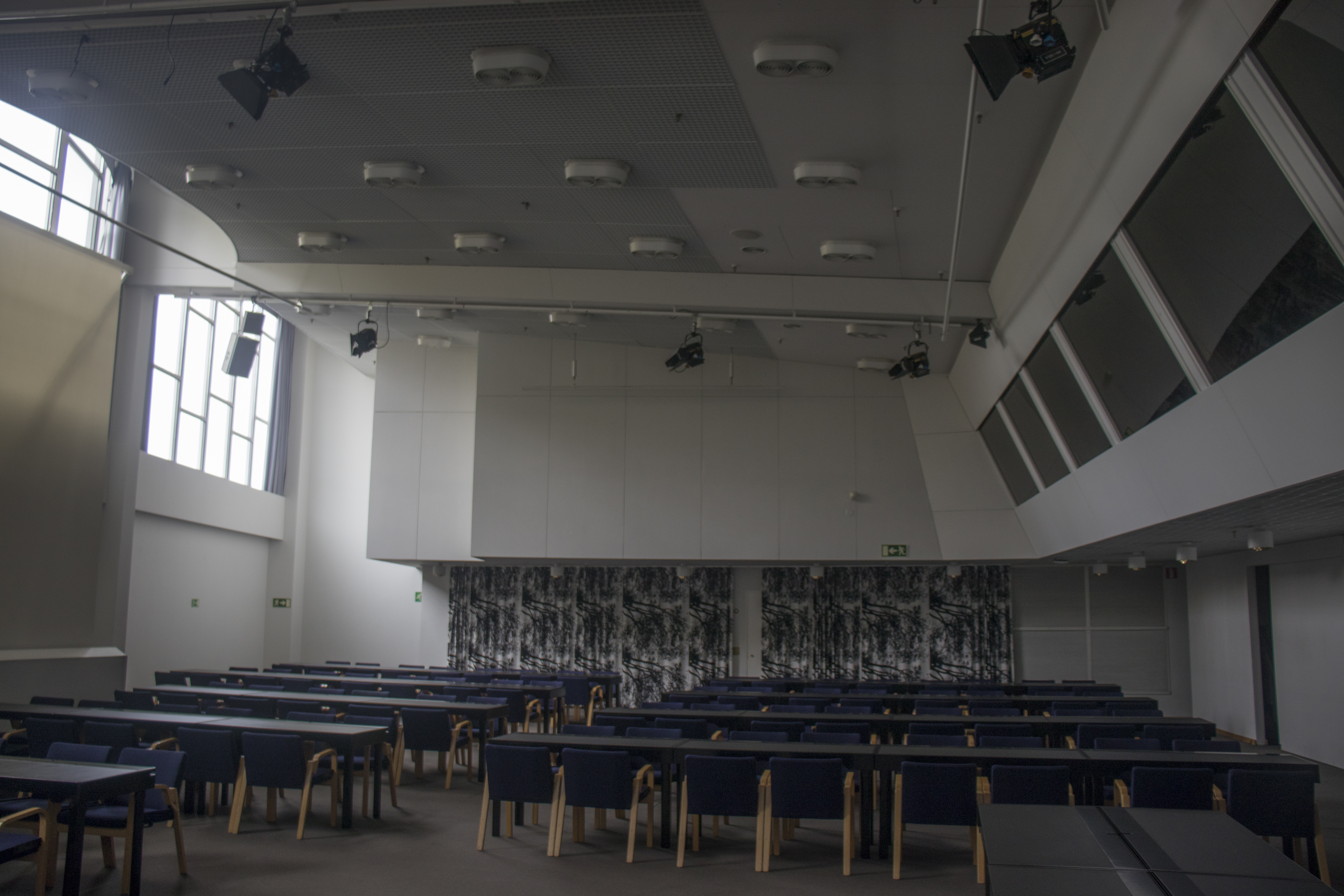
A medium size conference room of the Finlandia Hall in Helsinki.

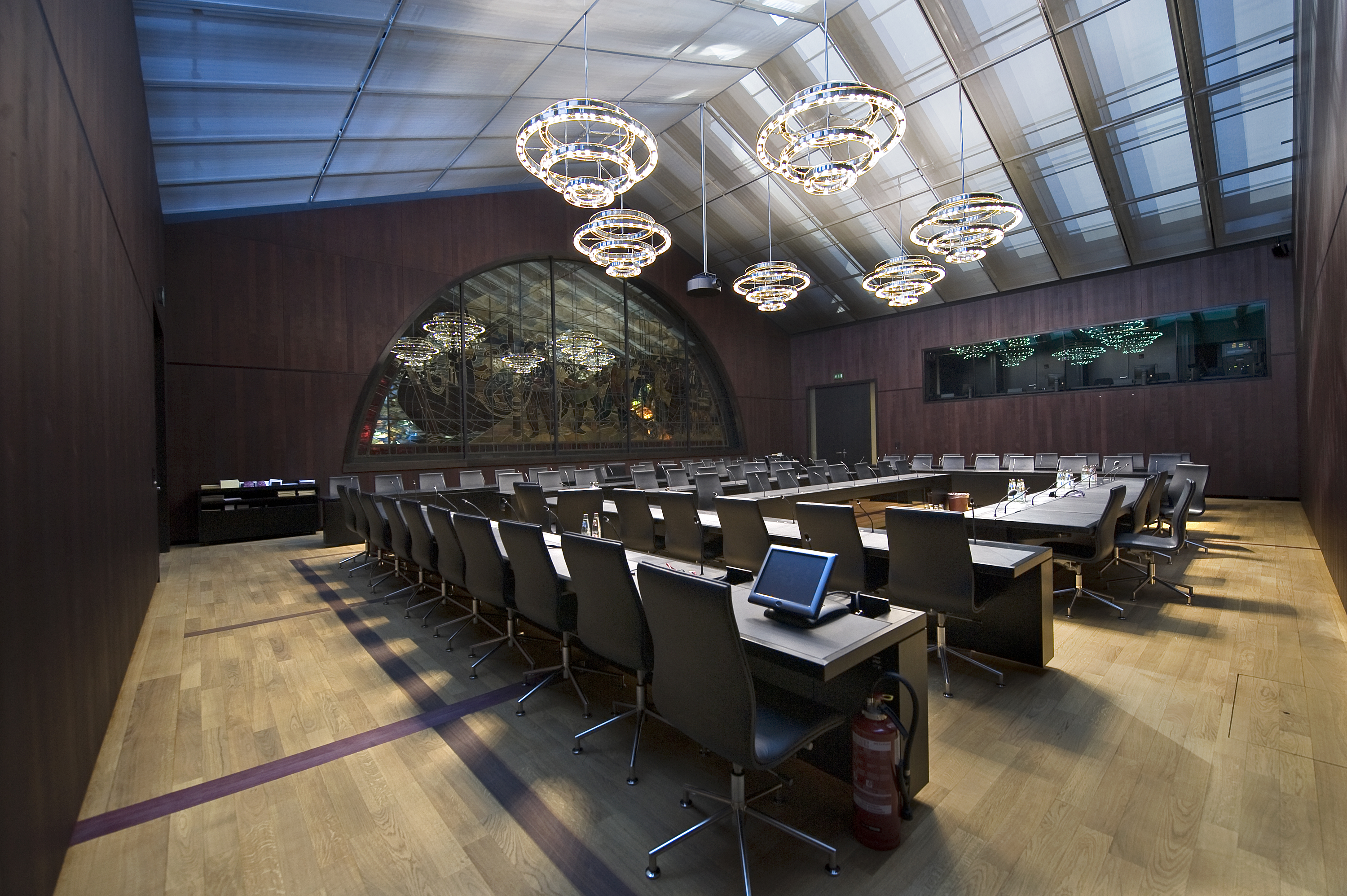
A meeting room in the Federal Palace of Switzerland in Bern.

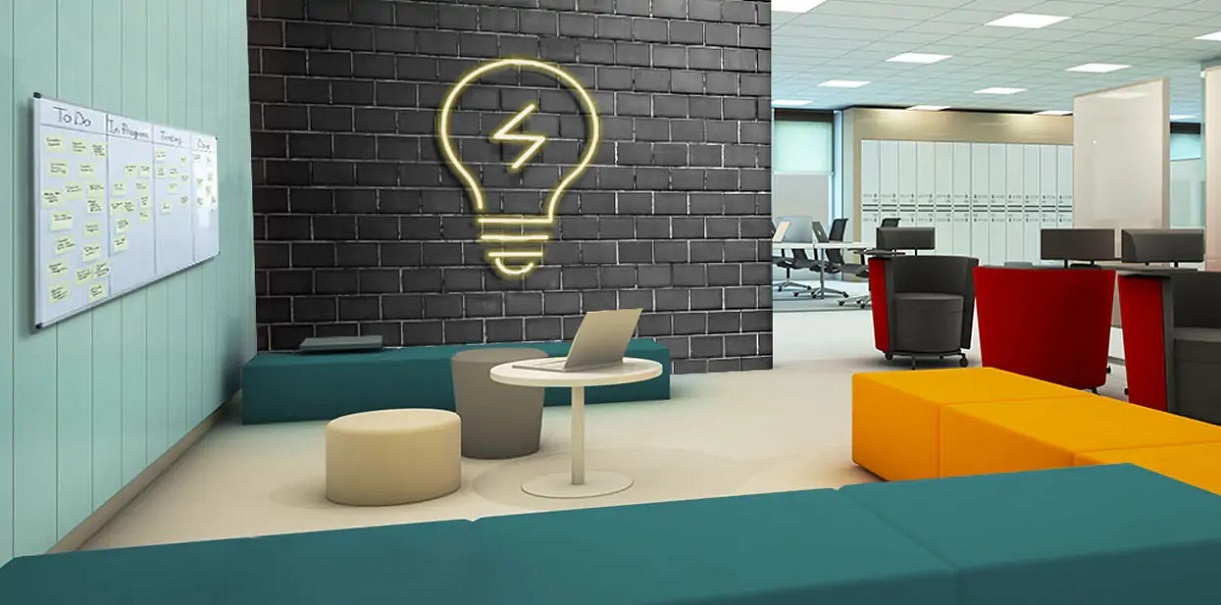
Modern meeting hall

== Possible setups ==
Meeting room layouts

Depending on the purpose of the meeting, conference rooms may be set up in various styles. Sometimes the furniture may even be moved easily before a meeting to accommodate the particular needs of each meeting. Commonly used styles include:

- Auditorium style
- Boardroom style (ideal for formal meetings, discussions, and presentations)
- Banquet style
- Hollow square style
- Classroom (each attendee have their own small desk space).
- Cinema (like classroom but without a desk)
- U-shape style
- Conference style

On the other hand, huddle rooms are small meeting rooms wherein participants can collaborate or have meetings in-person or remotely.

== See also ==
- Assembly hall
