= Méditerranée (ship) =

Ferry built in 1989

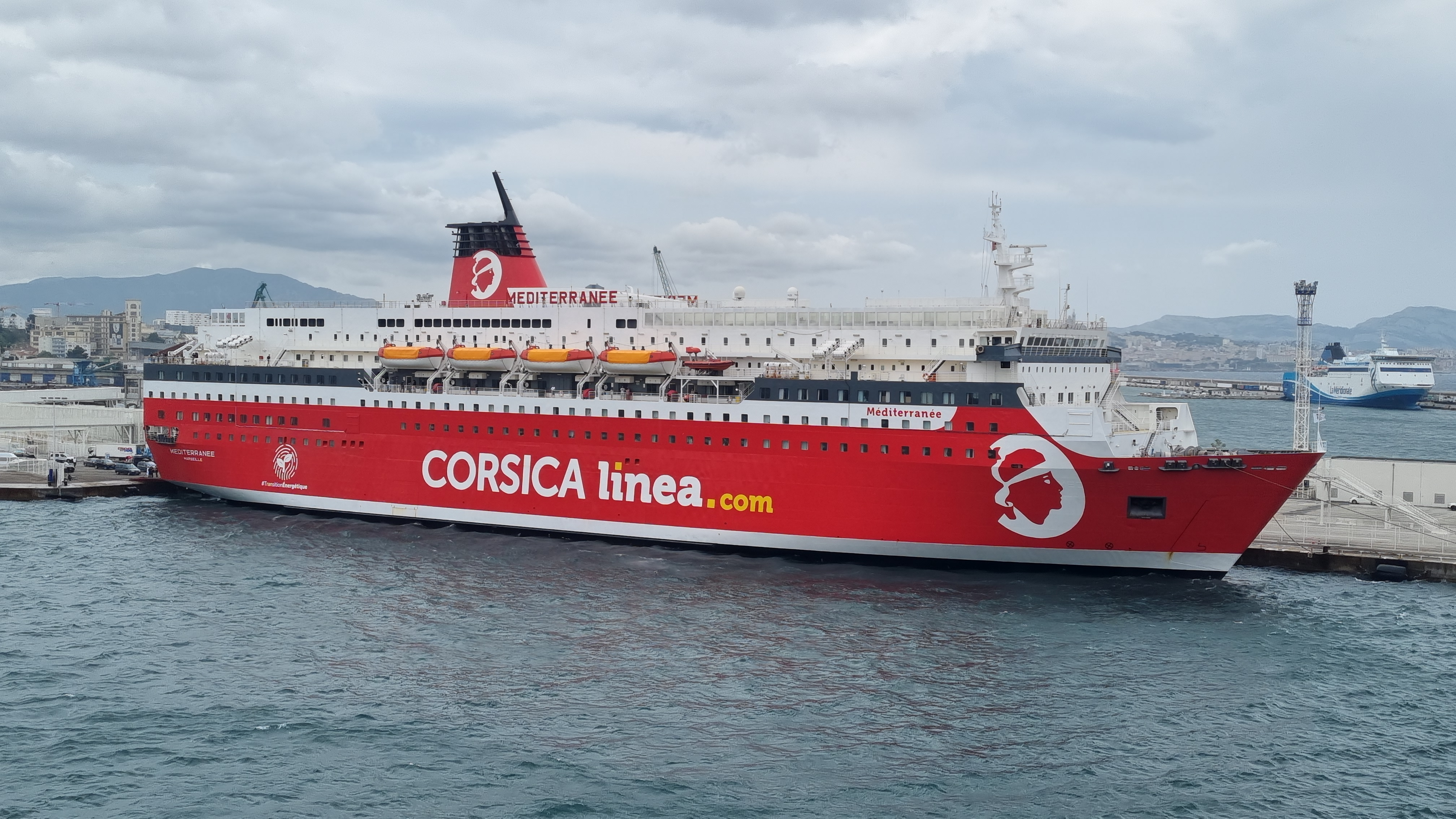
- Méditerranée in Marseille

History
- Name: (1989–2002): Danielle Casanova; (2002–present): Méditerranée
- Owner: (1989–2016): SNCM; (2016–2017): MCM (Maritima Ferries); (2017–present): Corsica Linea
- Operator: (1989–2016): SNCM; (2016): Maritima Ferries; (2016–present): Corsica Linea
- Port of registry: (1989–2002): Ajaccio, France; (2002–present): Marseille, France
- Route: Marseille – Algiers / Tunis; Former: Marseille – Ajaccio / Bastia
- Ordered: 15 April 1987
- Builder: Chantiers de l'Atlantique; Saint-Nazaire, France
- Yard number: C29
- Laid down: 29 December 1987
- Launched: 3 December 1988
- Completed: 9 May 1989
- Acquired: May 1989 (by SNCM) 2016 (by Corsica Linea)
- Maiden voyage: 17 May 1989
- In service: 1989
- Identification: IMO number: 8705395; Call sign: FNYF; MMSI number: 227187000
- Status: In service

General characteristics
- Class & type: Custom Cruise Ferry
- Tonnage: 30,985 GT; 3,452 DWT
- Displacement: 15,912 t
- Length: 165.54 m (543 ft 1 in)
- Beam: 27.40 m (89 ft 11 in)
- Height: 46.60 m (152 ft 11 in) (air draft)
- Draught: 6.40 m (21 ft 0 in)
- Decks: 12
- Ramps: Stern loading ramps
- Installed power: 4 × SEMT Pielstick 18PC2.6V400 marine diesel engines (total 35,768 kW / 47,965 hp)
- Propulsion: 2 × controllable pitch propellers
- Speed: 24.0 knots (44.4 km/h; 27.6 mph) (service)
- Capacity: 2,780 passengers (1,836 berths); 800 cars / 40 freight trailers
- Crew: 173 (15 officers + 158 crew)

Méditerranée is a ferry belonging to the French company Corsica Linea. Built by Chantiers de l'Atlantique for SNCM between 1987 and 1989, the ship was then named Danielle Casanova, after a Corsican communist activist and resistance fighter who died in deportation to Auschwitz in May 1943. It entered service in May 1989 operating on the routes ensuring territorial continuity between the mainland and Corsica, it was then the largest car ferry in the Mediterranean and the fastest in the world in its class. Replaced in 2002 by the new Danielle Casanova, it was renamed Méditerranée and assigned to routes between France, Tunisia, and Algeria. Transferred to Corsica Linea in 2016 following the liquidation of SNCM, it became a seasonal vessel, sailing only between June and September and laid up at the Marseille port breakwater for the rest of the year.

== History ==
=== Origins ===
Towards the end of the 1980s, SNCM began considering a replacement for the car ferry Provence. In its 1978 business plan, the company had already anticipated its retirement by 1985, especially since its operations had proven unprofitable at the end of the 1981 season. To succeed it, the SNCM teams then undertook the design of the "160-meter project," a large car ferry that would meet the summer demand on the Corsican routes, which were experiencing steady growth at that time. By the summer of 1982, the main specifications of this future ferry were finalized: a vessel over 160m long, with a gross tonnage of over 30,000, capable of cruising at over 24 knots and carrying just under 2,500 passengers and 800 vechiles on three car decks. This high capacity is made possible by the large hull volume, which would also allow for the creation of more comfortable accommodations.With the ship design finalized, SNCM now had to await approval from government authorities before placing its order. For this to be feasible, the average annual traffic growth had to be 4.5% between 1981 and 1985. Contrary to expectations, and despite initially favorable results, demand growth during the summer season slowed and even declined significantly from 1983 onwards due to a tense political situation in Corsica. As the situation did not allow for determining the need for an additional vessel in the short term, the commissioning of the "160 meter" ship by 1985 was jeopardized. The company nevertheless attempted twice to have the project approved on October 5, 1983 and May 23, 1984, but here too, the traffic trend will prove too weak to justify replacing the Provence with a new unit. During negotiations for the five-year renewal of the agreement between SNCM and the French State for service to Corsica, the authorities authorized the order of the "160 meter" vessel, provided that the amount of the subsidy was determined following negotiations between SNCM and the Corsican Regional Transport Authority (OTRC). Once the amount was approved, the OTRC endorsed the project, but pending the signing of the agreement, the commissioning of the new vessel, initially planned for 1988, was postponed by one year April 15, 1987, the order is officially placed with the Chantiers de l'Atlantique.

While the ship's technical specifications had been established as early as 1982, the interior layout underwent significant modifications. Initially, the facilities were closer to those of the Estérel and the Corse, notably featuring a 450-seat bar and lounge, a 500- seat veranda and brasserie, and a 250- seat cinema. However, a 1985 customer survey revealed that passenger expectations had evolved. The "sea train" concept, which had guided the design of the fleet's car ferries since 1976, now appeared outdated; passengers demanded greater comfort and higher-quality services. Also, due to the relatively short crossings, these communal areas needed to be functional and capable of accommodating both small numbers of passengers in winter and large crowds in summer. Thus, the design of the common areas has been completely revised and now includes a large self-service restaurant, a small restaurant, a large main lounge bar, a smaller luxury bar, large circulation areas, a cinema, and a shopping arcade. In total, an entire deck is dedicated to common areas. Regarding the facilities, the allocation will focus more on sleeper berths. Overnight capacity will be divided between 800 800 couchettes in cabins equipped with bathrooms and 1,050 second - class berths, supplemented by 600 Pullman seats.

The naming of the ship sparked a political debate. While the Corsican Assembly had proposed for the second time the name of the Corsican communist activist and resistance fighter Danielle Casanova, the Secretary of State for the Sea, Ambroise Guellec, announced on April 27, 1987 about ten days after the ship was ordered, it was decided that it would be christened Île de Beauté (Island of Beauty). Faced with the French government's refusal to grant the request from the Corsican authorities, a committee called "A Car Ferry Named Danielle Casanova" was formed at the initiative of former Member of Parliament Paul Cermolacce and gathered numerous signatures. It also brought the issue to the attention of President François Mitterrand, who was then in the midst of his 1988 presidential campaign. He responded favorably through his campaign manager, Pierre Bérégovoy. Thus, after François Mitterrand's re-election, the ship was officially named Danielle Casanova.

=== Construction ===
The ship was laid down in Saint-Nazaire on December 29, 1987 and launched in dry dock B on December 3, 1988. On March 25, 1989 it wastransferred to the Joubert dry dock for a final refit, after which it carries out its sea trials off Saint-Nazaire from the 4th to April 8. On this occasion, it broke the world speed record for a conventional ferry, reaching 26 knots. The Danielle Casanova was delivered to SNCM on May 9 and succeeded the Napoléon as flagship. This ship also brought a host of new features. Externally, it was characterized by a turquoise blue stripe along the portholes on deck 6, foreshadowing the new "SNCM Ferryterranée" livery that would be applied to the rest of the fleet the following year. It also introduced a new boarding system using a card for each passenger, containing all the information concerning the journey and, in particular, for cabin occupants, a confidential code to access their reserved area. Each cabin was now equipped with electronic locks that unlocked using a keypad. This system would later be installed on the rest of the fleet. Its arrival also marked the end of the separation of facilities between first and second class in favor of a single class, with cabins now categorized according to the level of service. Finally, it is the first SNCM ship to be registered in a Corsican port, in this case, Ajaccio,and not Marseille.

=== Service ===
==== SNCM (1989-2016) ====
On May 10, 1989 the Danielle Casanova departs Saint-Nazaire at 8:05 AM for Marseille. After a voyage at an average speed of 24 knots, the ship arrives for the first time in the Phocaean city on May 13 and docked at 10:17 a.m. at berth 82. In the following days, it was officially presented to the authorities and the public, respectively on the 15th and May 16. On May 17 under the command of Captain Pellicot, the Danielle Casanova set sail at 8:30 p.m. for its maiden voyage to Ajaccio, carrying 620 guests. The following day, the ship arrived for the first time in its home port, where the christening ceremony began at 10:00 a.m., attended by, among others, the Minister of the Sea, Jacques Mellick, Claude Abraham, Chairman of SNCM, and the Chairman of Chantiers de l'Atlantique. The ship's godmother was Homère Philippi, Danielle Casanova 's older sister. Following the ceremony, the ship set sail at noon, with 1,500 people on board, for a sea trip between Ajaccio and Bastia, arriving at 7am cruising along the Calanques of Piana. The Danielle Casanova then began her commercial career in the service of territorial continuity between Corsica and the mainland, mainly from Marseille or Toulon to Ajaccio and Bastia.

From November 27 to December 1, 1989 during its first technical stop, the propeller blades were replaced to reduce a vibration problem felt on the aft deck 7. The "SNCM Ferryterranée" trademark was also painted on the ship's hull, which was originally blank. A few weeks later, between the 26th and December 28, the Danielle Casanova transported the 1,300 people of the 1990 Dakar Rally caravan to Tripoli and shared with the Estérel the transport of vehicles and helicopters.

On March 16, 1991 from midnight, the ship was chartered by the French government to repatriate French military personnel from Saudi Arabia as part of Operation Daguet. Thus, after completing the crossing between Marseille and Ajaccio, the Danielle Casanova left Corsica at 7:18 am bound for Yanbu. After covering 1,821 miles at an average speed of 24 knots, the car ferry reached Saudi Arabia on March 20 at 3 PM. A force of 1,270 military personnel and 176 vechiles boarded in the evening, and the ship left Yanbu the following day at 10:10 AM. After making the return journey, the Danielle Casanova arrived in Toulon on March 27 at 6:45 a.m. under full flags, greeted by a fireboat. The ship will subsequently make a second voyage in the same setting between the 2nd and April 14.

Starting with the summer of 1993, SNCM recruited female hotel staff for the first time on board its ships. It was in this context that, at the end of June, twelve young women embarked on the Danielle Casanova, all recruited as registered seafarers on the same basis as the men. Due to the requirement to provide them with separate cabins and bathrooms, they were housed at the front of deck 9 under the navigation bridge. At the end of the season, the experiment proved a success; the female teams had quickly integrated well into both the crew and the passengers, so much so that the initiative was repeated the following season on the Île de Beauté, then the Monte d'Oro and the Paglia Orba, and finally on the rest of the fleet, with the notable exception of the Liberté.

On July 8, 2000, while the ship was crossing from Bastia to Marseille, the officer on watch received a distress call from a sailboat in trouble. Being nearby, the Danielle Casanova diverted to assist the sailboat's six passengers. Due to poor weather conditions, the crew was unable to bring the six people aboard using a ladder. The sailboat's occupants were therefore winched aboard by a helicopter from the Hyères Naval Air Base and then transferred to the car ferry. A few months later, on November 27 also between Bastia and Marseille in rough seas and westerly winds, the crew spotted a small white distress light at around 2:20 a.m. Five minutes later, the ship was diverted by CrossMed, which informed them that a search operation was underway to find a drifting inflatable boat with two occupants on board. The boat was found about twenty minutes later, and the two occupants were transferred aboard the Danielle Casanova.

In the early 2000s, SNCM considered renewing its aging fleet operating on routes between France, Algeria, and Tunisia. Following a meeting between the company and various stakeholders, organized by the Minister of Transport, Jean-Claude Gayssot, it was decided that the Danielle Casanova would replace the Napoléon on international routes, while a new or used vessel would take over on the Corsican routes. Assigning the Danielle Casanova to this network would significantly improve service, thanks in particular to its large cargo capacity and comfortable accommodations. The increased capacity would also effectively support the resumption of traffic with Algeria after a period of political tension. Its speed would also allow for intensive use during the summer months, without the risk of canceling a sailing due to delays. The announcement of the ship's transfer to routes to North Africa, however, provoked an outcry from various Corsican and resistance associations who were keen to ensure that Danielle Casanova 's name remained associated with Corsica. Consequently, the management of SNCM decided to swap the names of the old and new ships, which were initially to be named Méditerranée.

In anticipation of its future assignment to the Maghreb routes, the Danielle Casanova will undergo various modifications during its technical refit carried out from February 26 to March 26, 2002. Among other works, the decor of the bar-lounge and the brasserie is being modified, and the shopping arcade is being redesigned, notably with the addition of a duty-free shop. These works will continue even beyond the scheduled maintenance shutdown, until June. On March 7, 2002 the ship officially becomes the Méditerranée and is registered in Marseille. On March 28 the ship left Marseille at 8:38 PM for his first commercial voyage under his new name, bound for Propriano. A month later, on April 29 during a crossing between Marseille and Bastia, a fire was spotted around 2:15 a.m. on car deck number 3, amidships on the port side. Starting in a camper van, the fire then spread dangerously to other vehicles. The crew, however, managed to bring the blaze under control in less than thirty minutes, and the ship did not delay its arrival. While the ship itself sustained no significant damage, three vehicles were destroyed and twenty-one others were slightly damaged. After receiving approval from the authorities, the Méditerranée was able to set sail that same evening. With authorization from Bureau Veritas, repairs could be carried out while the ship was in operation. The damage affected the section of the removable car deck located above the fire, the bulkheads and ceiling,as well as the paintwork in the affected area. Finally, a few days later, on May 5, the Méditerranée was unofficially christened by the crew during a stopover in Porto Torres.The ship's new godmother was a ship's officer, Lieutenant Muriel Teissier. On June 24 at 11:30 a.m.,the ship departs Marseille for its maiden voyage to Tunis, as part of its new assignment to the Maghreb routes. Primarily serving Tunisia during the summer season, it also makes occasional trips to Corsica. During the off-season, it serves both Tunisia and Algeria simultaneously, albeit with reduced frequency.

At the beginning of the month of January in 2003, the Méditerranée was chartered to transport the 2003 Dakar Rally caravan between Spain and Tunisia. For this purpose, 1,138 passengers and 460 vehicles embarked on January 3 to Valencia. The ship then sets sail for Tunis, which is reached the following day.

In 2004, during its technical refit, the Méditerranée was repainted in the new SNCM colors. The "Ferryterranée" trademark disappeared from its sides, replaced by the single "SNCM" inscription, which was moved to the bow. The company's website address was added in red towards the stern, and the turquoise blue band bordering the portholes on deck 6 was replaced by a darker blue band painted along deck 7. The technical refit ended on June 9, and the ship subsequently resumes its rotations towards the Maghreb.

During the summer season of 2010, as part of a partnership established between SNCM and Olympique de Marseille, the ship displayed a promotional livery on its sides with "SNCM transports OM" written on the port side and "OM travels with SNCM" on the starboard side.

From 2011 onwards, the Maghreb countries experienced significant upheaval in the context of the Arab Spring. These events led to a substantial decrease in traffic on routes to Algiers and Tunis, inevitably resulting in a reduction in sailings. Consequently, the fleet dedicated to North African routes was partially redeployed to Corsica during the summer. Thus, during the 2011 and 2012 summer seasons, the Méditerranée operated additional crossings to Porto-Vecchio every Friday.

In 2013, SNCM decided to replace the Méditerranée with the car ferry El. Venizelos, chartered to replace the Île de Beauté in the fleet, on the Maghreb routes. The company thus announced the transfer of the Méditerranée to the Corsican routes and its year-round assignment to the three-times-weekly service between Toulon and Bastia. To this end, it made a stopover in the afternoon of January 8 to the port of Toulon for testing of its stern doors at the berth allocated to SNCM vessels. The ship then begins its regular service from the Var capital starting from May 13. During the summer season, he also makes a few trips to Nice.

From the 18th to April 20, 2014, the car ferry transports Toulon Rugby Club supporters to Barcelona for a rugby match between their club and USAP Perpignan. At the beginning of the 2014 summer season, the ship's operations were temporarily disrupted due to a strike by SNCM sailors. Once the strike ended and work resumed, on July 10 the Méditerranée resumed its crossings between Toulon and Bastia and also provided a new service between Toulon and Porto-Vecchio every Friday, as well as some sailings to Tunisia and Algeria. At the end of the season, SNCM was facing significant difficulties. The shipowner's very worrying situation led to the interruption of the three-times-a-week service provided by the Méditerranée. Thus,on October 12, t19h 20' ship departed Bastia at 7:20 p.m. and left Corsica for the last time under the SNCM flag. Initially laid up in Marseille, it was reassigned to the Maghreb routes from January 2015, replacing the Danielle Casanova, which was decommissioned for economic reasons. During the summer, for its last season on behalf of SNCM, the ship mainly served Algeria.

Corsica Linea (since 2016)

On January 5, 2016, the Méditerranée was transferred to Maritime Corse Méditerranée (MCM), a new entity succeeding SNCM following its acquisition by Patrick Rocca. After its technical stop in Marseille, the ship emerged from dry dock, devoid of any commercial markings. Initially, the car ferry, like the other ships in the fleet, was intended to display the colors of the Maritima Ferries brand. However, this brand was never launched, as in April, MCM was sold by the Rocca group to the Corsica Maritima consortium. The fleet was thus transferred to a new commercial entity called Corsica Linea. Despite the change of ownership, the ship retained its service between France and North Africa.

On May 19, between Algiers and Marseille, the Méditerranée was diverted by CrossMed to assist two pleasure boaters in distress. The following day, on May 20, the ship is making an exceptional crossing between Marseille and Porto-Vecchio, replacing the Paglia Orba, which itself is replacing the Pascal Paoli, which is out of service for repainting in Corsica Linea colors before the start of the season. The Méditerranée, meanwhile, is being repainted in the company's colors on May 28, but nevertheless retains its original white livery where the other ships have their hulls repainted red. Only its blue stripe bordering deck 7 is repainted gray. While a major overhaul of the ship was initially announced at the time of the company's takeover, including the refurbishment of the common areas during the winter of 2017-2018 and the cabins the following winter, Corsica Linea will nevertheless hint in July 2017, that these works were no longer on the agenda and that the Méditerranée could, in the short term, leave the fleet.Despite this, the ship was renewed for the 2018 summer season on the routes between Marseille, Algiers and Tunis. At the end of this season, the company announced that the car ferry would continue to sail under its colors in 2019 after its usual winter lay-up.

On June 21, 2019, following the blockade of the port of Marseille and several Corsica Linea ships by striking sailors from La Méridionale, the Méditerranée was urgently chartered to transport passengers bound for Corsica and made a voyage between Toulon and Ajaccio. The arrival the next day in the imperial city was somewhat tense due to the presence of strikers, but no action was taken against the ship, which set sail that evening for Marseille. It subsequently began its season on the Algiers route on June 23.

During the night of September 1st to 2nd, while crossing from Algiers to Marseille, the Méditerranée came to the aid of 18 North African migrants adrift on a broken-down motorboat. Taken aboard the car ferry, the migrants were examined by the ship's doctor. The vessel then sailed to the port of Alcúdia on the island of Majorca, where the shipwrecked migrants were disembarked around 11:00 AM, before resuming its journey to Marseille.

From the 14th to November 16, its garage hosted part of the founding event of the Extraordinary Factory. On this occasion, the Méditerranée docked at the J4 esplanade quay. Following this event, the car ferry was put back into service to provide regular winter service to Algeria and Tunisia, replacing the Danielle Casanova, which had been partially redeployed to Corsica to compensate for the successive unavailability of the mixed-use vessels due to their maintenance stops. However, it found itself stranded in the port of Marseille on January 11, 2020, during the strike by the La Méridionale sailors' unions, causing the cancellation of several crossings to Algiers and Tunis.At the end of the industrial dispute, the rotations that it was to make in February were cancelled and the ship was laid up.

While it was scheduled to resume its usual summer service to Algiers at the end of June, the ship found itself without a mission due to the temporary closure of Algerian borders caused by the COVID-19 pandemic. It was then used at the beginning of July to transport rental vehicles to Corsica to address a shortage. The Méditerranée made several stops in Bastia and Ajaccio between the 5th and 9th of July, as well as a stopover in Barcelona on June 7. It then replaced, from July 10, the Danielle Casanova, temporarily immobilized due to the presence of sailors infected with COVID-19, between Marseille and Tunisia. On July 14 however, eight cases were reported among the crew, leading to the ship being immobilized upon its return from Tunis. On August 12, it temporarily resumed service and made seven round trips between Marseille and L'Île-Rousse as a replacement for the Monte d'Oro, which was immobilized following a breakdown.

At the end of the month of March 2022, at the initiative of Corsica Linea, the Méditerranée was made available to the Bouches-du-Rhône prefecture to serve as a floating reception center for Ukrainian nationals fleeing their country in the context of the Russo-Ukrainian War. For this purpose, the ship was moved to the J1 pier in La Joliette on March 25 and welcomes its first residents on March 29. On this occasion, the car ferry, laid up for over a year and a half, was refurbished, the signage was partially translated into Ukrainian, the Salambo bar was transformed into a daycare center, and the cinema was even renovated after 20 years of closure. On board, various services were set up to facilitate the integration of these refugees, such as a Pôle Emploi (French public employment service) agency, a Crédit Agricole bank branch, and a Red Cross medical team including a psychological support unit. With a capacity of 830 people, it was at that time the largest reception center for Ukrainian populations. This operation, providing accommodation for up to 930 people, including meals and support, cost 6 million euros for seventy-three days of operation. The ship continued to perform this function until June 20, before being returned to Corsica Linea for the summer season. A few days later, on June 17, the Méditerranée resumes its seasonal crossings to Algeria, marking the ship's return to this route after a two-year absence in the context of the COVID-19 pandemic.

On March 29, 2023, the Méditerranée left the Marseille port breakwater, where it had been wintering, to sail to Tunisia for its technical refit at the CMRT shipyards in Bizerte. As part of the strategy to develop connections with North Africa, significant modernization work was carried out on board, including the refurbishment of the bar, lounge seating, and restrooms, the addition of a children's playroom, and the sandblasting of the hull. However, the most notable change was the repainting of the ship, which abandoned its original white hull and adopted the red livery of Corsica Linea, like the rest of the fleet. The work lasted approximately two months, after which the ship departed Tunisia on June 3, and arrived in Marseille adorned with its new colors and displaying its flag in the morning of June 5. He subsequently began his season in Algiers on June 20 and arrived for the first time in the Algerian capital in its new guise the following day. During the summer, as part of its ambition to operate a less polluting fleet, Corsica Linea tested an alternative fuel made from recycled cooking oils on board the ship. Used at a rate of 30% and blended with fuel oil, this biofuel allowed the company to reduce the car ferry's emissions by 20 to 25%.

During another, much more substantial, technical stop, also carried out at the CMRT construction sites in Bizerte between November 17, 2024 and May 4, 2025, the Méditerranée underwent a major technical overhaul, including the replacement of its generators and two boilers with more modern models. The ship's old generators were transferred to the ENSM in Marseille and the maritime high school in Bastia for use in student training.

== Facilities ==
The Méditerranée has 12 decks. Passenger quarters extend over all of decks 6, 7 and 8 as well as part of decks 9, 5 and 2. Crew quarters occupy decks 9 and 10. Decks 3, 4 and 5 are used as garages while the lower decks house, among other things, the propulsion system.

=== Common areas ===
Designed to be more comfortable than its predecessors, the Danielle Casanova offered high-quality facilities upon its entry into service, equally pleasant for overnight crossings and practical for daytime voyages. Located primarily on deck 8, these facilities included two bars, a restaurant, a self-service restaurant, a snack bar, and a shopping arcade. A cinema was also located on deck 9, and a sheltered solarium was situated on deck 11.

When the ship became the Méditerranée in 2002, the layout of the premises was not modified but several changes, including the names and decoration, were undertaken with a view to assigning the ship to the Maghreb routes.

Since 2002, the ship's points of sale have been named as follows:

- The Sirocco: The main bar located at the bow of the ship, entertainment is offered there depending on the crossings;
- The Salambo: The ship's second bar, also located at the bow. A little more refined than the Sirocco. Unused by the company for several years, it was transformed into a children's playroom in 2023;
- La Madrague: The ship's restaurant located at the stern on the starboard side.
- The Sand Rose: The ship's self-service restaurant located at the stern on the port side.
- The Oasis: Fast food area located in the middle of the ship on the starboard side.

In addition to these facilities, the Méditerranée has a shopping arcade amidships on the starboard side that can be used as a duty-free shop on the Maghreb routes, as well as a children's play area near the bar. On the Maghreb routes, a prayer room is set up in one of the ship's lounges on deck 6.

The ship's cinema has been closed to the public for several years and the solarium, although still accessible, is very rarely used.

=== Cabins ===
The Méditerranée has 543 cabins divided between categories A and C. The category A facilities are mostly located on deck 7 and consist of 111 four-berth outside cabins and 160 two-berth inside cabins. Eight two-berth cabins and six four-berth cabins are located on deck 9 on the starboard aft level. All category A cabins are equipped with bathrooms.

Category C cabins are located primarily on Deck 6 and at the rear of Deck 5. They consist of 82 outside cabins and 132 inside cabins. All are equipped with four berths and a washbasin. An additional 44 Category C cabins are located at the front of Deck 2, below the car decks. Finally, these cabins are complemented by two lounges with seating located at the rear of Deck 6, offering a total of 600 seats.

== Features ==
The Méditerranée is 165 meters long and 27.40 meters wide, with a gross tonnage of 30,985 GT, making it the largest car ferry sailing the Mediterranean when it entered service. The ship can carry 2,780 passengers and has a garage with space for 800 vechiles spread over three levels, accessible via two stern ramps, each 5.80 meters wide and 5 meters high, and a bow ramp, also 5.80 meters wide and 5 meters high. It is fully air-conditioned. Propulsion is provided by four Pielstick 18PC2/6V400 18-cylinder V-engines, developing a capacity of 35,768 kW, driving two four-bladed, variable-pitch propellers, allowing the vessel to reach speeds of over 24 knots, making it the fastest car ferry in its class in the world at the time. It is also equipped with two 1,100 kW bow thrusters and a ACH twin-fin roll stabilizer. The vessel carries eight medium-sized enclosed lifeboats, one small rescue boat, and one rigid inflatable boat, as well as numerous inflatable life rafts. It is also the first car ferry in the fleet to offer slide evacuation and enclosed lifeboats.

== Routes served ==
From 1989 to 2002, the Méditerranée, then named Danielle Casanova, operated services from the ports of Marseille, Toulon, and occasionally Nice to Bastia, Ajaccio, and Propriano. It also served Sardinia from Marseille or Toulon to Porto Torres, often via Propriano or Ajaccio. In the 1990s, the ship sometimes sailed on the Genoa -Bastia route operated by the Corsica Marittima subsidiary.

In 2002, the ship was renamed Méditerranée and assigned to the Maghreb routes departing from Marseille, primarily to Tunis and secondarily to Algiers. It made a few crossings to Corsica during the high season. During the summers of 2011 and 2012, it operated a crossing every Friday evening between Marseille and Porto-Vecchio.

In 2013, the ship was redeployed to the Corsican route between Toulon and Bastia, offering overnight crossings. During the summer, it also served the route from Nice with daytime crossings. From the summer of 2014, the car ferry inaugurated a new route between Toulon and Porto Vecchio and also made occasional crossings to Tunis and Béjaïa. Its Nice crossings were discontinued. In 2015, the Méditerranée was once again assigned to the Maghreb routes from Marseille, primarily to Algiers and occasionally to Tunis.

From 2016, the ship was transferred to Corsica Linea but retained its seasonal assignment between Marseille, Algiers, and Tunis. During the 2017 season, it occasionally served Béjaïa. From the 2019 season onward, it was exclusively dedicated to the Marseille-Algiers route. At the end of November, due to the Danielle Casanova being used on the Corsican network, the Méditerranée exceptionally sailed during the low season and replaced it on the Maghreb routes until January 2020.
