= Paradis Latin =

Theatre in Paris, France

Coordinates: 48°50′53″N 2°21′11″E

- the oldest cabaret in Paris
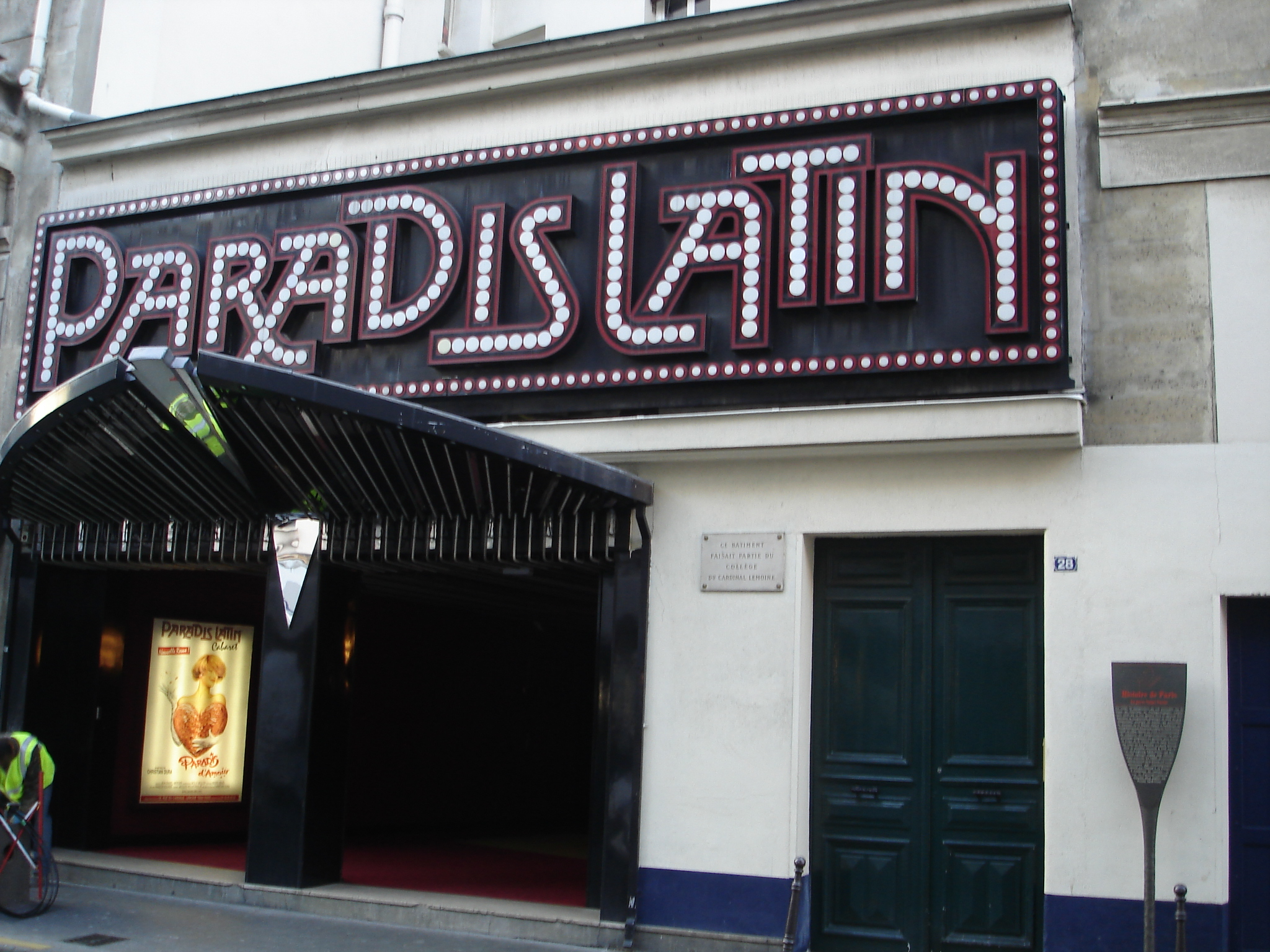
- Interactive map of Paradis Latin
- Location: 28 rue du Cardinal Lemoine, Paris

Website
- paradislatin.com

- atelierbig.jpg
- backstage
- backstage
- dressing room
- Show
- Solo Final

The Paradis Latin is a theater at number 28, rue du Cardinal Lemoine, in the Latin Quarter of Paris, in the fifth arrondissement, near Notre-Dame, the Panthéon, and the Tour d'Argent restaurant. The closest métro stations are Cardinal Lemoine and Jussieu.

It was first built on the rue des Fosses-Saint-Victor in 1803 and called Théâtre Latin. It burned down in 1870, but was rebuilt on the rue du Cardinal Lemoine, as Paradis Latin in 1887–1889 by Gustave Eiffel. It was closed around 1900, but was rehabilitated, starting in 1973, and reopened, in 1977, as a cabaret. It is currently owned by businessman Walter Butler.

== History ==
Paradis Latin goes back to 1802, when the First Consul Napoleon Bonaparte built the Latin Theater, on the rue des Fossés-Saint-Victor, and opened in 1803. In 1830, the Latin Theater became one of the highlights of the Parisian nights where artists, bourgeois, writers, poets, journalists, politicians, intellectuals, students, workers, merchants, and aristocrats met. Famous regulars included Honoré de Balzac, Alexandre Dumas, Alexandre Dumas fils and Prosper Mérimée.

It was destroyed by a fire during the Franco-Prussian War of 1870, when Prussian Chancellor Otto von Bismarck besieged Paris. Its ruins remained for 17 years.

In 1887, during the preparation of the Paris Exhibition of 1889, Gustave Eiffel reconstructed the theater at the same time as his tower. The new hall was inaugurated on Sunday, January 20, 1889, under the name of Paradis Latin and started presenting nightly revues and ballets. The same year the Paradis Latin put on a production of the Mandrake, starring singer Yvette Guilbert, who would later become the interpreter of the composer Léon Xanrof.

As a direct competitor to Paradis Latin, cafés-concerts, more numerous than ever, all gave the same stereotyped spectacle. There was a beginning of the songs which invariably produced in front of the public, the comic-troupier, the poivrot, the gummeuse, the peasant comic, the patriotic singer. The directors of Paradis Latin then had the idea to call on acrobats, balancers, jugglers, contortionists, Chinese shadow-makers to complete and enrich their show. The new formula held only a few seasons.

In 1894, the great hall of the Paradis Latin closed its doors. Only the brasserie, starring Chopinette, a pupil of Bruant but with neither talent nor authority, and his clientele, largely made of students, did not allow him to survive beyond 1903. The immense location became a warehouse.

At the beginning of the 20th century, Montmartre is now the fashionable district of Paris. The Paradis Latin suffers from this displacement and becomes an industrial area with glassmakers and faience potters who settle there. The glass-maker Charles Leune bought the Paradis Latin to install his workshop there. In 1930 a pharmaceutical company acquired it but left the place unoccupied.

In 1973, the real estate developer Jean Kriegel bought the building to renovate the old building into apartments. Visiting the premises, he reportedly found eighteen thousand pipettes and other stills litter the ground, abandoned by its last owner. Renovations revealed the metal structure installed by Eiffel, fragments of theatre props and scenery, and a Paradis Latin poster. When workers uncover an astonishing cathedral, gilt, columns, arches, capitals and a painted cupola on the first floor, the real estate developers change their appartment plans to instead reconstruct the 720-seat cabaret according to Eiffel's original plans.

Jean-Marie Rivière, artistic director, assisted by the author Frédéric Botton, presented the first Paris Paradis show on November 14, 1977. In 1979, Jean-Jacques Debout and Roger Dumas created the Nuit de Paradis show for Jean-Marie Rivière. In 1981 a new show, Paradisiac, was produced and directed by Frédéric Botton and Francis Lai, who took a leave from his musical and film career for the project.

Thierry Paulin, Jean-Thierry Mathurin, and the artist Michel Berger got their start at the theater. Arturo Brachetti, now considered the best quick change performer in the world, started his career at Paradis Latin in 1979. He was the only one in the world since the legendary Leopoldo Fregoli (1867-1937).

The artistic director, Jean-Marie Rivière, eventually retired to the Antilles, but the theater continued. New shows followed, co-written and directed by Christian Dura: Champagne in 1984, then Hello Paradis in 1987, and Viva Paradis, which commemorates the hundredth anniversary of the theater. In May 1995, a few years after the departure of his former colleague Rivière, Jean Kriegel chose to retire as well. Over nearly twenty years, he had hosted some two million spectators, with six different shows and over 1600 performances. In 1995, the management was transferred to Sidney Israel and his son Harold.

Since 2018, the cabaret is owned by French-American businessman Walter Butler.

In 2019, Iris Mittenaere, Miss Universe 2016, is the celebrity star of Kamel Ouali's new revue at Paradis Latin.

Paradis Latin offers Can-Can lessons at their Atelier Can-Can.

== Revues ==
- 1977: Paris Paradis by Jean-Marie Rivière
- 1979: Nuit de Paradis by Jean-Marie Rivière
- 1981: Paradisiac by Francis Morane, Jean Kriegel
- 1984: Champagne by Christian Dura, Jean Kriegel
- 1987: Hello Paradis by Christian Dura, Jean Kriegel
- 1990: Viva Paradis by Philippe Rondest
- 2001: Paradis d'Amour by Christian Dura
- 2008: Paradis à la folie by Christian Dura
- 2012: Atelier French Cancan
- 2019-present: L'Oiseau Paradis by Kamel Ouali
- 2022-present: Mon Premier Cabaret by Kamel Ouali (a cabaret show for a family audience)

== Gallery ==
Venue

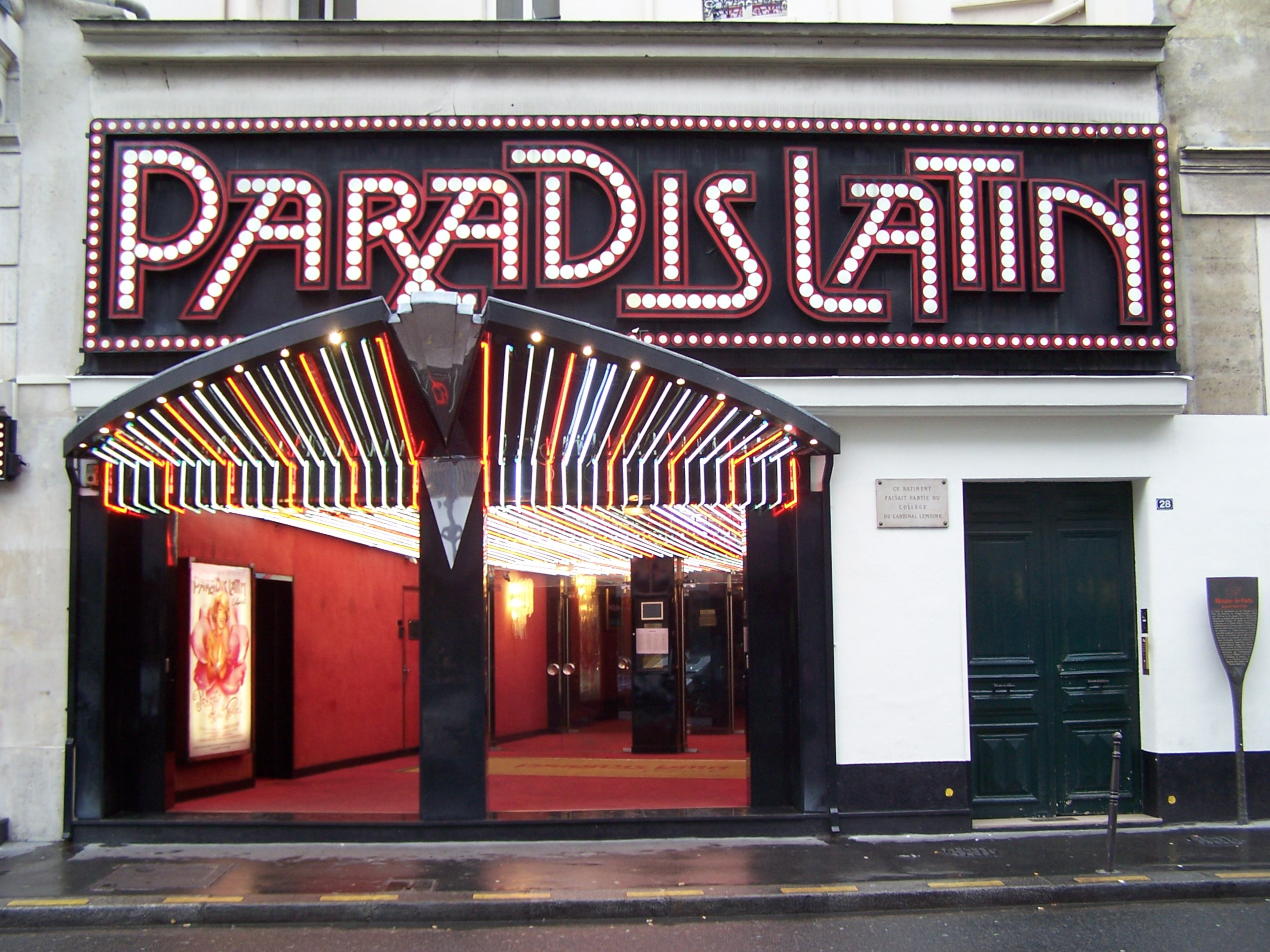

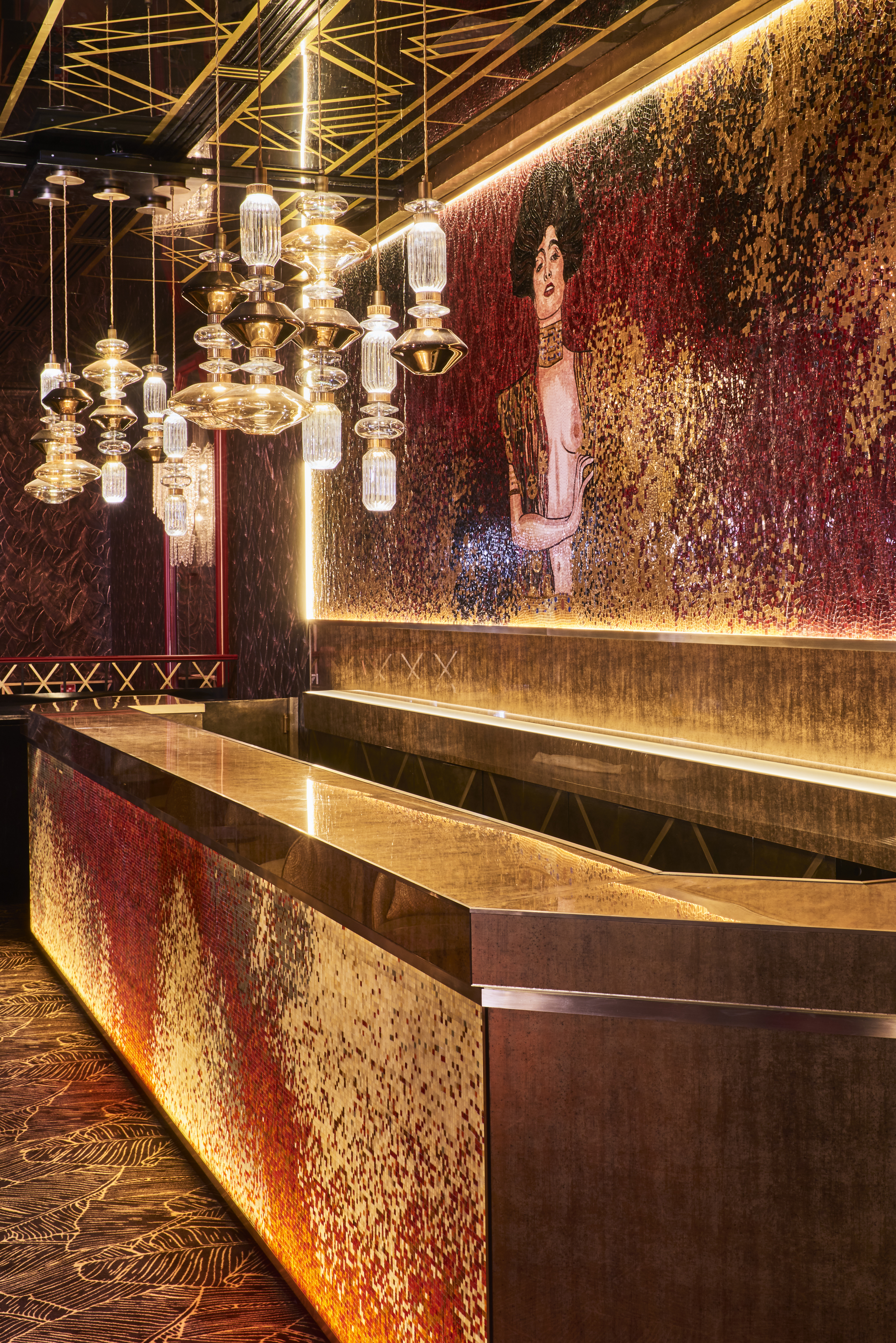

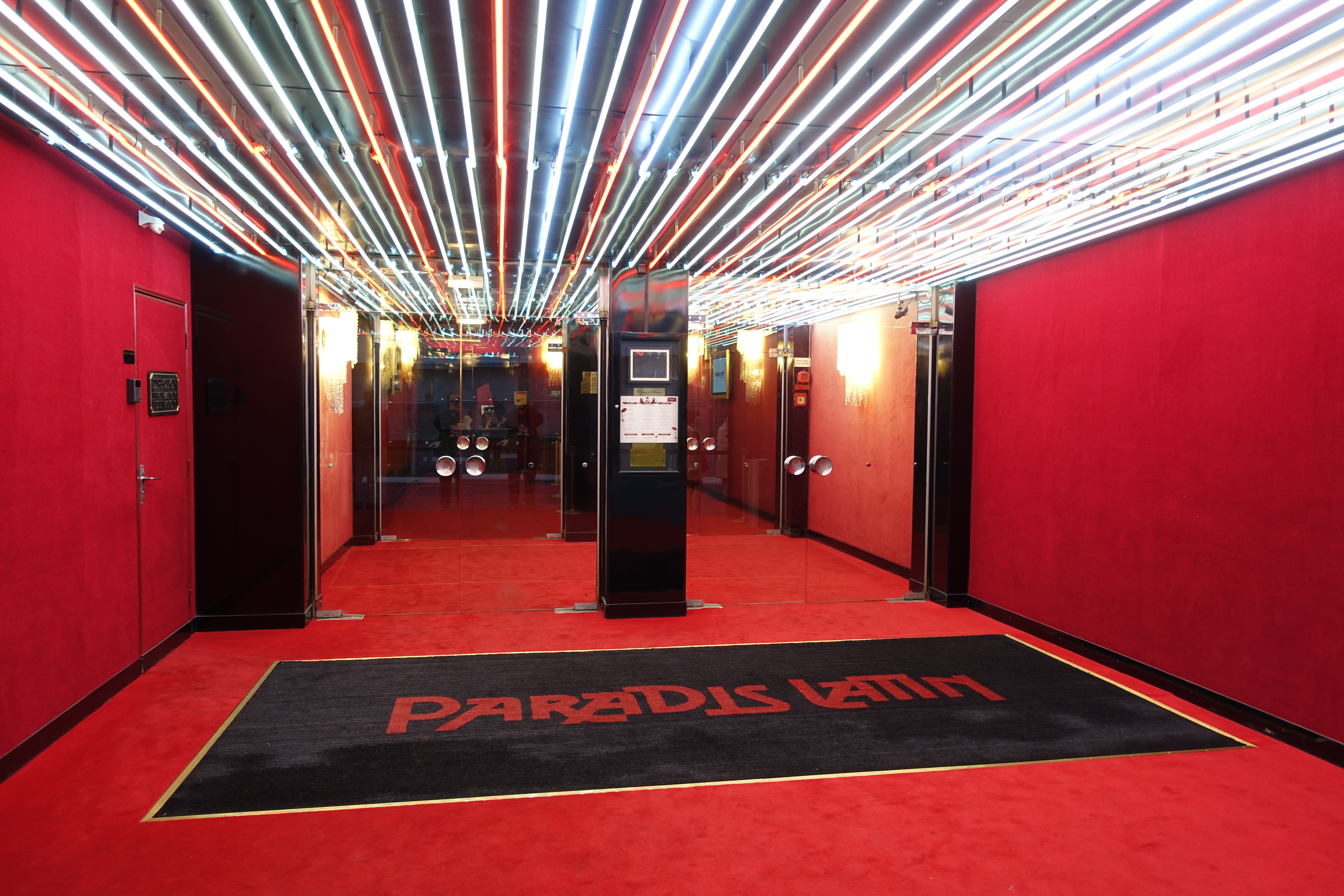

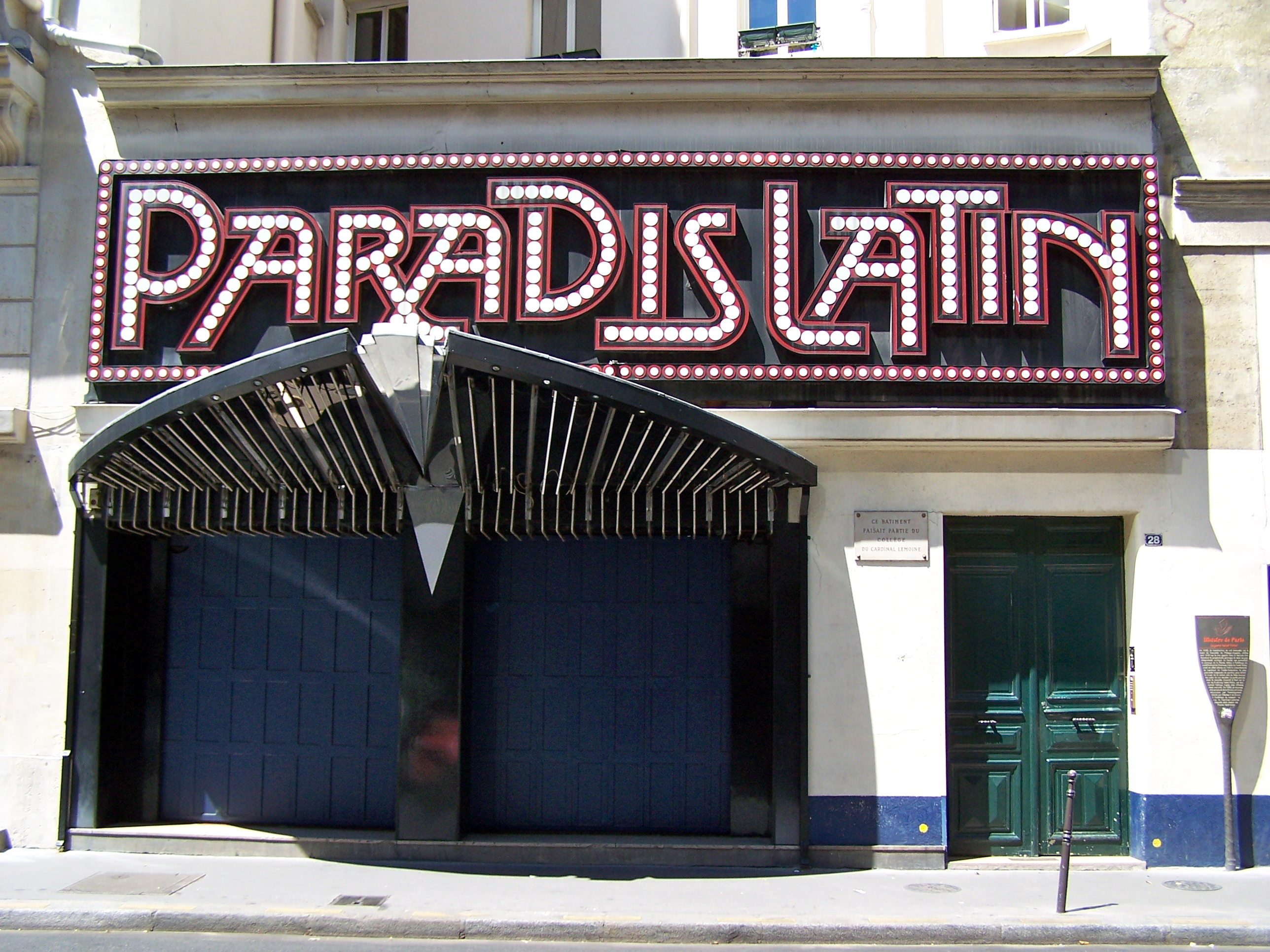

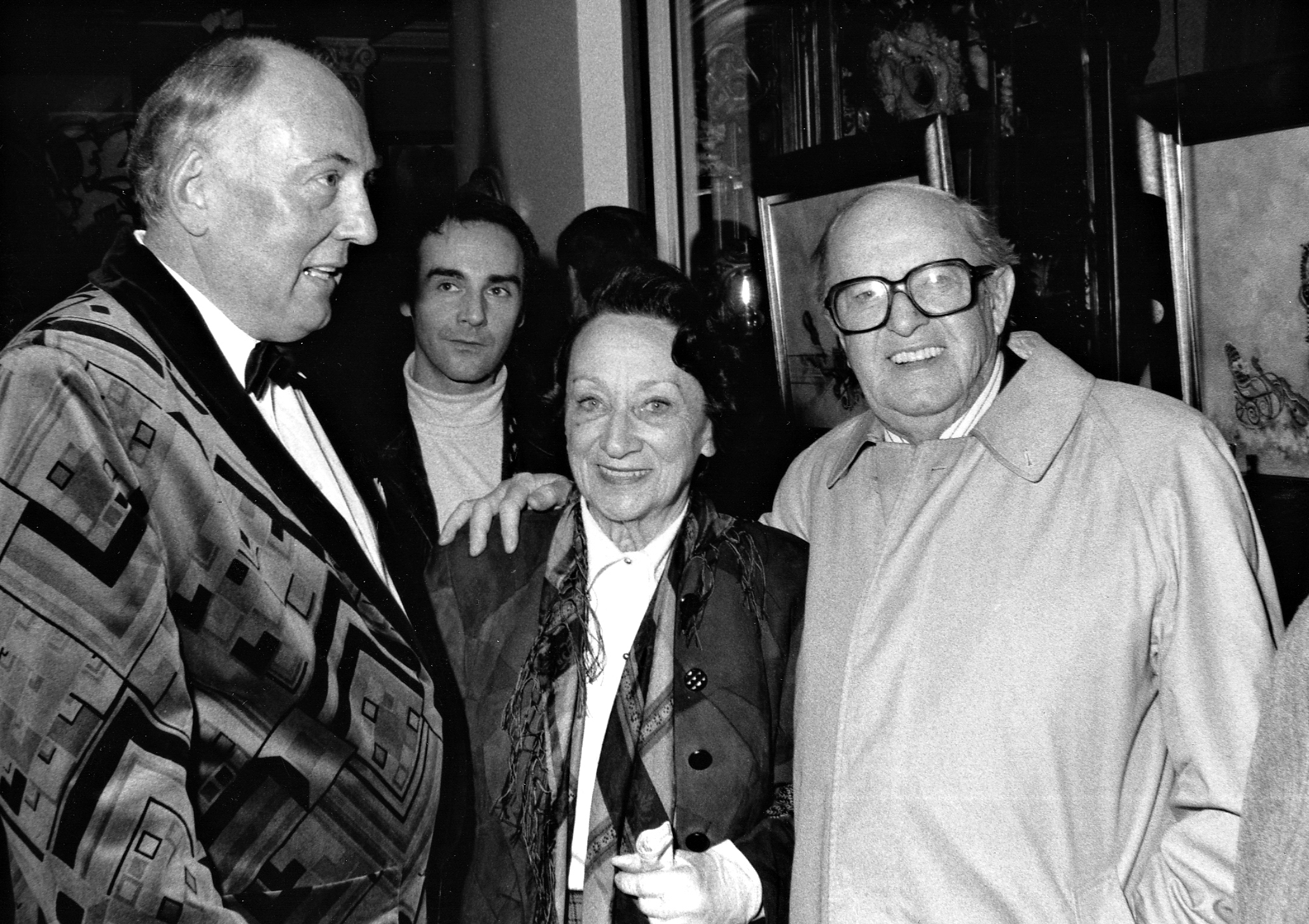
François Boucheix
Posters

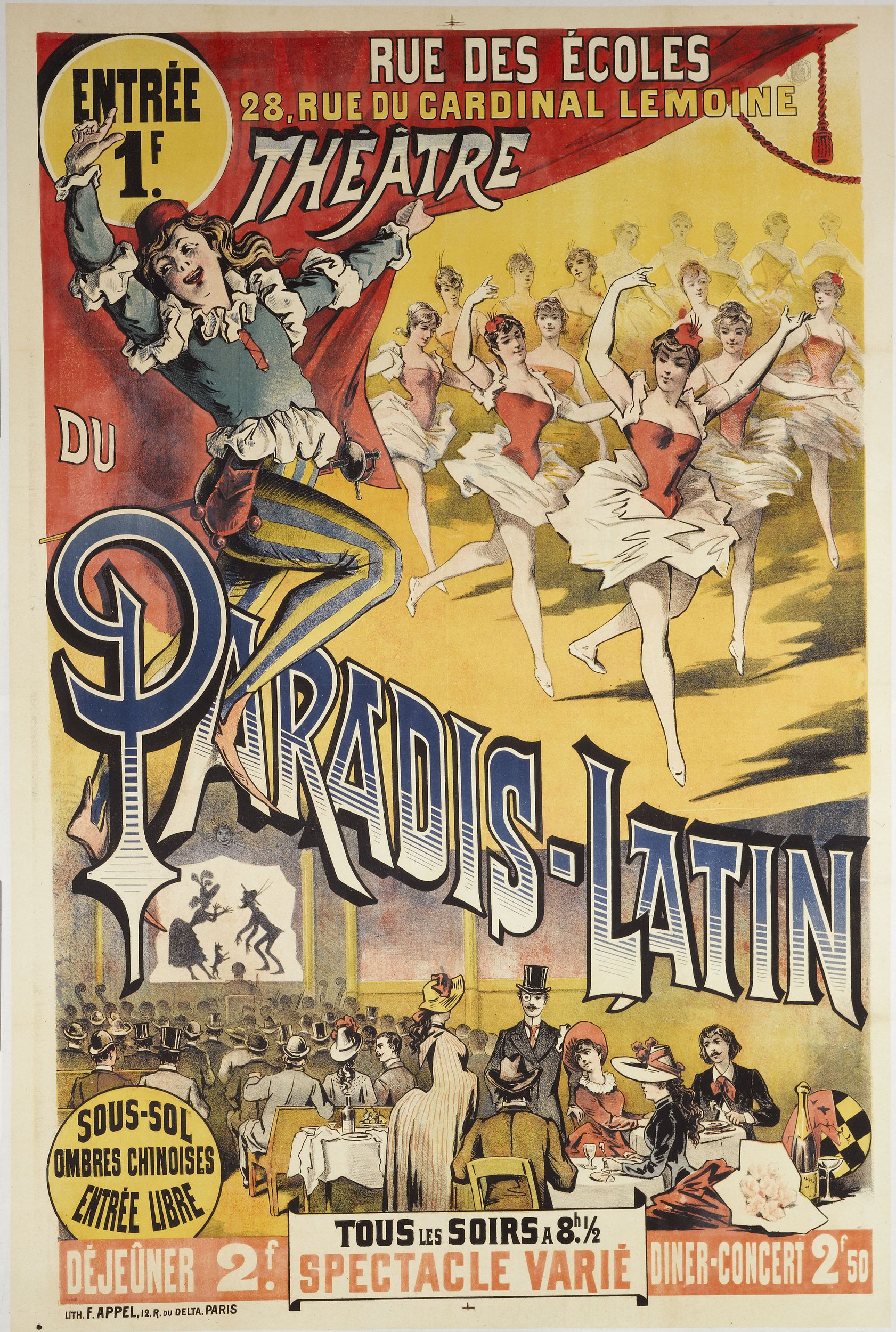

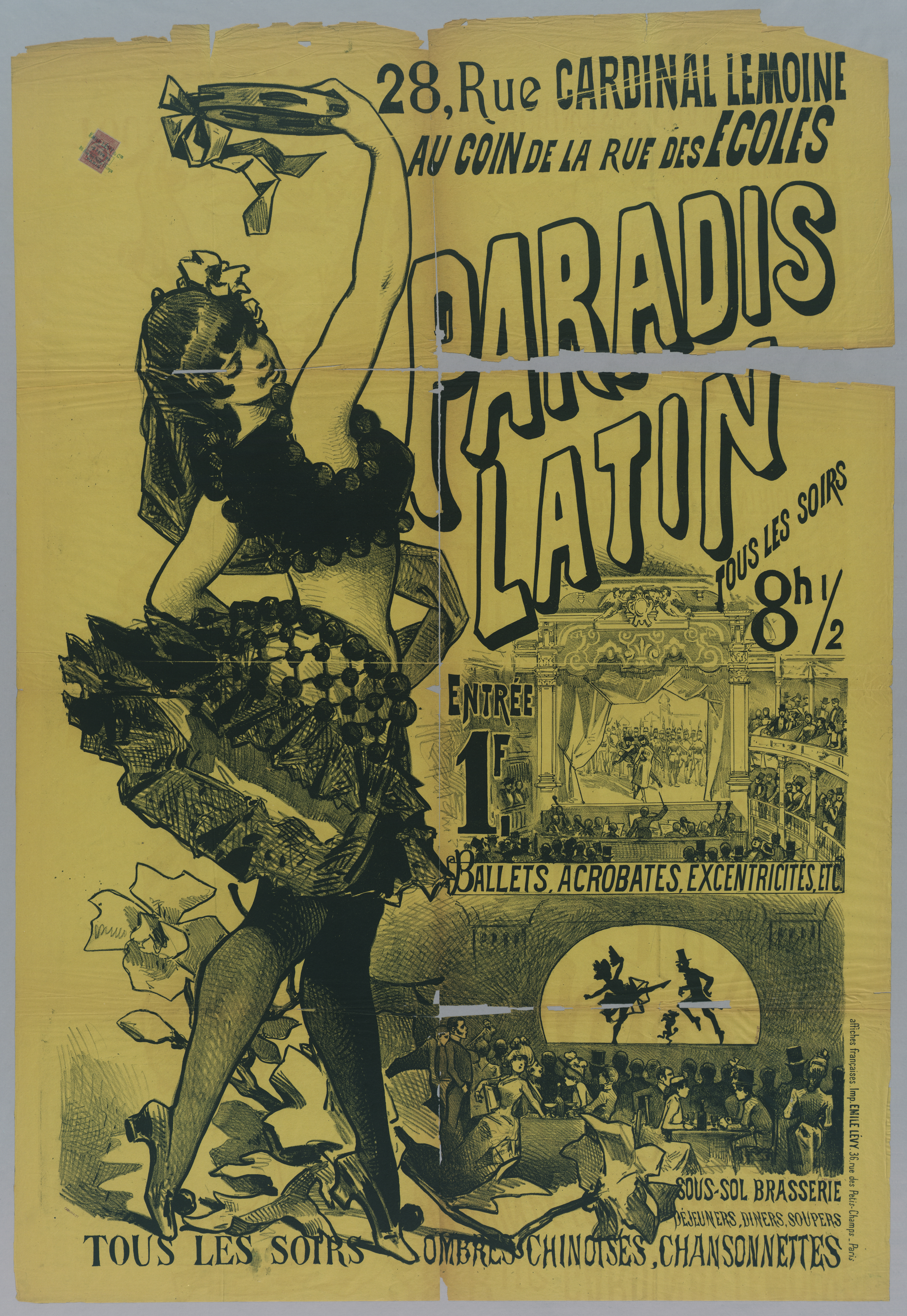

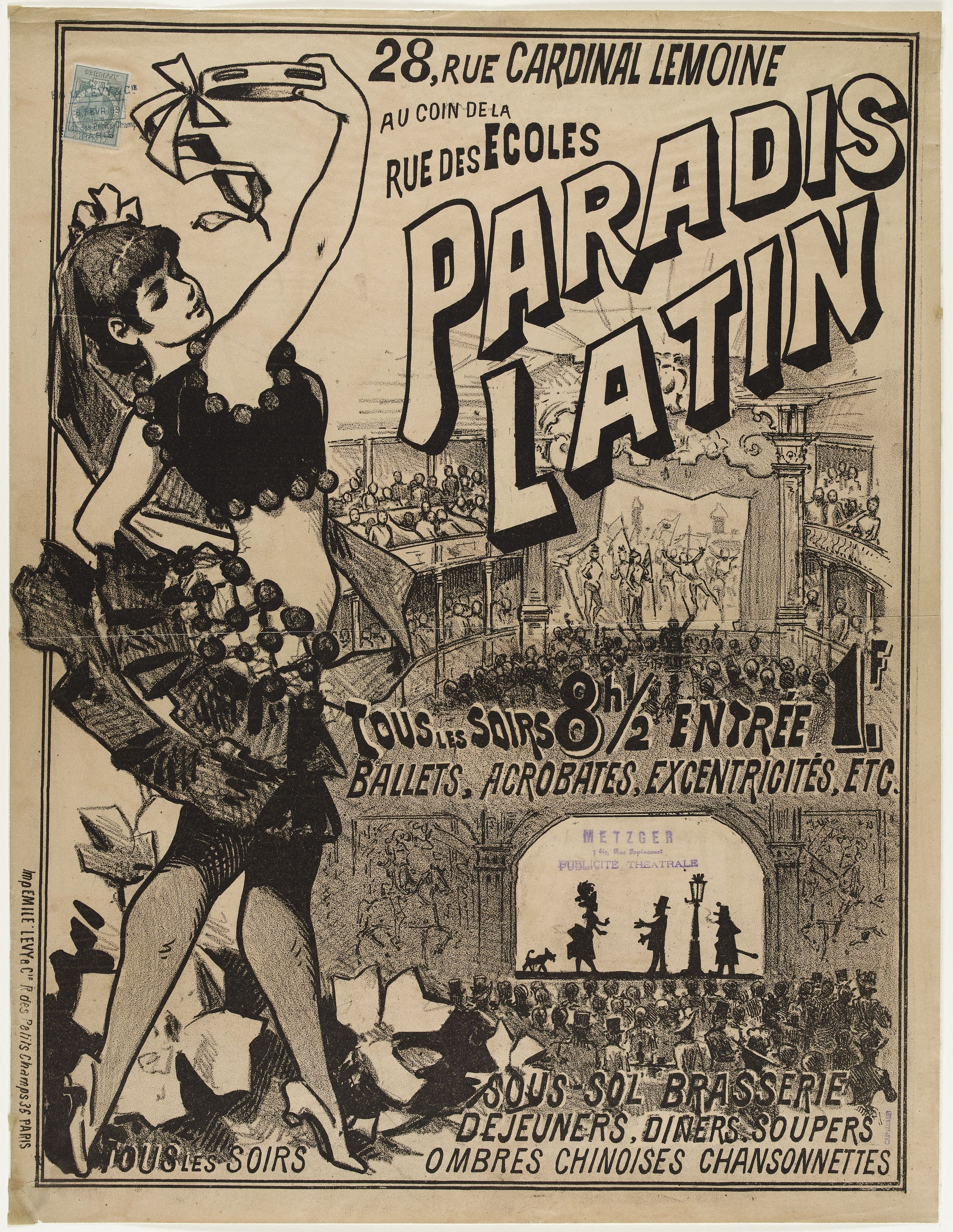

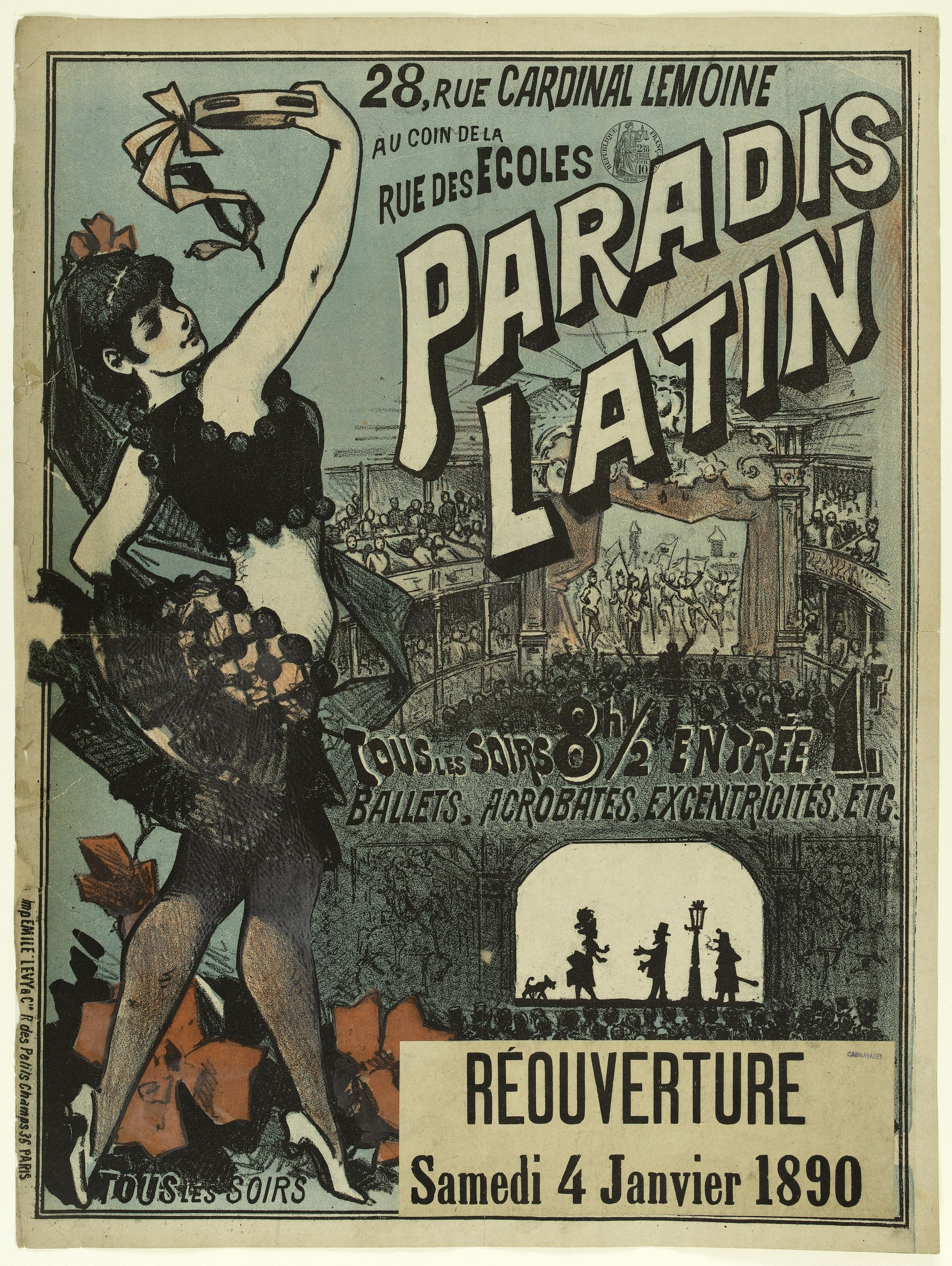

== See also ==
- Showgirl
- Iris Mittenaere (Miss Universe 2016)
- fr:Revue (théâtre)
- Revue
- Peepshow

Venues:

- Casino de Paris
- Folies Bergère
- Le Lido
- Minsky's Burlesque
- Moulin Rouge
- Tropicana Club
- Stardust Resort and Casino, venue for Lido de Paris and Enter the Night

Theatre groups:

- Cabaret Red Light

Shows:

- Absinthe – a Las Vegas show
- Jubilee! – a revue show in Las Vegas
- Peepshow – a burlesque show in Nevada
- Sirens of TI – a Las Vegas casino show
