= Butler Capital Partners =

- Company type: Private
- Industry: Private equity
- Founded: 1990; 36 years ago
- Founder: Walter Butler
- Headquarters: Paris, France
- Products: Leveraged buyout
- Total assets: €500 million
- Website: www.butlercapitalpartners.com

Butler Capital Partners is a French private equity firm headquartered in Paris. The firm focuses primarily on investments in France and Europe, and operates in a variety of business sectors including distribution, logistics, advertising, information technology, publishing and market research.

== History ==
The firm was founded in 1991 by businessman Walter Butler, and is based in Paris, France.

Some of the firm's notable investments include Virgin Megastores, Paris Saint-Germain F.C. and SNCM.

== See also ==
- Eurazeo
- Newfund
- Fondinvest Capital
- PAI Partners
