= MS Pascal Paoli =

Cruise ferry built in The Netherlands

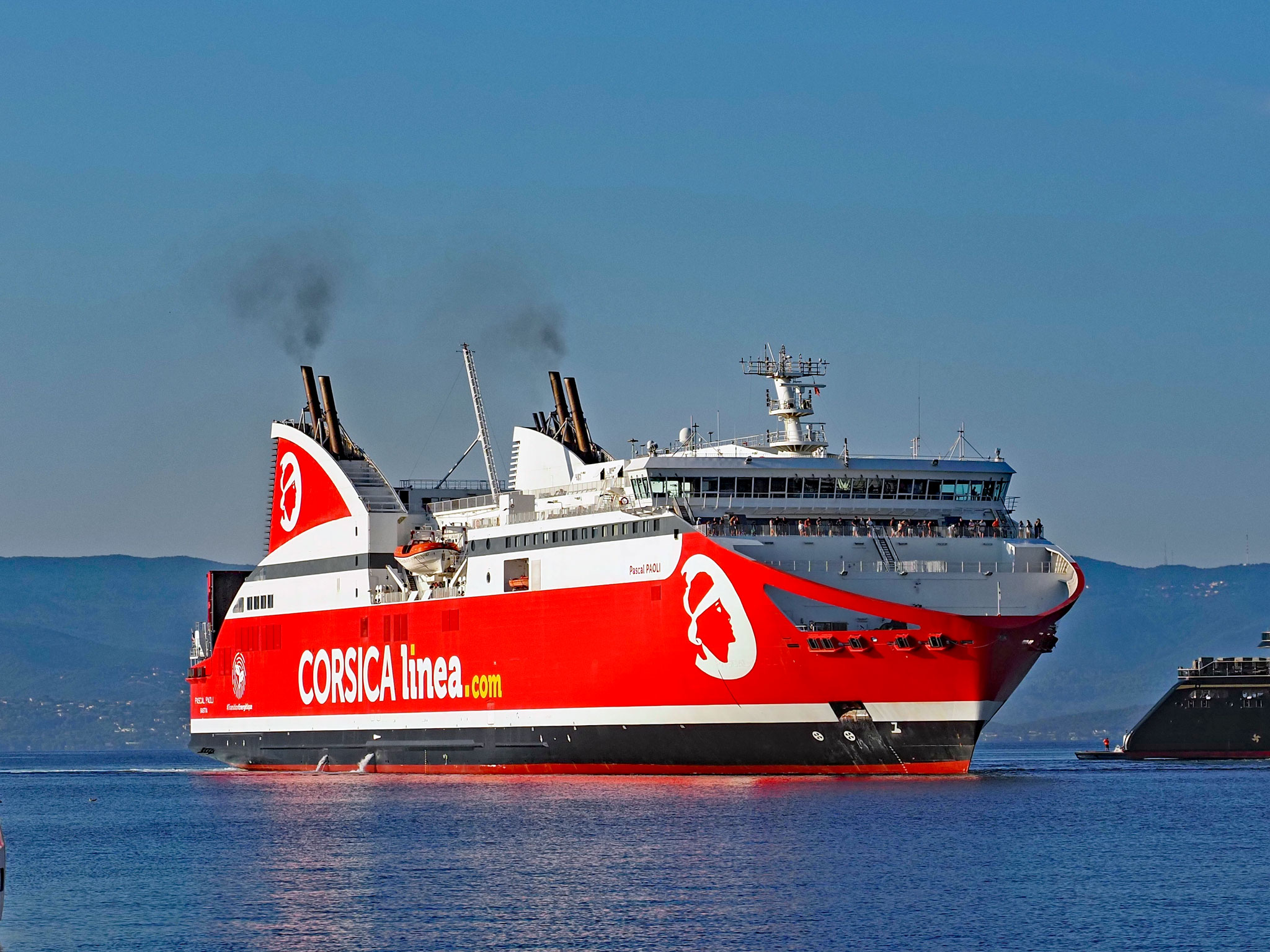
- Pascal Paoli in Ajaccio

History
- Name: (2003–present): Pascal Paoli
- Owner: (2003–2016): SNCM; (2016–present): Corsica Linea / MCM
- Operator: (2003–2016): SNCM; (2016–present): Corsica Linea
- Port of registry: (2003–present): Bastia, France
- Route: Marseille – Bastia; Former emergency: Toulon – Bastia / Ajaccio
- Ordered: 29 December 2000
- Builder: Van der Giessen-de Noord; Krimpen aan den IJssel, Netherlands
- Yard number: 988
- Laid down: 29 January 2002
- Launched: 26 October 2002
- Completed: 16 May 2003
- Acquired: 16 May 2003 (by SNCM) 5 January 2016 (by Corsica Linea)
- Maiden voyage: 29 May 2003
- In service: 2003
- Identification: IMO number: 9247510; Call sign: FQDN; MMSI number: 228081000
- Status: In service

General characteristics
- Class & type: Van der Giessen Fast Ro-Pax Ferry
- Tonnage: 35,760 GT; 7,286 DWT
- Length: 176.00 m (577 ft 5 in)
- Beam: 30.50 m (100 ft 1 in)
- Draught: 6.60 m (21 ft 8 in)
- Decks: 9
- Ramps: Two stern loading ramps
- Installed power: 4 × Wärtsilä 9L46 marine diesel engines (total 37,800 kW / 50,690 hp)
- Propulsion: 2 × controllable pitch propellers; 2 × Lips bow thrusters (3,000 kW combined)
- Speed: 23.0 knots (42.6 km/h; 26.5 mph) (service) / 24.0 knots (44.4 km/h; 27.6 mph) (max)
- Capacity: 654 passengers (171 cabins / 544 beds); 130 cars / 2,300 lane metres for freight
- Crew: 72

Pascal Paoli is a roll-on/roll-off ferry owned and operated by Corsica Linea. She was the last ferry built by the Van der Giessen de Noord yard. On January 5, 2016, Pascal Paoli was transferred to the Maritime Corse Méditerranée, a new entity succeeding SNCM following its takeover by the Corsican businessman Patrick Rocca. On February 3, after a technical stop at the Tunisian yards of Menzel Bourguiba, the ship arrived at Marseille without any commercial markings. At the end of May 2016, the ship received the red livery of Corsica Linea, the trademark of the Corsican consortium Corsica Maritima which merged with the MCM. The ship departed Marseille for Bastia on May 25, 2016, for its first voyage under its new colors.

== Name ==
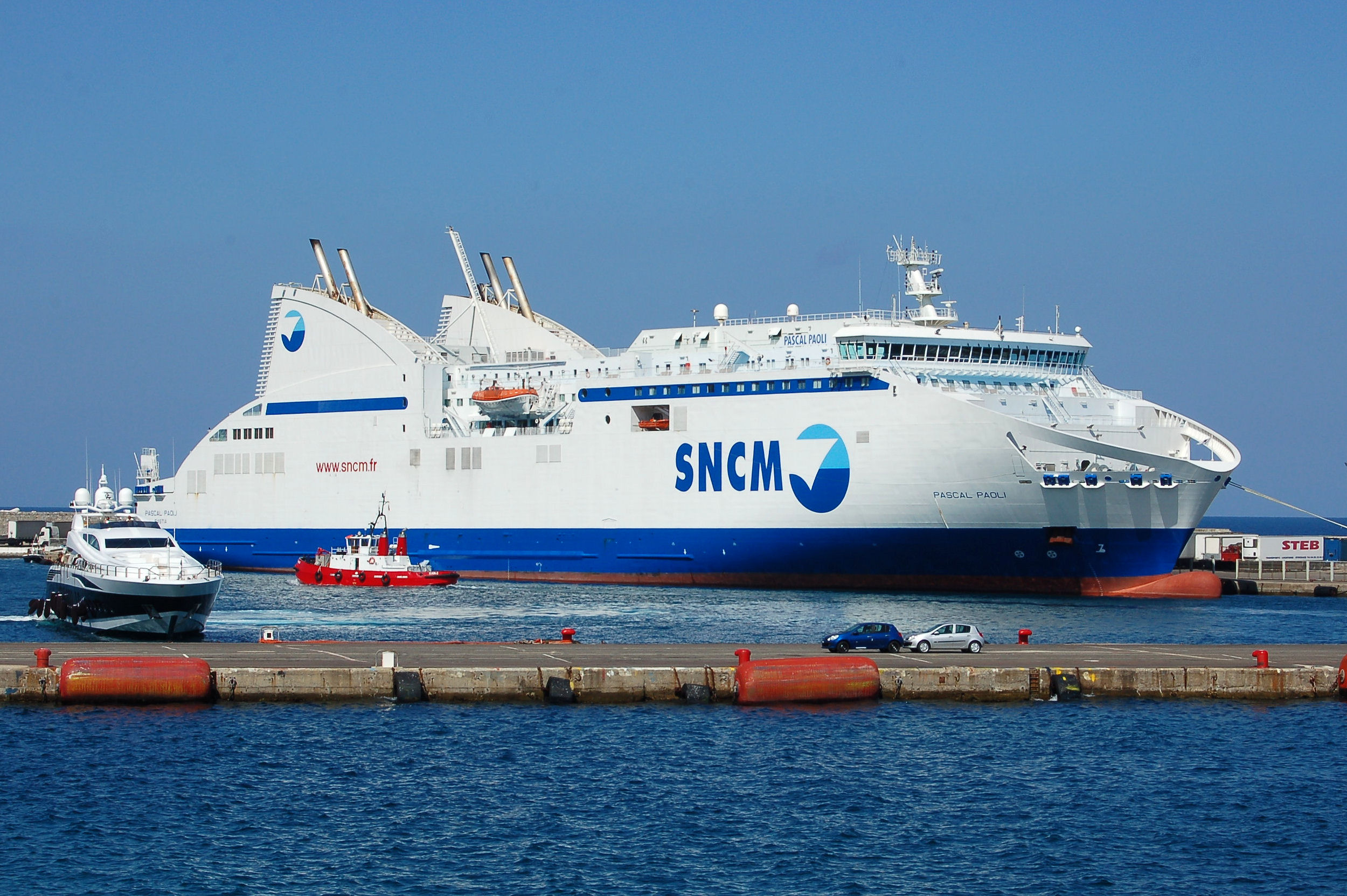
Pascal Paoli at the port of Bastia

The ship is named after Pasquale Paoli (April 6, 1725 – February 5, 1807), a Corsican patriot, statesman and military leader who was at the forefront of resistance movements against the Genoese and later French rule in Corsica. He became the president of the Executive Council of the General Diet of the People of Corsica, and also designed and wrote the Constitution of the state.

== Routes ==
Pascal Paoli operates between Marseille and Bastia on the island of Corsica. The 220-nautical-mile (410 km; 250 mi) overnight trip takes 12 hours.

== Incidents ==
=== Boarding by GIGN (2005) ===
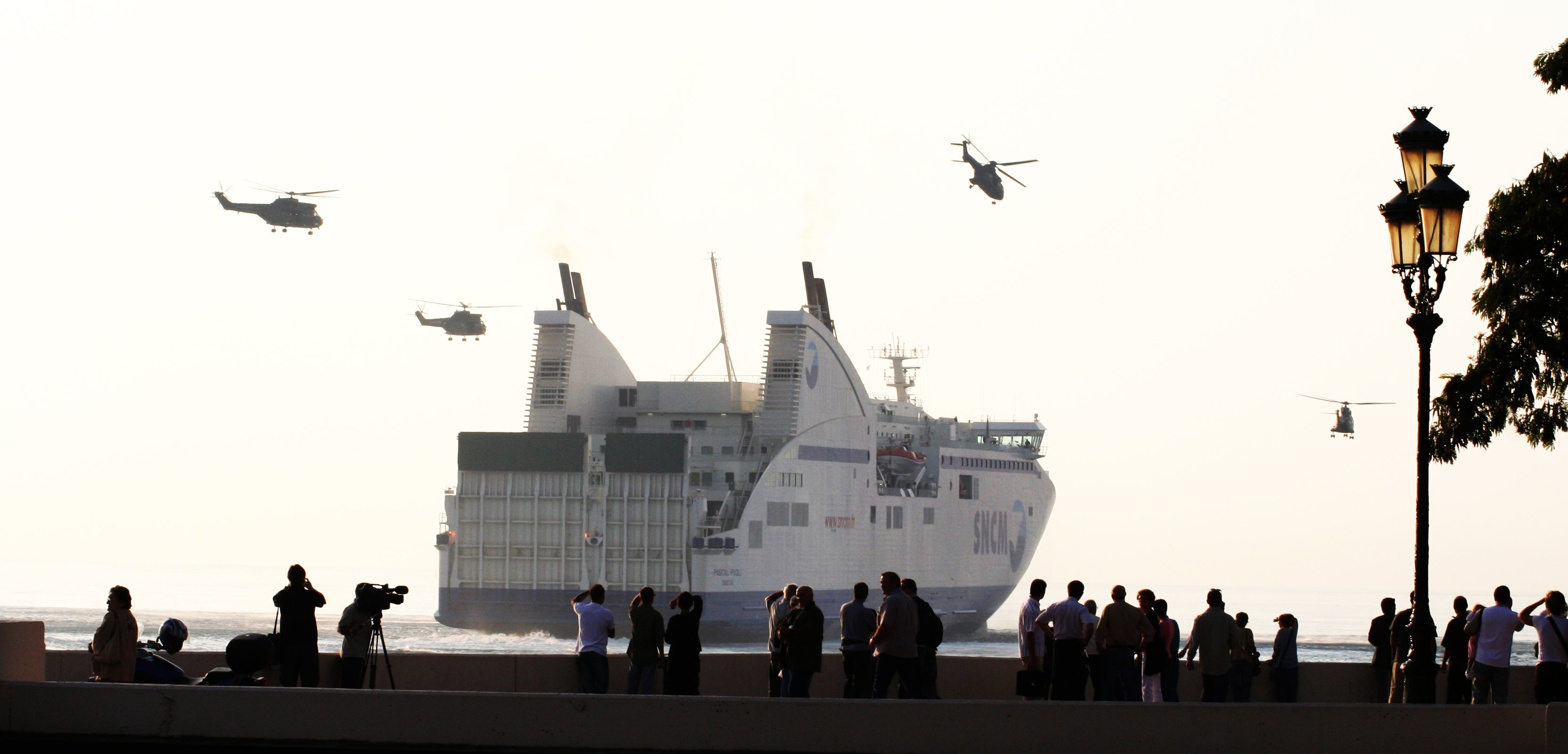
French GIGN special forces operating by air approach the SNCM ferry Pascal Paoli

On September 27, 2005, during the social unrest following the decision to privatize SNCM that owned and operated the ship, striking sailors of the Corsican Workers' Trade Union occupied Pascal Paoli, docked at the seawall off the port of Marseille, with the plan to move the ship to Bastia. The commander was instructed to steer the ship to Corsica.

After departure, Pascal Paoli was approached by military helicopters. The ship arrived in the vicinity of Bastia around 11 pm but did not approach, as the striking sailors wished, and spent the night a few cable lengths from port. In the early hours of September 28, after authorities had taken a decision overnight, members of the Hubert and GIGN commando, with five helicopters, took possession of the ship. The striking sailors did not resist, and the soldiers gained control of the ship. Under navy escort, the ship was directed towards Toulon, where it docked in the enclosure of the naval base. The ship remained there until October 13, when it departed for Marseille in the evening.

=== 2019 Labor union strikes ===
On June 21, 2019, a labor union strike began in the port of Marseille, France. Employees of La Méridionale seized the port, preventing three other Corsica Linea ships from leaving port and continuing their regular routes. Pascal Paoli provided emergency crossings from Toulon, France (south of Marseille) to Bastia, Corsica, France during this time. On June 23, 2019, Pascal Paoli became paralyzed, as part of the labor strike, in Port Bastia. It remained in the port till the end of the strike on June 27, 2019. Pascal Paoli returned to regular route service following the strike.

=== Boarding by National Gendarmerie (2019) ===
On September 20, 2019, off-duty soldiers amongst the passengers aboard Pascal Paoli reported Muslim passengers as taking part in suspicious activities. The National Gendarmerie boarded the ship with six armed officers just off the coast of Toulon, France. The suspicious passengers were detained and later released with no arrests, as the officers determined the passengers to pose no risk to continued travel.
