= Société nationale maritime Corse Méditerranée =

Société nationale maritime Corse-Méditerranée
- Industry: Passenger transportation Freight transportation
- Founded: 1969 (As CGTM); 1976 (As SNCM)
- Defunct: 2016 (As SNCM)
- Headquarters: Marseille, France
- Area served: France, Italy, Algeria, Tunisia
- Website: www.sncm.fr

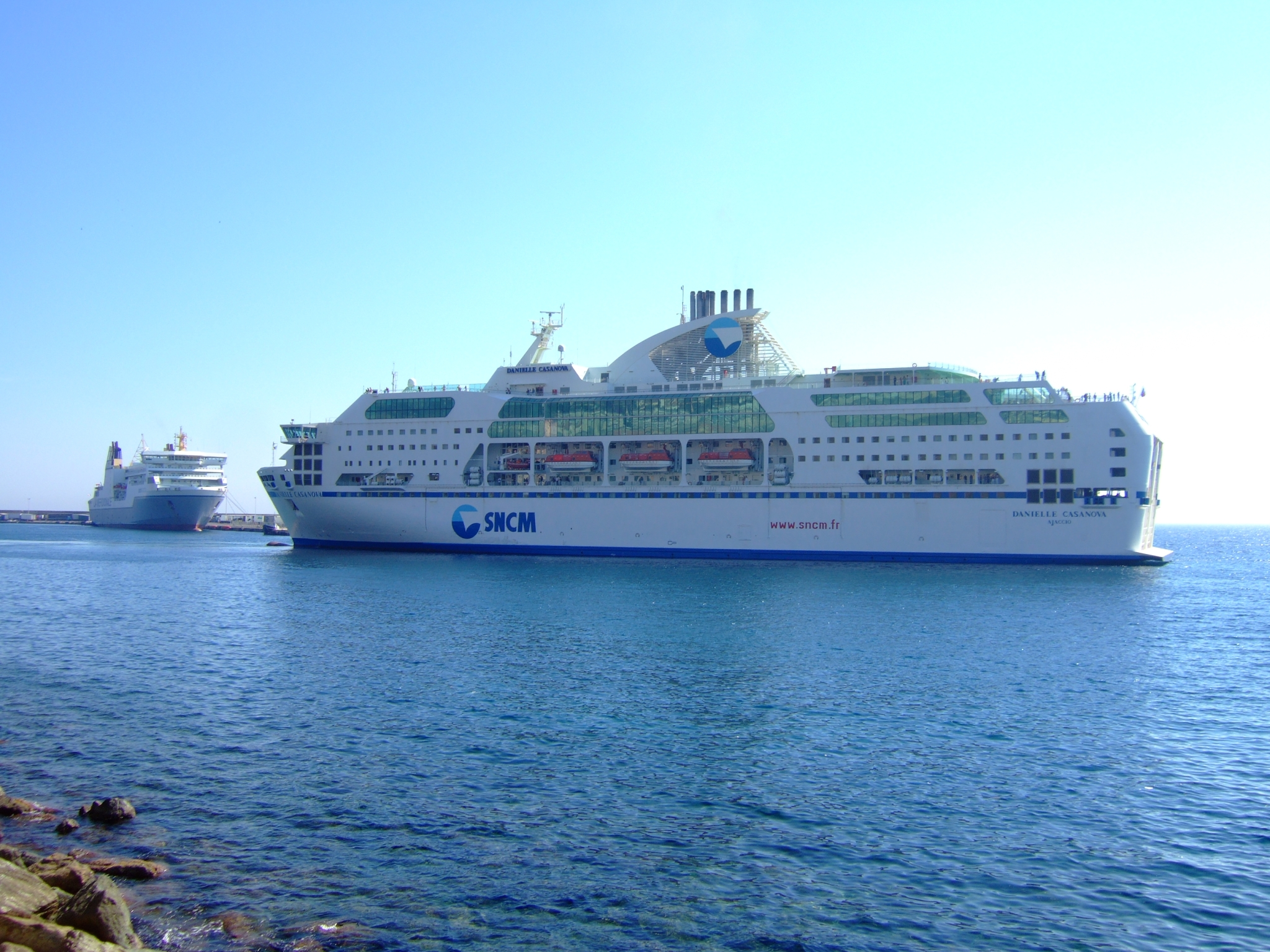
MS Danielle Casanova departing the port of Bastia

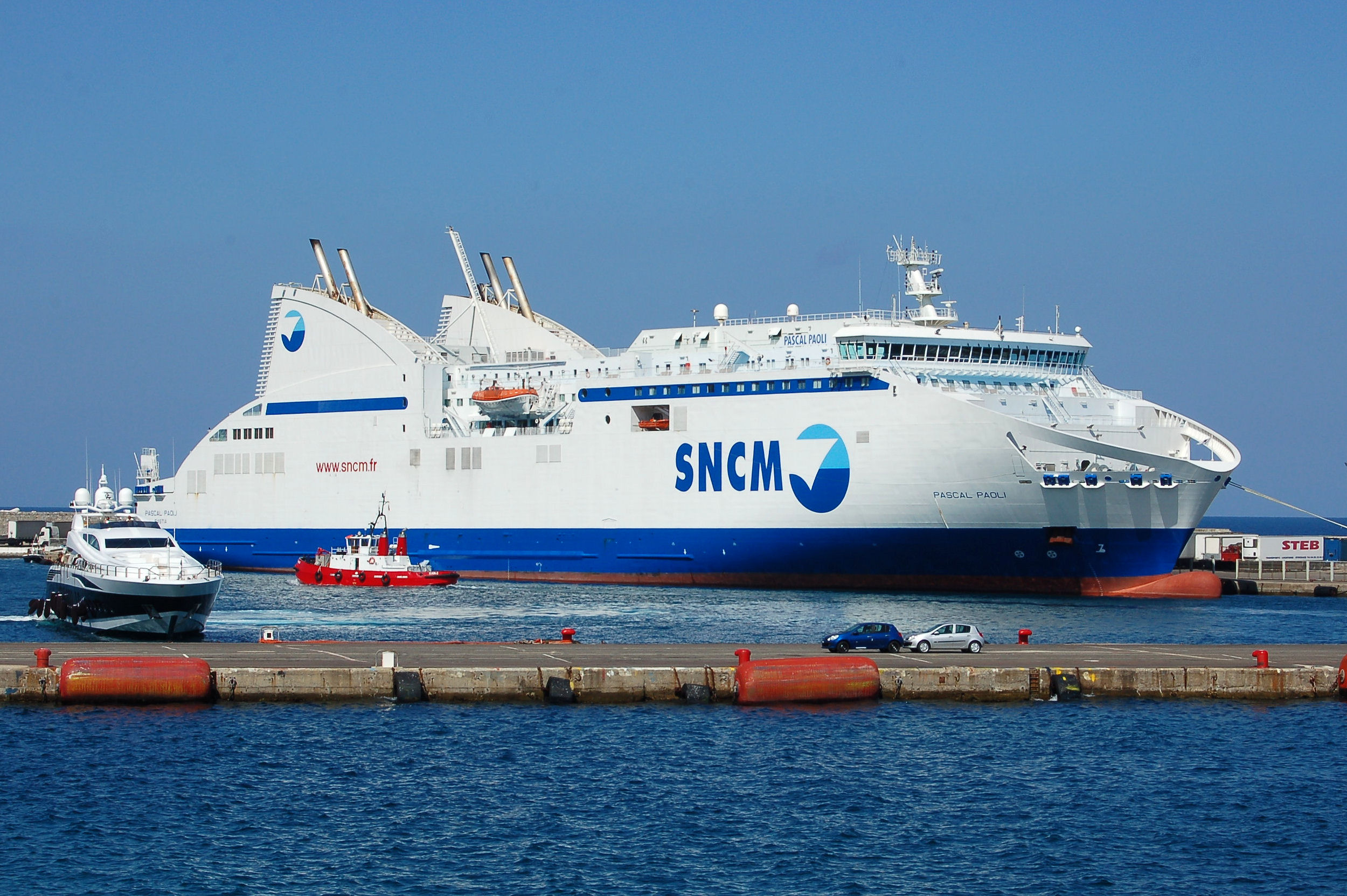
MS Pascal Paoli

Société nationale maritime Corse-Méditerranée (SNCM) was a French ferry company operating in the Mediterranean.

Its ferries sailed from Marseille, Toulon, Nice on mainland France, Calvi, Bastia, Ajaccio, Ile Rousse, Propriano, and Porto Vecchio on Corsica, Porto Torres on Sardinia, Algiers, Oran, Skikda and Bejaia in Algeria as well as Tunis in Tunisia and Genoa in Italy. Since 2016 the fleet of SNCM went to a new company, Corsica Linea.

SNCM traces its history back to 1850.

== History ==
House flag used by SNCM

- In 1855, the Compagnie Générale Maritime was created.
- In 1861, the Compagnie Générale Maritime changed its name to the Compagnie Générale Transatlantique.
- In 1969, the Compagnie générale transméditerranéenne (CGTM) was created by joining the Mediterranean services of the Compagnie générale transatlantique with the Compagnie de navigation mixte.
- In 1976, the CGTM came under state control and changed its name to SNCM. The state ownership was managed 75% by the Compagnie générale maritime (CGM) and 25% by the SNCF, the latter influencing the new name.

== 2005 privatization ==
In September 2005, French Prime minister Dominique de Villepin presented a project of privatization of the company. Villepin was to hand out the SNCM to Butler Capital Partners for 35 million euros, after a previous "recapitalisation" of 113 million euros (injection of new capital by the state). However, this project caused a public outcry, as it put into question the balancing out principle of public transports (péréquation), meaning that to insure the continuity of the national territory and the equality of all concerning this important territorial continuity. In other words, the state-owned SNCM was to insure transport between the mainland and Corsica all year long, even though in exclusive market terms it may not be profitable, so that Corsicans can access administrative services as well as any other Frenchman. Moreover, Walter Butler was Villepin's schoolmate and friend from l'ENA, the elite public servants school.

Following hard negotiations and a strike by the CGT trade-union and the Corsican Workers' Trade Union (STC), a new project was presented. In May 2006, the company was privatized. Connex (which has since become Veolia Transport, a subsidiary of Veolia Environment group) took 28% of the SNCM (against 38% for Butler in the previous arrangement); the state kept 25% of the shares, and 9% sold to the employees. 400 layoffs were planned; in addition to the 113 million euros reinjected by the state before the privatization, 35 million euros were to be given to finance the layoffs.

In 2008, Butler sold its shares to Veolia, who became the main shareholder with 66% of shares. In 2011, the shares were passed on to Veolia Transdev (now simply Transdev), after Veolia merged with Transdev (historic).

The company filed for bankruptcy protection in 2014 and was subsequently placed in receivership of the court of Marseilles.

== Former Fleet ==
- Sidi Bel Abbes (1949-1963) Scrapped in Alang, India in 1988.
- Kaiouran (1950-1974) Scrapped in Spain in 1973.
- Napoleon (1959-1974) Scrapped in Gadani Beach, Pakistan in 1987.
- Fred Scamaroni (1965-1980) Sank as Salem Express while en route to Suez 15 December 1991. 450 passengers died.
- Comte De Nice (1966-1983) Scrapped as Express Naias in Aliağa, Turkey in 2003.
- Corse (1966-1981) Sank as Express Samina at Paros 2 nautical miles away in26 September 2000. 80 passengers died.
- Avenir (1967-1976) Sank as Shahrazad in the Red Sea after a fire on board on 21 September 1985.
- Roussillon (1970-1980) Scrapped as Opi in Aliaga, Turkey in 2002.
- Travetal (1972-1973) Scrapped in Indonesia
- Monte Rotondo (1973-2002) scrapped as Tramola 1 in 2023.
- Ile De Beaute (1973-1976) scrapped in Chittatong Roads Bangladesh as Empress in 2004.
- Provence (1974-1989) scrapped as Bel Air in Aliağa, Turkey in 1999.
- Napoleon (1976-2002) scrapped as Berkane in Aliaga, Turkey in 2015.
- L'Isere (1976-1984) Scrapped in 2010.
- L'aude (1978-1997) as Meyra since 2011
- Cyrnos (1979-1990) scrapped as Beau in Aliağa, Turkey in 2013.
- Liberte (1980-2002) scrapped as Biladi in Aliaga, Turkey in 2013.
- Esterel (1981-1997) scrapped as Mistral Express in Aliaga, Turkey in 2016.
- Corse (1983-2016) as Grand Ferry since 2018.
- Monte Cinto (1984-2010) as Eden since 2014.
- Danielle Casanova (1989-2002) as Mediteranee for Corsica Linea since 2016
- Monte D'Oro (1991-2016) as Monte D'Oro for Corsica Linea since 2016
- Paglia Orbia (1994-2016) as Paglia Orbia for Corscica Linea since 2016
- NGV Asco (1996-2005) sank as Panagia Parou in Algeciras in 2017 and scrapped in Aliaga, Turkey in 2018.
- NGV Aliso (21996-2004) as Kalli P for Idomeneas Lines since 2015 laid up in Perama, Greece
- Napoleon Bonaparte (1996-2014) as Rhapsody for Grandi Navi Veloci since 2014.
- NGV Liamone (2000-2009) scrapped as Tai Min Star in Taiwan in 2020.
- Danielle Casanova (2002-2016) as Danielle Casanova for Corsica Linea since 2016.
- Pascal Paoli (2003-2016) as Pascal Paoli for Corsica Linea since 2016.
- Jean Nicoli (2007-2016) as Jean Nicoli for Corscica Linea since 2016.
- NGV Liamone II (2010-2010) laid up in Perama, Greece as Aelos Kenteris I since 2011.
- Excelsior (2013-2014) as Excelsior for Grandi Navi Veloci.
- El. Venizelos (2013-2014) as El. Venizelos for ANEK Lines
