= Corsica Linea =

Shipping company operating in the Mediterranean Sea

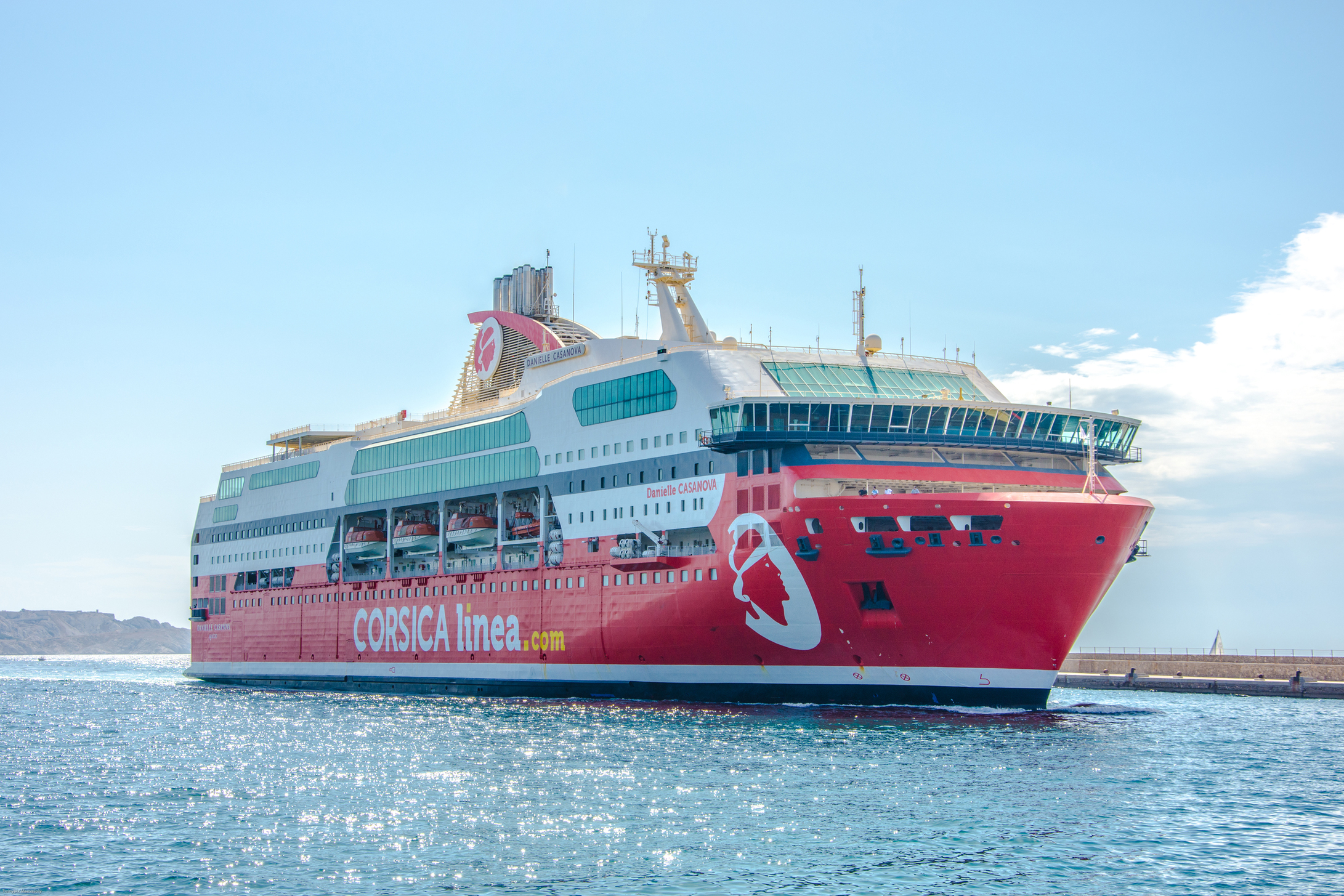
- Danielle Casanova
- Type: Private company
- Industry: Maritime Transport (passengers and freight)
- Founded: January 5, 2016; 10 years ago
- Founder: François Padrona; Pascal Trojani
- Headquarters: Ajaccio, France
- Revenue: ▲€158 million (2021)
- Owner: CM Holding
- Number of employees: 1104 employees (2021)

Corsica Linea is a French shipping company that operates passenger, vehicle and cargo ferries in the Mediterranean Sea.

The company's nine vessels serve routes connecting Marseille with Corsica, Algeria and Tunisia.

== History ==
On 20 November 2015, the SNCM, a previous ferry operator operating similar routes, was placed into receivership, having been in financial difficulties for more than a year. The assets of this company subsequently passed to Maritime Corse Méditerranée (MCM). Following this, a consortium of companies known as Corsica Marittima founded a new company named Corsica Linea, which commenced operations on 5 January 2016.

The first route was started between Marseille and Bastia, initially using the vessel Stena Carrier, hired from Stena Lines, then using Corsica Linea Dui, hired from Transfennica.

On 17 February 2016, Corsica Linea and MCM announced their merger, with all MCM property moving to Corsica Linea and Patrick Rocca, the owner, becoming a member of Corsica Marittima, the operating consortium.

During the next year, the former SNCM fleet was repainted into a new red, white and black livery. The only former SNCM vessel not to move into the Corsica Linea fleet was Corse, which was sold in spring 2016.

During the 2016 financial year, Corsica Linea estimated €170 million in revenue, a 40% increase compared to SNCM's operations in the previous year.

In 2019, Corsica Linea announced an order for their first new RoPax ferry from Cantiere Navale Visentini in Porto Viro. A Galeotta entered service in 2023 on the Marseille-Bastia route and is the first ferry to serve Corsica that is powered by LNG, demonstrating Corsica Linea's commitment to improving the energy performance and emissions of their vessels. The entry into the fleet of this new vessel will also allow the full-time transfer of the Jean Nicoli to the Maghreb lines and thus develop the service to Algeria with the reinforcement of the Marseille - Béjaïa line and the opening of a new link to Skikda. Other investments will be made to improve the quality of the service such as the renovation of the Mediterranean ferry. Also on this network, Corsica Linea will experiment before and after the season with new connections from Sète to Béjaïa and Skikda using the cargo ship Kalliste, chartered from La Méridionale.

On 8 January 2024, Corsica Linea announced the signing of a contract with Stena RoRo for a second new vessel, this time an E-Flexer powered by LNG. It will enter service in March 2026 on the Marseille-Ajaccio and Bastia routes, being chartered from Stena with an option for it to be purchased at a later date. It will be constructed at the AVIC Weihai Shipyard, Weihai, China. The vessel is expected to transition to operate with either Bio-LNG or e-LNG at a later date in line with the company's objective to reduce carbon emissions by 40% by 2030.

== Fleet ==
Image	Ship	Flag	Built	Entered service	Gross tonnage	Length	Beam	Passengers	Vehicles	Service speed	Current status
	Danielle Casanova	(France)	2002	2016	41,447 GT	176 m	30.4 m	2800	700	24 knots	In service
	Jean Nicoli	(France)	1998	2016	29,968 GT	200.65 m	25 m	1500	1000	26.4 knots	In service
	Pascal Paoli	(France)	2003	2016	35,760 GT	176 m	30.5 m	550	130	23 knots	In service
	Paglia Orba	(France)	1994	2016	29,718 GT	165.8 m	29 m	600	120	19 knots	In service
	Capu di Muru	(France)	1993	2026	30,178 GT	165 m	29 m	665	160	19 knots	In service
	Méditerranée	(France)	1989	2016	30,985 GT	165.8 m	27.4 m	2780	800	24 knots	In service
	Vizzavona	(France)	1999	2018	30,114 GT	188 m	28.7 m	800	130	23 knots	In service
	A Galeotta	(France)	2022	2023	37,599 GT	206 m	28.2 m	1000	149	22 knots	In service
	Capu Rossu	(France)	2025	2026	38,222 GT	203 m	27.8 m	1035	180	23 knots	In service

== Routes ==
The Corsica Linea fleet makes round trips between Marseille and the ports of Ajaccio, Bastia, Ile Rousse, Propriano on Corsica. In addition, there are weekly departures from Marseille to the Algerian ports of Algiers and Béjaïa, as well as to Tunis. Seasonal connections to Skikda operate from June to September.

Lines	Duration	Vessel	Frequency
Marseille ↔ Bastia	13 hours on average	Pascal Paoli; A Galeotta; Vizzavona; Paglia Orba	Daily
Marseille ↔ Ajaccio	12 hours on average	Vizzavona; A Galeotta	On alternate day
Marseille ↔ Ile Rousse	12 hours on average	Monte d'Oro	3x weekly
Marseille ↔ Propriano	13 hours on average	A Nepita; Paglia Orba	3x weekly
Marseille ↔ Tunis	22 hours on average	Jean Nicoli; Danielle Casanova	1x weekly; 3x weekly (June–September)
Marseille ↔ Algiers	22 hours on average	Jean Nicoli; Méditerranée	1x weekly; 3x weekly (June–September)
Marseille ↔ Béjaïa	22 hours on average	Jean Nicoli	1x weekly
Marseille ↔ Skikda	22 hours on average	Jean Nicoli	Seasonal (June–September)
Sète ↔ Béjaïa	22 hours on average	Jean Nicoli	Seasonal (June–September)
Sète ↔ Skikda	22 hours on average	Jean Nicoli	Seasonal (June–September)

== Other companies ==
- Corsica Ferries
- La Méridionale
- Moby Lines
