= Walter Butler (French businessman) =

French/American businessman

Walter Butler is a French-American businessman. He is the founder of Butler Capital Partners, an investment and private equity firm.

== Early life and education ==
Walter Butler was born in Brazil to a Brazilian mother and an American father. He moved from Brazil to France when he was a child following his parents' divorce.

Butler attended Instituts d'études politiques de Bordeaux where he received a Master of Law degree. He later attended ÉNA, an elite school for high-level civil servants, where he received a degree in 1980.

He is a United States citizen.

== Career ==
After completing studies at the ÉNA, Walter Butler served from 1983 to 1986 as an Inspector of Finances at the French Ministry of Finances. From 1986 to 1988, he was an advisor to the Minister of Culture and Communication François Léotard. In this position, he played a key role in the privatization of French television channel TF1, working alongside Jean-Marie Messier.

In 1988, he joined investment bank Goldman Sachs in New York. From 1988 to 1990, he was executive director of Goldman Sachs in New York City, then London. He has stated that his experience with the firm was where much of his business knowledge was formed.

In 1991, he founded Butler Capital Partners, an investment fund and venture capital business.

Through Butler Capital Partners, Butler is known for his involvement with companies including Flo, Sernam, Ipsos, BDDP, PSG and Virgin. Butler is also known for his role in the privatization of ferry company National Corsican-Mediterranean Co., SNCM, in 2006.

In 2008, Butler became a stakeholder in Virgin Megastores when Butler Capital Partners purchased a majority stake in Virgin Group from Lagardère.

In 2015, Butler led the acquisition of Isodev, an SME loan platform that had been liquidated earlier that year.

In 2018, Butler became the largest shareholder of Noerden, a Shanghai-based startup that manufactures smart watches and other devices.
