= Fondinvest Capital =

French private equity firm

- Type: Private
- Industry: Private Equity
- Predecessor: Caisse des Dépôts et Consignations
- Founded: 1994; 32 years ago
- Headquarters: Paris, France
- Key people: Charles Soulignac
- Products: Investments, Private equity funds, Secondary market
- AUM: € 1.4 billion
- Website: fondinvest.com

Fondinvest Capital is a French private equity firm, focused on European lower and mid-market private equity funds. The firm was founded in 1994 by Caisse des Dépôts et Consignations ("CDC"), the French state-owned financial institution, as an internal unit to manage private equity investments.

The firm has also been the investment manager of a family of funds offered to external institutional investors, which include public and private pension funds, insurance companies, endowments, banks, and sovereign wealth funds.

As of 2015, the group has deployed over €2 billion in primary funds of funds, secondaries funds and separately managed accounts for institutional investors in Europe, the US, the Middle East and Asia.

== History ==
Charles Soulignac, Fondinvest’s Founder while working at CDC and Managing Director, managed and developed from 1989 to 1993 various investments in private equity funds that the Caisse des Dépôts et Consignations ("CDC") made during the 1980s. In 1994, he established Fondinvest Capital for CDC. Fondinvest continued to manage and develop CDC’s investment program in private equity funds and to include third party investors in future fund of funds vehicles. In 2006, Fondinvest Capital spun off from CDC and became independent. Fondinvest continues to manage capital for CDC and other French public institutions.

== Funds under management ==
Since its establishment, Fondinvest Capital has managed in €2 billion across its primary and secondary business lines, as well as a number of primary separately managed accounts. The company’s odd-numbered funds are primary funds and even-numbered funds are secondary funds.

=== Primary Funds of Funds ===
Since 1994, the firm has launched four primary funds of funds I, III, V and VII. Fondinvest Capital targets investments in European funds ranging in size from €100 million to €1 billion, and especially buyout and growth capital funds.

=== Secondary Funds ===
Since 1996, the firm has launched four secondaries funds II, IV, VI and VIII. Since the inception of the Firm’s secondary investment activity, Fondinvest has focused on primarily acquiring European middle market assets in the global private equity secondary market, targeting small- to mid-sized transactions that range in total deal value between €0.5 million and €50 million. Fondinvest has extensive global networks of GP’s and LP’s which generate "off-radar" opportunities. The California State Teachers' Retirement System (CalSTRS) reported Fondinvest VI returned a 23.30% internal rate of return (IRR), as of March 31, 2015. CalSTRS is also currently the thirteenth largest public pension fund in the world.

=== Separately Managed Accounts ===
Since 2000, Fondinvest Capital has developed discretionary and non-discretionary separately managed accounts for investors.
