= MS Danielle Casanova =

French cruiseferry

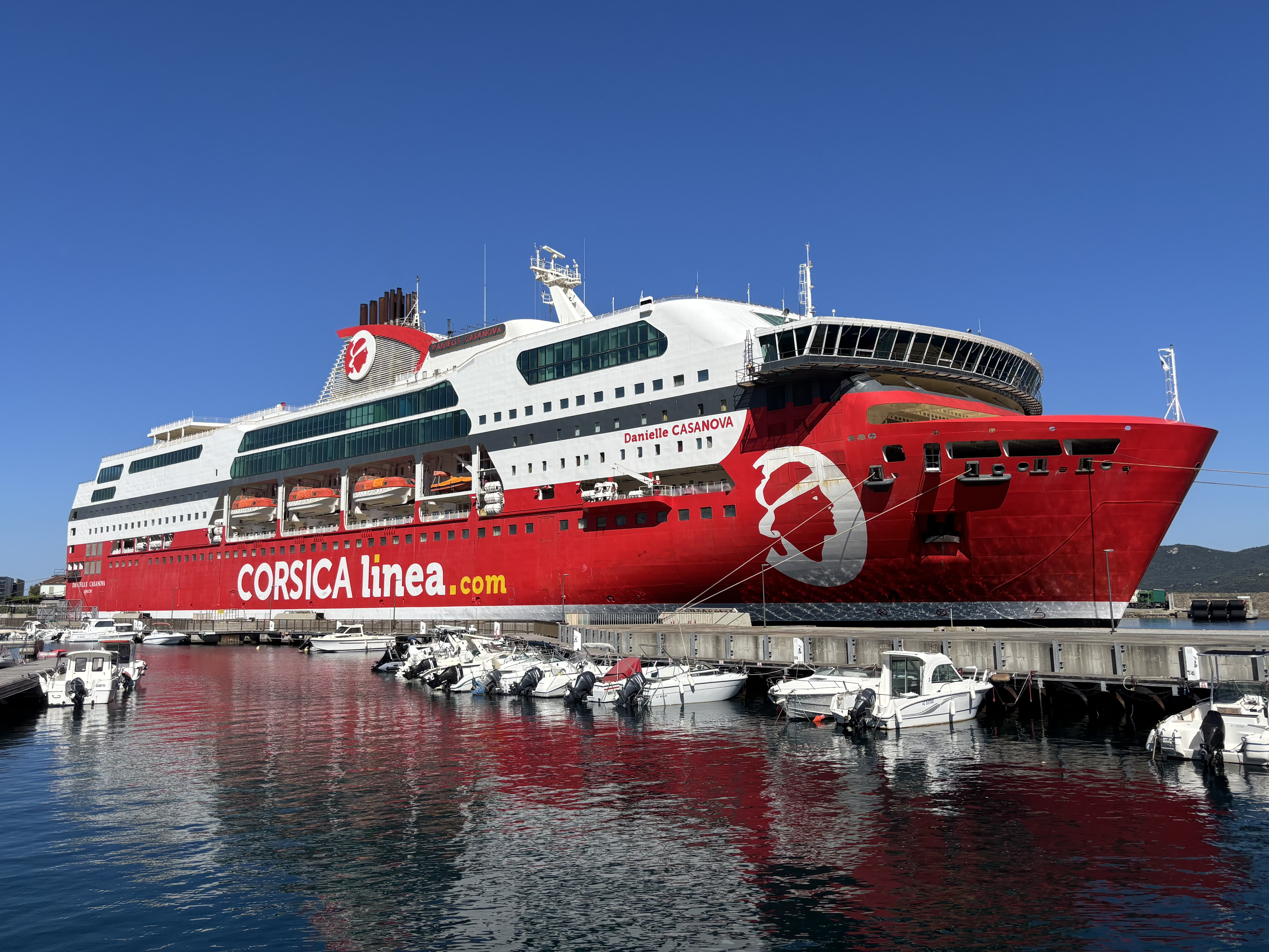
- MS Danielle Casanova

History
- Name: Under construction: Mediterranee; 2002–onwards: Danielle Casanova
- Owner: 2002–2016: SNCM; 2016–onwards: Robin de Malet Fiduciaire
- Operator: 2002–2016: SNCM; 2016–onwards: Corsica Linea
- Port of registry: Ajaccio, France
- Ordered: 23 March 2000
- Builder: Fincantieri, Ancona, Italy
- Cost: €150 M
- Yard number: 6081
- Laid down: 28 February 2001
- Launched: 28 November 2001
- Completed: 26 June 2002
- Maiden voyage: 5 July 2002
- In service: 2002–present
- Identification: Call sign: FILL; IMO number: 9230476; MMSI number: 226242000
- Status: In service

General characteristics
- Type: Cruiseferry
- Tonnage: 41,447 GT
- Length: 176 m (577 ft 5 in)
- Beam: 30.4 m (99 ft 9 in)
- Draught: 6.6 m (21 ft 8 in)
- Installed power: 4 × Wärtsilä 9L46C; 37,800 kW (combined)
- Propulsion: Two shafts; controllable pitch propellers
- Speed: 24 knots (44 km/h; 28 mph)
- Capacity: 2,400 passengers; 1,860 passenger beds; 700 vehicles (1000 lane meters)
- Crew: 172

MS Danielle Casanova is a French cruiseferry operated by Corsica Linea. She was built at Fincantieri in Ancona, Italy for the French ferry operator SNCM as Mediterranee but was renamed after her launch. She was put in 2002 on the Marseille–Corsica route, replacing the former Danielle Casanova which was put to the Marseille–Algeria–Tunisia. The newer Danielle Casanova was itself later transferred to Corsica Linea's fleet after the bankruptcy of the SNCM in 2016. She then sailed on the Marseille–Tunisia–Algeria route.

== Name ==
The ship is named after Danielle Casanova (9 January 1909 – 9 May 1943), a Corsican hero of the French Resistance during World War II who was captured and deported to Auschwitz where she died.

== See also ==
- Largest ferries of Europe
