= La Méridionale =

Shipping company operating in Corsica

- Formerly: Compagnie méridionale de navigation (1931–2011)
- Industry: Maritime Transport (passengers and freight)
- Founded: 1931; 95 years ago
- Founder: Henri et Félix Rastit
- Headquarters: Marseille, France
- Revenue: ▲€109 million
- Owner: Independent (1931–92); STEF (1992–2023); CMA CGM (2023–present)
- Number of employees: 500 employees
- Website: lameridionale.fr

La Méridionale is a French shipping company that provides passage to Corsica. After being managed by STEF, the passenger ferry operator was acquired in May 2023 by the CMA CGM Group.

The company's three vessels serve the Corsican ports of Bastia, Ajaccio and Propriano, and Porto Torres in Sardinia. The fleet is exclusively composed of mixed vessels (freight and passengers).

== History ==
The entity currently known as La Méridionale began its history with the formation of the Compagnie méridionale de navigation, the oldest carrier serving Corsica. This company emerged when the children of the Giannoni and Rastit families got married in 1931, which resulted in the creation of links with the region.

At first, the company transported petroleum products and general cargo. In 1970 it adopted the Roll-on/roll-off style and strengthened the Corsica-Continent links.

At the beginning of 1990, La Méridionale was the leading French shipping company in the Mediterranean and France's second largest operator of passenger ships at the national level. After joining the STEF group in 1992, it outfitted the Kalliste the following year and obtained both ISM and ISO 9002 certifications.

In November 2001, it renewed its public service concession with SNCM between Marseille and Corsica. A decade later, following the arrival of the ship Piana and existing ships Girolata, Kalliste and Scandola were repainted, La Compagnie méridionale de navigation (known as CMN) changed its logo to La Méridionale.

At the end of 2016, the Girolata was repainted and work was carried out to install a ballast water treatment system - the same modifications were made to the Kalliste the following year. On 1 January 2017, La Méridionale began weekly service between Propriano (Corsica) and Porto Torres (Sardinia).

In May 2023, the STEF group sold the shipping company to the CMA CGM group.

== Routes ==
La Méridionale's vessels make round trips between Marseille, Corsica (Ajaccio and Porto Vecchio) and Morocco. Sea crossings to Corsica are made at night, with one departure every evening.

Routes	Duration	Vessel	Frequency
Marseille ↔ Ajaccio	12 hours on average	Piana	On alternate day
Marseille ↔ Porto Vecchio	12 hours on average	Girolata	On alternate day
Marseille ↔ Tanger Med	40 hours on average	Massalia	2x weekly

== Fleet ==
La Méridionale has three ro-pax ferries operated under the French flag.

Image	Ship	Flag	Built	Entered service	Gross tonnage	Length	Beam	Passengers	Vehicles	Service speed	Current status
	Massalia	(France)	1992	2025	27,542 GT	161 m	26 m	1,700	492	20.5 knots	In service
	Girolata	(France)	1995	2002	28,417 GT	177,30 m	27 m	650	160	23 knots	In service
	Piana	(France)	2011	2011	42,180 GT	180 m	30,5 m	750	200	24 knots	In service

== Other companies ==
- Corsica Ferries
- Corsica Linéa
- Moby Lines
