= MS Cruise Ausonia =

High-speed cruise ferry

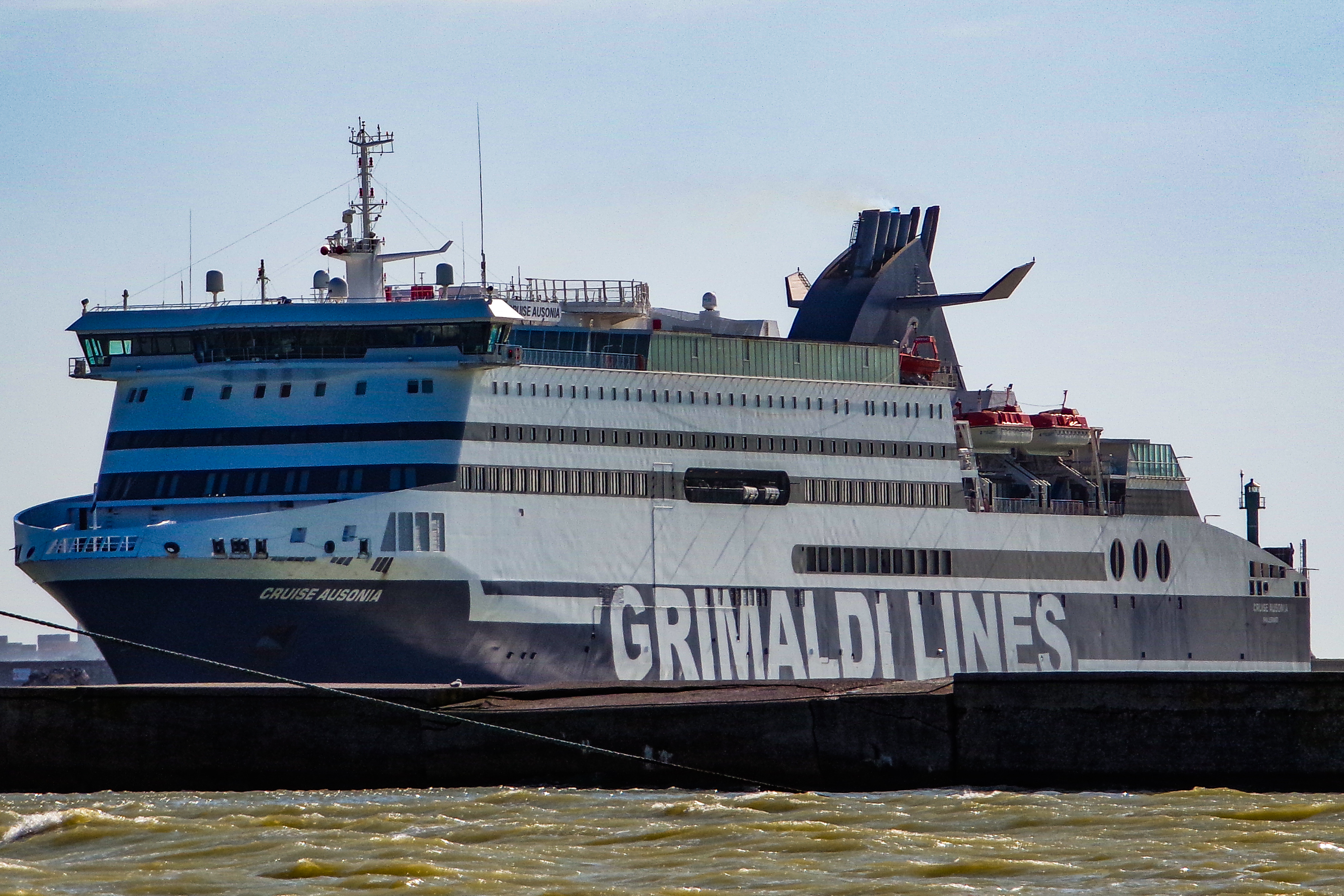
- Cruise Ausonia berthed in Livorno

History
- Name: Superfast XII (2002–2018); Cruise Ausonia (2018 – present)
- Owner: Attica Group (2002-2018); Grimaldi Group 2018-present
- Operator: Superfast Ferries 2002-2018; Grimaldi Lines 2018-present
- Port of registry: 2002–2018: Piraeus, Greece; 2018 onwards: Palermo, Italy
- Route: Livorno-Palermo
- Builder: Flender Werft, Germany
- Yard number: 683
- Laid down: 23 November 2000
- Launched: 7 December 2001
- Completed: 2 October 2002
- In service: 2002–present
- Identification: IMO number: 9227429; Call sign: SYCD; MMSI number: 239919000
- Status: In service

General characteristics
- Class & type: Superfast XI class fast ropax ferry
- Type: Ro-pax ferry
- Tonnage: 30,902 GT; 6,678 DWT
- Length: 200 m (660 ft)
- Beam: 25 m (82 ft)
- Draft: 6.40 m (21 ft 0 in)
- Decks: 10
- Installed power: 4 × Wärtsilä-Sulzer 12V46C diesels; combined 48000 kW
- Propulsion: 2 propellers; 2 bow thrusters; 1 stern thruster
- Speed: Service 28.6 knots (52.97 km/h; 32.91 mph)
- Capacity: 1639 passengers; 774 berths; 653 cars; 1920 Lane meters

Cruise Ausonia is a mixed passenger-cargo ship belonging to the Italian company Grimaldi Lines. Built between 2000 and 2002 by the Flender Werke shipyard in Lübeck for the Greek company Superfast Ferries, it was originally named Superfast XII (Greek: Σουπερφαστ XII, Souperfast XII). It entered service in October 2002, initially operating on routes between Greece and Italy, it was sold in 2017 to the Grimaldi Group and joined the Italian shipping company's fleet in 2018 under the name Cruise Ausonia. Used on routes between mainland Italy and Sardinia at first, it subsequently switched to serving Sicily from 2021.

== History ==
=== Origins and construction ===
In the early 2000s, Superfast Ferries still faced stiff competition from its rivals Minoan Lines and ANEK Lines on the routes between Greece and Italy. Since Superfast introduced its fast car ferries in 1995, the main operators in the Adriatic Sea had all equipped their fleets with similar vessels, first Minoan Lines in 1997 and then ANEK Lines in 2000. To remain competitive, Superfast had already renewed its fleet in 2001 with the impressive Superfast V and Superfast VI, which replaced the Superfast III and Superfast IV after only three years of service. With the aim of replacing the Superfast I and Superfast II, Superfast launched the construction of a fourth pair of ships.

Named Superfast XI and Superfast XII, the future ships are based on the four Superfast units planned for operation in Northern Europe. Despite a very similar appearance, they do have some differences, particularly in their superstructures and facilities, including the addition of a swimming pool, like the other Superfast ships operating in the Adriatic. Their capacity is virtually identical to that of the Superfast V and Superfast VI, as is their propulsion system, which retains the same specifications.

Built by the Flender Werke shipyards in Lübeck, the Superfast XII was laid down on 23 November 2000, and launched on 7 December 2001. After several months of finishing work, it was delivered to Superfast on 2 October 2002. The construction of the ship and its twin will, however, cause the Flender Werke shipyard to go bankrupt.

=== Service ===
==== Superfast Ferries (2002–2018) ====
After leaving Germany on 3 October 2002 to reach the Mediterranean, the Superfast XII was put into service on 12 October between Greece and Italy.

Starting from March 2009, it was transferred to the Crete service from Piraeus. It returned to sail in the Adriatic Sea between 2013 and 2015 before being assigned once again to the Aegean Sea, this time to serve the Cyclades and the Dodecanese.

On 16 June 2017, as the Superfast XII was preparing to leave Piraeus, an unknown person issued a warning about a booby-trapped package supposedly on board the ship. The announcement immediately triggered the intervention of the authorities and the evacuation of the vessel. However, this warning turned out to be false, and the Superfast XII left Piraeus more than an hour and a half late.

In October, Superfast Ferries decided not to renew its Aegean routes for 2018. The Superfast XII was then sold to the Italian company Grimaldi Lines. It completed its last crossing under the Greek flag on 18 May 2018.

==== Grimaldi Lines (since 2018) ====
After a brief period at the Perama shipyards, the ship was delivered to Grimaldi Lines. Renamed Cruise Ausonia, it entered service between mainland Italy and Sardinia in June 2018. In order not to delay its entry into service, the ship retains the characteristic red hull of Superfast during the summer season, on which the logos of the Greek company are replaced by those of Grimaldi.

On 28 October, while crossing from Palermo, Sicily, to Livorno, a fire broke out in the engine room around 3:00 a.m. off the island of Ustica. The 262 passengers were immediately awakened by the crew and led to assembly points, equipped with their life jackets. While the crew managed to extinguish the blaze, the captain started the remaining engine to return to Palermo. Two Italian Coast Guard patrol boats, one from the marine fire brigade, and the Grandi Navi Veloci ferry Majestic escorted the Cruise Ausonia back to Sicily, as the sirocco wind hampered progress and slowed the ship. The Cruise Ausonia finally reached Palermo later that morning. Taken to Genoa for repairs, the ship was also fitted with a fume cleaning system, commonly known as scrubbers, to reduce its sulfur emissions. It was also repainted in Grimaldi Lines colours.

== Facilities ==
The Cruise Ausonia has 9 decks. Although the ship actually spans 11 decks, the non-existent decks 4 and 6 are still counted, and their absence does not create a discrepancy in the deck numbering. Passenger quarters occupy all of decks 7 and 8 and part of decks 9 and 10. The crew is housed on the forward section of deck 9. Decks 3 and 5 are entirely dedicated to the car deck, as are the forward sections of decks 1 and 2.

=== Common areas ===
Originally used on a relatively long route, the Cruise Ausonia is equipped accordingly in terms of passenger facilities. On deck 7, passengers have access to two dining areas (à la carte and buffet), three bars (lounge bar, nightclub bar, and brasserie bar), as well as a shop and a casino. A lido bar with a swimming pool is also located on deck 10 in the center of the ship.

=== Cabins ===
The Cruise Ausonia has 198 cabins located on decks 8 and 9 towards the front of the ship. With a capacity of two to four people, all are equipped with full bathrooms including shower, toilet and sink.

== Features ==
The Cruise Ausonia is 199.90 meters long and 25 meters wide, with a gross tonnage of 30,902 GT. The ship has a capacity of 1,427 passengers and a 1,900-meter-long garage that can accommodate 653 vehicles on four levels, as well as 130 trailers. The garage is accessible via two ramp doors located at the stern. The Cruise Ausonia is powered by four Wärtsilä-Sulzer 12V46C diesel engines, each producing 48,000 kW of power, driving two propellers and propelling the vessel at a speed of 28.6 knots. The ship carries four large lifeboats, a rigid inflatable rescue boat, and several life rafts.

== Routes served ==
For Superfast Ferries, the Superfast XI initially operated routes between Greece and Italy on the Patras - Igoumenitsa - Corfu - Italy route. Transferred in 2009 to routes to Crete between Piraeus and Heraklion, it returned to the Greek-Italian service from 2013 to 2015. It then sailed between Piraeus and the Cyclades and Dodecanese archipelagos, primarily to the islands of Syros, Patmos, Leros, Kos, and Rhodes, from 2015 to 2018.

Since 2018, the Cruise Ausonia has sailed on the Grimaldi Lines routes. Initially used primarily on routes to Sardinia between Civitavecchia and Olbia, it is now also based in Sicily, serving Palermo, first from Livorno and then from Naples. In October 2022, it was also deployed on the now suspended link connecting Italy, Spain and Morocco on the Savona - Barcelona - Tangier line.
