= List of ship launches in 2000 =

The list of ship launches in 2000 includes a chronological list of all ships launched in 2000.

Date	Ship	Class / type	Builder	Location	Country	Notes
18 January	Aurora	Cruise ship	Meyer Werft	Papenburg	Germany	For P&O Cruises
29 January	Pililaau	Bob Hope-class vehicle cargo ship	Northrop Grumman Ship Systems	Avondale, Louisiana	United States	
29 January	Annegret	Sietas type 161	J.J. Sietas	Hamburg-Neuenfelde	Germany	For SAL Heavy Lift
3 February	E.R. Pusan	Samsung 5500-class container ship	Samsung Heavy Industries	Goeje	South Korea	
4 February	Cornelius Mærsk	S-class container ship	Odense Staalskibsvaerft	Lindø	Denmark	For Maersk Line
20 February	Farnella	Fishing trawler	Appledore Shipbuilders Ltd.	Appledore	United Kingdom	For Jacinta Ltd.
9 March	E.R. Seoul	Samsung 5500-class container ship	Samsung Heavy Industries	Goeje	South Korea	
8 April	De Zeven Provinciën	De Zeven Provinciën-class frigate	Koninklijke Schelde Groep	Flushing	Netherlands	
1 May	Maersk Wind	Vehicle transporter	Tsuneishi Holdings Corporation	Nakatado District, Kagawa	Japan	For A P Møller, Singapore
6 May	St Albans	Type 23 frigate	BAE Systems Naval Ships (YSL)	Glasgow	United Kingdom	
6 May	Stena Hollandica	Seapacer-class RoPax-ferry	Astilleros Españoles	Puerto Real	Spain	For Stena Line
12 May	Talwar	Talwar-class frigate	Baltic Shipyard	St. Petersburg	Russia	For Indian Navy
19 May	Olympic Explorer	Voyager-class cruise ship	Blohm + Voss	Hamburg	Germany	For Royal Olympic Cruises
24 May	Paula	Sietas type 161	J.J. Sietas	Hamburg-Neuenfelde	Germany	For SAL Heavy Lift
1 June	Vapper	Vapper-class gunboat	BLRT Grupp	Tallinn	Estonia	For Estonian Border Guard
4 June	E.R. London	Samsung 5500-class container ship	Samsung Heavy Industries	Goeje	South Korea	
17 June	Parramatta	Anzac-class frigate	Tenix Defence Systems	Williamstown, Victoria	Australia	
21 June	Bulkeley	Arleigh Burke-class destroyer	Ingalls Shipbuilding	Pascagoula, Mississippi	United States	
29 June	Wiebke	Sietas type 161	J.J. Sietas	Hamburg-Neuenfelde	Germany	For SAL Heavy Lift
2 July	McCampbell	Arleigh Burke-class destroyer	Bath Iron Works	Bath, Maine	United States	
7 July	E.R. Amsterdam	Samsung 5500-class container ship	Samsung Heavy Industries	Goeje	South Korea	
28 July	Watkins	Watson-class vehicle cargo ship	National Steel and Shipbuilding Company	San Diego, California	United States	
29 July	E.R. Felixtone	Samsung 5500-class container ship	Samsung Heavy Industries	Goeje	South Korea	
2 August	Hebrides	Ferry	Ferguson Shipbuilders	Port Glasgow	United Kingdom	For Caledonian MacBrayne
12 August	Prometheus	Ferry	Geoje	Samsung Heavy Industries	South Korea	For Minoan Lines
1 September	Ulysses	Ferry	Rauma	Aker Finnyards	Finland	For Irish Ferries
3 September	E.R. Berlin	Samsung 5500-class container ship	Samsung Heavy Industries	Goeje	South Korea	
5 September	Sealand Illinois	Sealand-New-York-type container ship	Ulsan	Hyundai Heavy Industries	South Korea	For Costamare Shipping
6 September	Celebrity Infinity	Millennium-class cruise ship	Saint Nazaire	ALSTOM Chantiers de l'Atlantique	France	For Celebrity Cruises
9 September	Alexandra	Type Stocznia Gdynia 8184-container ship	Stocznia Gdynia	Gdynia	Poland	
25 September	Akebono	Murasame-class destroyer			Japan	
29 September	Pride of Rotterdam	Cruiseferry	Fincantieri Marghera Yard	Venice, Italy	Italy	For P&O Ferries
29 September	Wave Knight	Wave-class tanker	BAE Systems Marine	Barrow-in-Furness	United Kingdom	For Royal Fleet Auxiliary.
16 October	Ariake	Murasame-class destroyer			Japan	
27 October	Aries	Stocznia Gdynia 8138-type container ship	Stocznia Gdynia	Gdynia	Poland	For Alpha Ship
31 October	Álvaro de Bazán	Álvaro de Bazán-class frigate	Navatia	Ferrol	Spain	For Armada Española
4 November	E.R. Lübeck	VW 2500-type container ship	Volkswerft Stralsund	Stralsund	Germany	
10 November	Hunzedijk		Tille Scheepsbouw Kootstertille BV	Kootstertille	Netherlands	
11 November	Brittin	Bob Hope-class vehicle cargo ship	Northrop Grumman Ship Systems	Avondale, Louisiana	United States	
18 November	Superfast VII	Ro-Pax ferry	Howaldtswerke-Deutsche Werft	Kiel	Germany	For Superfast Ferries
18 November	Morgenstond III	Cargo ship	Ferus Smit B.V	Westerbroek	Netherlands	For C.V. Scheepvaartonderneming Morgenstond III
18 November	Superfast IX	Ro-Pax ferry	Howaldtswerke-Deutsche Werft	Kiel	Germany	For Superfast Ferries
18 November	Cap San Nicolas	Cap-San-class container ship	Samsung Heavy Industries	Geoje	South Korea	For Hamburg Süd
22 November	Shoup	Arleigh Burke-class destroyer	Ingalls Shipbuilding	Pascagoula, Mississippi	United States	
24 November	Trishul	Talwar-class frigate	Baltic Shipyard	St. Petersburg	Russia	For Indian Navy
26 November	APL England	Samsung 5500-class container ship	Samsung Heavy Industries	Goeje	South Korea	
27 November	Isoshio	Oyashio-class submarine			Japan	
28 November	Superfast VIII	Ro-Pax ferry	Howaldtswerke-Deutsche Werft	Kiel	Germany	For Superfast Ferries
1 December	Trade Freda	container ship	Hyundai Heavy Industries	Ulsan	South Korea	For Hansa Mare Reederei
22 December	Vega	Stocznia Gdynia 8138-type container ship	Stocznia Gdynia	Gdynia	Poland	For Alpha Ship
Unknown date	Aine Christina	Fishing trawler	Arklow Marine Services Inc.	Arklow	Ireland	For Aine & Patrick Deasy Jr.
Unknown date	BBC Kusan	Ro-ro cargo ship			Russia	
Unknown date	Glomar Jack Ryan	Drillship	Harland & Wolff	Belfast	United Kingdom	For Global Marine Ltd.
Unknown date	Netley	Naval tender	Aluminium Shipbuilders Ltd.	Fishbourne	United Kingdom	For Royal Maritime Auxiliary Service.
Unknown date	Newhaven	Naval tender	Aluminium Shipbuilders Ltd.	Fishbourne	United Kingdom	For Royal Maritime Auxiliary Service.
Unknown date	Nutbourne	Naval tender	Aluminium Shipbuilders Ltd.	Fishbourne	United Kingdom	For Royal Maritime Auxiliary Service.
Unknown date	Padstow	Naval tender	Aluminium Shipbuilders Ltd.	Fishbourne	United Kingdom	For Royal Maritime Auxiliary Service.
Unknown date	Shannon Breeze	Ferry	Appledore Shipbuilders Ltd.	Appledore	United Kingdom	For Shannon Car Ferry Ltd.
Unknown date	Stavros S Niarchos	Barquentine	Appledore Shipbuilders Ltd.	Appledore	United Kingdom	For Tall Ships Youth Trust.
