= MS Superfast I =

MS Superfast I may refer:

- MS Superfast I (1995) in service under this name 1995–2004; later Eurostar Roma, now Skania
- Superfast I (2008) in service under this name 2008–present; Built as Froza but sold and renamed before completion.
