= Europa Palace =

High-speed cruise ferry

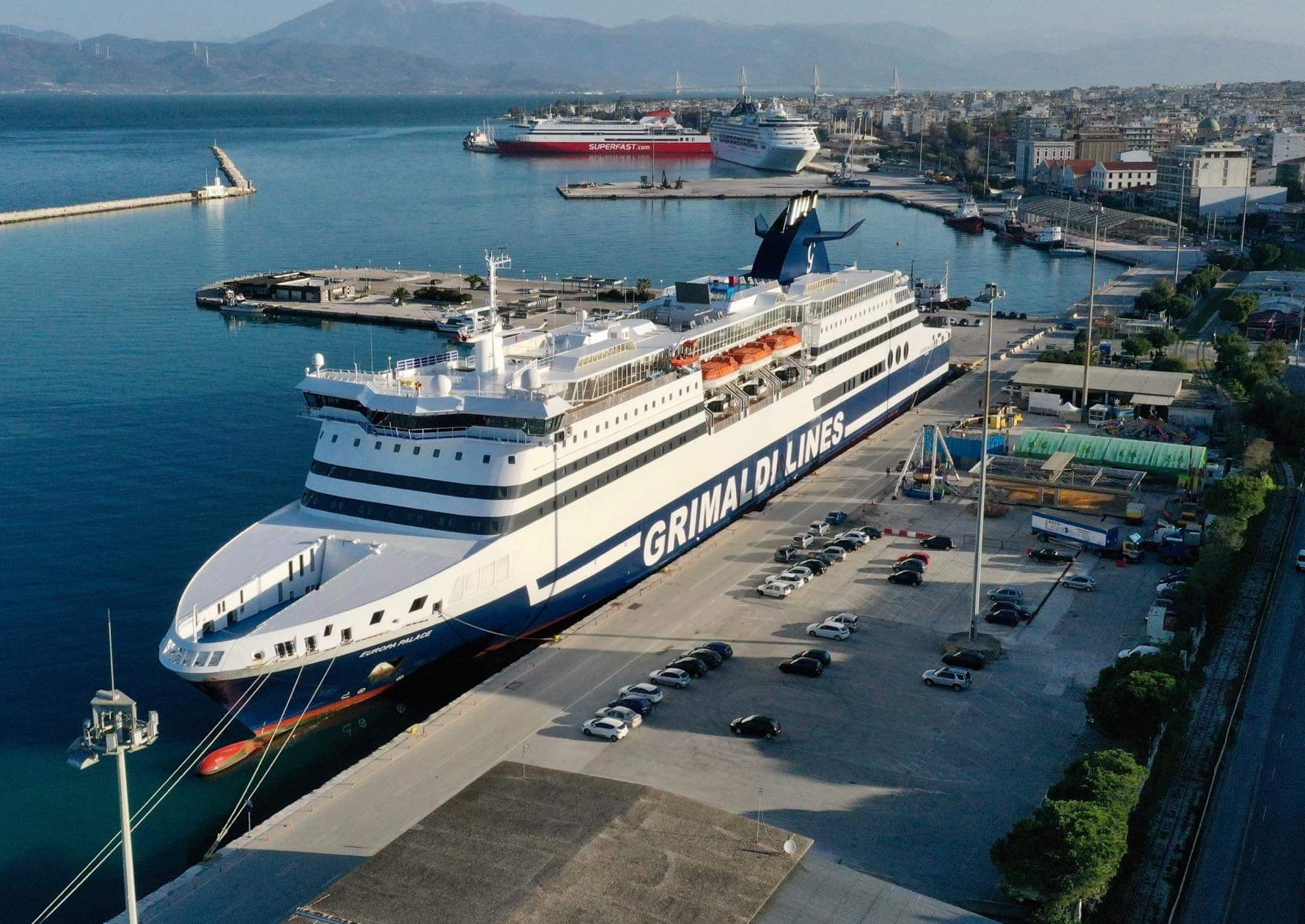
- Europa Palace

History
- Name: 2001–2013: Superfast VI; 2013–2016: Bimini Superfast; 2016–2021: Cruise Olbia; 2021-present: Europa Palace
- Owner: 2001–2013: Superfast Ferries; 2013–2016: Bimini Superfast Ltd; 2016–present: Grimaldi Euromed SPA
- Operator: 2001–2013: Superfast Ferries; 2013–2016:Genting USA Ltd; 2016–2021: Grimaldi Lines; 2021-present: Minoan Grimaldi Lines
- Port of registry: Patras, Greece 2001-2013; 2013–2016: Panama, Panama; 2016 – present: Palermo, Italy
- Route: 2001–2013: Patras–Igoumenitsa–Ancona; 2013–2016: Miami–Bimini; 2016–2021: Civitavecchia–Olbia; 2021-present: Patras-Ancona; present: Naples-Cagliari and Naples-Palermo
- Builder: HDW, Kiel, Germany
- Yard number: 356
- Launched: 11 March 2000
- Acquired: 6 February 2001
- Maiden voyage: 2 March 2001
- In service: 2 March 2001
- Identification: IMO number: 9198939; Call sign: IBNB; MMSI number: 247362700
- Status: In Service

General characteristics (as built)
- Class & type: Superfast V class fast ropax ferry
- Tonnage: 32,728 GT; 6,420 t DWT
- Length: 203.90 m (669 ft 0 in)
- Beam: 25 m (82 ft 0 in)
- Height: 40.0
- Draught: 6.80 m (22 ft 4 in)
- Decks: 10
- Installed power: 4 × Wärtsilä-Sulzer NSD ZA V40S diesels; combined 46000 kW
- Propulsion: 2 propellers; 3 bow thrusters; 1 stern thruster
- Speed: Service 28.9 knots (53.52 km/h; 33.26 mph)
- Capacity: 1,608 passengers; 842 berths; 712 cars; 1,926 Lane meters

Europa Palace is a fast ropax ferry owned by Grimaldi Lines and operated by Minoan Grimaldi Lines. The ship previously named Cruise Olbia and did the Civitavecchia-Olbia route. Built in 2001 as Superfast VI by Howaldtswerke-Deutsche Werft (HDW) in Kiel, Germany for Attica Group's subsidiary Superfast Ferries, she was sold to the Genting Group in 2013, Renamed Bimini Superfast for the Bimini-Miami route. In 2016 she was sold to her current owners.

== Concept and construction ==
Superfast VI was built at HDW in Kiel for Superfast Ferries' Adriatic Sea services, along with sister ship Superfast V. She was the second ship in the third pair of ropax ferries built for Superfast Ferries from various ship yards in Northern Europe. She was ordered in July 1998, alongside sister ship Superfast V and another pair for Baltic sea services, Superfast VII and Superfast VIII She was launched from dry dock on 11 March 2000 and was due to be delivered at the end of July 2000, but after many months of delays due to technical problems, she was delivered to Superfast Ferries on 6 February 2001. After many months of delays due to technical problems, Howaldtswerke-Deutsche Werft was forced to pay hefty penalties due to the late delivery.

== Service history ==
=== 2001-2013: Superfast VI ===
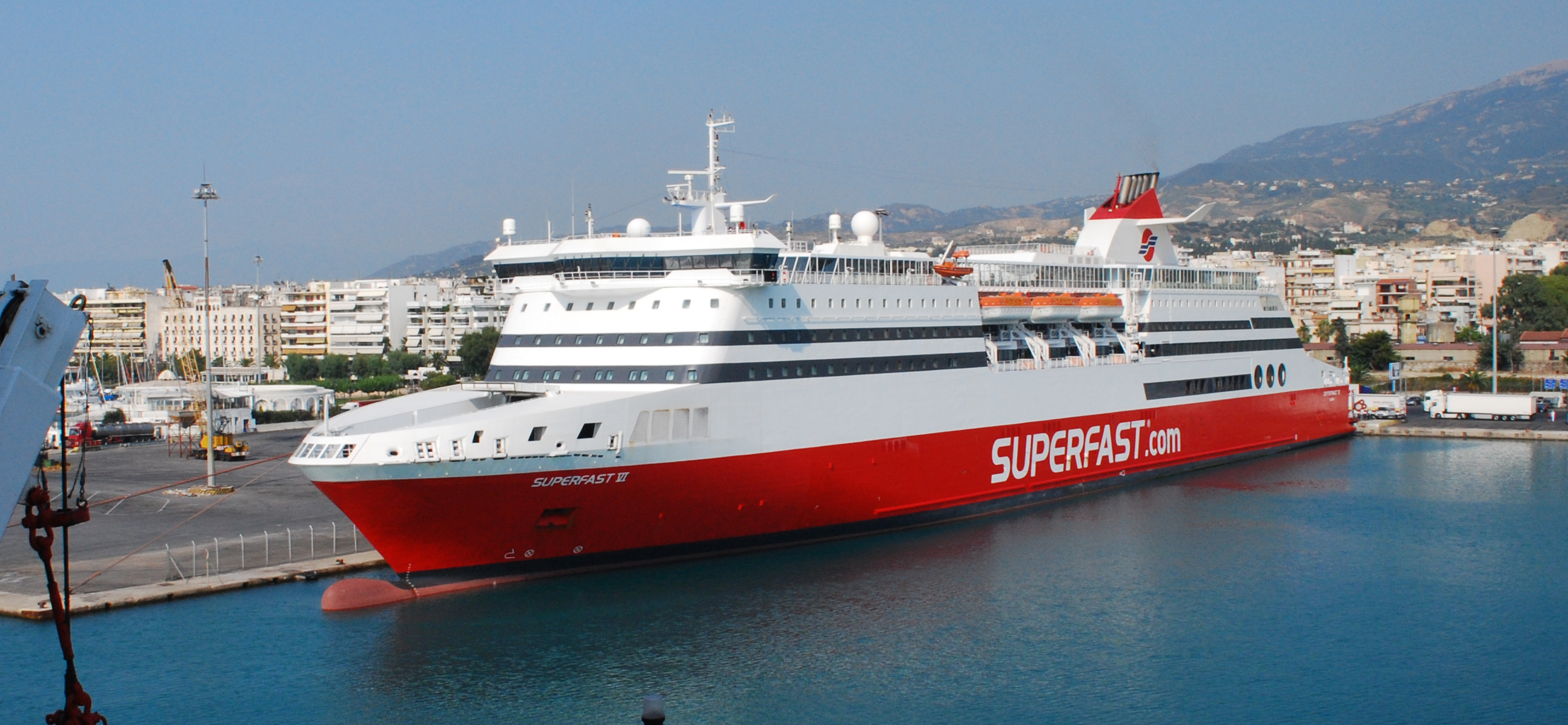
Superfast VI in Patras, Greece in August 2009

Superfast VI entered service on 2 March 2001 on Superfast Ferries Patras—Igoumenitsa-Ancona route. In March 2013 Superfast VI was sold to Genting Group, she was handed over to her new owners on 6 April 2013.

=== 2013-2016: Bimini Superfast ===
After Genting Group took over their new ship, she was renamed Bimini Superfast. She departed Patras and sailed to Málaga in Spain for remodeling. After a few weeks she departed Málaga and sailed to USA for final fitting out works to be completed. Bimini Superfast was due to begin service with the Bimini cruise from Miami on 6 June 2013 but the United States Coast Guard did not give approval for the ship to sail in US waters. This was due to deficiencies with the crew and the ship, even though it had been sailing in Europe for many years with no compliance issues. After several weeks of work, the US Coast Guard gave Bimini Superfast final clearance to sail. On 20 June 2013 she finally made her first crossing from Miami to Bimini.

Bimini Superfast operated two and three night cruises from Miami. They depart Miami at 7pm, spend two or three nights at Bimini and returns to Miami at 1pm on the third or fourth day. Passengers are required to have passports if staying on the Island but this is not required if lodging on the ship. The 50 mile trip to Bimini Island takes about 3 hours. With the completion of the pier in Bimini Bay as of 18 September 2014 passengers are no longer tendered by ferry from the ship to the island. Passengers disembark directly on the island from the cruise ship, saving about 60 minutes of ferry time each way. Once in Bimini, passengers disembark to visit Resorts World Bimini Bay Resort and Casino via a free tram.

Part of the business plan of Genting for the Bimini Superfast was to carry out evening gambling and party cruises to nowhere, but due to visa issues with the hotel staff being foreign nationals, the US government has ruled that they can no longer offer these cruises, as the passengers never set foot in another country. As a consequence Bimini Superfast completed her last cruise to nowhere on 28 November 2013. However the Bimini Superfast ceased operating on 10 January 2016 after only 3 years of operation. Genting announced in January 2016 of its plans to cease the service from Florida to Bimini, it was sold to Grimaldi Lines of Italy.

=== 2016-2021: Cruise Olbia ===
In January Grimaldi Lines announced the purchase of the Bimini Superfast, to be placed on Livorno-Olbia route, replacing the Zeus Palace, which will be placed on the Civitavecchia-Olbia route.

=== 2021-onwards: Europa Palace ===
In February 2021 Grimaldi Lines announced that Cruise Olympia and Cruise Europa would be transferred to Grimaldi Group and will make Civitavecchia-Olbia route. The former Cruise Olbia will be replace the first Cruise in the Adriatic route under the name Europa Palace and will be operate by Grimaldi Minoan Lines. The ship left her route for Naples where its name will change to Europa Palace.
