= GNV Spirit =

Ferry operated by GNV

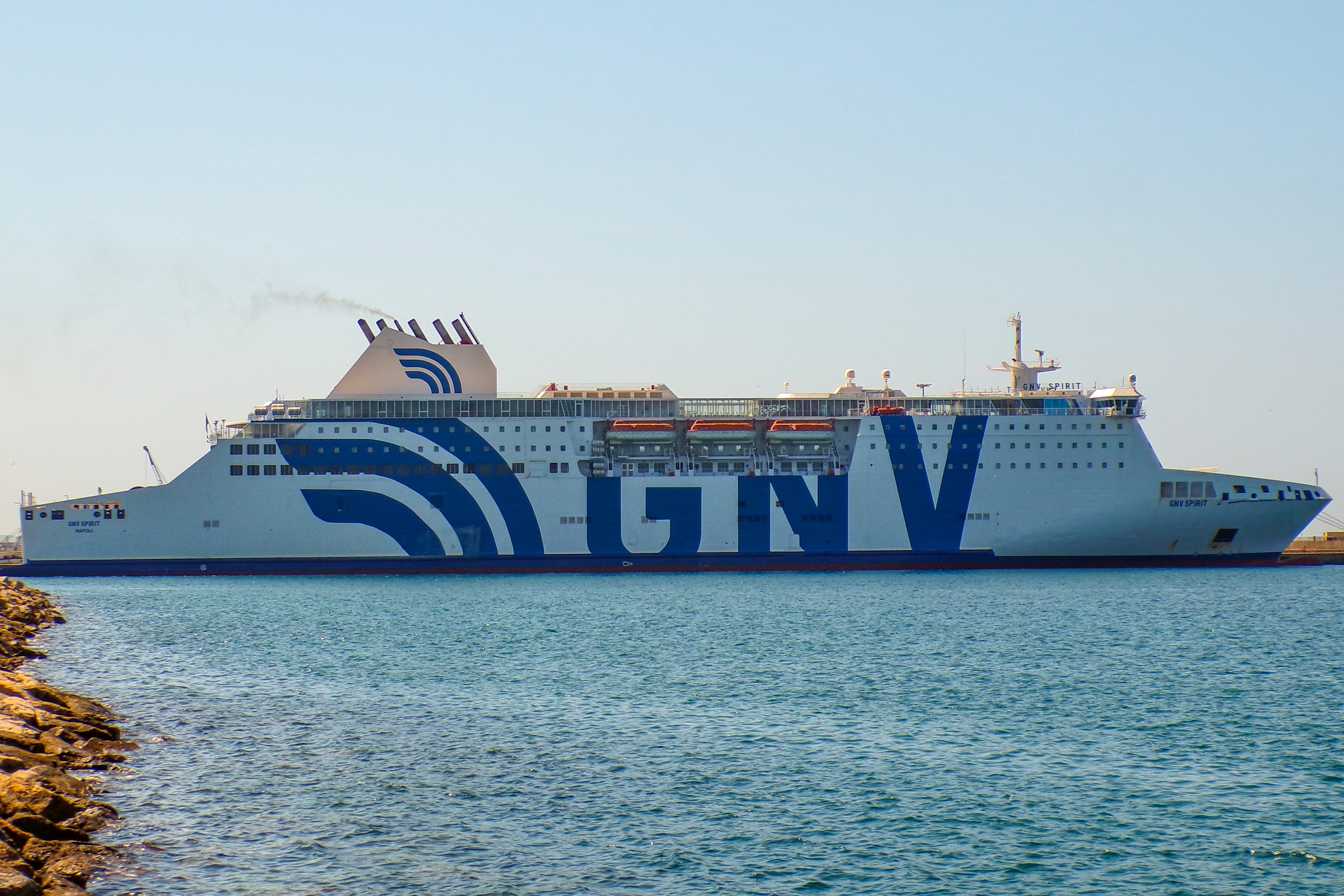
- GNV Spirit in Porto Torres

History
- Name: GNV Spirit (2022–present); Cap Finistère (2010-2022); Superfast V (2001–2010)
- Owner: Grandi Navi Veloci (2022–present); Brittany Ferries (2010–2022); Attica Group (2001–2010)
- Operator: Grandi Navi Veloci (2022–present); Brittany Ferries (2010–2022); Superfast Ferries (2001–2010)
- Port of registry: Cyprus, Cyprus (2022–present) Morlaix, France (2010–2022)
- Builder: Howaldtswerke-Deutsche Weft AG, Kiel, Germany
- Launched: 11 March 2000
- In service: 2010
- Identification: IMO number: 9198927; Call sign: FLSO; MMSI number: 226318000
- Status: In service

General characteristics (as built)
- Tonnage: 32,728 GT
- Length: 203.90 m (669 ft 0 in)
- Beam: 25 m (82 ft 0 in)
- Draught: 6.4 m (21 ft 0 in)
- Speed: 28 knots (52 km/h; 32 mph)
- Capacity: 1,608 passengers (maximum); 790 passengers (operating); 842 berths; 712 cars; 1,926 lane meters

GNV Spirit is a cruiseferry owned by GNV (Grandi Navi Veloci) and operated by GNV between the Tyrrhenian Sea and Spain. She was acquired in 2022 by Grandi Navi Veloci from Brittany Ferries for an undisclosed amount.

== SECA 2015 refit ==
On 1 January 2015, the European Union (including the North Sea, English Channel, Eastern side of the Western Channel and Baltic Sea) had a sulphur in marine fuel cut from the allowance in 2014 of 1% to 0.1% of sulphur allowed, Brittany Ferries then announced in January 2014 that they were going to fit scrubbers to a number of elder vessels, convert newer vessels to liquified natural gas (LNG) and construct a new LNG-powered ferry but Brittany Ferries later withdrew and cancelled the order and the LNG conversions, instead they announced that all vessels were to have scrubbers systems fitted. Normandie was the first vessel in the fleet to have these installed at the Astillero shipyard in Santander in late 2014 re-entering service in January 2015. Cap Finistère sailed from Portsmouth to Santander on 11 January 2015 with a commercial sailing, before proceeding to the shipyard for refit and installation of scrubber technology which will also necessitate a new funnel arrangement. After the re-entry into service of Cap Finistère on 24 March 2015 with the 10:30 sailing from Bilbao (Zierbena) to Portsmouth, she was followed into the shipyard by Barfleur in March returning to service in May 2015.

== Brief history ==
Superfast V was built at HDW in Kiel for Superfast Ferries' Adriatic Sea services, Patras—Igoumenitsa-Ancona along with her sister ship Superfast VI. She was the first ship in the third pair of Ropax ferries built for Superfast Ferries from various ship yards in Northern Europe. She was ordered in July 1998, alongside sister ship Superfast VI and another pair for Baltic Sea service, Superfast VII and Superfast VIII In March 2010 Brittany Ferries purchased the ship from Attica Group for €82 million to expand Spanish services.

Cap Finistère was delivered to Brittany Ferries under her new name in February 2010. During October 2010 she conducted berthing trials in Cherbourg and Portsmouth before heading for work to be completed in Dunkerque prior to entering service running Portsmouth to Cherbourg as her first route eventually running a Portsmouth to Bilbao route with occasional stops to Roscoff Santander and Plymouth. In early 2022, GNV bought the 'Cap Finistère' from Brittany Ferries for an undisclosed amount. The vessel was renamed GNV Spirit and serves in the Mediterranean Sea.

== Current routes ==
GNV Spirit currently operates the current routes.

- Barcelona <> Palma de Mallorca
- Valencia <> Palma de Mallorca

== Routes for Brittany Ferries ==
- Portsmouth <> Bilbao (Via Roscoff)
- Portsmouth <> Santander
- Portsmouth <> Cherbourg-Octeville
- Roscoff (For crew change)
