= Superfast XI =

Ferry

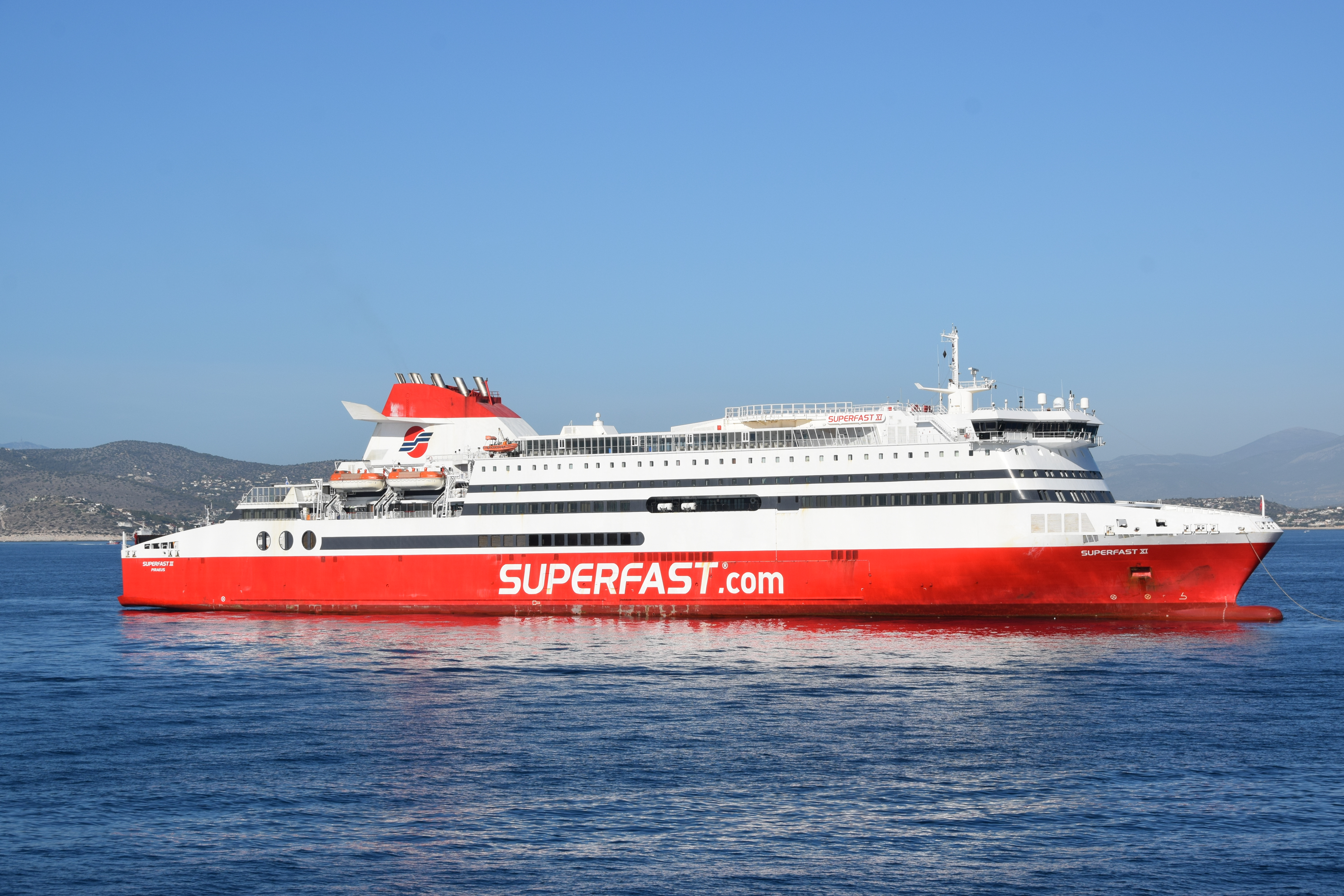
- Superfast XI underway

History
- Name: Superfast XI
- Owner: Attica Group
- Operator: Superfast Ferries
- Port of registry: Piraeus, Greece
- Builder: Flender Werft, Germany
- Yard number: 682
- Laid down: 20 September 2000
- Launched: 3 August 2001
- Completed: 10 July 2002
- In service: 2002–present
- Identification: IMO number: 9227417; Call sign: SYCF; MMSI number: 239918000
- Status: In service

General characteristics
- Class & type: Superfast XI class fast ropax ferry
- Type: Ro-pax ferry
- Tonnage: 30,902 GT; 6,678 DWT
- Length: 200 m (660 ft)
- Beam: 25 m (82 ft)
- Draft: 6.40 m (21 ft 0 in)
- Decks: 10
- Installed power: 4 × Wärtsilä 12V46C diesels; combined 48000 kW
- Propulsion: 2 propellers; 2 bow thrusters; 1 stern thruster
- Speed: Service 28.6 knots (52.97 km/h; 32.91 mph)
- Capacity: 1427 passengers; 774 berths; 653 cars; 1920 Lane meters

Superfast XI is a fast jumbo ropax ferry currently operating between Patras-Igoumenitsa and Ancona under Superfast Ferries. She was built in 2002 by the Howaldtswerke-Deutsche Werft (HDW) at Kiel, Germany for Attica Group's wholly owned subsidiary Superfast Ferries.

== Concept and construction ==
The Superfast XI is the first ship in a pair of fast ferries built by HDW for Superfast Ferries' Adriatic Sea services. It was launched on 3 August 2001, and delivered to its owners on 10 July 2002. Its sister ship is Superfast XII, which was deployed on the same route. Superfast XI is the 11th in a series of 12 similar ferries built for Superfast ferries at various ship yards in Northern Europe.

== Service history ==
The Superfast XI entered service for Superfast Ferries on 20 July 2002 on the Patras-Igoumenitsa-Ancona route, and has remained on this route since.

The ship was also used for a British children's show called Me Too!, which aired between 2006 and 2008 and was used as part of some episodes.

== Accidents and Incidents ==
On 28 October 2021, during the midday hours, a fire broke out on board on the vessels funnel while it was at the port of Patras. The fire is estimated to have originated from a pipe located in a compartment directly above the ship's garage deck. Hellenic Coast Guard patrol boats, shore-based Fire Service units, and safety tugboats immediately deployed to the scene. The fire was successfully extinguished, and no injuries to the crew or marine pollution were reported.

The Patras Port Authority issued a detention order for the vessel until the Local Ship Inspection Team could assess the damage and its classification society issued a certificate maintaining its class.
