= Athena Seaways =

Ferry built in 2007

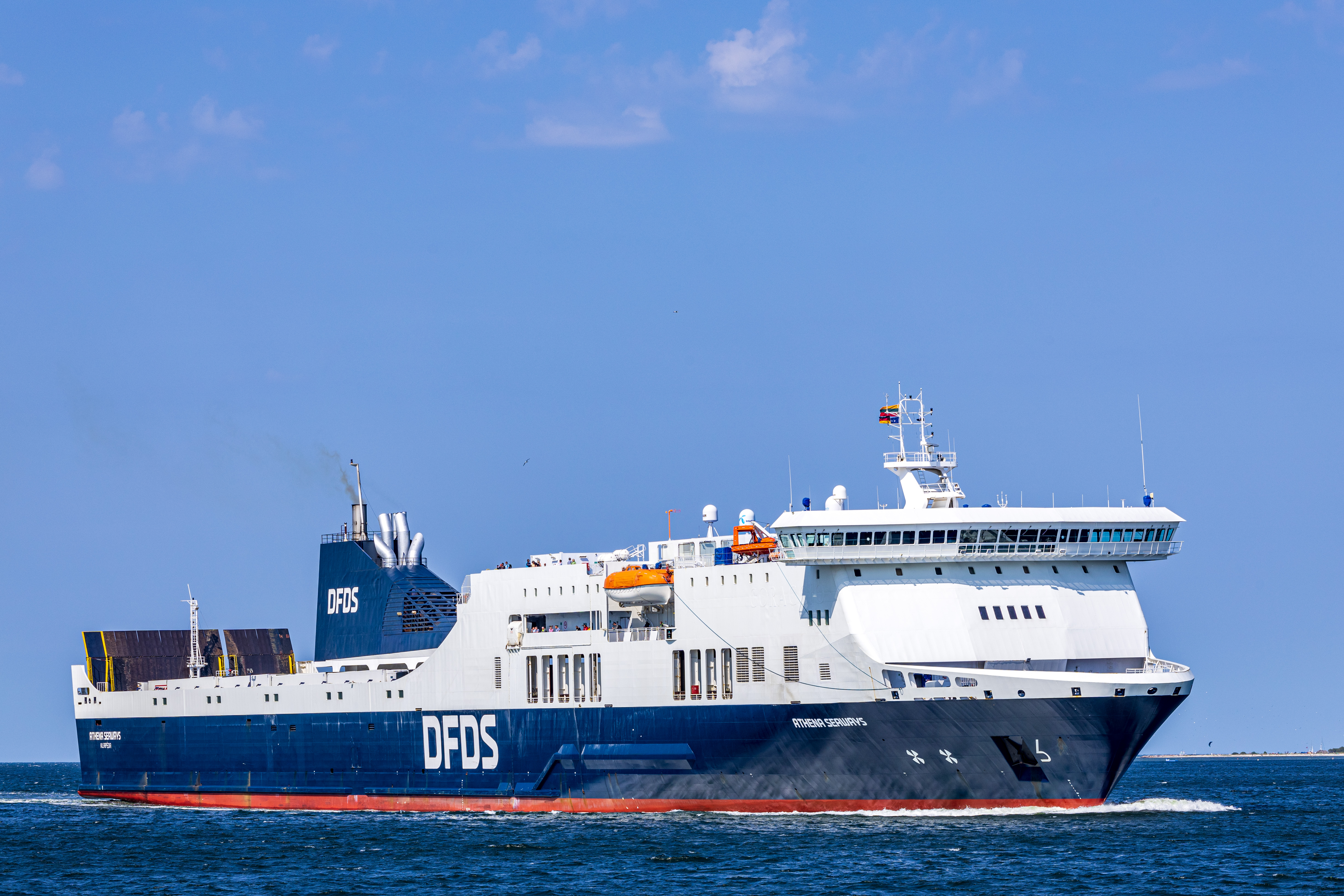
- Athena Seaways in Kiel

History
- Name: (2007–2013): Coraggio; (2013–present): Athena Seaways
- Owner: (2007–2013): Grimaldi Holding S.p.A.; (2013–present): DFDS A/S / DFDS Seaways Lithuania
- Operator: (2007–2010): GNV (charter); (2010): Acciona Trasmediterránea (charter); (2010–2011): Stena Line (charter); (2012–2013): Grimaldi Lines / Minoan Lines (charter); (2013–present): DFDS Seaways
- Port of registry: (2007–2013): Palermo, Italy; (2013–present): Klaipėda, Lithuania
- Route: Dunkerque – Rosslare; Former: Karlshamn – Klaipėda; Former: Kiel – Klaipėda
- Ordered: 2004
- Builder: Nuovi Cantieri Apuania; Marina di Carrara, Italy
- Yard number: 1237
- Laid down: 2005
- Launched: 24 November 2006
- Completed: 29 March 2007
- Acquired: 29 March 2007 (by Grimaldi Holding) December 2013 (by DFDS Seaways)
- Maiden voyage: April 2007
- In service: 2007
- Identification: IMO number: 9350680; Call sign: LYAC; MMSI number: 277504000
- Status: In service

General characteristics
- Class & type: Coraggio Class Ro-Pax Ferry (Lead ship)
- Tonnage: 26,141 GT; 8,500 DWT
- Length: 199.14 m (653 ft 4 in)
- Beam: 26.60 m (87 ft 3 in)
- Draught: 6.40 m (21 ft 0 in)
- Depth: 9.60 m (31 ft 6 in)
- Decks: 8
- Ramps: Stern vehicle loading ramps
- Installed power: 2 × Wärtsilä 12V46 marine diesel engines (total 24,000 kW / 32,616 hp)
- Propulsion: 2 × controllable pitch propellers
- Speed: 24.0 knots (44.4 km/h; 27.6 mph) (service) / 25.0 knots (46.3 km/h; 28.8 mph) (max)
- Capacity: 1,000 passengers (114 cabins / 414 beds, 116 reclining seats); 600 cars / 2,623 lane metres for freight
- Crew: 45

Athena Seaways is a 199.14-metre Ro-Pax cruise ferry owned and operated by DFDS Seaways. Built in 2007 by Nuovi Cantieri Apuania in Marina di Carrara, Italy, she is the lead ship of the Coraggio-class series. Originally commissioned for Grimaldi Holding as Coraggio, she was chartered to several Mediterranean and North Sea operators—including Grandi Navi Veloci (GNV), Trasmediterránea, Stena Line, and Grimaldi Lines—before joining DFDS Seaways in late 2013. Renamed Athena Seaways and registered in Klaipėda, Lithuania, she is powered by twin Wärtsilä 12V46 diesel engines generating 24,000 kW and operates across DFDS's Baltic and Celtic Sea route networks.

== Service ==
The ferry, the lead ship of the Coraggio class, was launched on 24 November 2006 at the Nuovi Cantieri Apuania in Marina di Carrara with the name Coraggio and delivered on 29 March 2007 to Grimaldi Holding. In April 2007, it was chartered to GNV and entered service on the connections between Genoa, Valletta and Tunis. On 17 October 2007, it was transferred to the connections between Livorno and Palermo.

From 19 March to 25 May 2010, it was chartered to Trasmediterránea and operated on the routes between Valencia, Palma de Mallorca, Mahón and Ibiza as a replacement for its sister ship Audacia, which was out of service due to engine problems. After the charter ended, it was laid up in Genoa on 27 May 2010.

On 12 July 2010, she was bareboat chartered for 12 months to Stena Line and, after having undergone an extension of the passenger accommodations which had already affected the more recent sister ships and other adjustments necessary for the entry into service in Northern Europe, including the replacement of the two access ramps to the garages with a single one, she entered service on 30 September on the services between Hoek van Holland and Killingholme.

On 7 November 2011, the service for Stena Line ended and on 13 November Schiedam sails for Marina di Carrara, where it is decommissioned. From June to September 2012, it was chartered to Saremar and used on the connections between Vado Ligure and Porto Torres. Once the charter ended on 17 September 2012, it was laid up in Genoa.

In November 2012, it was chartered to Anek Lines and, transferred under the flag of the Greek company, it started service on 15 November on the connections between Patras, Igoumenitsa and Venice.

In November 2013, the charter to Anek Lines ended and the vessel was laid up in Genoa. In the same month it was chartered to DFDS for five years, already owner of the sister ships Victoria Seaways and Regina Seaways, starting from January 2014.

On 3 December 2013, she was renamed Athena Seaways and, having hoisted the Lithuanian flag, she began service in the same month on the routes between Klaipėda, Kiel and Karlshamn. In March 2015, she underwent refitting at the Remontowa shipyard in Gdańsk, during which smokestack scrubbers were installed.

On 31 May 2016, it was sold outright to DFDS. On 8 September 2023, she was transferred to the Dunkirk to Rosslare route, where she still operates today in tandem with Optima Seaways.

== Sister ships ==
- Forza
- Rizhao Orient
- Tenacia
- Superfast I
- Superfast II
- Victoria Seaways
- Regina Seaways
