= Pericles Panagopoulos =

Greek shipping magnate (1935–2019)

- Born: 29 December 1935
- Died: 5 February 2019 (aged 83)
- Occupation: Businessman
- Spouse: Katerina Nafplioti Panagopoulos
- Children: Alexander Panagopoulos; Irene Panagopoulos

Pericles Panagopoulos (29 December 1935 – 5 February 2019) was a Greek shipping magnate. He is considered to have been an institutor of the modern shipping industry, and the most successful Greek shipping magnate since Aristotle Onassis. He gained acclaim for having created three shipping business entities, in his lifetime. In 1989, he sold Royal Cruise Lines to Kloster for a reported US$300 million (US$607 million as converted in 2019). In 2007, he sold his Athens-based Attica Group for about US$404 million to Marfin Investment Group (MIG). He also owns Magna Marine Inc., a modern shipping company that owns and runs modern bulk carriers. His death was announced by his wife, on Facebook on February 5, 2019.

== Early life ==
Panagopoulos was born in a nursing home in Athens. His father built hotel Veto in Athens. The hotel was taken over by Nazi officers in WWII, during the Axis occupation of Greece. After five months of hospitalization, his father died, following a violent attack by the Nazi occupiers. Leaving the young Pericles and his two half-brothers to be brought up by his widowed mother from Constantinople.

== Career ==
In 1972, in partnership with Barney A. Ebsworth, he formed Royal Cruise Line. The m/s Golden Odyssey was the company's first cruise ship. Built in Helsingor Shipyard and delivered in 1974, she was designed to carry 450 passengers as this was the capacity of the 747 Jumbo Jet airplane. The company grew with the addition of the 850-passenger Royal Odyssey in 1982 and the 1000-passenger Crown Odyssey in 1988 before getting acquired by Kloster Cruises in 1989. In 1993, Pericles Panagopoulos co-founded with his son Alexander Panagopoulos, Superfast Ferries, as part of the Attica Group, an Athens-listed holding corporation.

In 2009, he was kidnapped by armed men in Athens. The kidnapping was orchestrated from prison by Greek crime boss Panagiotis Vlastos, who later made a failed attempt to escape prison, with a helicopter armed with improvised explosive devices and AK-47s.

His family paid a ransom of €30 million (approximately $39 million) to secure Panagopoulos's release. The ransom was reported by Greek police to be the highest ever paid.

== See also ==
- List of kidnappings
- List of solved missing person cases (post-2000)
