= Alexander Panagopoulos =

Alexander Panagopoulos is a Greek environmentalist and shipping entrepreneur. He is the chairman and chief executive officer of Arista Maritime Inc. He was previously elected as chairman of High Level Ferry Group of ECSA.

He is founder of Forward Ships, an environmental initiative to convert the maritime industry from bunker fuel to liquified natural gas.

In 2018, Panagopoulos received the "Most Sustainable Project" award for Forward Ships in Copenhagen at Maritime2020, and the GREEN4SEA Clean Shipping Award in Athens.

In 1993 he co-founded Superfast Ferries in Greece, along with his father Pericles Panagopoulos, and was the secretary-general of Greek Passenger Shipowners Association from 1997 to 2003.

Panagopoulos was president of Interferry, the worldwide association of ferry ship operators. During his tenure as president, Interferry, was recognized with advisor status to the International Maritime Organization.
