= Zierbena =

Coordinates: 43°21′N 3°5′W

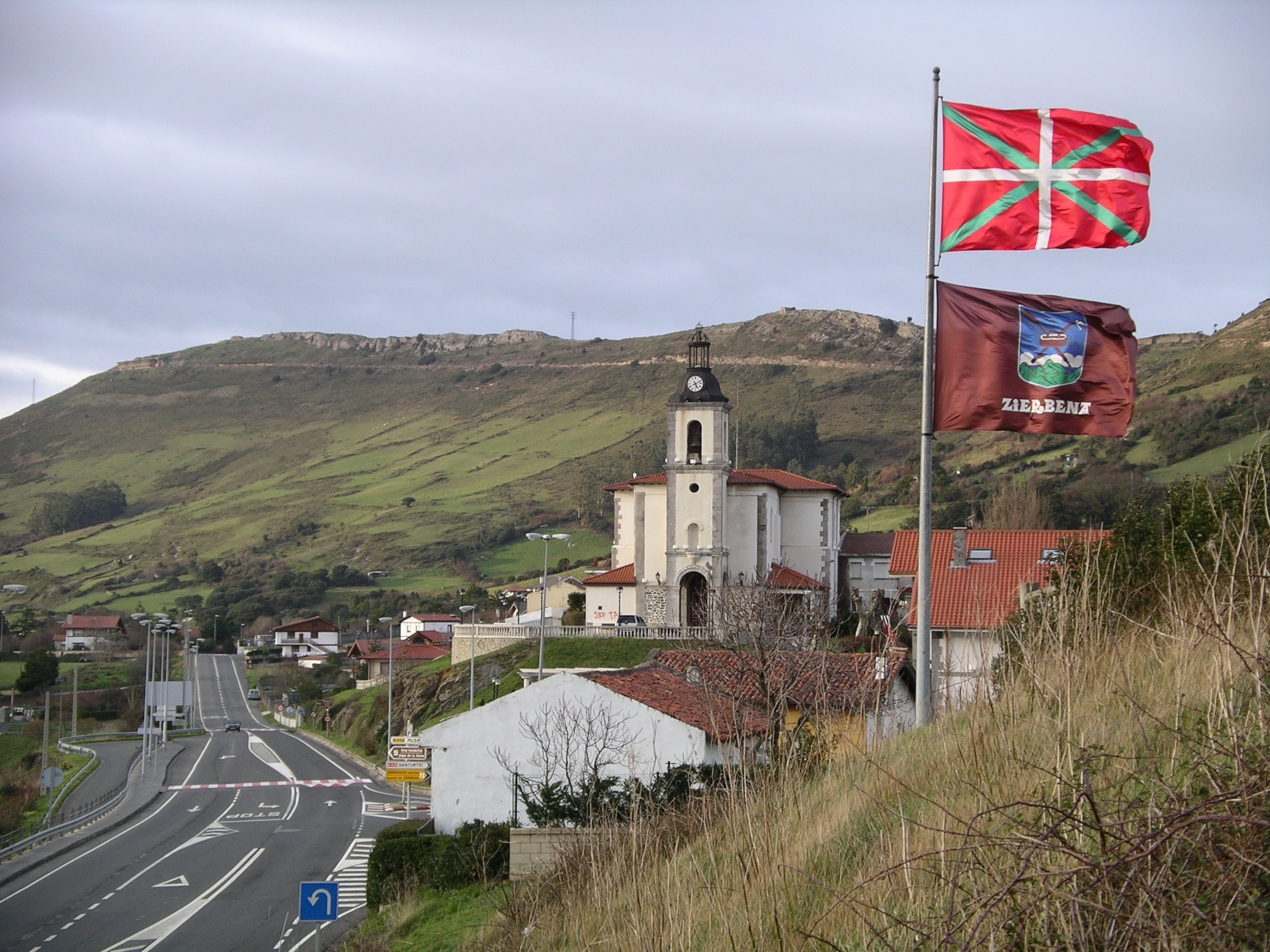

- Flag Coat of arms

- Location in Spain.
- Country: Spain
- Autonomous community: Biscay

Area
  - Total: 9.15 km^{2} (3.53 sq mi)
- Elevation: 84 m (276 ft)

Population (2025-01-01)
  - Total: 1,512
  - Density: 165/km^{2} (428/sq mi)
- Time zone: UTC+1 (CET)
  - Summer (DST): UTC+2 (CEST)
- Website: www.zierbena.net

Zierbena is a town and municipality located in the province of Biscay in the autonomous community of Basque Country, northern Spain.

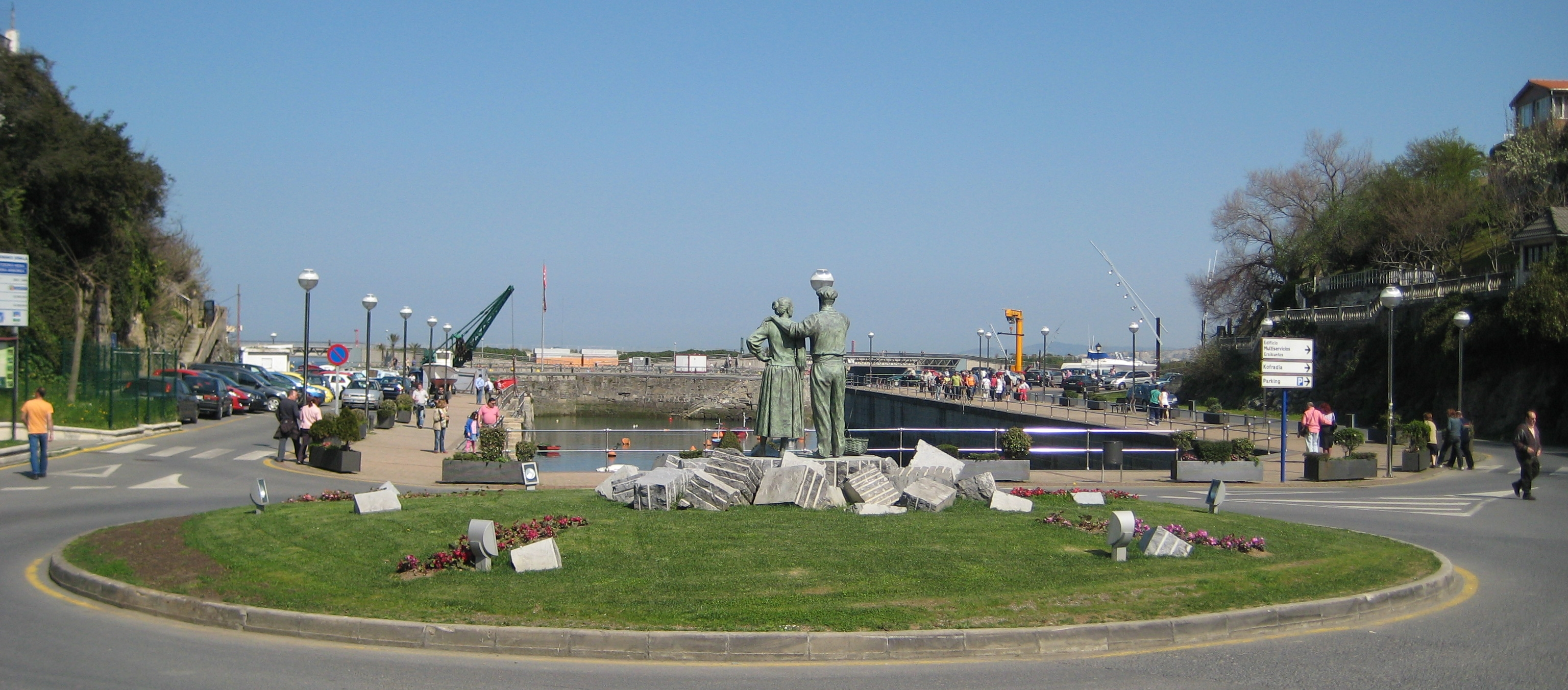
Zierbena

== Ferry port ==
Destination	Goes via	Average crossing duration	Name of ferry	Operator (ferry company)
Portsmouth/Portsmouth International Port		23 hours (all outbound and one inbound)	MV Cap Finistère	Brittany Ferries
Portsmouth/Portsmouth International Port	Into Zierbena on Tuesday - via Roscoff on Monday (departs Portsmouth on Sunday)	33 hours (no outbound but one inbound)	MV Cap Finistère	Brittany Ferries

The ferry port in Zierbena (which is known to some as Bilbao Ferry Port) has two departures and arrivals per week of the MV Cap Finistère (for Brittany Ferries) to and from Portsmouth (Portsmouth International Port).
