= GNV =

GNV may refer to:

- Gainesville Regional Airport (IATA airport code: GNV; ICAO airport code: KGNV), in Florida, USA
- Grand Airways (IATA airline code: QD; ICAO airline code: GNV; callsign: GRAND VEGAS), a defunct U.S. airline; see List of defunct airlines of the United States (D–I)
- Genivar (stock ticker GNV), a Canadian engineering consulting company
- Grandi Navi Veloci, an Italian shipping company
- GNU's Not VMS, an operating system, a reimplementation of OpenVMS
- 1599 Geneva Bible (GNV)
