= Superfast Ferries =

Greek shipping line ferry company

Superfast Ferries S.A.
- Type: Wholly owned subsidiary
- Industry: Transport
- Headquarters: Athens, Greece
- Products: Passenger transportation, Freight transportation, Holidays, Business travel
- Parent: Attica Holdings
- Website: www.superfast.com

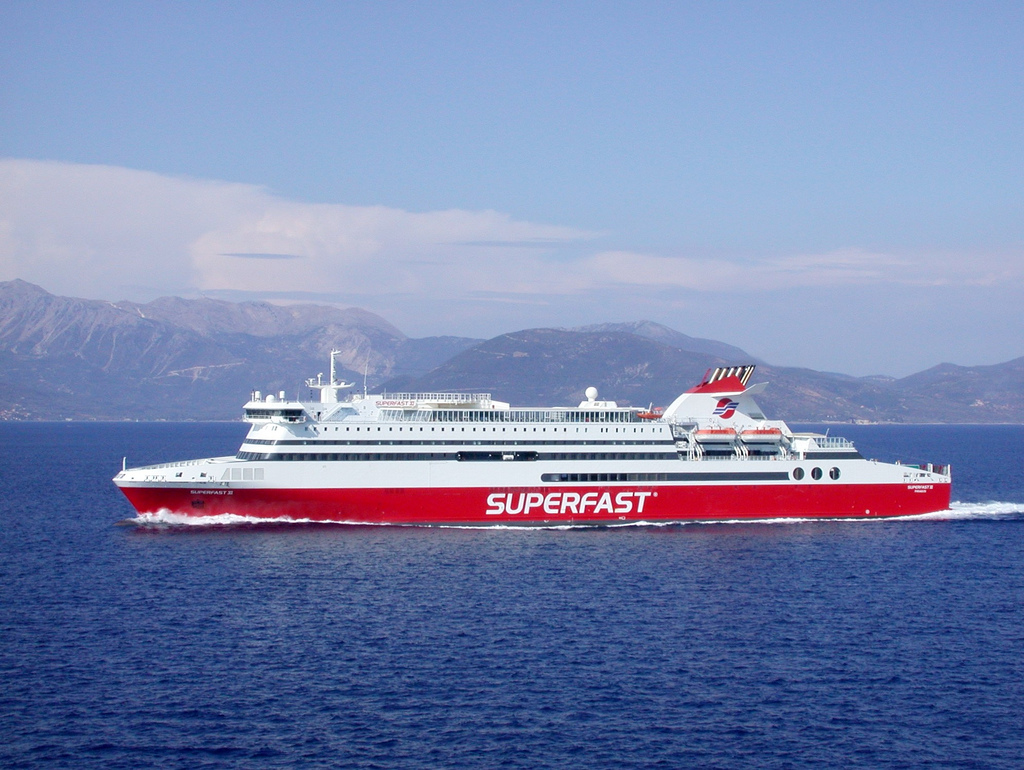
MS Superfast XI bound to Ancona passing Kefalonia island.

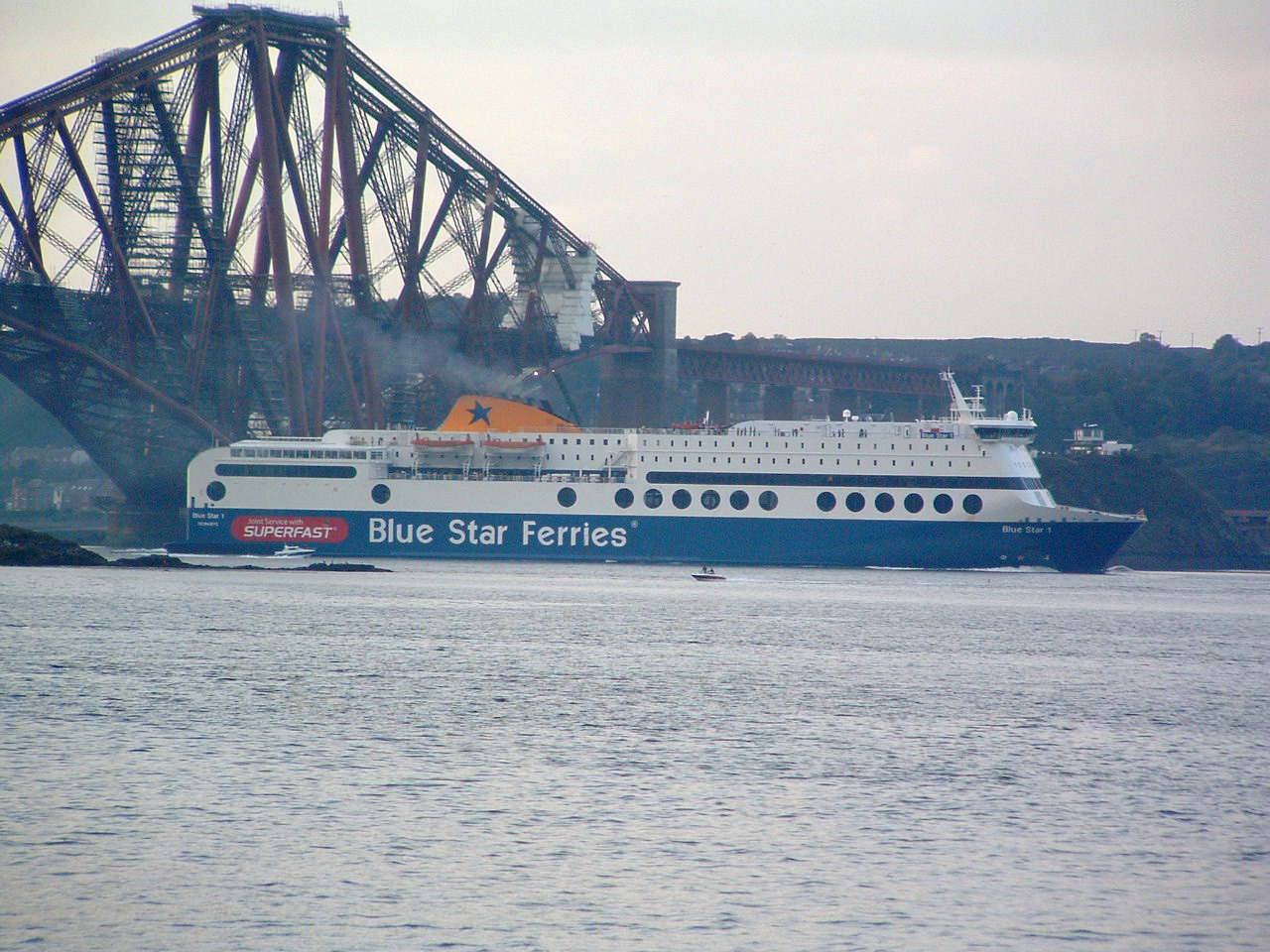
MS Blue Star 1 of the joint Superfast Ferries/Blue Star Ferries service from Rosyth to Zeebrugge in the Firth of Forth.

Superfast Ferries is a Greece-based ferry company founded in 1993 by Pericles Panagopulos and Alexander Panagopulos. Superfast Ferries is a member of Attica Group and operates 5 car-passenger ferries, offering daily connections between Ancona and Bari in Italy, and Patras and Igoumenitsa in Greece. Together with Blue Star Ferries, ANEK Lines and Hellenic Seaways, it is a subsidiary company of Attica Group, which is listed on the Athens Stock Exchange.

== Routes ==
In the past, Superfast Ferries has operated lines in several parts of Europe, in the Adriatic Sea, Aegean Sea, North Sea, and the Baltic Sea. Currently, they are mainly active in the Adriatic Sea, operating between Greece and Italy. Their routes are between the Italian ports of Ancona and Bari and the Greek ports of Igoumenitsa and Patras, as well as between Bari and Corfu.

Superfast operated the Rosyth – Zeebrugge ferry service between 2002 and 2008. On 29 May 2008, it was announced that Superfast Ferries would withdraw across the North Sea. The service was subsequently withdrawn on 13 September 2008. The North Sea service was mainland Scotland's only year-round, direct, scheduled ferry service to and from Continental Europe. The vessel used was Blue Star 1, which replaced the larger Superfast X on the route. Blue Star 1 has been reallocated to Attica's Mediterranean services. Norfolkline restarted the route in May 2009.

Superfast also operated between Piraeus and Heraklion until 2013. On 8 March 2013 it was announced that Superfast VI has been sold to Genting Group and Superfast XII, which was operating that route, was transferred to its position in Adriatic Sea.

Superfast had proposed and was the favourite to run a new ferry service between Great Yarmouth, United Kingdom and IJmuiden, Netherlands in 2004 at the new Great Yarmouth Outer Harbour development after a bidding process held in 2002. Superfast never went ahead with the route.

== Vessel allocations ==
In late 2005, Superfast ferries removed one of the two ships operating the link between Zeebrugge and Rosyth, thus turning the daily link from Belgium to Scotland into one operated only every other day. Superfast IX joined the two ship operation between Hanko and Rostock to serve the growing demand in the Finland – Germany service.

In addition, Superfast introduced a new "roll-on/roll-off" (RO/RO) service between Uusikaupunki and Rostock in January 2005. Attica has since moved one of the RO/RO ships, RORO MARIN, to their Adriatic Sea routes.

In April 2006, Superfast and Attica once more took the market by surprise by agreeing to sell the Superfast VII, Superfast VIII, and Superfast IX ice-class ferries to Estonian operator Tallink for €310 million.

In August 2006, Attica entered into an agreement to sell to Veolia Transport its ice-class vessel Superfast X trading between Scotland and Belgium for €112 million. The delivery of Superfast X took place in January 2007.

In September 2007, Pericles Panagopulos, the former key shareholder of Attica and then Chairman, sold his family's participation for €5.50 per share to Marfin Investment Group. The move was seen as a "family transition" decision and was interpreted to be an exit for the then 72-year-old investor. Alexander Panagopulos, CEO of Attica, resigned prior to this sale and founded his shipping company by the name Arista Shipping S.A.

== ANEK–Superfast ==
On 8 June 2011, Superfast Ferries and ANEK Lines created a joint venture in the name of ANEK–Superfast to operate Piraeus – Heraklion and Patras – Igoumenitsa – Ancona routes using two passenger RO/RO vessels in the former route (the ANEK-owned "Olympic Champion" and the Superfast-owned "Superfast XII") and three in the latter route (the ANEK-owned "Hellenic Spirit" and the Superfast-owned "Superfast VI" and "Superfast XI").

== Controversy ==
On January 18, 2023, Lighthouse Reports, in collaboration with SRF, ARD, Al Jazeera, Il Domani and Solomon published a report claiming illegal pushbacks of asylum seekers from Italy to Greece using Superfast ferries. If those asylum seekers arrived to the ports of Venice, Ancona, Bari, and Brindisi, they were denied the opportunity to seek asylum and were pushed back using the Superfast ships. Immigrants were put into shower rooms and metal boxes with caged roofs, sometimes being handcuffed to metal shelves.

== Fleet ==
=== Current fleet ===
Ship	Flag	Built	Entered Service	Gross tonnage	Length	Width	Passengers	Vehicles	Knots	Photos
Superfast XI	(Greece)	2002	2002	30.902 GT	199,9 m	25 m	1.821	653	29	
Superfast I	(Greece)	2008	2008	25.757 GT	199,1 m	26,6 m	928	783	24,2	
Superfast II	(Greece)	2009	2009	25.518 GT	199,1 m	26,6 m	928	783	24,2	
Ariadne	(Greece)	1996	2023	30.882 GT	195,6 m	27 m	2.045	640	24	
Superfast III	(Greece)	2000	2024	32.694 GT	204 m	25,8 m	1.833	670	30	
Superfast IV	(Greece)	2001	2025	32.694 GT	204 m	25,8 m	1.850	670	30	
Superfast V	(Cyprus)	2021	2026	32.581 GT	203,3 m	25 m	970	240	24	

=== Future fleet ===
Ship	Flag	Built	To Enter Service	Gross tonnage	Length	Width	Passengers	Vehicles	Knots	Notes	Photos
Superfast VI	(Cyprus)	2027	June 2027	47.062 GT	239,7 m	27,8 m	1.500	600	24	On charter from Stena Line	
Superfast VII	(Cyprus)	2027	October 2027	47.062 GT	239,7 m	27,8 m	1.500	600	24	On charter from Stena Line	

=== Past fleet ===
Ship	Years in service	Gross tonnage	Current status
Superfast I	1995–2004	23,663 GT	Since 2008 MS Skania for Unity Line
Superfast II	1995–2003	23,663 GT	Since 2006 Mega Express Four for Corsica Ferries
Superfast III	1998–2002	29,067 GT	Since 2002 Spirit of Tasmania II for Spirit of Tasmania
Superfast IV	1998–2002	29,067 GT	Since 2002 Spirit of Tasmania I for Spirit of Tasmania
Superfast V	2001–2010	32,728 GT	Since 2022 GNV Spirit for Grandi Navi Veloci
Superfast VI	2001–2013	32,728 GT	Since 2021 MS Europa Palace for Grimaldi Group
Superfast VII	2001–2006	30,285 GT	Since 2011 MS Stena Superfast VII for Stena Line
Superfast VIII	2001–2006	30,285 GT	Since 2011 MS Stena Superfast VIII for Stena Line
Superfast IX	2002–2006	30,285 GT	Since 2026 St Patrick for Hibernia Line
Superfast X	2002–2007	29,800 GT	Since 2026 on charter as Île Rouge from Stena RoRo to Marine Atlantic
Superfast XII	2002–2018	30,902 GT	Since 2018 MS Cruise Ausonia for Grimaldi Group
Asterion II	2022–2024	31,804 GT	Since 2024 operates for ANEK Lines
AF Claudia	2024–2025	24,418 GT	Since 2025 it operates again for Adria Ferries
Akka	2025–2026	36,468 GT	Since 2026 it operates for Hibernia Line
Lefka Ori	2024–2026	27,320 GT	Since 2026 Daleela Express to Arab Bridge Maritime

== Routes ==
- Greece - Italy:
  - Superfast I & Superfast II: Patras-(Sami)-Igoumenitsa-Bari
  - Superfast III, Superfast IV & Superfast XI: Patras-Igoumenitsa-(Corfu)-Ancona
  - Superfast V: Patras-Igoumenitsa-Venice
  - Ariadne: Piraeus–Chios–Mytilene
