= Mega Express Four =

Fast roll-on/roll-off ferry

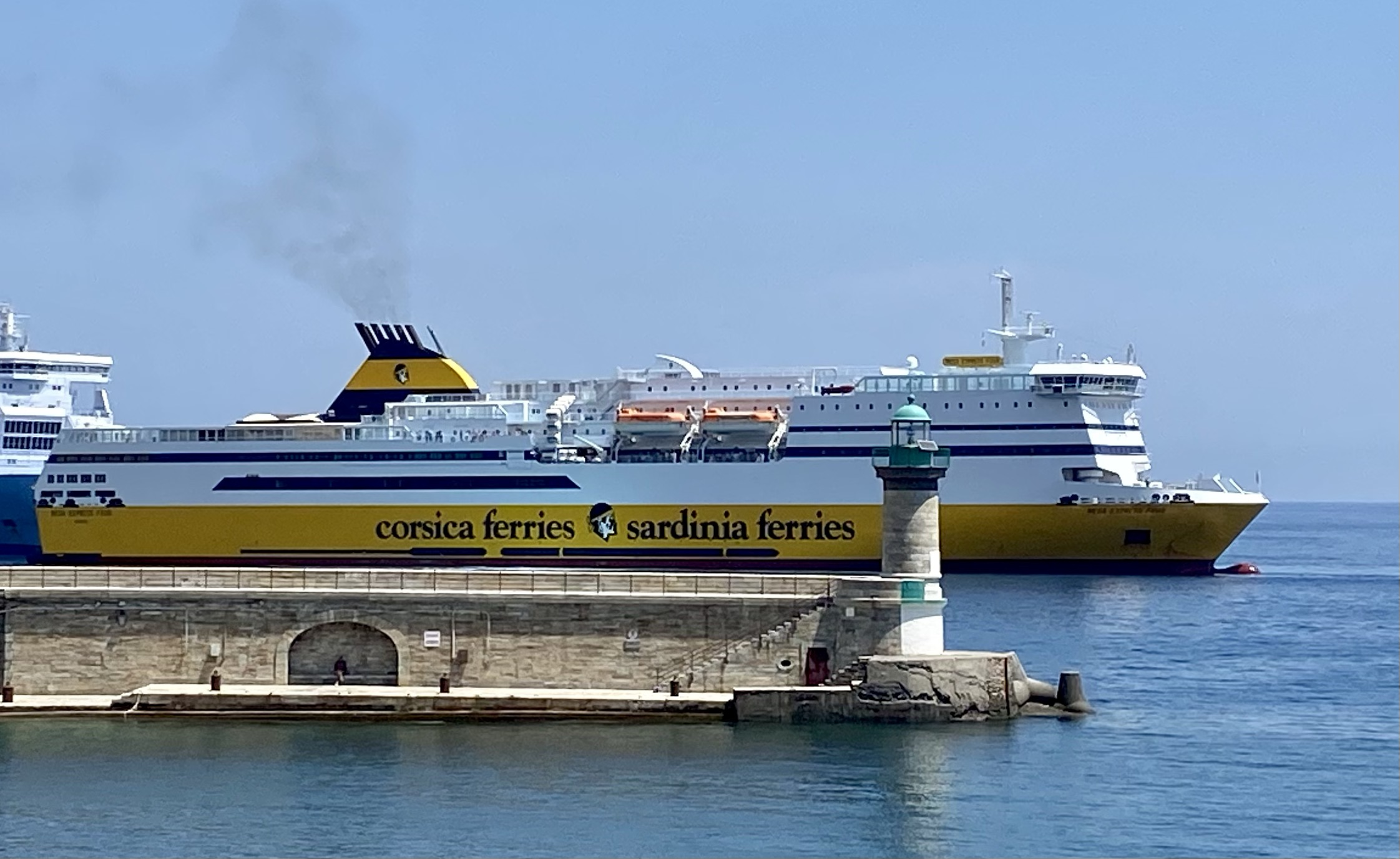
- Mega Express Four in Bastia

History
- Name: 1995–2003: Superfast II; 2003–2006: Spirit of Tasmania III; 2006 onwards: Mega Express Four
- Owner: 1995–2003: Superfast Ferries; 2003–2006: Spirit of Tasmania; 2006 onwards: Corsica Ferries
- Operator: 1995–2003: Superfast Ferries; 2003–2006: TT-Line; 2021-2021: Irish Ferries; 2006 onwards: Corsica Ferries
- Port of registry: 1995–2003: Patras, Greece; 2003–2006: Devonport, Australia; 2006 onwards: Genoa, Italy
- Builder: Schichau Seebeckwerft, Bremerhaven, Germany
- Yard number: 1088
- Launched: 14 January 1995
- Christened: 25 March 1995
- Acquired: 31 May 1995
- Identification: IMO number: 9086590; Call sign: ICAI; MMSI number: 247178700
- Status: In service

General characteristics (as Superfast II)
- Class & type: Superfast I class fast roll-on/roll-off ferry
- Tonnage: 23,663 GT; 5,717 DWT
- Length: 173.50 m (569 ft 3 in)
- Beam: 24.00 m (79 ft)
- Draught: 6.41 m (21 ft 0 in)
- Installed power: 4 × Wärtsilä-Sulzer 12ZAV40S diesels; 34550 kW
- Speed: 27.9 knots (51.7 km/h; 32.1 mph) maximum speed
- Capacity: 1400 passengers; 686 berths; 830 cars; 1850 lanemeters

General characteristics (as Mega Express Four)
- Tonnage: 24,186 GT; 4,855 DWT
- Speed: 26 kn (48.15 km/h) service speed
- Capacity: 1965 passengers; 909 berths; 550 cars; 1400 lanemeters

Mega Express Four is a fast roll-on/roll-off ferry owned by Corsica Ferries - Sardinia Ferries and operated on its routes from Italy and France to Corsica and Sardinia. She was built in 1995 by Schichau Seebeckwerft in Bremerhaven, Germany for Superfast Ferries as Superfast II. Between 2003 and 2006 she sailed for Spirit of Tasmania as Spirit of Tasmania III.

== Concept and construction ==
Superfast II was the second ship built for Superfast Ferries for its Adriatic Sea services from Patras to Ancona. Its construction was identical to that of MS Superfast I.

== Service history ==
=== 1995–2003: Superfast II ===
Superfast II entered service on 11 June 1995 on Superfast Ferries' Patras to Ancona route. In April 1998, following the delivery of the new MS Superfast IV, Superfast II was transferred to the Patras—Igoumenitsa—Bari route. From October 1999 until January 2000 she returned to the Patras—Ancona route as a replacement for MS Superfast III that was undergoing repairs after an onboard fire. In July 2003 Superfast II was sold to Spirit of Tasmania, with a delivery date set in September of the same year. TT-Line had already purchased Superfast III and Superfast IV the previous year, renaming them Spirit of Tasmania II and Spirit of Tasmania I, respectively.

=== 2003–2006: Spirit of Tasmania III ===
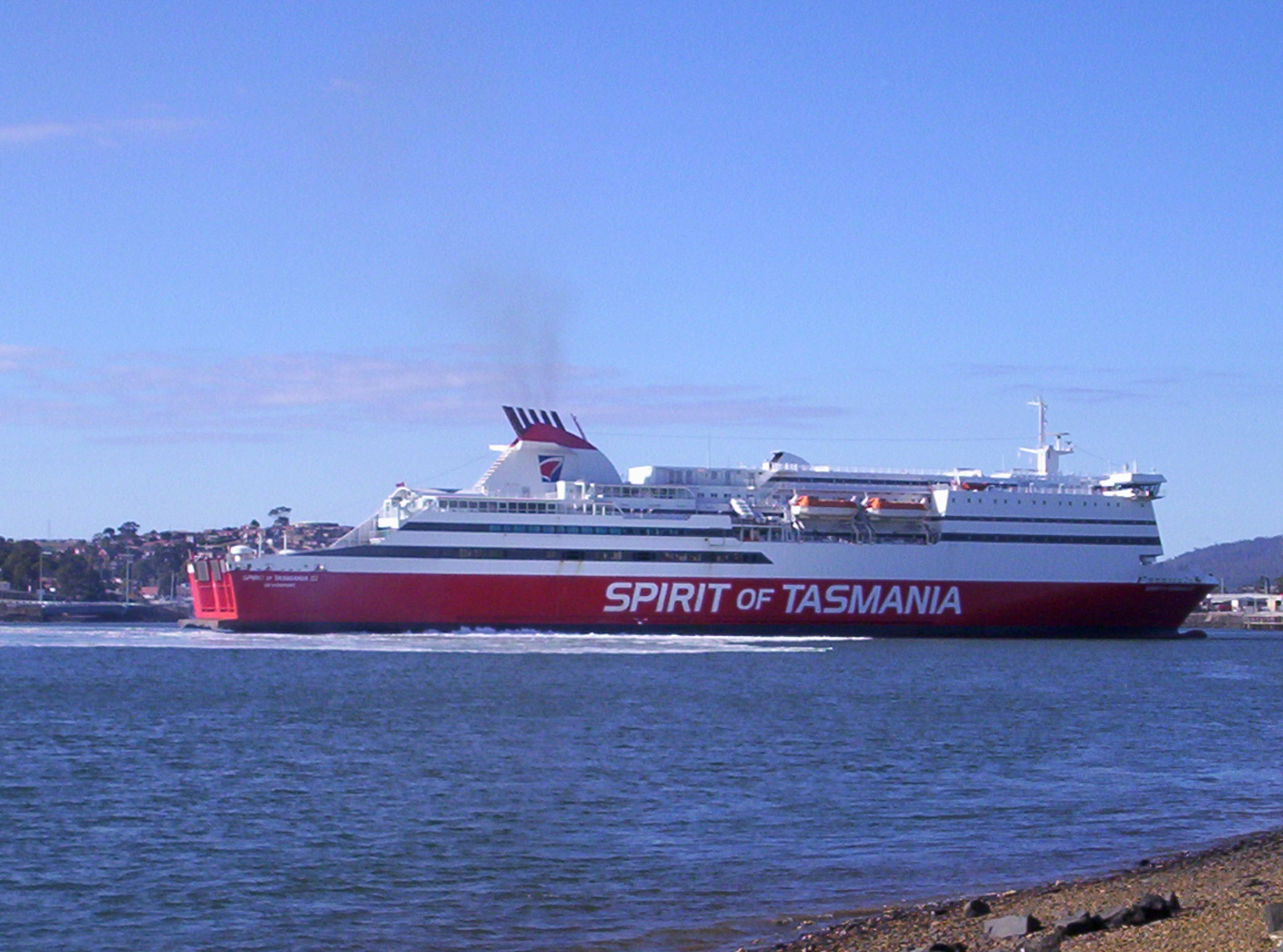
Spirit of Tasmania III on Mersey River, Devonport

TT-Line took over the ship on 30 September 2003 and renamed her Spirit of Tasmania III. It subsequently sailed to Hobart, Tasmania, where it was refitted for its new service. On 15 January 2004, the ferry entered service on Spirit of Tasmania's new Sydney to Devonport route. Passenger demand for the new service proved smaller than had been expected, and the low passenger numbers combined with rising fuel costs led to the Government of Tasmania's decision to terminate the service in August 2006. As a result, Spirit of Tasmania III was put up for sale.

On 17 July 2006 Spirit of Tasmania III was sold to Mediterranean operator Corsica Sardinia Ferries for €65 million (A$111 million). The ship left on her final voyage for TT-Line on 27 August 2006.

=== 2006 onwards: Mega Express Four ===
Corsica Sardinia Ferries took over Spirit of Tasmania III on 5 September 2006 and renamed it Mega Express Four. The ferry entered service for its new owners in November of the same year. Between January and April 2007, it was rebuilt at the Megatechnica shipyard in Perama, Greece with an expanded aft superstructure. She returned to service on 4 May 2007.

From February to 3 April 2021, she was chartered to Irish Ferries for general relief during its ferries annual overhauls, mostly covering the Dublin to Holyhead route.
