= Superfast I =

Greek ferry launched in 2008

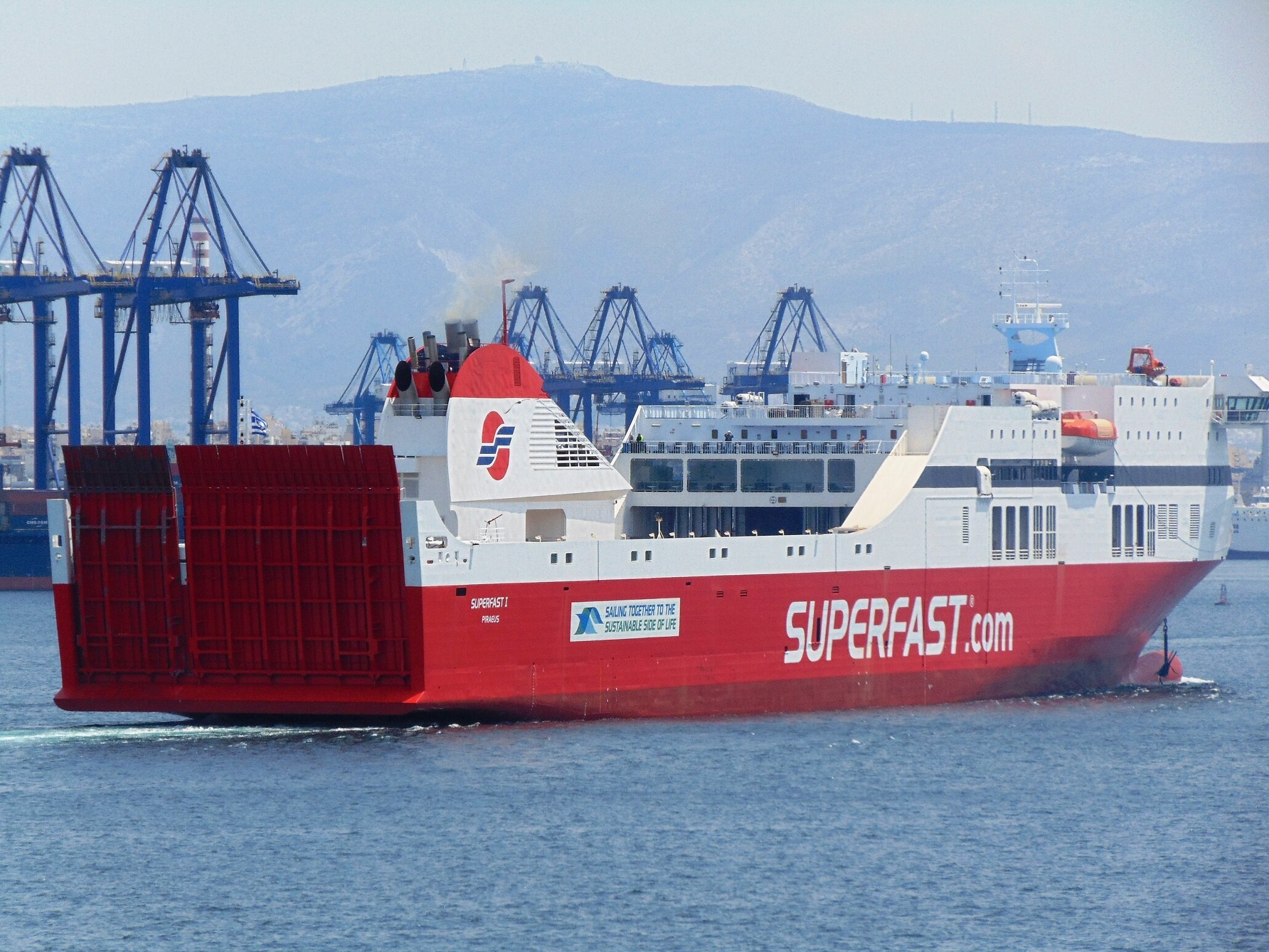
- Superfast I departing from Perama.

History

Greece
- Name: Superfast I (2008–present)
- Owner: Attica Group (2008–present)
- Operator: Superfast Ferries (2008–present)
- Port of registry: Piraeus, Greece
- Builder: Nuovi Cantieri Apuania, Marina di Carrara, Italy
- Yard number: 1241
- Launched: 2008
- Completed: October 2008
- Identification: IMO number: 9350719; MMSI: 240815000; Call sign: SVAK2
- Status: In service

General characteristics
- Type: Ro-Pax cruiseferry
- Tonnage: 25,757 GT
- Length: 199.14 m (653 ft 4 in)
- Beam: 26.60 m (87 ft 3 in)
- Draft: 6.40 m (21 ft 0 in)
- Installed power: 24,000 kW (32,000 hp) (Total)
- Propulsion: 2 × Wärtsilä 12V46 diesel engines
- Speed: 25 knots (46 km/h; 29 mph) (max)
- Capacity: 938 passengers; 783 cars (2,505 lane meters)

Superfast I is an Italian-built cruise ferry completed in 2008. Purchased by Attica Group during construction and modified for expanded passenger capacity, the vessel has spent her entire career serving the Patras–Igoumenitsa–Bari line.

== Service ==
The ferry, ordered with the name Forza by Grimaldi Lines at Nuovi Cantieri Apuania in Marina di Carrara, was purchased on 5 June 2008 by Superfast Ferries, for which it was launched on 12 June with the name Superfast I. On 3 September 2008, it was then transferred to the San Giorgio del Porto shipyards at Genoa, where it was completed. On 6 October, at the end of the work, the ferry was delivered to Superfast Ferries and four days later it arrived at Patras, where it started service on 13 October on the connections between Patras, Igoumenitsa and Bari. It still operates on this route in tandem with its sister ship, Superfast II.

== Accidents and incidents ==
On 14 September 2012, during its docking maneuvers at the port of Patras, Superfast I struck the stern of the moored ferry Kriti II with its bow, causing minor damage to both vessels. The collision occurred amidst challenging weather conditions, with southeasterly winds blowing at 6 to 7 Beaufort. There were 210 passengers on board Superfast I at the time, and no injuries were reported. The Patras Port Authority temporarily banned both ships from sailing until full safety inspections could be completed.

== Sister ships ==
- Rizhao Orient
- Athena Seaways
- Tenacia
- Forza
- Superfast II
- Victoria Seaways
- Regina Seaways
