= MS Skania =

High-speed cruise ferry

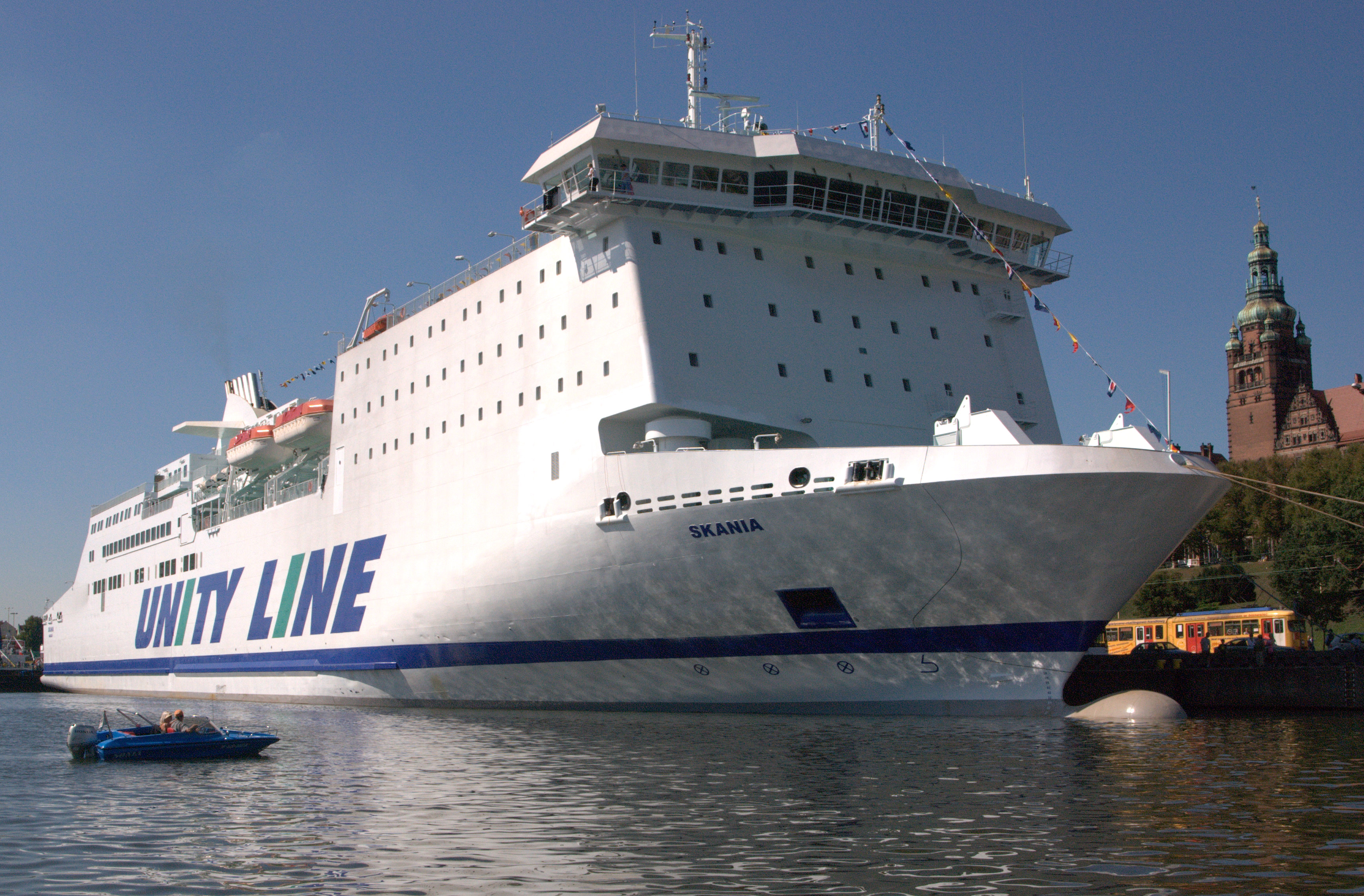
- Skania

History
- Name: 1995–2004: Superfast I; 2004–2008: Eurostar Roma; 2008 onwards: Skania
- Owner: 1995–2004: Superfast Ferries; 2003–2008: Atlantic Navigazion; 2008 onwards: Polish Steamship Co
- Operator: 1995–2004: Superfast Ferries; 2004–2008: Grimaldi lines; 2008-2026: Unity Line; 2026 onwards: POLSCA Baltic Ferries
- Port of registry: 1995–2004: Patras, Greece 2004–2008: Naples, Italy; 2008-2008: Nassau, Bahamas; 2008 onwards: Limassol, Cyprus
- Route: Gdańsk - Karlshamn
- Builder: Schichau Seebeckwerft, Bremerhaven, Germany
- Yard number: 1087
- Launched: 30 July 1995
- Christened: 25 March 1995
- Acquired: 6 April 1995
- In service: 15 April 1995
- Identification: IMO number: 9086588; Call sign: C6XF4; MMSI number: 311007200
- Status: In service

General characteristics (as built)
- Tonnage: 23,663 GT
- Length: 173.7 m
- Beam: 24 m
- Draught: 6.42 m
- Installed power: 4x Wartsila NSD 12 ZAV 40S
- Speed: 27 kn
- Capacity: 1397 passengers; 626 berths; 1800 lane meters

General characteristics (after 2008 rebuilt)
- Tonnage: 23,933 GT
- Capacity: 1397 pax; 600 berths; 2135 lm
- Notes: otherwise as built

Skania is a fast ropax ferry operated by POLSCA Baltic Ferries on their Gdańsk - Karlshamn route. She was built in 1995 by Schichau Seebeckwerft in Bremerhaven, Germany for Superfast Ferries as Superfast I. Between 2004 and 2008 she sailed for Grimaldi Lines as the Eurostar Roma.

== Concept and construction ==
The Superfast I was the first ship built for Attica Group's subsidiary Superfast Ferries for its Adriatic Sea services from Patras to Ancona. She is a sister ship of Superfast II.

== Service history ==
=== 1995–2004: Superfast I ===
The Superfast I entered service on 14 April 1995 on Superfast Ferries' Patras—Ancona route. In March 1998 after the arrival of the Superfast III and Superfast IV, Superfast I, along with her sister Superfast II were transferred to a new route Bari – Igoumenitsa – Patras. In January 2004 the Superfast I was sold to Grimaldi lines, with a delivery date in February of the same year.

=== 2004–2008: Eurostar Roma ===
Grimaldi Lines took over the ship on 30 September 2003 and renamed her Eurostar Roma. On 15 March 2004, after a small refit she began on the Civitavecchia – Barcelona route. In March 2008 she was sold to the Polish Steamship Co. with delivery set for May 2008. In April, after the delivery of the new Cruise Roma she was put on Civitavecchia/ Salerno-Palermo- Tunis route for a short time.

=== 2008 onwards: Skania ===
On 5 May 2008, she was handed over to her new owners, Polish Steamship Co (Unity Line) and renamed Skania. She then sailed to Gdańsk for a refit, in which her aft open deck was enclosed, amongst other upgrades for her new role. On 29 August she was Christened in Szczecin and had public open days for the flowing two days in the port. On 1 September 2008, she started on the over night Świnoujście–Ystad route. On 17 February 2009, the Skania was involved in a collision near Ystad. In 2026, following the takeover of Unity Line by POLSCA Baltic Ferries, the ship continued sailing the route with her new operator. By July she was transferred to the new Gdańsk - Karlshamn line.

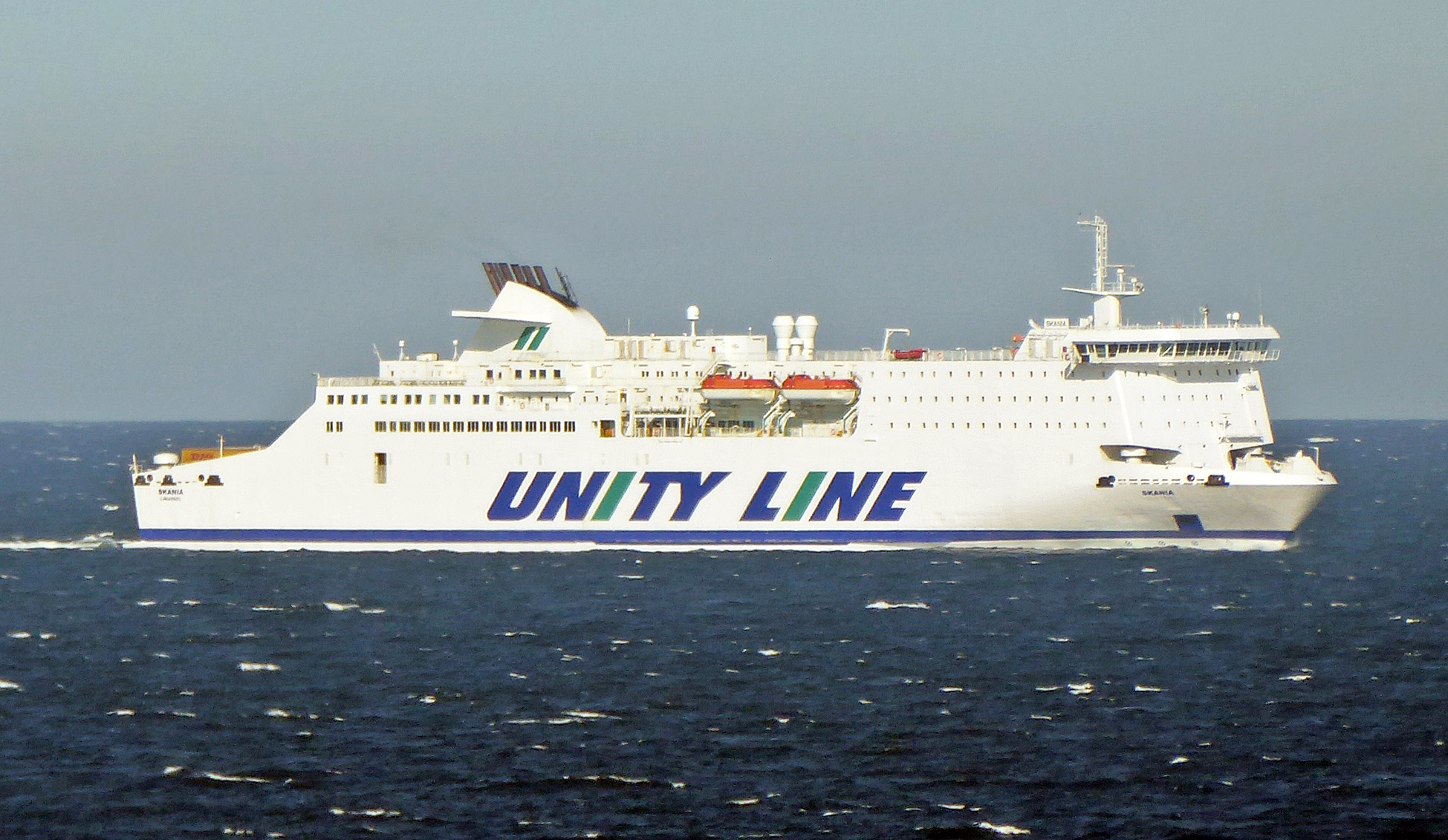
Skania on the Baltic Sea
