= Howaldtswerke-Deutsche Werft =

German shipbuilding company

Coordinates: 54°19′08″N 10°09′20″E

Howaldtswerke-Deutsche Werft GmbH
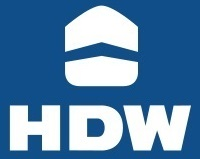
- Type: Subsidiary
- Industry: Shipbuilding
- Founded: 1838; 188 years ago
- Founder: August Howaldt and Johann Schweffel
- Headquarters: Kiel, Germany
- Number of employees: 2,400
- Parent: ThyssenKrupp Marine Systems

Howaldtswerke-Deutsche Werft GmbH (often abbreviated HDW) was a German shipbuilding company, headquartered in Kiel. It is now part of TKMS (ThyssenKrupp Marine Systems). The Howaldtswerke shipyard was founded in Kiel in 1838 and merged with Hamburg-based Deutsche Werft to form Howaldtswerke-Deutsche Werft (HDW) in 1968. The company's shipyard was formerly used by Friedrich Krupp Germaniawerft until the end of World War II.

== History ==
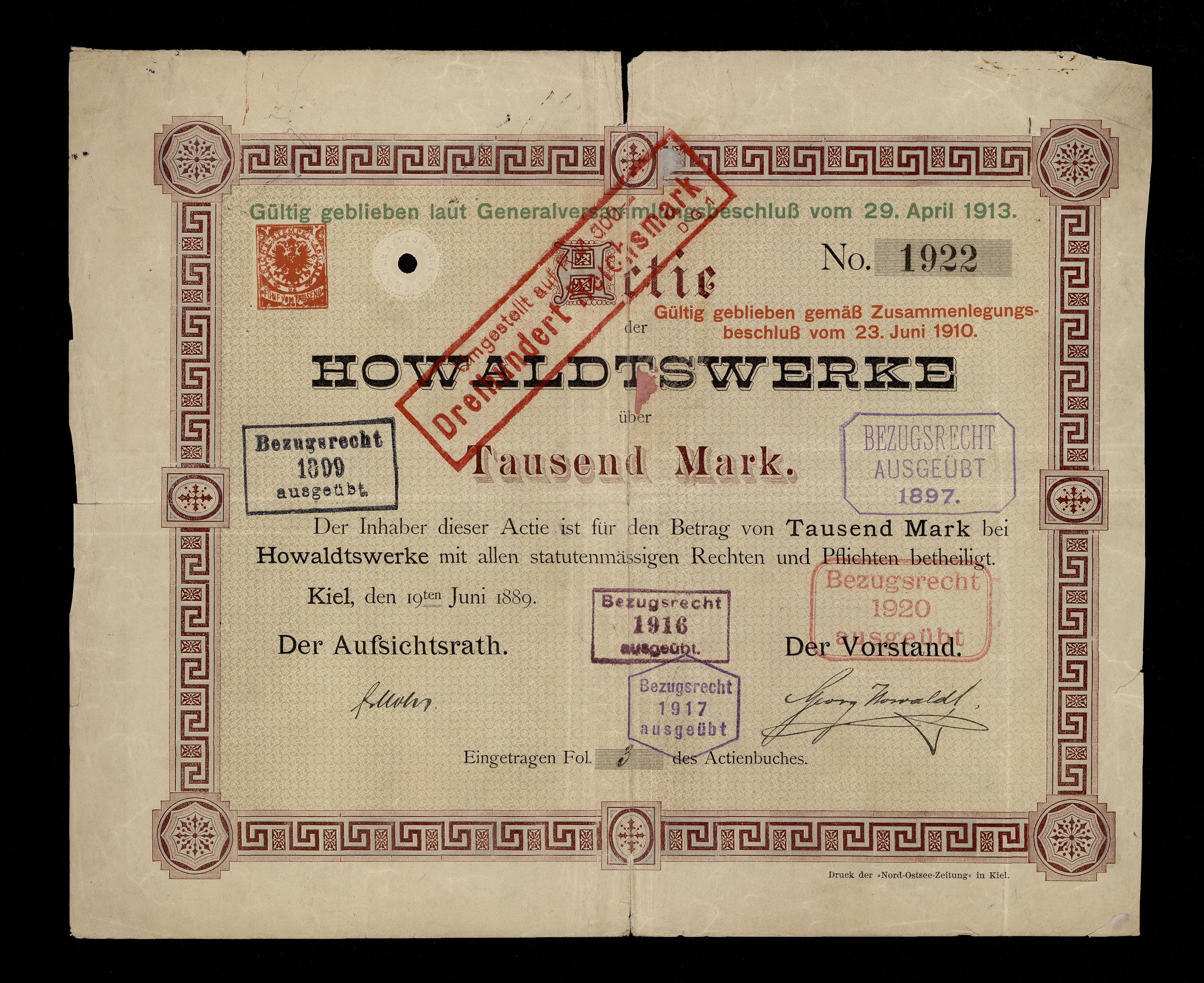
Share of the Howaldtswerke, issued 19 June 1889

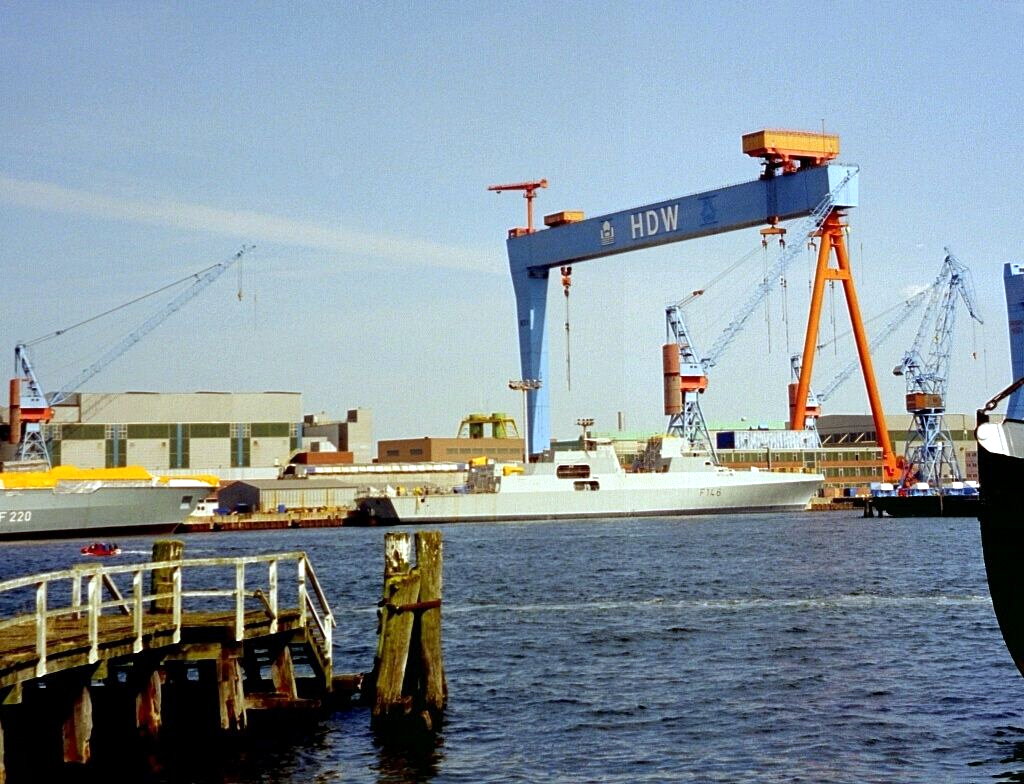
View of HDW-shipyard at Kiel, 2003

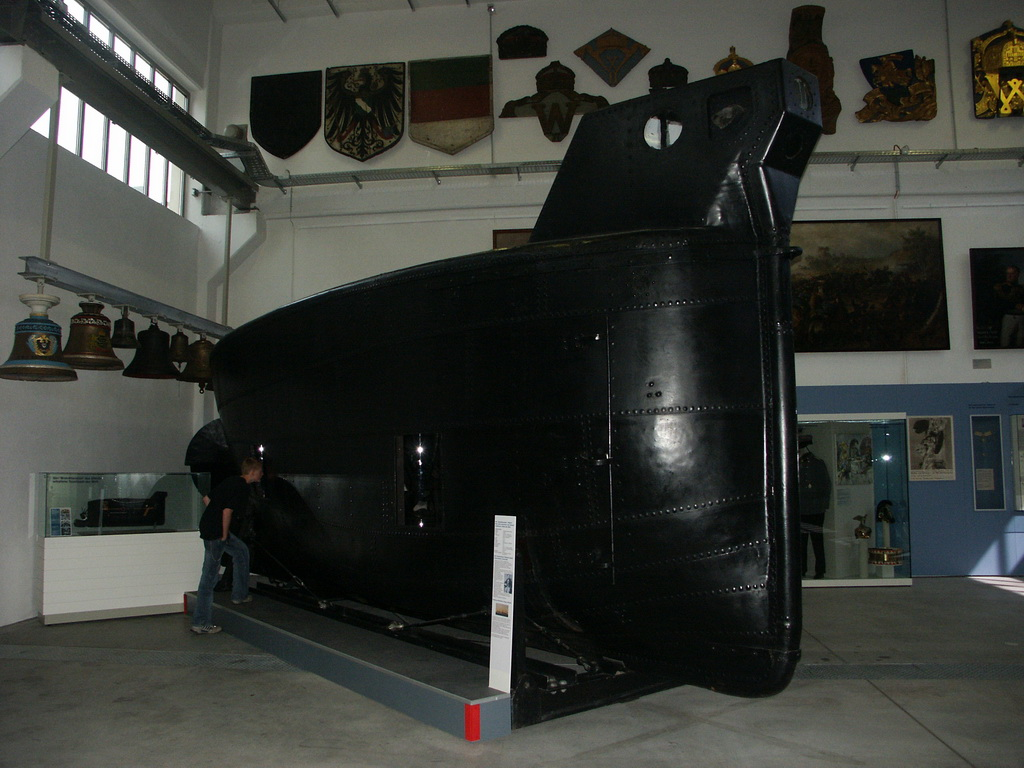
An early submarine, the Brandtaucher, in the museum in Dresden

HDW was founded 1 October 1838 in Kiel by engineer August Howaldt and entrepreneur Johann Schweffel under the name Maschinenbauanstalt und Eisengießerei Schweffel & Howaldt (Machine Factory and Iron Foundry Schweffel & Howaldt), initially building boilers.

The first steam engine for naval purposes was built in 1849 for Von der Tann, a gunboat for the small navy of Schleswig-Holstein. In 1850, the company built an early submarine, Brandtaucher, designed by Wilhelm Bauer. It had been intended to build the boat in Rendsburg but Danish forces advanced too close during the First Schleswig War, so construction was moved to Kiel.

The first ship built under the company's new name Howaldtswerke was a small steamer, named Vorwärts, built in 1865. Business expanded rapidly as Germany became a maritime power and, by the start of the 20th century, around 390 ships had been completed.

In 1892, the company started a subsidiary in Austro-Hungarian Fiume on the coast of the Adriatic Sea. The subsidiary closed ten years later, but the yard remains open under the name 3. Maj.

With Kiel being one of the two main bases of the Kaiserliche Marine, the shipyard also benefited much from navy maintenance, repair and construction contracts. During World War I the company also built a number of U-boats. By 1937, the company had yards in Kiel and in Hamburg, and was taken over by the Kriegsmarine. During World War II, Howaldtswerke built 33 VIIC U-boats in Hamburg and 31 in Kiel.

After the end of World War II, Howaldtswerke was the only major shipyard in Kiel that was not dismantled. The yard flourished during the "economic miracle" of the 1960s, with the construction of freighters and tankers, and again expanded by opening a shipyard in Hamburg. Howaldtswerke merged with Deutsche Werft in Hamburg in 1968, and the company took the new name Howaldtswerke-Deutsche Werft (HDW). In 1982, HDW took out ads in American newspapers offering to sell the U.S. Navy the rights to build a Type 2000 submarine in the U.S. using American labor and materials. Pressure from cheaper competitors in Japan and South Korea caused the closure of the Hamburg yard in 1985.

In March 2002, the American financial investor One Equity Partner (OEP) took over the majority of Babcock AG at HDW. Shortly after that, Babcock AG had to file for insolvency and called for a reserved transaction, but the OEP was able to avoid this.

In January 2005, HDW became a subsidiary of ThyssenKrupp Marine Systems (TKMS), which also part-owned Kockums of Malmö, Sweden and 24.9% of Hellenic Shipyards Co. of Skaramangas, Greece. The group employs around 6,600 workers. In 2009, HDW worked with Kockums and Northrop Grumman to offer a Visby-class corvette derivative in the American Focused Mission Vessel Study, a precursor to the Littoral combat ship program.

In July 2011, TKMS announced that it has confirmed an existing deal to sell the civilian shipbuilding assets of HDW Gaarden to Abu Dhabi MAR.

== Ships built by HDW (selection) ==
=== Civilian ===
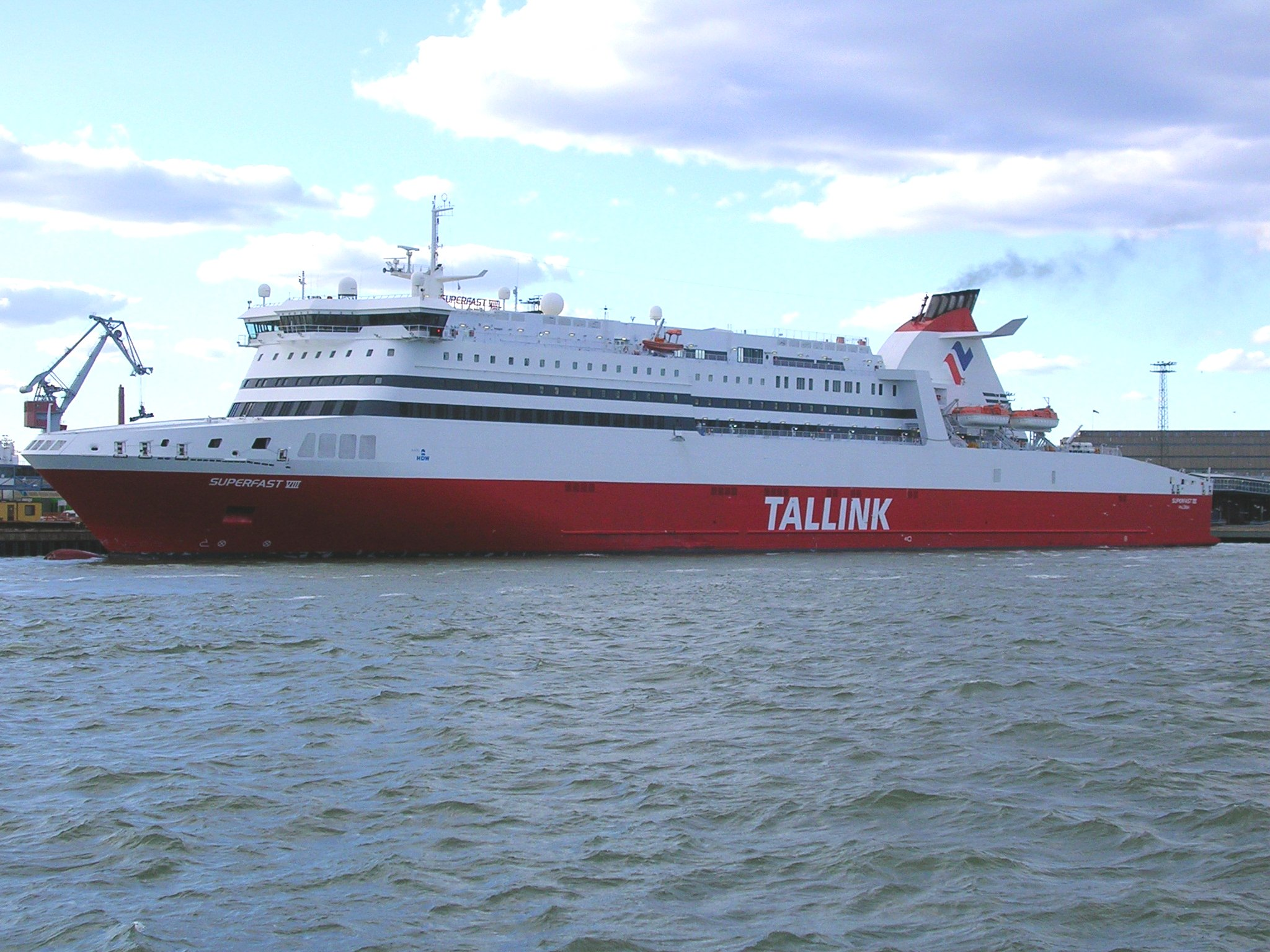
Superfast VIII at Helsinki

- Bungsberg (1924)
- Christina O (1954), luxury yacht conversion from naval vessel for Aristotle Onassis
- Otto Hahn (1968), nuclear powered freighter
- Tor Britannia (1975), cruiseferry
- Tor Scandinavia (1976), cruiseferry
- Bahamas Celebration (1981), cruiseferry
- Astor (1981), cruise ship
- Polarstern (1982), research icebreaker
- Astor (1987), cruise ship
- Superfast V (2001), fast ropax ferry
- Superfast VII (2001), fast ropax ferry
- Superfast VIII (2001), fast ropax ferry
- Superfast IX (2002), fast ropax ferry
- Superfast X (2002), fast ropax ferry

=== Naval ===
==== Battleships ====
- SMS Helgoland (1911)
- SMS Kaiserin (1913)
- SMS Bayern (1916)

==== Frigates ====
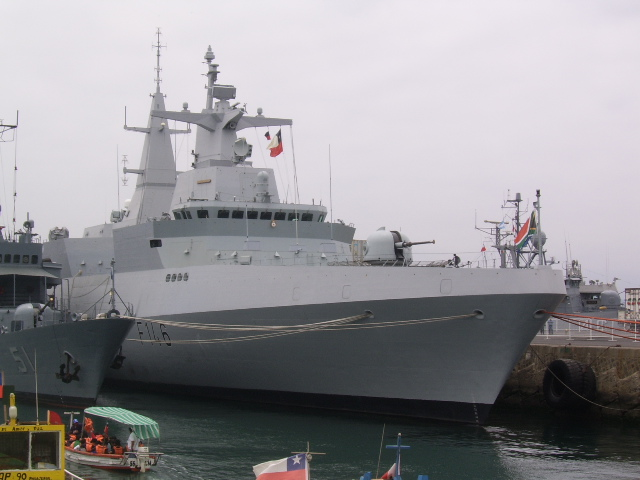
SAS Isandlwana

- Hamburg, a Sachsen-class frigate
- Kasturi-class frigate, two frigates built for the Royal Malaysian Navy
- Almirante Padilla-class frigate, frigates built for the Colombian Navy
- SAS Isandlwana
- SAS Mendi
- Schleswig-Holstein, a Brandenburg-class frigate

==== Corvettes ====
- Braunschweig-class corvettes

==== Submarines (U-boats) ====
- Type VIIC submarines (WWII)
- Type 201 submarines
- Type 205 submarines
- Type 206 submarines
- Type 209 submarines
- Type U 209PN submarines
- Type 212CD submarines
- Type 212 submarines
- Type 214 submarines
- Type 218 submarines
- Type 800 submarines
- Dolphin class
- Dakar class

==== Gunboats ====
- USS Topeka (PG-35) (built (only) by Howaldtswerke as Diogenes, a steamer (1881))See also
- ThyssenKrupp
