= Stena Superfast VII =

2000 ferry

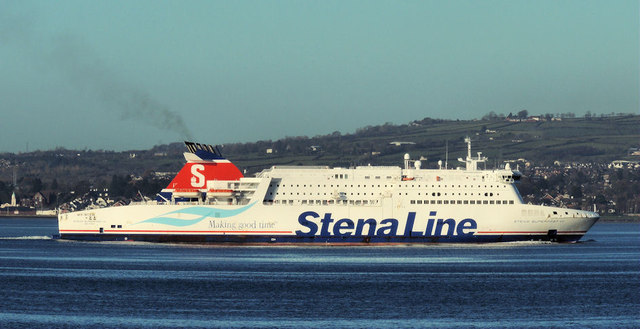
- Stena Superfast VII in Belfast

History
- Name: Stena Superfast VII
- Owner: 2002–06: Superfast Ferries; 2006–17: Baltic SF VII Ltd (Tallink); 2017 onwards: Stena Line
- Operator: 2002–06: Superfast Ferries; 2006–11: Tallink; 2011 onwards Stena Line
- Port of registry: 2002–06: Piraeus, Greece; 2006–11: Paldiski, Estonia; 2011 onwards: Belfast United Kingdom
- Route: Belfast–Cairnryan
- Builder: HDW, Kiel, Germany
- Yard number: 357
- Launched: 18 November 2000
- Acquired: 8 May 2001
- Maiden voyage: 17 May 2001
- In service: 17 May 2001
- Identification: IMO number: 9198941; Call sign: 2EZR3; MMSI number: 235089435
- Status: In service

General characteristics (as built)
- Class & type: Superfast VII class fast ropax ferry
- Tonnage: 30,285 GT; 5,915 t DWT
- Length: 203.90 m (669 ft)
- Beam: 25.00 m (82 ft)
- Height: 40.00 m (131 ft)
- Draught: 6.60 m (21 ft 8 in)
- Decks: 10
- Ice class: 1 A Super
- Installed power: 4 × Wärtsilä-Sulzer NSD ZA V40S diesels; combined 46,000 kW
- Propulsion: 2 propellers; 2 bow thrusters; 1 stern thruster
- Speed: 30.4 kn (56.30 km/h; 34.98 mph)
- Capacity: 626 passengers; 661 cars; 1,920 lane meters
- Crew: 63

General characteristics (in Stena Service)
- Class & type: Superfast VII class fast ropax ferry
- Tonnage: 10769 Net Tonnage; 30285 Gross Tonnage
- Displacement: 13315 tonnes (light)
- Length: 203.3 m (667 ft)
- Beam: 25 m (82 ft 0 in)
- Draught: 6.6 m (21 ft 8 in)
- Depth: 9.1 m (29 ft 10 in)
- Deck clearance: 4.7 m, 5.1 m on central 4 lanes of the upper vehicle deck
- Installed power: 4 × Wärtsilä-Sulzer NSD ZA V40S main engines producing 11,500 kW each(total 46,000 kW (62,000 shp)), coupled to 2 × 5.2 m KaMeWa propellers via 2 × Schelde dual input single output gearboxes; 3 × MAN B&W 8L28/32H, producing a total of 1,848 kW each @ 720 rpm
- Propulsion: 2 × 5.2 m KaMeWa propellers; 3 × 925 kW KaMeWa bow thrusters; 1 × 1,350 kW stern thruster
- Speed: 20 kn (37.0 km/h; 23.0 mph) - 22 kn (40.7 km/h; 25.3 mph) Consumption: 50 tonnes at slow speed (16 - 18 knots), 75 tonnes at eco speed (19 - 21 knots)
- Capacity: 1,200 passengers; 661 cars or 110 trailers (or a mix of both); 1924 lane metres; 5920 Deadweight
- Crew: 65 - 80 (dependent on service requirements); 18 (Minimum Safe Manning)
- Notes: Entered Stena service along with her sister Stena Superfast VIII on 21/11/2011.

Stena Superfast VII is a fast Ro-Pax ferry owned by Stena Line and operated on their service between Belfast and Cairnryan. Built in 2001 by Howaldtswerke-Deutsche Werft (HDW) in Kiel, Germany for Attica Group's subsidiary Superfast Ferries, The ship was sold to its current owners in 2017.

== Concept and construction ==
Stena Superfast VII was the first ship in a series of four ice-classified ropax ferries built by HDW in Kiel for Superfast Ferries' Baltic Sea services. The ship was ordered in 1998, alongside sister ship Superfast VIII, launched from dry dock on 8 November 2000 and was delivered to Superfast Ferries on 8 May 2001.

== Service history ==
=== 2001–06: Superfast Ferries ===
Following delivery the Superfast VII visited Rosyth, Scotland and Helsinki, Finland where it was displayed to the public. It inaugurated Superfast Ferries' Hanko (Finland) – Rostock (Germany) service on 17 May 2001. On 18 January 2002 a pregnant passenger went into labour on board while the Superfast VII was en route from Hanko to Rostock. Taking the ship to Karlshamn, Sweden, where the expecting mother could be taken to a hospital, was considered, but in the end the decision was made to bring a midwife on board by a pilot boat. The child had already been born by the time the midwife arrived on board, with the captain's wife assisting in childbirth.

On 12 November 2004 the Superfast VII was entering Hanko harbour in heavy wind with the help of two tugs when she was grounded near the Hanko breakwater at 19:24 Eastern European Time. The grounding resulted in no major damage and the ship was able to continue to the harbour soon afterwards. 140 passengers were on board at the time of the incident. Subsequent enquiries revealed the safety management system instructions provided for the crew by Superfast Ferries had not included instructions for port steering during a storm, which had led to an incorrect estimation of the wind effect and insufficient utilization of the ship's navigational equipment. Following the grounding the ship sailed to Turku Repair Yard in Naantali, Finland on 14 November 2004 and returned to service after repairs on 27 November 2004.

=== 2006–11: Tallink ===
On 21 March 2006 Superfast Ferries sold their Baltic Sea operations (Superfast VII, Superfast VIII and Superfast IX) to the Estonia-based Tallink, with the delivery date set for 10 April 2006. According to the agreement Tallink could continue utilising the Superfast brand until the end of 2007 at latest. Following delivery to the new owners the ship was moved from Finnish to Estonian registry, and the ship's route changed to Hanko–Paldiski–Rostock on 17 April 2006. The route change caused problems however as Estonia was not a member of the Schengen Treaty (unlike Finland and Germany), and passport control facilities had to be built in all ports. Already in June of the same year the route reverted to Hanko–Rostock. Around the same time the "Superfast" text on the ship's side was altered into "Superfast operated by Tallink".

The route of the Superfast VII was changed to Helsinki–Rostock on 1 January 2007 and Tallinn–Helsinki–Rostock on 14 January 2007. Coinciding with this all remaining Superfast logos on the ships were painted over with Tallink logos, but otherwise the original Superfast livery was maintained. Due to falling passenger numbers and rising fuel costs the route of Superfast VII and VIII reverted to Helsinki–Rostock in late 2008, while the Superfast IX began a charter to Marine Atlantic in October 2008. Reportedly Tallink are considering the closure of the entire Tallink Superfast -division. In January 2010, the Superfast VII and her sister were removed from service and laid up in Tallinn, but they resumed service on the Helsinki-Rostock route at the end of April 2010 and continuing during the summer and autumn season. On 29 and 30 December 2010, Superfast VII replaced Superstar on the route Tallinn-Helsinki due to scheduled docking.

=== 2011 onwards: Stena Line ===
In March 2011, Stena Line announced they will be chartering the Superfast VII and sister ship Superfast VIII. Superfast VII and Superfast VIII commenced operations on 21 November 2011 after major refit by MJM Marine in Remontowa Shipyard in Poland. The vessels now operate between Belfast and Stena Line's new terminal at Cairnryan. In February 2014, Stena renewed the charter of these ships until Autumn 2019. However, Stena decided to purchase both vessels outright for a combined price of €133.5M during 2017.

== Conversion to day ferries ==
Before the two ships entered service for Stena Line, an extensive refurbishment and conversion was undertaken, overseen by Stena Ro-Ro and Knud E Hansen, at the Remontowa Shipyard in Gdańsk, Poland. This was rumoured at the time to have cost a total of €14M.

As part of this conversion, the free height of the upper vehicle deck (deck 5) was raised to 5.05 m allowing Stena to carry full height freight. This included removing the passenger areas on deck 6, where there were areas such as a bar and a conference room. There still is a blue lift exit on deck 6, which only leads to the stairway.

Both ships also received an additional bow thruster to improve manoeuvrability. This took their complement to three bow thrusters and one stern thruster.

As the new port in Scotland had a TTS automated mooring system installed, the ships were also adapted to work with this by adding three steel bollards on the starboard side bow. The conversion of the vessels and construction of the new port in Scotland were part of a £200m rolling investment in the route between Scotland and Northern Ireland. There were also 2 remote controlled arms installed at Belfast Victoria Terminal 4, which attach to the stern of each vessel.

== Incidents ==
On 6 November 2018, Stena Superfast VII had a near-miss with a Royal Navy nuclear submarine submerged at periscope depth. The periscope passed about 50 - 100m off the ships starboard side.

On 19 July 2023, a small fire broke out in an emergency generator room onboard the Stena Superfast VII while docked in Belfast, as it prepared to sail for the 11.30 crossing from Belfast Harbour to Cairnryan. The sailing and all subsequent sailings were cancelled as a result.

== Other information ==
Stena Superfast VII and Stena Superfast VIII are managed by Northern Marine Management, a Stena owned company.
