= Stena Superfast VIII =

2000 ferry

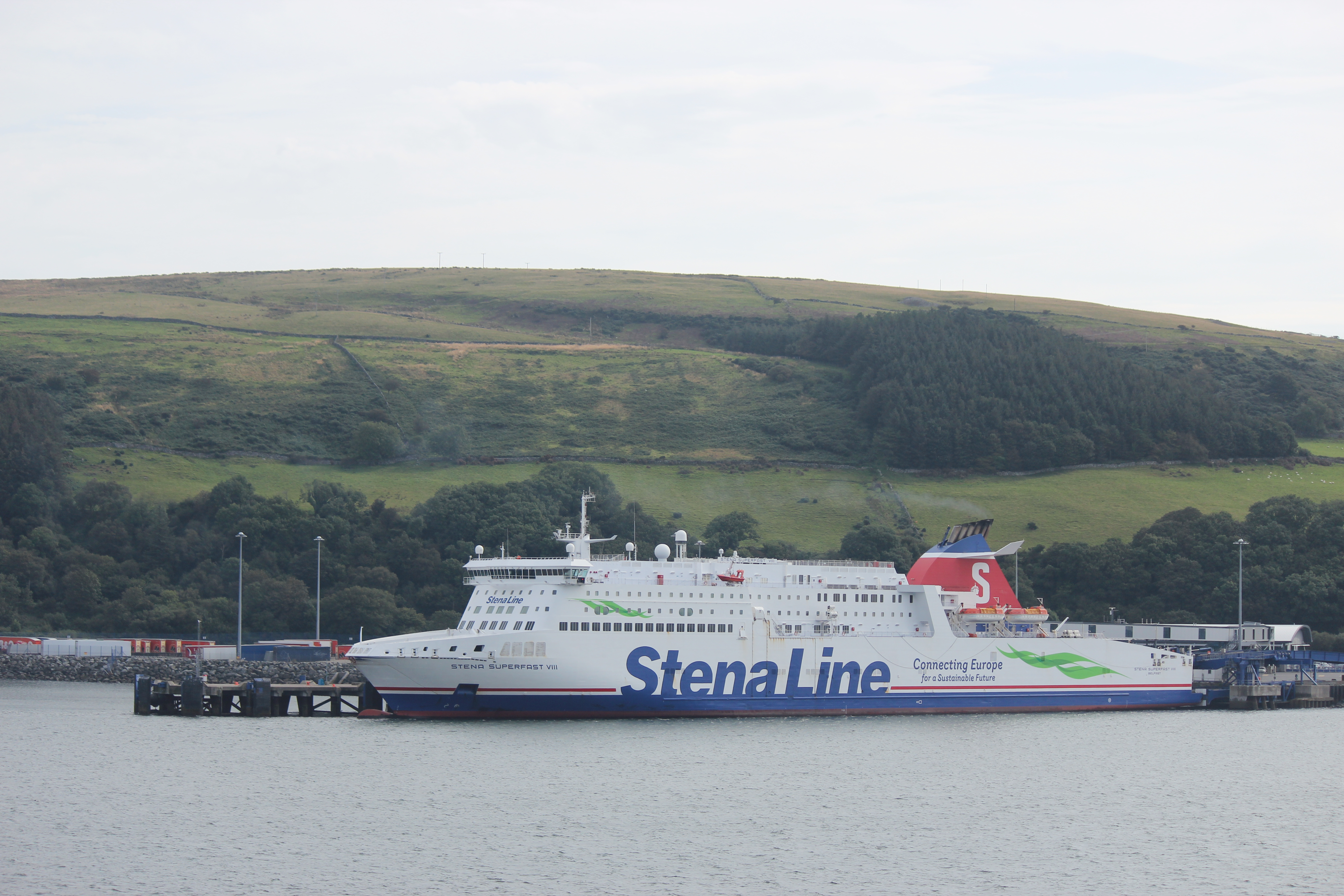
- Stena Superfast VIII at Cairnryan in August 2019

History
- Name: 2002-2011: Superfast VIII; 2011-present: Stena Superfast VIII
- Owner: 2002–06: Superfast Ferries; 2006–17: Tallink; 2017 onwards: Stena Line
- Operator: 2002 - 06: Superfast Ferries; 2006 - 11: Tallink; 2011 - onwards: Stena Line
- Port of registry: 2002–06: Piraeus, Greece; 2006–11: Paldiski, Estonia; 2011 onwards: Belfast, United Kingdom
- Route: Belfast–Cairnryan
- Builder: HDW, Kiel, Germany
- Yard number: 358
- Launched: 28 November 2000
- Acquired: 11 July 2001
- Maiden voyage: 15 July 2001
- In service: 15 July 2001
- Identification: IMO number: 9198953; Call sign: 2EZR4; MMSI number: 235089436
- Status: In service

General characteristics (as built)
- Class & type: Superfast VII class fast ropax ferry
- Tonnage: 30,285 GT
- Displacement: 5,990 t (5,900 long tons) deadweight (DWT)
- Length: 203.3 m (667 ft)
- Beam: 25.42 m (83 ft 5 in)
- Height: 40.00 m (131.23 ft)
- Draught: 6.60 m (21 ft 8 in)
- Decks: 10
- Ice class: 1 A Super
- Installed power: 4 × Wärtsilä-Sulzer NSD ZA V40S diesels; combined 46,000 kW (62,000 shp)
- Propulsion: 2 propellers; 2 bow thrusters; 1 stern thruster
- Speed: 30.4 kn (56.3 km/h; 35.0 mph)
- Capacity: 626 passengers; 661 cars; 1,920 lane meters

General characteristics (in Stena Service)
- Class & type: Superfast VII class fast ropax ferry
- Tonnage: 10769 Net Tonnage; 30285 Gross Tonnage
- Displacement: 13315 tonnes (light)
- Length: 203.3 m (667 ft)
- Beam: 25 m (82 ft 0 in)
- Draught: 6.6 m (21 ft 8 in)
- Depth: 9.1 m (29 ft 10 in)
- Deck clearance: 4.7 m, 5.2 m on central 4 lanes of the upper vehicle deck
- Installed power: 4 × Wärtsilä-Sulzer NSD ZA V40S main engines producing 11,500 kW each(total 46,000 kW (62,000 shp)), coupled to 2 × 5.2 m KaMeWa propellers via 2 × Schelde dual input single output gearboxes; 3 × MAN B&W 8L28/32H, producing a total of 1,848 kW each @ 510 rpm
- Propulsion: 2 × 5.2 m KaMeWa propellers; 3 × 925 kW KaMeWa bow thrusters; 1 × 1,350 kW stern thruster
- Speed: 20 kn (37.0 km/h; 23.0 mph) - 22 kn (40.7 km/h; 25.3 mph) Consumption: 50 tonnes at slow speed (16 - 18 knots), 75 tonnes at eco speed (19 - 21 knots)
- Capacity: 1,200 passengers; 661 cars or 110 trailers (or a mix of both); 1924 lane metres; 5920 Deadweight
- Crew: 65 - 80 (dependent on service requirements); 18 (Minimum Safe Manning)
- Notes: Entered Stena service along with her sister Stena Superfast VII on 21 November 2011.

Stena Superfast VIII is a fast Ro-Pax ferry owned and operated by Stena Line between Belfast and Cairnryan. The ship was built in 2001 by Howaldtswerke-Deutsche Werft (HDW), Kiel, Germany for Attica Group's subsidiary Superfast Ferries. She was sold to her current owners in 2017.

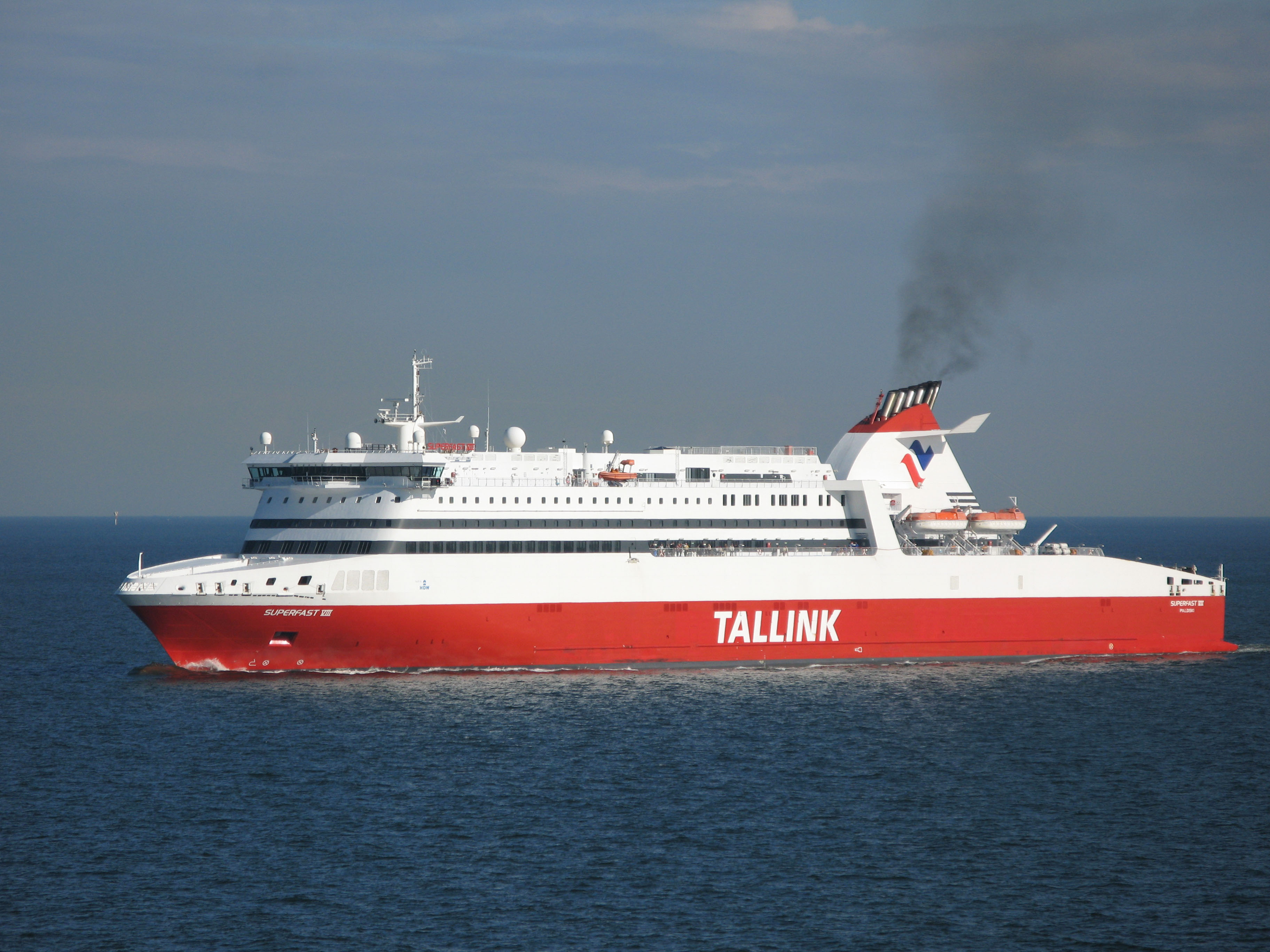
Superfast VIII near Helsinki, June 2007

In March 2006 Superfast sold its Baltic Sea operations to Tallink. Like her sisters, the Superfast VIII was moved from Finnish to Estonian registry, and her route changed to Hanko–Paldiski–Rostock from April 2006 onwards. The call at Paldiski proved to be impractical, and already in June of the same year the route reverted to Hanko–Rostock. Around this time the ship's hull markings were changed to "Superfast operated by Tallink". Although there were rumours that the ships would be moved under Silja Line's brand from January 2007 onwards, they were instead officially made a part of Tallink's fleet. At the same time their route changed to Tallinn–Helsinki–Rostock. Between 5 and 12 April 2007 the ship was used on the Helsinki–Tallinn route due to a delay in the delivery of the new Star. After this she joined her sisters in the Rostock service.

== Stena Line charter ==
In March 2011, Stena Line announced it would be chartering the Superfast VIII and sister ship Superfast VII. The vessels now operate on crossings of the North Channel separating Ireland and Britain; between Belfast and Cairnryan, at a new facility built by Stena Line called Loch Ryan Port. in February 2014, Stena renewed the charter of these ships until Autumn 2019. Stena Superfast VIII has been voted the top ship in the entire Stena Line fleet by Stena customers for both 2013 and 2014. More recently the ship has been voted top ship in both the Irish Sea fleet and the entire Stena fleet 2022.

== Conversion to day ferries ==
Before the two sister ships entered service for Stena Line, an extensive refurbishment/conversion overseen by Stena Ro-Ro and Knud E Hansen was undertaken at the Remontowa Shipyard in Gdańsk, Poland. This was rumoured at the time to have cost a total of €14M. As part of this conversion, the free height of the upper vehicle deck (deck 5) was raised to 5.05 m allowing Stena to carry full height freight. This included removing the passenger areas on deck 6, where there were areas such as a bar and a conference room. There still is a blue lift exit on deck 6, which only leads to the stairway. Both ships also received an additional bow thruster to improve manoeuvrability, taking their complement to 3 bow thrusters and 1 stern thruster.

As the new port in Scotland had a TTS automated mooring system installed, the ships were also adapted to work with this by adding three steel bollards on the starboard side bow. The conversion of the vessels and construction of the new port in Scotland were part of a £200m rolling investment in the route between Scotland and Northern Ireland. There were also 2 remote controlled arms installed at Belfast Victoria Terminal 4, which attach to the stern of each vessel.

== Refurbishment ==
During March 2015, some areas of Stena Superfast VIII were refurbished whilst the ship was dry docked at Harland and Wolff. Along with the entire Irish sea fleet (1 ship at a time), Superfast VIII will enter dry dock in April 2023 for extensive work to both the exterior and to the passenger accommodation, this dock will take place in Liverpool.

== Other information ==
Stena Superfast VIII is managed by Stena Line as of March 2023. Stena Line purchased the vessel in December 2017.
