= ANEK Lines =

Greek shipping company

- Traded as: Athex: ANEK
- Industry: Shipping; Transport
- Founded: 10 April 1967; 59 years ago
- Founder: Irineos Galanakis
- Fate: Merged with Attica Group
- Headquarters: Chania, Greece
- Area served: Adriatic Sea; Crete; Aegean islands Italy; Aegean Sea
- Key people: Georgios Katsanevakis (President); Yannis Vardinoyiannis (CEO)
- Products: Commercial, Passenger Transport and Cargo
- Revenue: €149.99 million (2021)
- Operating income: €17.04 million (2021)
- Net income: €(40.70) million (2021)
- Total assets: €280.91 million (2021)
- Total equity: €(40.48) million (2021)
- Number of employees: 670 (2021)
- Subsidiaries: Aigaion Pelagos Thalassies Grammes Shipping Company; ANEK Holdings (99.32%); ANEK Lines Italia (49%); ETANAP (31.9%); Lefka Ori (48.24%)
- Website: www.anek.gr
- Footnotes source for financial figure

ANEK Lines (Ανώνυμη Ναυτιλιακή Εταιρεία Κρήτης, Anonymi Naftiliaki Eteria Kritis, Anonymous Shipping Company of Crete) is one of the largest passenger shipping companies in Greece. It was founded in 1967 as a community-based company by residents of Crete. It operates passenger ferries, mainly on the Piraeus–Crete and Adriatic Sea routes.

In December 2023, ANEK Lines was acquired by Attica Group, continuing operations as the fourth cruise line subsidiary of Attica Group.

== Fleet ==
The ANEK Lines fleet is composed of six motor Ro-Ro/passenger ferries, of which three are in use, two on long-term charter, and one is laid up.

Ship name	Flag	Built	Entered Service	Gross tonnage	Length	Width	Passengers	Vehicles	Knots	Image
Asterion II	(Cyprus)	1991	2024	31,804 GT	192 m	27 m	1,020	840	21.5	
Asterion II	Former Ishikari and Grand Spring, transferred from Superfast Ferries.									
Kissamos	(Greece)	1992	2024	29,992 GT	192 m	27 m	1,790	780	24	
Kissamos	Former Blue Galaxy, transferred from Blue Star Ferries.									
Elyros	(Greece)	1998	2007	33,635 GT	192 m	27 m	1,880	620	24	
Elyros	Rebuilt ferry, originally built by Mitsubishi Heavy Industries, Shimonoseki, Japan, for the Piraeus–Chania route. Named after Elyrus.									

=== Laid up ===
Ship name	Flag	Built	Entered Service	Gross tonnage	Length	Width	Passengers	Vehicles	Knots	Image
Prevelis	(Greece)	1980	2000	15,354 GT	142.5 m	23.5 m	1,300	310	19	
Prevelis	Rebuilt ferry, originally built by Imbari Zosen, Imbari, Japan. Named after the Monastery of Preveli. Laid up in Elefsis waiting for demolition.									

=== On long-term charter to foreign companies ===
Ship name	Flag	Built	Gross tonnage	Length	Width	Passengers	Vehicles	Knots	Image
El. Venizelos	(Greece)	1984	38,261 GT	175.5 m	28.5 m	2,257	850	21	
El. Venizelos	Former Kydon II; large rebuilt ferry, with hull built in Stocznia im, Komuny Paryskiej, Gdynia, Poland, completed in 1992 at Perama, Piraeus, Greece, for Piraeus–Crete routes. Similar to Stena Line's Stena Vision and Stena Spirit, as well as the unfinished Regent Sky. Now on bareboat charter to Algérie Ferries.								
Kydon	(The Bahamas)	1990	29,991 GT	192 m	27 m	1,672	780	25	
Kydon	Former Sophocles V. On bareboat charter for Ferries del Caribe from 2017.								

== Former fleet ==
- Kydon 1968–1989 (scrapped)
- Candia 1973–2000 (scrapped in 2011 as Jabal Ali 1)
- Rethymnon 1973–2000 (scrapped in 2009 as Jabal Ali 2)
- Zakros 1977–1985 (scrapped)
- Kriti 1978–1996 (scrapped in 2004 as Express)
- Aptera 1985–2005 (scrapped in 2011 as Morning Sun)
- Lato 1987–2015 (scrapped in 2018 as Talaton)
- Lissos 1987–2011 (scrapped in 2011 at Alang, India)
- Talos 1995–1999 as Ierapetra L 2008–2015 (as Aqua Blue for Seajets since 2016)
- Kriti I 1996–2025 (sold for scrap in 2025)
- Kriti II 1996–2025 (sold for scrap in 2025)
- Arkadi 1999–2002 (sank as Pella for Arab Bridge Maritime Company in the Red Sea in 2011)
- Olympic Champion 2000–2023 (as Superfast III for Superfast Ferries since 2024)
- Hellenic Spirit 2001–2024 (as Superfast IV for Superfast Ferries since 2025)
- Coraggio 2012–2013 (as Athena Seaways for DFDS Seaways since 2013)
- Forza 2012–2016 (as Forza for Acciona Transmediterranea since 2016)
- Audacia 2013–2014 (as Rizhao Orient for a Chinese company since 2014)
- Norman Atlantic 2014–2014 (caught fire on 28 December 2014 near Corfu. Laid up for 4 years in Bari; scrapped in Aliaga in 2019)
- Asterion 2016–2018 (as Connemara for Brittany Ferries since 2018)
- Lefka Ori 2023–2024 then transferred to Superfast Ferries

== ANEK-Superfast ==
On 7 June 2011, ANEK Lines and Superfast Ferries created a joint venture for the Piraeus–Heraklion and the Patras–Igoumenitsa–Ancona routes. This involved two RO-PAX ships on the first route (the ANEK-owned Olympic Champion and the Superfast-owned Superfast XII) and three on the second route (the ANEK-owned Hellenic Spirit and the Superfast-owned Superfast VI and Superfast XI).

== Routes ==
- Greece domestic
  - Piraeus–Chania (Elyros and Kissamos)
  - Piraeus–Heraklio (Asterion II)

== Affiliates ==
ANEK Group comprises ANEK Lines, its subsidiaries, and companies in which it holds a minority stake greater than 10%:

- ANEK HOLDINGS S.A. (Greece, Crete - Chania): 99.5%, tourism, participation in other companies, consulting, etc.
- ΑΝΕΚ LINES ITALIA srl (Italy, Ancona): 49%, factoring and representation of shipping companies
- LANE S.A. (Lane Lines, Greece, Crete - Ag. Nikolaos): 50.11%, passenger ferry shipping
- AIGAION PELAGOS - THALASSIES GRAMMES SHIPPING COMPANY (Crete, Chania): 99.90%, sailing company under Law 959/79
- T.C. SAILING (Greece, Crete - Chania): 97.5% sailing company under Law 959/79
- ETANAP S.A. (Greece, Crete - Chania/Stylos): 50%, production and distribution of bottled water
- LEFKA ORI S.A. (Greece, Crete - Chania/Stylos): 62%, production and trade of plastic bottles and packaging products
- CHAMPION FERRIES Ltd (Marshall Islands): 70%, shipping

Former affiliates and investments:

- NEL Lines 16.5% (shares sold 2005 to Edgewater Holdings)
- DANE Sea Lines 41.87% (stopped operations in August 2004 after financial difficulties)
- RETHYMNIAKI (took over and finally merged into ANEK Lines in 1999)
- ANEN 19.36%

== Accidents and incidents ==
On 28 August 2018, at 23:45 (UTC+03:00), El. Venizelos, a ferry in ANEK's fleet, caught fire soon after leaving Piraeus for Chania, with 875 passengers and 140 crew members on board. The ferry was able to return to Piraeus with no injuries.
