= Prevelis =

Ship

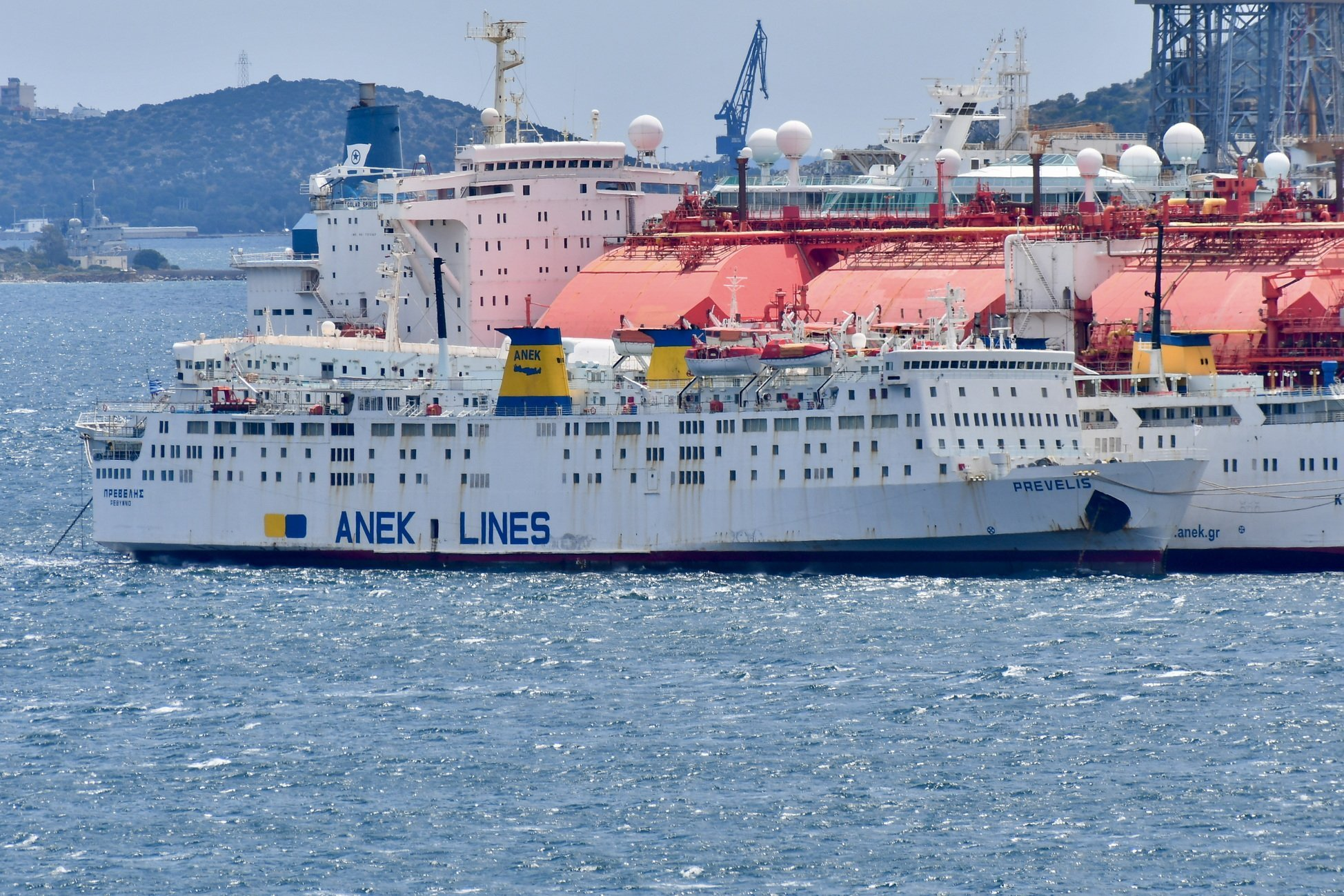
- Prevelis laid up in Eleusis

History

Greece
- Name: Ferry Orange No 2 (1980-1994); Preveli (1994-2000); Prevelis (2000-Present)
- Namesake: Preveli Monastery
- Owner: Shikoku Kaihatsu Ferry (1980-1994); Rethymniaki Naftiliaki SA (1994-1999); ANEK Lines (1999-Present)
- Operator: Shikoku Kaihatsu Ferry (1980-1994); Cretan Ferries (1994-1999); ANEK Lines (1999-Present)
- Port of registry: Rethymno, Greece
- Route: Piraeus–Milos-Santorini-Anafi-Heraklion-Sitia-Kasos-Karpathos-Halki-Rhodes
- Builder: Imabari Shipbuilding
- Yard number: 396
- Launched: 9 November 1980
- Completed: 1980
- Maiden voyage: 1980
- Identification: IMO number: 8020927; Call sign: SYDL; MMSI number: 239297000
- Status: Laid Up

General characteristics
- Type: Ro-pax ferry
- Tonnage: 15,354 GT; 3,300 DWT
- Length: 142.5 m (468 ft)
- Beam: 23.5 m (77 ft)
- Depth: 5.2 m (17 ft)
- Ramps: One
- Installed power: Two Pielstick-Ishakawajima-12PC2-5V diesel engines, 8,352 kW (combined)
- Speed: 20 knots
- Capacity: 991 passengers; 310 cars

Prevelis (Greek: Πρέβελης) is a Ro-Pax ferry, built in 1980 by Imabari Shipbuilding in Japan as Ferry Orange No 2 for Shikoku Kaihatsu Ferry (ja). On 27 December 1980 she was put into service on the Toyo - Osaka route. In 1994, she was bought by Rethymniaki Naftiliaki SA and was named Preveli after Preveli Monastery. Following a refit in Perama, she started to operate on the Piraeus - Rethymno route. After the 1999 acquisition of Rethymniaki by ANEK Lines, Prevelis operates in the colors of ANEK.

== History ==
=== Origins and construction ===
At the end of 1980, the Shikoku Kaihatsu Ferry company considered building a fourth vessel to strengthen its services between Osaka and Saijō on the island of Shikoku . This new ship was planned to be larger than its predecessors, particularly with its garage occupying a larger area.

Built by the Imabari Zōsen shipyards, the ship, named Ferry Orange No. 2 , was laid down on 5 septembre 1980 and launched on 9 novembre. After a month and a half of finishing work, it was delivered to Shikoku Kaihatsu on December 23 1980.

== Service ==
=== Shikoku Kaihatsu Ferry (1980-1994) ===
The Orange Ferry No. 2 is put into service on the 27th of December 1980 between Osaka and Saijō. It operates its rotations in tandem with the Orange Ferry .

In the 1990s, Shikoku Kaihatsu considered replacing its existing fleet with larger, newer vessels. In 1994, after a career of approximately fourteen years without any significant incidents, the Orange No. 2 ferry was superseded by the new Orange 7. The vessel was then withdrawn from service and sold in July to the Greek company Rethymniaki Naftiliaki Touristiki.

=== Rethymniaki Naftiliaki Touristiki (1994-2000) ===
Once received by its new owner, the ship was renamed Preveli . It arrived in Greece on September of 1994. At the end of its long voyage from Japan, it entered the Perama shipyards to be refitted for its future assignment. During the work, significant modifications were made on board; the interior layout was completely redesigned, and the upper car deck was removed and replaced with cabins. Safety features were also enhanced with the addition of lifeboats.

Once the modifications are complete, the ship enters service in décembre 1994 on the routes between Piraeus and Rethymnon, in Crete, under the colors of the company Cretan Ferries. In 2000, the company Rethymniaki Naftiliaki was bought by the company ANEK Lines, the ship then joined the fleet of the Cretan shipowner.

=== ANEK Lines (since 2000) ===
Transferred to the ANEK Lines fleet, the ship was renamed Prevelis . Retained on its original route between Piraeus and Rethymno, it was also used on crossings to Heraklion and the Dodecanese archipelago .

In 27 septembre 2006 the ship ran aground near Rethymnon, but manages to free itself under its own power.

From juin 2008 Prevelis is assigned to the combined service of Crete and the Cyclades from Piraeus.

== Facilities ==
The Prevelis has 9 decks. While the ship actually spans 10 decks, one is absent at the garage level to allow the ship to carry cargo. Passenger accommodations occupy decks 4, 5, 6, and 7, while deck 3 houses the garage.

=== Common areas ===
During its career under the Japanese flag, little is known about the ship's facilities. Like other Japanese ships of its time, the Orange Ferry No. 2 was probably equipped with a dining area, a lounge, and public baths.

Since the 1994 renovations, the Prevelis has been equipped on deck 6 with a lounge bar, a restaurant, a self-service restaurant and a swimming pool on deck 7.

== Features ==
The Prevelis is 142.47 meters long and 23.50 meters wide. Its original tonnage was 5,683 GT before being increased to 15,354 GT after the 1994 refit. In its initial configuration, it could carry 604 passengers and had a spacious 900-meter-long cargo garage capable of holding about 100 vehicles. Since 1996, it has been able to accommodate 1,600 passengers and 450 vehicles. It was initially accessible via two ramp doors, two axial doors located at the stern , and one at the bow . Since its acquisition by the Greek flag, the bow door has been sealed. The Prevelis is powered by two Pielstick-IHI 12PC2-5V diesel engines, each producing 11,750 kW, driving two propellers that propel the vessel at a speed of 20 knots. It is also equipped with a bow thruster and a roll stabilizer. At the time, safety equipment consisted primarily of life rafts, but also included a semi-rigid rescue boat. Since 1994, the ship has been equipped with four medium-sized, enclosed lifeboats.

== Routes served ==
For the company, the Orange Ferry No. 2 served the inter-island routes between Ōsaka and Saijō on the island of Shikoku .

From 1994, under the colors of Cretan Ferries, the ship provided sailings to Crete between Piraeus and Rethymno .

When the ship was transferred to the ANEK Lines fleet, it served, in addition to its main assignment, the city of Heraklion and the Dodecanese archipelago .

Since 2008, the Prevelis has been primarily used for connections linking Piraeus to Crete, the Cyclades and the Dodecanese.

From 11 April to 14 September 2008 it operated on the Piraeus - Paros - Naxos - Ios - Santorini - Syros route . In the following years it mainly operated on the Piraeus - Rethymno connections.

From the first months of 2023 it operates on the connections between Piraeus, Milos, Santorini, Anafi, Heraklion, Sitia, Kasos,Karpathos, Halki and Rhodes.

Laid up since early 2025 in the Eleusis area, it has remained there possibly waiting to be scrapped.

== Accidents and Incidents ==
=== 2014 grounding (Santorini) ===
The vessel ran aground off the islet of Aspronisi while attempting to enter the port of Santorini. The ship was arriving from Piraeus with 190 passengers on board when the incident occurred, which initial reports suggest may have been caused by a sudden loss of power.

An underwater hull inspection by divers revealed no damage, and the ferry was able to proceed to Santorini under its own power. No injuries, structural damage, or marine pollution were reported.

==== 2017 water ingress ====
The vessel experienced water ingress in its engine room while transiting the Saronic Gulf near Saint George Island, Greece. At the time of the incident, the ship was carrying 127 passengers and 67 crew members. The crew successfully brought the flooding under control and immediately alerted maritime authorities.

The Hellenic Coast Guard dispatched three patrol vessels to escort the ferry as it returned to the port of Piraeus under its own power. No injuries, structural damage, or marine pollution were reported. Local authorities detained the vessel in port until necessary repairs are fully completed.

===== 2019 collision (Kasos) =====
On 24 November 2019, during the morning hours, Prevelis struck the pier at the port of Kasos during mooring maneuvers. The impact caused damage to a section of the protective metallic rubbing strake on the stern plating above the waterline.

The ship, executing a scheduled itinerary from Rhodes to Chalki, Diafani, Karpathos, Kasos, Siteia, Heraklion, Anafi, Santorini, Milos, and Piraeus, safely docked at the port. At the time of the incident, it was carrying 220 passengers, 33 cars, 27 trucks, and 1 motorcycle. No injuries or marine pollution were reported.

The Kasos Port Authority initially issued a detention order for the vessel. However, after its classification society presented a class maintenance certificate, the ferry was cleared to depart and continue its voyage. Upon arriving at the port of Siteia, the ship underwent a secondary inspection by the local Ship Inspection Team of Ierapetra. Following the presentation of a corresponding class maintenance certificate from its classification society, the vessel was permitted to sail and complete the remainder of its itinerary.

===== 2020 collision (Santorini) =====
On 6 June 2020, during the early morning hours, Prevelis struck the dock at the "Fanaraki" position within the port of Athinios in Santorini during mooring maneuvers. The ferry was operating its scheduled itinerary from Piraeus to Milos, Santorini, Anafi, Heraklion, Siteia, Kasos, Karpathos, Diafani, Chalki, and Rhodes.

The collision resulted in minor abrasions on the port side of the hull, extending across an area of 4.00 meters at a height of 1.00 meter above the waterline. No injuries or marine pollution were reported.

The Santorini Port Authority initially issued a detention order for the vessel. However, following the presentation of a class maintenance certificate by its classification society, the Prevelis was cleared to resume its scheduled voyage with 104 passengers, 20 cars, 10 trucks, and 3 motorcycles on board.

===== 2020 grounding (Karpathos) =====
On 9 November 2020, during the midday hours, Prevelis ran aground in a sandy area just outside the port of Diafani in Karpathos due to adverse weather conditions during docking maneuvers. The ferry was operating a scheduled itinerary from Rhodes to Chalki, Diafani, Pigadia, Kasos, Siteia, Heraklion, Anafi, Santorini, Milos, and Piraeus, carrying 109 passengers, 9 trucks, 27 cars, and 7 motorcycles.

The vessel successfully refloated under its own power and, escorted by the tugboat Christos XXVII, returned to the port of Rhodes. Upon arrival, 48 passengers safely disembarked, while the crew ensured accommodations and meals on board for the remaining 61 passengers.

The Central Port Authority of Rhodes issued a detention order for Prevelis until a certificate of seaworthiness is provided by its classification society. The shipowner assumed responsibility for rerouting the passengers to their final destinations.

===== 2021 collision (Anafi) =====
On 9 August 2021, during the morning hours, the vessel struck the breakwater of Anafi Island. The ship subsequently sailed to the port of Athinios in Santorini carrying 395 passengers. During an inspection at the port, officials discovered three breaches in the forward collision bulkhead (bulbous bow): one on the port side and two on the starboard side.

The Santorini Port Authority initially issued a detention order. However, after the ship's classification society presented certificates of seaworthiness and class maintenance, the vessel was cleared to depart for a single voyage to the port of Milos, carrying 227 passengers, 32 trucks, 37 cars, and 8 motorcycles, with Piraeus as its final destination.

A preliminary investigation is being conducted by the Santorini Port Authority. No injuries or marine pollution were reported as a result of the incident.

===== 2021 collision (Santorini) =====
On 2 October 2021, during the morning hours, the vessel struck the dock at Athinios port in Santorini. An inspection by the local Ship Inspection Team revealed hull abrasions above the waterline on the starboard quarter, while an underwater survey by a private diver confirmed that all four blades of the starboard propeller had been sheared off.

The ship arrived at the port carrying 193 passengers, 35 trucks, 38 cars, and 9 motorcycles. Of these, 74 passengers and 33 vehicles disembarked at Santorini. For the remaining travelers, 88 passengers bound for Heraklion and Anafi were scheduled for transfer to alternative vessels, while the remaining 31 passengers were rerouted under the care of the shipowner.

The Santorini Port Authority launched a preliminary investigation and detained the vessel until its classification society issues a certificate of seaworthiness. No injuries, water ingress, or marine pollution were reported.
