= MS Talaton =

Scrapped ferry

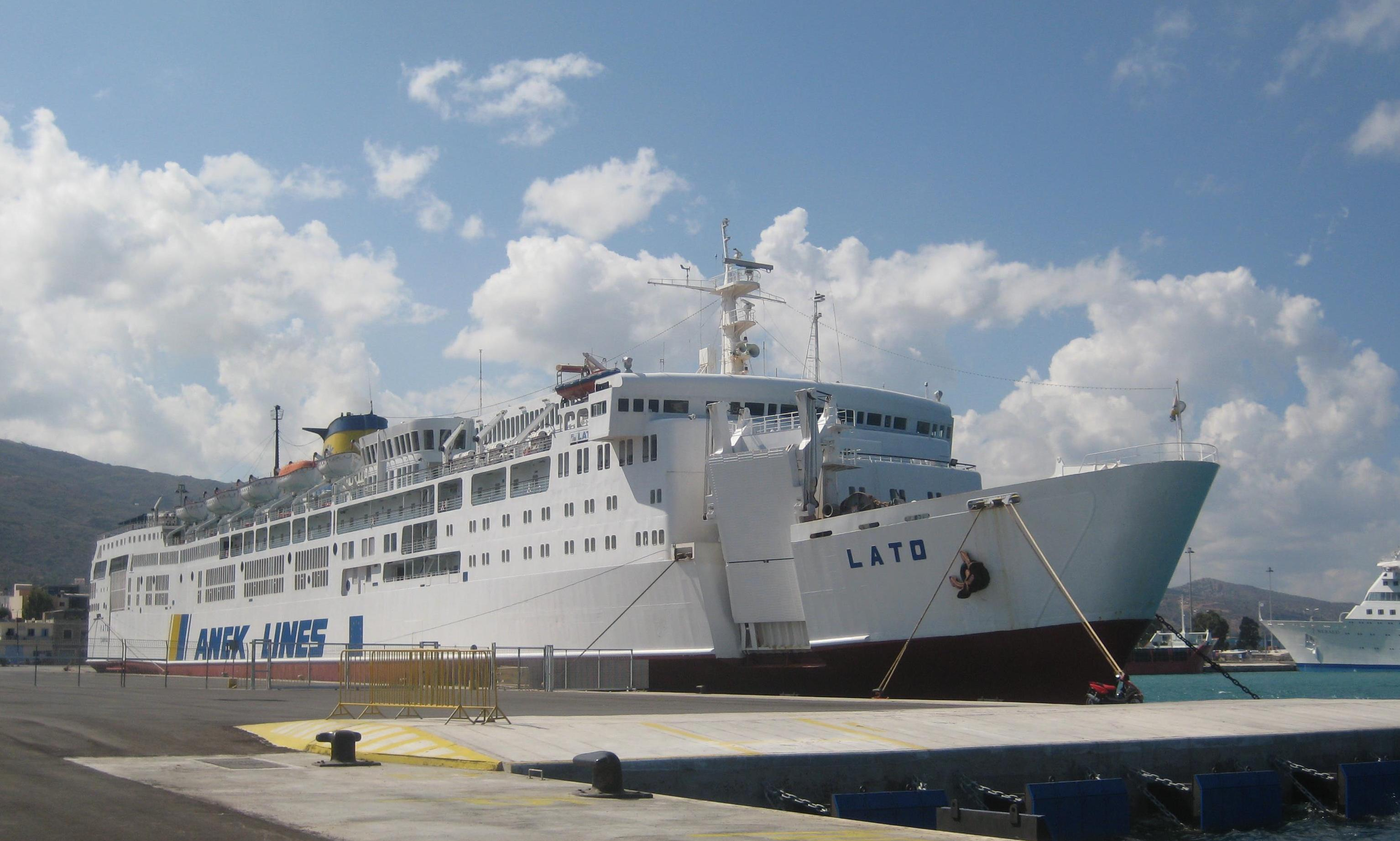
- Lato in Herakleion

History
- Name: 1975–1985: Daisetsu; 1985–1987: Varuna; 1987–2015: Lato; 2015–2016: Platon; 2016–2017: Laton; 2017–2018: Talaton
- Owner: 1975–1985: Taiheiyo Enkai Zosen KK; 1985–1987: Higashi Nihon Ferry; 1987–2015: ANEK Lines; 2015–2016: Global Marketing Systems; 2016–2017: Laton Shipping SA; 2017–2018: Seajets
- Operator: 1975–1985: Taiheiyo Enkai Zosen KK; 1985–1987: Higashi Nihon Ferry; 1987–2015: ANEK Lines; 2017–2018: Seajets
- Port of registry: Nagoya, Japan (1975–1987); Chania, Greece (1987–2015); Kingstown, Saint Vincent and the Grenadines (2015–2016); Basseterre, Saint Kitts and Nevis (2016); Nassau, Bahamas (2016–2017); Moroni, Comoros (2017–2018)
- Route: Piraeus ↔ Chania
- Builder: Naikai Zosen Yards; Onomichi, Japan
- Yard number: 388
- Laid down: 20 September 1974
- Launched: 28 March 1975
- Completed: 20 June 1975
- Acquired: 1987
- Maiden voyage: June 1975
- In service: June 1975
- Out of service: June 2014
- Identification: IMO number: 7394759; Call sign: SZOJ
- Fate: Scrapped at Aliağa, Turkey, in June 2018.
- Status: Scrapped

General characteristics
- Class & type: Ro-Pax Ferry
- Tonnage: 15,404 tsl; 9,446 tsn; 5,432 tpl
- Length: 188.4 m (618 ft 1 in)
- Beam: 23.98 m (78 ft 8 in)
- Draft: 7.2 m (23 ft 7 in)
- Installed power: 2 × MAN-Mitsubishi V7V 52/55 diesel engines (total 20,594 kW)
- Speed: 21.5 knots (39.8 km/h; 24.7 mph)
- Capacity: 1,564 passengers (278 cabins); 850 cars or 1,200 lane metres
- Crew: 70

Talaton, previously named Daisetsu, Varuna, Lato, was a Japanese-built Ro-Pax ferry best known as a flagship vessel for the Greek shipping line ANEK Lines. Launched in 1975 by Naikai Zosen in Setoda as Daisetsu for Taiheiyo Enkai Ferry, the vessel was lengthened in 1980 and acquired in 1987 by ANEK Lines, which undertook a major multi-year conversion before placing her on Mediterranean routes—most prominently connecting Piraeus and Chania on the island of Crete for nearly two decades. After retiring in 2014 and spending her final years laid up under various temporary names, she was towed to Aliağa, Turkey, and scrapped in June 2018.

== History ==
=== Origins and construction ===
In 1972, the Taiheiyō Enkai Ferry company began operations between Nagoya and the island of Kyūshū. The service was inaugurated using the car ferry Arkas, joined the following year by its sister ship, the Albireo, before both vessels were deployed in April on routes to Hokkaido. Seeking to expand its service on this route, the shipping company ordered two additional vessels at the end of 1973.

Based on the design of the two previous ships, the future vessels are planned to be larger, measuring 175 meters long and 23 meters wide. Like their predecessors, their design is geared more towards freight transport. Their passenger capacity is even slightly lower, while their towing capacity is increased. Nevertheless, they will be able to carry approximately 900 passengers in comfort superior to that of most Japanese ships, with first-class cabins and second-class berths and dormitories. The common areas will consist primarily of a panoramic lounge, a restaurant, and public baths. As with their predecessors, their construction will be carried out by the Naikai Zōsen shipyards. The first of these, named Ishikari, was launched in September 1974.

The second ship, named Daisetsu, was laid down at Setoda on September 20, 1974, the day after the launch of its sister ship. The ship was launched on March 28, 1975 and delivered after finishing touches on June 20 to Taiheiyō Enkai Ferry.

=== Service ===
==== Taiheiyō Enkai Ferry/Taiheiyō Ferry (1975–1985) ====
The Daisetsu begins its commercial service in June 1975, between Nagoya, Sendai and Tomakomai. In 1980, the ship's hull was lengthened by 12.50 meters during a jumboization operation. This increased the trucking capacity by 6%, allowing the loading of 14 additional trucks.

In 1982, Taiheiyō Enkai Ferry, facing significant financial difficulties, ceased operations. Its assets and fleet were then transferred to the new company Taiheiyō Ferry. In January 1985, the company determined that three ships were sufficient to maintain the service. The Daisetsu was therefore sold to the Higashi Nihon Ferry company.

==== Higashi Nihon Ferry (1985-1987) ====
Delivered to its new owner, the ship was renamed Varuna. After some modifications, including the addition of a side ramp at the bow, the ship began its rotations on March 16, 1985, still between Honshū and Hokkaidō, but this time on the Ōarai - Muroran line. Replaced in 1987 by the new Varuna, the ship was sold to the Greek company ANEK Lines.

==== ANEK Lines (1987-2016) ====
Renamed Lato, the ship left Japan after refueling in Yokohama on May 8, 1987, to reach Greece. After crossing the Indian Ocean, it passed through the Suez Canal from the 23rd to August 25, then arriving at its destination a few days later.

The ship then underwent significant transformations, including the addition of several blocks on the upper decks to create new cabins and the refurbishment of existing spaces. The work continued until 1989. Once the modifications were completed, the Lato entered service in 1989 between Greece and Italy. The ship was then the flagship of the ANEK Lines company until the arrival of the El. Venizelos in 1992. From that same year, the rival company Minoan Lines put its sister ship, the former Ishikari, into service on the same route, becoming the Erotokritos. However, the latter did not undergo the extensive modifications of its twin and remained in a configuration quite close to its original state. From 1997, the Lato was replaced by the Kriti I and Kriti II and positioned accordingly between Piraeus and Crete.

On March 16, 2007, the ship collided with the quay in Heraklion while attempting to dock in rough weather. Despite minor damage, it was immobilized for a few days for repairs. That same year, it was chartered in June by the Algerian National Navigation Company (CNAN), which operated it between Algeria and France. In August, its service was interrupted due to engine trouble, requiring its return to Perama for repairs. It subsequently resumed service to Crete. During the summer of 2012, it sailed between Italy and Albania as part of a partnership between ANEK Lines and the Stea Group company.

Scheduled to be chartered during the summer of 2014 by the Sardinian consortium GoInSardinia, the ship suffered engine trouble shortly before its scheduled commissioning, leading to the cancellation of the charter. It was nevertheless used in August to house the Libyan government in Tobruk at the start of the Second Libyan Civil War. Back in Greece, on September 6, the Lato is decommissioned at Perama. Scheduled to join the Alang shipbreaking yard in India in 2015, the ship will remain immobilized due to a project to convert it into a cruise ship by the city of Souda which will not, however, come to fruition.

==== Seajets (2016-2018) ====
In February 2016, the Lato was sold to Laton Shipping SA. Renamed Laton, it was initially registered in Saint Kitts and Nevis, then in the Bahamas. Despite a dry-docking and some onboard repairs, the ship remained unlaunched. In 2017, it was renamed Talaton. A final project to convert it into a floating hotel operated by SeaJets was briefly considered, then abandoned. The ship was eventually sold for scrap in June 2018. It left Pérama in tow on June 18, destined for the Aliağa construction site in Turkey, which it reached on June 20.

== Facilities ==
The Lato had 10 decks. While the ship actually spanned 11 decks, one was omitted at the car deck level to allow the ship to carry cargo. The decks are designated alphabetically from highest to lowest (except for the highest, called Sky). Passenger quarters occupied Sky, A, and B decks, while the forward section of A deck and the aft section of C deck were reserved for the crew. E, D, and C decks housed the car decks.

=== Common areas ===
Despite its design geared towards freight transport, the Daisetsu was originally equipped with comfortable passenger facilities such as a two-story lounge and a Japanese-style restaurant and public baths. During the 1987-1989 refit, following the acquisition of the ship by ANEK Lines, the layout was largely modified. A restaurant, a self-service restaurant and a lounge bar were added to B deck, and a nightclub, a lounge and a lido bar with a swimming pool were installed on Sky deck. A shop, a casino and a sauna were also available to passengers.

=== Cabins ===
During the ship's time in Japan, the facilities were divided into two classes. First-class cabins of varying sizes were mainly located on B deck. Second class offered mostly berths, but also dormitory-style accommodations on D deck. Between 1987 and 1989, the work undertaken by ANEK Lines resulted in a major overhaul of the cabins. Most of the second-class facilities were removed and replaced with private four-berth cabins, most of which had en-suite facilities. Additional cabins were added on A Deck. A few dormitories were retained on D Deck, and a lounge area with armchairs was created on C Deck.

== Features ==
The Lato originally measured 175.60 meters long and 23.98 meters wide, with a tonnage of 11,879 GT. Following a refit in 1980, it was lengthened by 12.50 meters, increasing its length to 188.40 meters and its tonnage to 12,709 GT. This tonnage ultimately reached 25,460 GT after the 1987-1989 refit. In its initial configuration, it could carry 905 passengers and had a spacious garage that could hold 130 trailers and 105 vehicles, later increased to 156 trailers and 100 cars after the 1980 refit. From 1989 onward, it could accommodate 1,564 passengers and 850 vehicles. The garage was initially accessible via three ramp doors: two axial doors located at the bow and stern, and a side door located on the starboard stern. In 1985, a side door was added to the starboard bow. The Lato was powered by two Mitsubishi-MAN V7V 52/55 diesel engines, developing 20,594 kW of power and driving two propellers, propelling the vessel at a speed of 21.5 knots. It was also equipped with a bow thruster and a roll stabilizer. At the time, safety equipment consisted primarily of life rafts and a rigid inflatable rescue boat (RIB). From 1989 onward, the ship was equipped with four medium-sized open lifeboats and two medium-sized enclosed lifeboats.

== Routes served ==
At the beginning of its career, the Daisetsu served the inter-island routes of Taiheiyō Enkai Ferry and later Taiheiyō Ferry between the Pacific coast of Honshū and Hokkaido on the Nagoya - Sendai - Tomakomai route. From 1985 onwards, it was assigned to the Ōarai - Muroran route for the Higashi Nihon Ferry company.

From 1989, under the colors of ANEK Lines, the Lato was initially assigned between Greece and Italy on the Patras - Igoumenitsa - Corfu - Ancona route before being operated in 1997 between Piraeus and Chania in Crete until 2014.

The Lato also sailed between Algeria and France on the Algiers - Marseille route under charter by CNAN during the summer of 2007, and also between Italy and Albania on the Bari - Durrës route during the summer of 2012.
