= Superfast III (2024) =

Greek ropax ferry

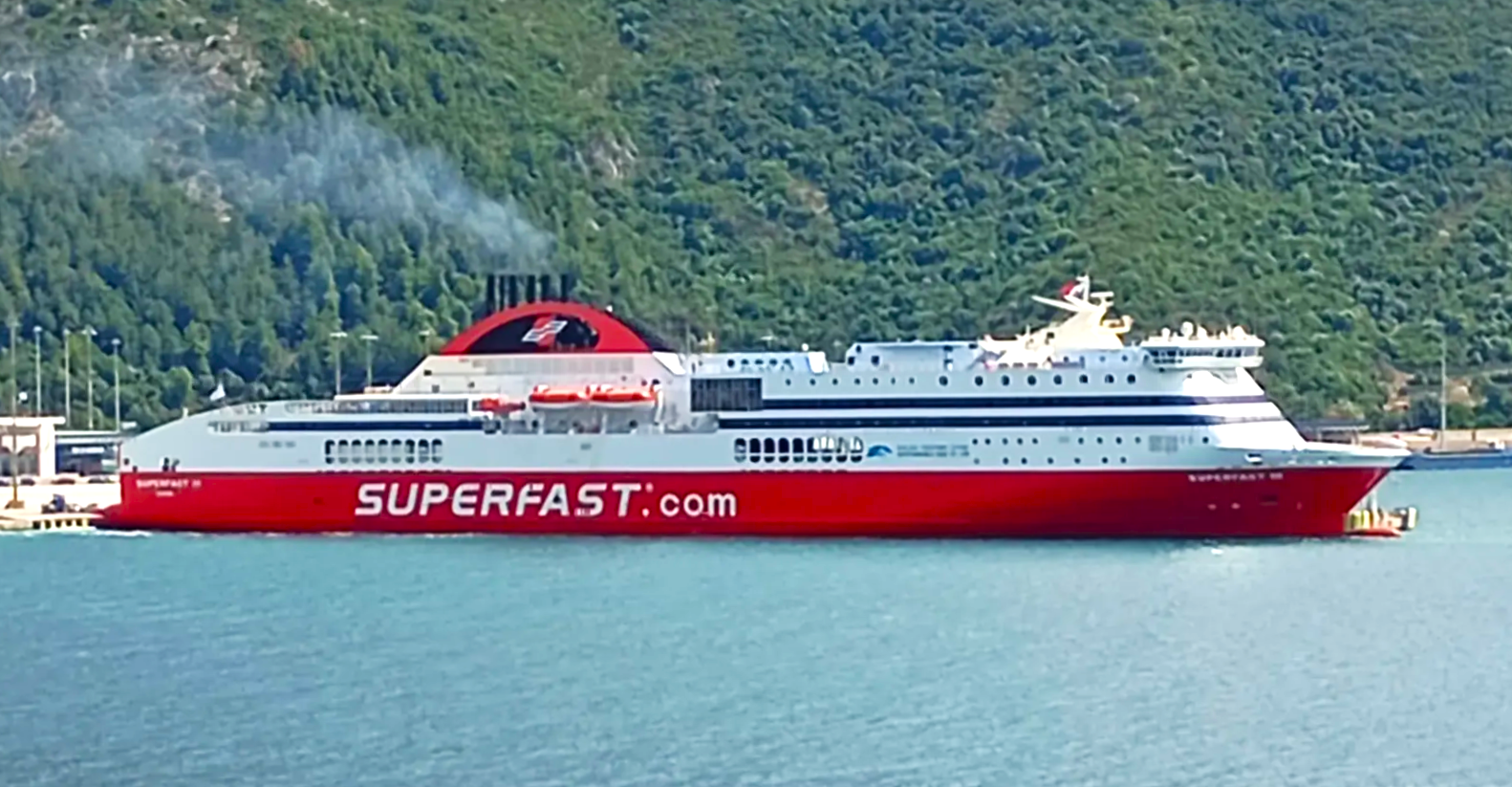
- Superfast III in Igoumenitsa

History

Greece
- Name: Intended name: Kriti III; 2000-2024: Olympic Champion; 2024–present: Superfast III
- Owner: ANEK Lines (2000–2023); Attica Group (2023–present)
- Operator: ANEK Lines (2000–2024); Superfast Ferries (2024–present)
- Port of registry: Chania, Greece
- Builder: Fosen Mekaniske Verksteder, Norway
- Yard number: 69
- Launched: 14 April 2000
- Completed: October 2000
- Identification: IMO number: 9216028; MMSI: 237280000; Call sign: SYWD
- Status: In service

General characteristics
- Type: Ro-pax ferry
- Tonnage: 32,694 GT
- Length: 204.0 m (669.3 ft)
- Beam: 25.8 m (85 ft)
- Draft: 6.7 m (22 ft)
- Propulsion: 4 × Wärtsilä 12V46C diesel engines
- Speed: 27 knots (service); 30 knots (max)
- Capacity: 1,833 passengers; 670 cars (1,560 lane meters)

Superfast III (Greek: Σουπερφαστ III, Souperfast III) is a fast ferry owned by the Greek company Superfast Ferries. Built between 1999 and 2000 at the Swedish shipyard Brucen in Landskrona and completed at the Norwegian shipyard Fosen Mekaniske Verksteder in Rissa, it was originally named Olympic Champion (Greek: Ολύμπικ Τσάμπιον, Olýmpik Tsámpion) and was the first new ship ordered by the company ANEK Lines . It entered service in November 2000. At the time, it sailed on the Cretan company's routes between Greece and Italy and occasionally between Piraeus and Crete. Following the acquisition of ANEK by the Attica group at the end of 2023, it was transferred in February 2024 to the Superfast Ferries fleet.

== History ==
=== Origins and construction ===
In the late 1990s, the ferry routes between Greece and Italy were largely dominated by Superfast Ferries and Minoan Lines. Since 1995 and the arrival of Superfast and its two high-speed vessels, the two shipping companies have been engaged in a veritable speed race, characterized by the successive commissioning of imposing vessels capable of carrying a large number of passengers at speeds of around 27 knots. Meanwhile, the Cretan company ANEK Lines, a long-standing competitor of Minoan Lines on the Greek-Italian routes, found itself at a significant disadvantage in this new development. Despite a high-performing fleet, strengthened in 1997 with the arrival of the sister ships Kriti I and Kriti II, and including the gigantic ferry El. Venizelos, ANEK Lines was unable to gain the upper hand in terms of speed, the main advantage of its rivals. It is this situation that will encourage the Cretan company to place an order for two twin fast ships with characteristics similar to those of the Superfast and Minoan units.

Initially named Kriti III and Kriti IV, the future ships were ordered from the Swedish shipbuilder Shipyard Brucen, which had designed and built the fast ferries for Minoan Lines a few years earlier. The future ANEK Lines vessels would draw heavily on these designs. Their design was essentially a more refined version of the sister ships Ikarus Palace and Pasiphae Palace, with a similar appearance and an almost identical layout. However, some differences would appear, such as the more circular portholes and side hatches, as well as the choice of a more powerful propulsion system, necessary to guarantee a speed of 27 knots. Despite a design more oriented towards the mixed-use vessel model, passenger and vehicle capacity would take precedence over freight capacity, which was limited to only 90 trailers—a very small amount considering the space allocated to the garage.

The Kriti III, the first new ship ordered by ANEK Lines, was laid down in Landskrona on September 14, 1999 Launched on April 14, 2000.Its hull was then transported to the Fosen Mekaniske Verksteder shipyard in Rissa, Norway, where the finishing touches were completed. After six months of work, the ship was delivered to ANEK Lines on October 17, 2000 under the name Olympic Champion.

== Service ==
After leaving Norway to join Greece, the Olympic Champion was put into service on November 15, 2000 between Patras, Igoumenitsa and Ancona. In May 2001 It is joined by its sister ship, the Hellenic Spirit. The arrival of the two ships allows ANEK Lines to maintain its position with its competitors.

In February 2011 the ship, like several other units in the fleet, was chartered by the Chinese government to evacuate their citizens from Libya, then gripped by a violent civil war. The Olympic Champion made two voyages between Benghazi and Heraklion between the 24th and the February 27, together with its sister-ship, enabling the evacuation of 4,500 Chinese workers who had disembarked in Greece so that they could return to China by plane.

On September 28, 2019, shortly after the ship left Igoumenitsa bound for Venice, a fire broke out in the upper deck. The order was given to return to port. Back at the dock, the 538 passengers were evacuated while the crew and firefighters worked to extinguish the flames. The fire was quickly brought under control thanks to the immediate activation of the ship's safety systems.

In 2024, following the acquisition of Anek Lines by Attica Group, the ferry changed its name and livery to Superfast and became Superfast III. Her sister ship, Hellenic Spirit, will follow the same fate. Today it operates regularly on the Ancona - Igoumenitsa - Patras line.

== Facilities ==
The Olympic Champion has 11 decks. While the ship actually spans 12 decks, one is absent, serving as a garage to allow for cargo transport. Passenger quarters are located on decks 6, 7, 8, 9, and 10, while crew quarters occupy deck 11. Decks 2, 3, 4, and 6 house the garages.

=== Common areas ===
Designed for long voyages, the Olympic Champion has comfortable facilities including, mostly on deck 9, a lounge bar located amidships on the port side, a restaurant on the forward port side, a self-service restaurant on the forward starboard side, a fast food area at the stern, a nearby pool bar, a shopping arcade and a nightclub on deck 10.

=== Cabins ===
The Olympic Champion has 808 berths distributed among approximately 100 private cabins, mostly located on decks 6, 7, 8, and 10, towards the front of the ship. These cabins, either inside or outside, can accommodate up to four people and all have private bathrooms with shower, toilet, and sink. Some of these are suites located on deck 10. A lounge with armchairs is also available at the rear of deck 8.

== Features ==
The Olympic Champion is 204.65 meters long and 26.12 meters wide, with a draft of 6.75 meters and a gross tonnage of 32,694 GT. The ship can accommodate 1,850 passengers and has a 2,200-meter roll-off garage with space for 654 vehicles, accessible via two aft ramps. It is powered by four Wärtsilä-NSD 12V46C diesel engines, producing 50,400 kW of power, driving two controllable-pitch propellers that propel the vessel at speeds exceeding 27 knots. The ship is also equipped with two bow thrusters and a roll stabilizer with two retractable fins. The vessel carries four large, enclosed lifeboats, a rigid inflatable boat, and numerous inflatable rafts.

== Routes served ==
Since entering service, the Olympic Champion has primarily sailed between Greece and Italy on the Patras - Igoumenitsa - Ancona route. It also occasionally serves the port of Venice and the routes connecting Piraeus and Crete.
