= Anafi Airport =

Airport serving the island of Anafi, Greece

Anafi Municipal Airport
- IATA: none; ICAO: none

Summary
- Airport type: Public
- Owner: Greek State
- Serves: Anafi
- Coordinates: 36°21′56″N 25°44′01″E

Map
- Location of airport in Greece

Runways
| Direction | Length | | Surface |
| Direction | ft | m | Surface |
|---|---|---|---|
| | 2,822 | 860 | Asphalt |
- Source: News agencies

Anafi Municipal Airport (Greek: Δημοτικός Αερολιμένας Ανάφης) is an airport currently under construction on the island of Anafi in the Cyclades islands region of Greece. Located approximately 5 km (3.1 mi) west of the island's principal town Chora, the Greek government approved its construction in 2004, primarily to hasten the transfer of injured or sick patients to surrounding islands. Formerly, slow passage via ferry was required.

The airport was expected to be finished by the end of 2023 but as of 12 April 2026 no completion date has been announced. The mayor of Anafi stated, "Οι εκτιμήσεις για την ολοκλήρωσή του δεν μπορούν να είναι ασφαλείς, γιατί μιλάμε για ένα σημαντικό έργο." (transl. Estimates for its completion cannot be safe, because we are talking about an important project.)

== See also ==
- Transport in Greece
