= Superfast IV (2025) =

Greek ferry

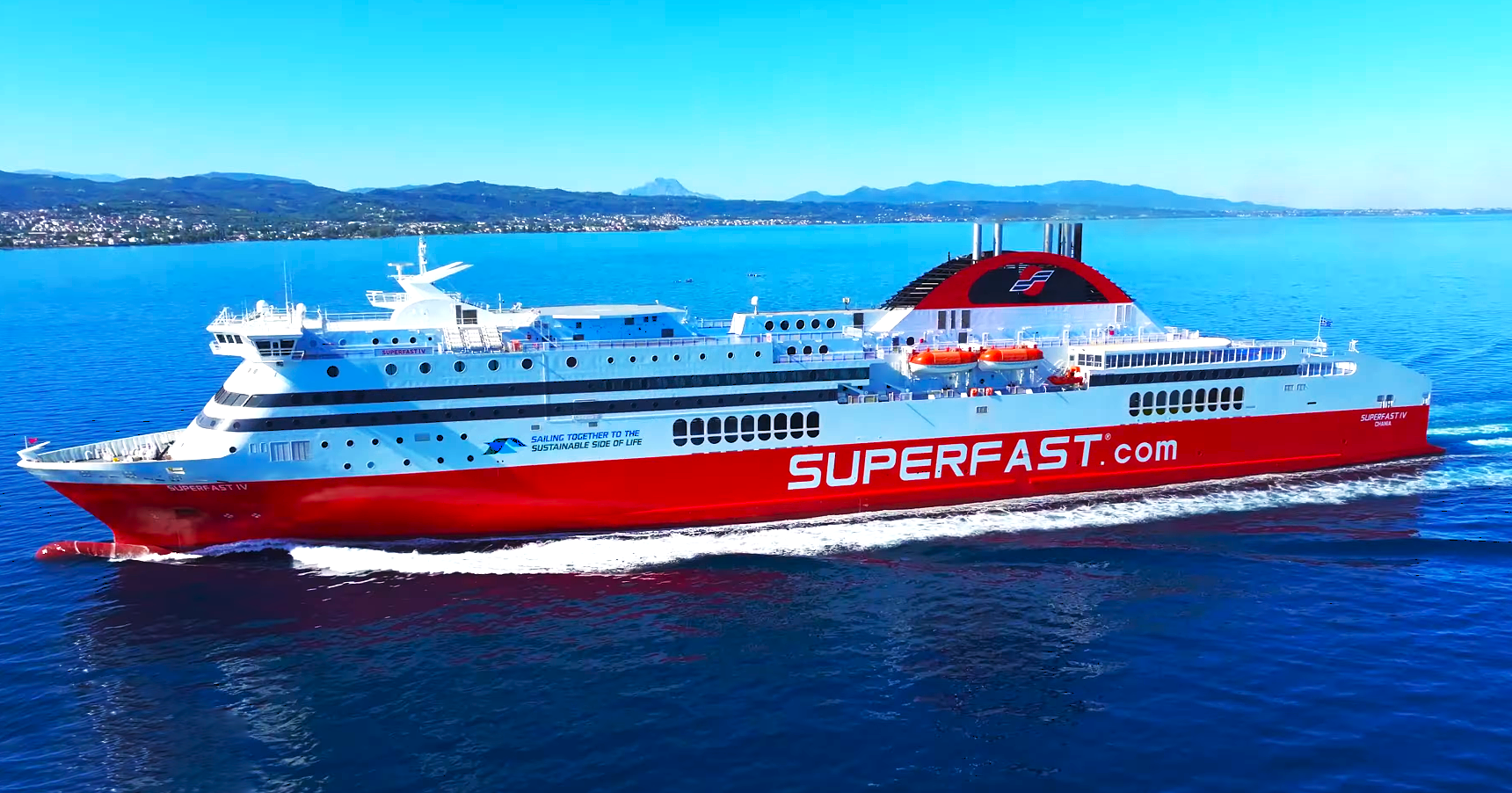
- Superfast IV entering Patras

History
- Name: Hellenic Spirit (2001-2025) Superfast IV (2025 – present)
- Owner: ANEK Lines (2001-2023) Attica Group (2023 – present)
- Operator: ANEK Lines (2001-2025) Superfast Ferries (2025 – present)
- Port of registry: Heraklion, Greece
- Route: Patra-Igoumenitsa-Ancona
- Builder: Fosen Mek Verksteder A/S, Norway
- Laid down: 2000
- Launched: 31 August 2000
- Completed: 2001
- In service: 2001–present
- Identification: IMO number: 9216030; Call sign: SYOA; MMSI number: 239806000
- Status: In service

General characteristics
- Type: Ro-pax ferry
- Tonnage: 32,694 GT; 6,524 DWT
- Length: 204 m (669 ft)
- Beam: 26 m (85 ft)
- Draft: 6.4 m (21 ft 0 in)
- Installed power: 4 × Wärtsilä-NSD 12V46C; combined 50,400 KW
- Propulsion: 2 propellers; 3 bow thrusters; 1 stern thruster
- Speed: Service 28.6 knots (52.97 km/h; 32.91 mph)
- Capacity: 1,850 passengers; 808 berths; 1,100 cars; 1,560 lane meters

Superfast IV is a Greek ferry operated and owned by Superfast Ferries. The ship was completed in 2001 at Fosen Mek Verksteder A/S, Norway. It travels from Ancona, Italy, to Patras, Greece, with a stop in Igoumenitsa, Greece.

== Service ==
The ship was launched as Kriti IV in Sweden, and was then towed to Fosen Shipyard in Norway for completion. Before putting her into service, the company chose to rename her Olympic Spirit , due to the excitement in Greece over Athens being designated as the host city for the 2004 Olympic Games ; however, the International Olympic Committee , which holds the rights to the Olympic Spirit brand , prevented Anek Lines from using it, and the ship was therefore renamed Hellenic Spirit .

Entered into service in May 2001 on the Ancona - Igoumenitsa - Patras line together with her twin ship Olympic Champion , she remained there continuously also in the following years.

In January 2025, with the acquisition of Anek Lines by Attica Group, it passed to Superfast Ferries and was renamed Superfast IV.

On 1 June 2025, after a few months in the shipyard in Perama , it will set sail for Patras , from where it will start service on the connections between the Greek port , Igoumenitsa and Ancona , joining the already existing sister ship Superfast III .

== Accidents and Incidents ==
On 26 April 2012, while operating under its former name Hellenic Spirit, the vessel was involved in a minor port accident at Patras, Greece. The 185-meter ro-ro cargo vessel Eurocargo Trieste was performing a mooring maneuver when it struck the port side of the berthed ferry. No injuries were reported among the passengers or crew on either ship, and the impact caused no environmental pollution or significant structural damage. Following safety inspections by local port authorities and classification society surveyors, both vessels were cleared and allowed to depart the following day.

== Sister ships ==
- Superfast III (former Olympic Champion)
