= Anafiotika =

Anafiotika Αναφιώτικα
- Neighborhood
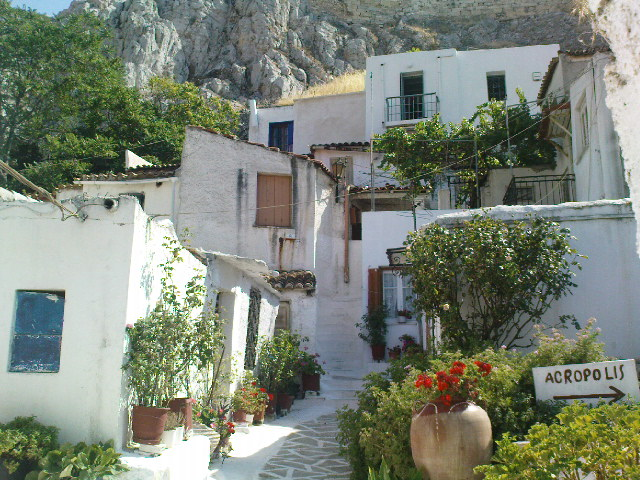
- Anafiotika

- Location within municipality of Athens
- Coordinates: 37°58′20″N 23°43′40″E
- Country: Greece
- Region: Attica
- City: Athens
- Postal code: 105 58
- Area code: 210
- Website: www.cityofathens.gr

Anafiotika (Greek: Αναφιώτικα [anaˈfçotika]) is a scenic tiny neighborhood of the center of Athens, part of the old historical neighborhood called Plaka. It lies on the northeast side of the Acropolis hill.

== History ==
The first houses were built in the era of Otto of Greece, when workers from the island of Anafi came to Athens in order to work as construction workers in the refurbishment of King Otto's Palace. The first two inhabitants were listed as G. Damigos, carpenter, and M. Sigalas, construction worker. Soon, workers from other Cycladic islands also started to arrive there, to work as carpenters or even stone and marble workers, in a further building reconstruction period in Athens, but also in the following era after the end of the reign of King Otto.

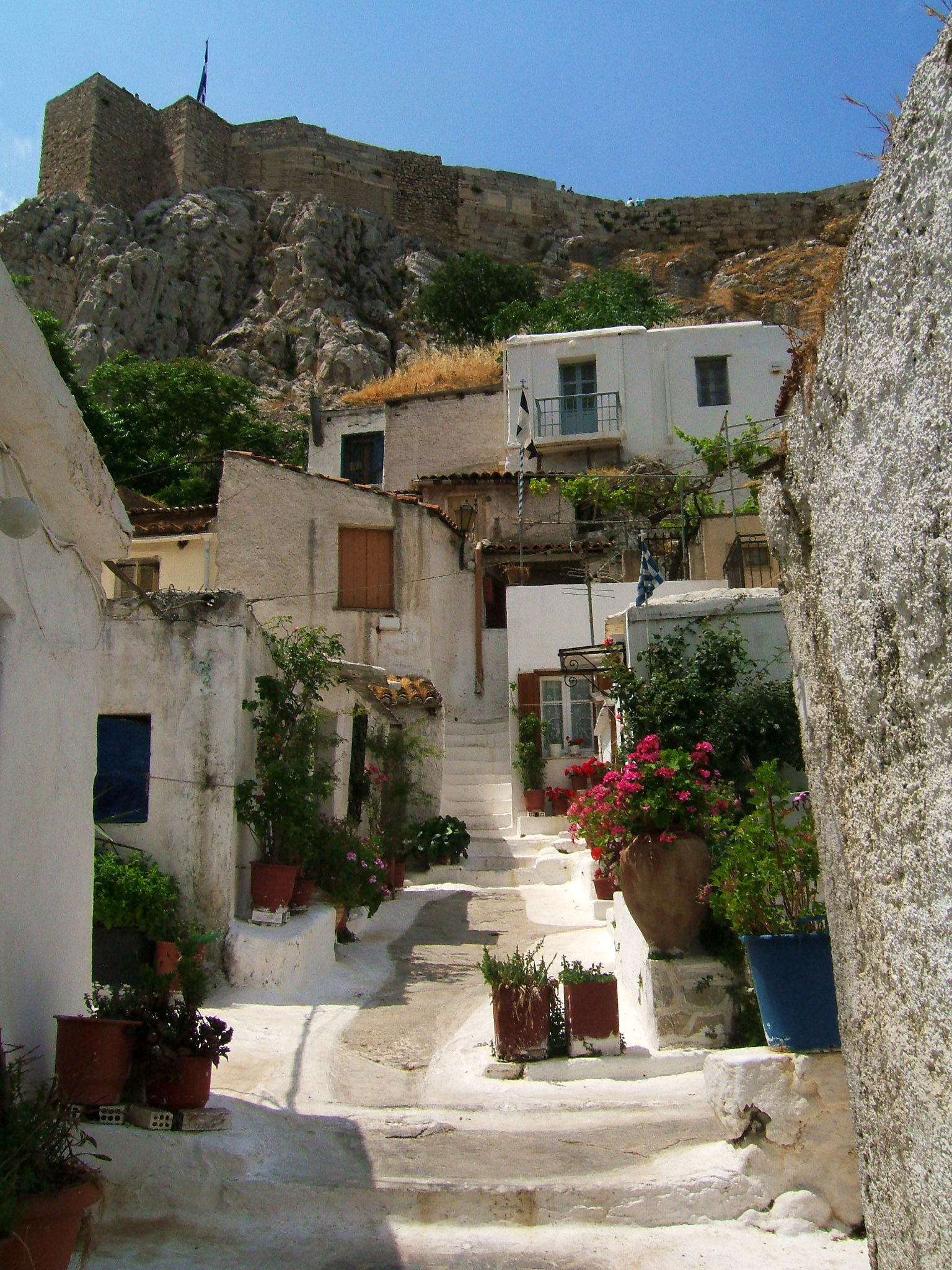
Acropolis view from Plaka, showing the Anafiotika neighborhood

In 1922, Greek refugees from Asia Minor also established here, altering the population that was up to that time only from the Cycladic islands. In 1950, part of this neighborhood was destroyed for archeological research and in 1970 the state started to buy the houses. In the modern era, there are only 45 houses remaining, while the little streets from Stratonos to the Acropolis rock are still unnamed and the houses are referred to as "Anafiotika 1", "Anafiotika 2", etc.

The neighborhood was built according to typical Cycladic architecture, and even nowadays gives to visitors the feel of Greek islands in the heart of the city, with white walls and small spaces, usually with the presence of bougainvillea flowers. Houses are small and mostly cubic, small streets that often end up to ladders or even deadends at terraces, where one can sit and enjoy the night view of the city.
