= Aqua Blue =

Greek ferry

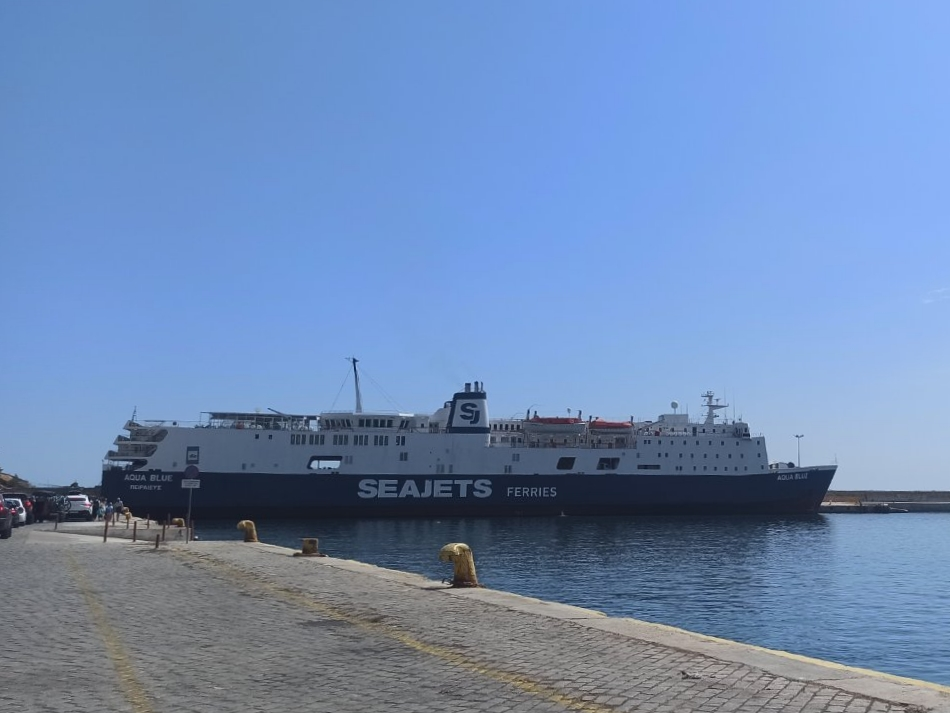
- Aqua Blue

History
- Name: 1975–1982: Green Arch; 1982–1990: Okudogo No 8; 1990–1995: Kydon; 1995–1999: Talos; 1999–2016: Ierapetra L; 2016: Iera; 2016–2017: Kiara; 2017: Aqua Azzurro; 2017–present: Aqua Blue
- Owner: 1975–1982: Hiroshima Green Ferry; 1982–1990: Kurushima Dock K.K. / Diamond Ferry; 1990–1999: ANEK Lines; 1999–2016: LANE Lines / LANE Sea Lines; 2016–2017: Iera Maritime / Kiara Maritime; 2017–present: Seajets (Sea Jets Ferries)
- Operator: 1975–1982: Hiroshima Green Ferry; 1982–1990: Diamond Ferry; 1990–1999: ANEK Lines; 1999–2016: LANE Sea Lines; 2017–present: Seajets
- Port of registry: 1975–1991: Hiroshima, Japan; 1991–1999: Chania, Greece; 1999–2016: Agios Nikolaos, Greece; 2016–2017: Malakal Harbour, Palau; 2017–present: Piraeus, Greece
- Route: Lavrio – Agios Efstratios – Limnos – Kavala; Former: Osaka – Hiroshima; Former: Patras – Igoumenitsa – Ancona / Trieste; Former: Piraeus – Dodecanese / Crete lifeline; Former: Thessaloniki – Sporades – Cyclades – Heraklion
- Ordered: 1974
- Builder: Kanda Shipbuilding Co., Ltd.; Kure, Japan
- Yard number: 197
- Laid down: 21 September 1974
- Launched: 19 February 1975
- Completed: 31 May 1975
- Acquired: 2017 (by Seajets)
- Maiden voyage: 11 June 1975
- In service: 1975
- Identification: IMO number: 7429669; Call sign: SVAI5; MMSI number: 241620000
- Status: in service

General characteristics
- Class & type: Custom Kanda Shipbuilding Ro-Pax Ferry
- Tonnage: 12,891 GT (originally 5,800 GT); 2,250 DWT
- Length: 137.01 m (449 ft 6 in)
- Beam: 22.00 m (72 ft 2 in)
- Draught: 5.58 m (18 ft 4 in)
- Depth: 8.00 m (26 ft 3 in)
- Decks: 8
- Ramps: Aft vehicle loading ramp and passenger gangways
- Installed power: 2 × Pielstick-Ishikawajima 16PC2-5V40 main diesel engines (total 15,668 kW / 21,303 hp)
- Propulsion: 2 × controllable pitch propellers
- Speed: 19.0 knots (35.2 km/h; 21.9 mph) (service) / 21.5 knots (39.8 km/h; 24.7 mph) (max)
- Capacity: 1,300 passengers (115 cabins / 375 berths); 400 cars or 820 lane metres for freight
- Crew: 23–50

Aqua Blue is a conventional passenger-roaming ship of the Seajets company. It is considered one of the most recognizable ships of the Greek coastal shipping fleet, as it has been serving for almost three decades in Greek seas, after an extensive renovation.

== History ==
The ship was built in 1975 at the Kanda Zosencho Dockyards in Hiroshima, Japan, with the original name "Green Arch". In 1982, it was sold to Kurushima Dock KK as Okudogo No 8. In 1991, it came to Greece on behalf of ANEK under the name "Kydon". It initially operated on the Patras-Igoumenitsa-Corfu-Trieste route. In 1995, it was renamed "Talos", after a major reconstruction with the aim of converting it into a modern 5-star cruise-ferry for the Adriatic and mainly Venice routes, while remaining on the same routes. In 1999, it was transferred to LANE and renamed Ierapetra L. Based in Piraeus, it served the Agios Nikolaos-Sitia-Kasos-Karpathos-Rhodes routes. In 2005, there was an accident and the ship ran aground in Rhodes, but the passengers and their vehicles were safely transported on the ship Vitsentzos Kornaros of the same company. Since 2007, while it remained in LANE, it served the Piraeus-Chania/Rethymno line. In 2009, it returned to ANEK signals under the same name, serving lines in the Aegean, Ikaria, Samos and barren routes, thanks to its significant capacity. In 2016, ANEK intended to send it for scrapping, but in 2017 it joined the Seajets fleet and was renamed “Kiara”. After extensive renovation and reconstruction work, in 2018 it was named “Aqua Blue”.

== Itineraries ==
In the summer of 2018, it began operating on the route: Thessaloniki – Skiathos – Andros – Syros – Tinos – Mykonos – Naxos – Santorini – Heraklion. In the summer of 2019, it served the route: Rafina – Andros – Tinos – Mykonos, with an extension twice a week to Ikaria and Samos.

== Interior spaces ==
The interior and exterior spaces of the ship are fully renovated and distributed over three decks:

- Deck 6: Reception, "Poseidon" and "Aphrodite" flight lounges, cabins.
- Deck 7: Large "Main" lounge with bar, self-service (180 people) and "Club" room, as well as cabins.
- Deck 8: Discotheque with bar, "Aqua" lounge, open deck, cabins.

It has a total of 115 cabins (370 beds), 2 cabins for disabled people and 9 bow lux cabins of high comfort.

== Bridge and engine room ==
The bridge maintains the classic Japanese semicircular design with a soft pistachio color. Features include the double metal steering wheel and the telegraph, elements of the Japanese shipbuilding school of the 1970s. The engine room houses the two main engines and the three electric engines, in excellent condition and cleanliness.

== Accidents and Incidents ==
=== 2012 collision (Ikaria) ===
On 1 March 2012, during the evening hours, vessel Ierapetra L. struck the dock at the port of Agios Kirykos during mooring maneuvers due to adverse weather conditions. The ferry was operating a scheduled itinerary from Vathy to Karlovasi, Fournoi, Agios Kirykos, Evdilos, Syros, and Piraeus, carrying 312 passengers who all disembarked safely. The impact caused a deformation of the hull plating below the stern ramp structure and created a 20-centimeter diameter hole directly underneath the buckle. No marine pollution was observed.

Due to the worsening weather and strong winds, the Master informed the Agios Kirykos Port Authority that remaining at the berth was unsafe. The ship subsequently departed for the port of Evdilos with 336 passengers on board, docking there safely at 23:15, where local authorities initially issued a detention order.

Following the presentation of a class maintenance certificate by its classification society to the Evdilos Port Authority, the vessel was cleared and departed at 03:45 for Syros and Piraeus with 399 passengers. The ship arrived safely at the port of Syros at 07:35, where it underwent an inspection by the local Ship Inspection Team, and was permitted to resume its voyage to Piraeus at 08:10.

==== 2014 fire ====
On 29 November, Ierapetra L. caught fire in the Adriatic Sea shortly after departing from the port of Brindisi, Italy. The ship was bound for Bari with 23 crew members on board when a fire broke out within the engine room.

The crew initially attempted to douse the blaze manually but were unable to bring it under control, prompting them to request emergency assistance. Nearby vessels responded to the scene, and the fire was ultimately extinguished with the aid of the ship's onboard fixed fire suppression system.

Escorted by three maritime patrol boats, the Ierapetra L. turned back and safely returned to Brindisi. No injuries were reported among the crew. However, the ferry sustained significant structural damage inside the engine room, with scorching and heat damage visible on the exterior hull.

===== 2019 grounding (Andros) =====
On 1 August 2019, during the evening hours, Aqua Blue struck the pier with the starboard side of its stern above the waterline during docking maneuvers at the port of Gavrio. Following subsequent maneuvers by the Master, the ferry ran aground in a shallow sandy area within the Gavrio harbor basin.

The vessel was successfully refloated with the assistance of the fishing boat Ioannis S, which helped secure one of the ship's mooring lines to the pier, allowing Aqua Blue to free itself and safely dock at the port. The ship was operating a scheduled itinerary from Rafina to Andros, Tinos, and Mykonos, carrying 56 crew members, 86 passengers, 18 cars, 18 trucks, and 1 motorcycle. No injuries or marine pollution were reported.

The Andros Port Authority launched a preliminary investigation and detained the vessel until a professional underwater hull survey is conducted, approval is granted by the local Ship Inspection Team, and a class maintenance certificate is issued by its classification society. The shipowner arranged for the passengers to be rerouted to their destinations aboard with ferry Theologos P.
