= Irineos Galanakis =

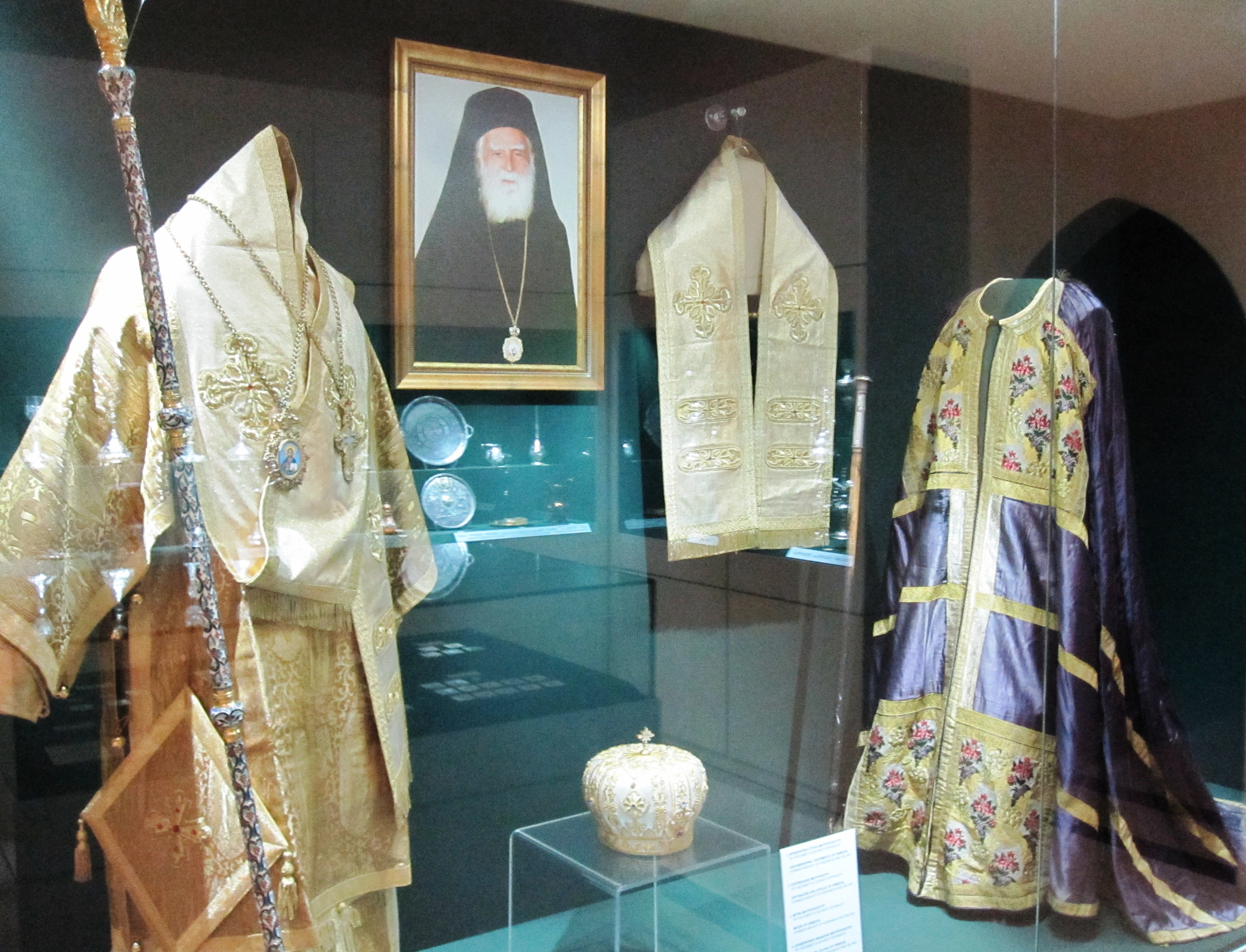
Agia Triada Museio.png

Metropolitan Irineos (born Michail Galanakis; November 10, 1911 – April 30, 2013) was bishop of Constantinople Orthodox Church, Metropolitan of Germany.
