= Anafi =

Greek island in the Aegean Sea

Anafi Ανάφη
- Municipality
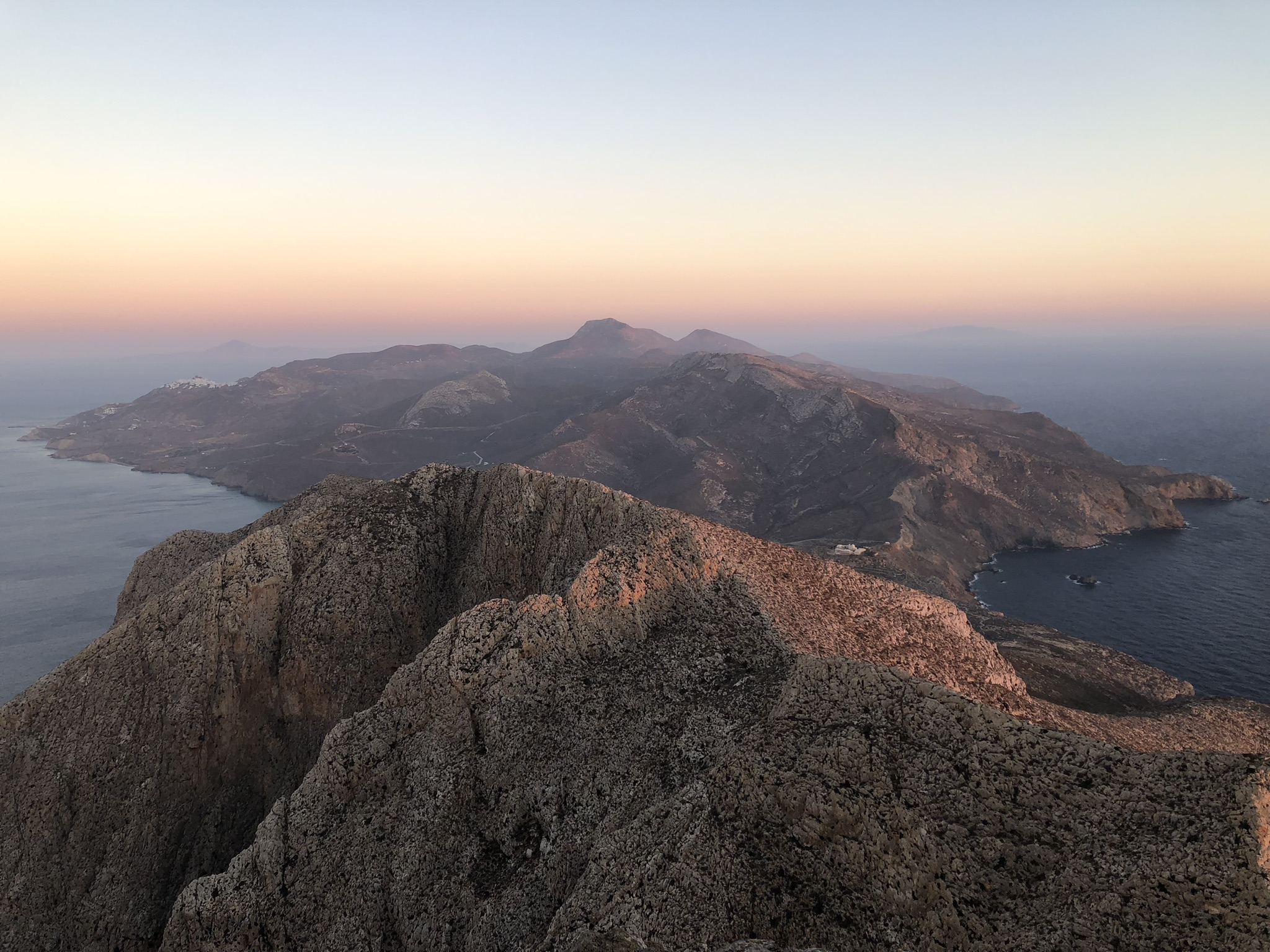
- View of Anafi from Mt. Kalamos

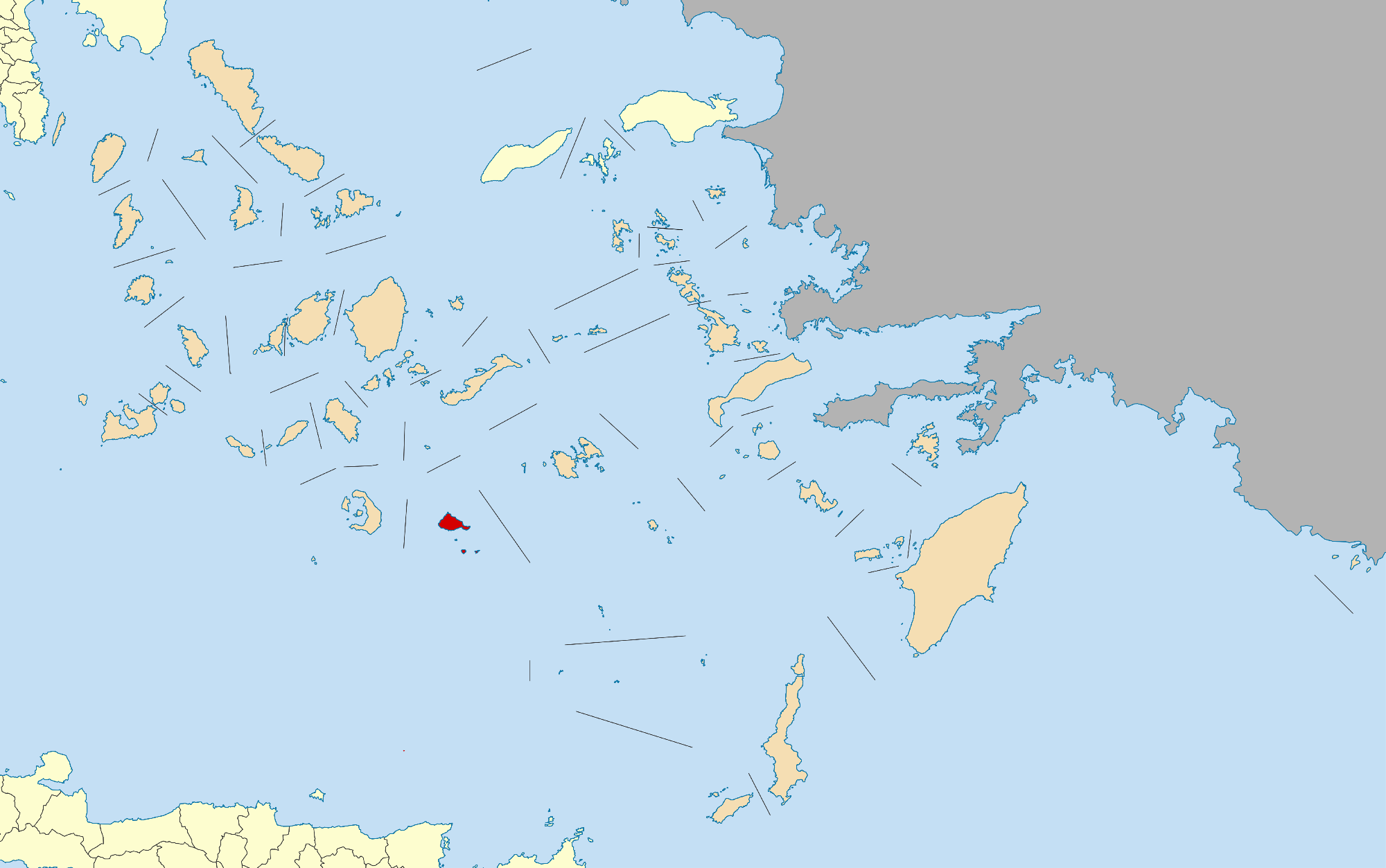

- Location within Greece
- Coordinates: 36°22′19″N 25°47′43″E
- Country: Greece
- Administrative region: South Aegean
- Regional unit: Thira

Area
  - Municipality: 40.370 km^{2} (15.587 sq mi)
- Highest elevation: 584 m (1,916 ft)
- Lowest elevation: 0 m (0 ft)

Population (2021)
  - Municipality: 293
  - Density: 7.26/km^{2} (18.8/sq mi)
- Time zone: UTC+2 (EET)
  - Summer (DST): UTC+3 (EEST)
- Postal code: 840 09
- Area code: 22860
- Vehicle registration: EM
- Website: www.anafi.gr

Anafi or Anaphe (Greek: Ανάφη; Ancient Greek: Ἀνάφη) is a Greek island community in the Cyclades. In 2021, it had a population of 293. Its land area is 40.370 square kilometres (15.587 square miles). It lies east of the island of Thíra (Santorini). Anafi is part of the Thira regional unit.

== History ==
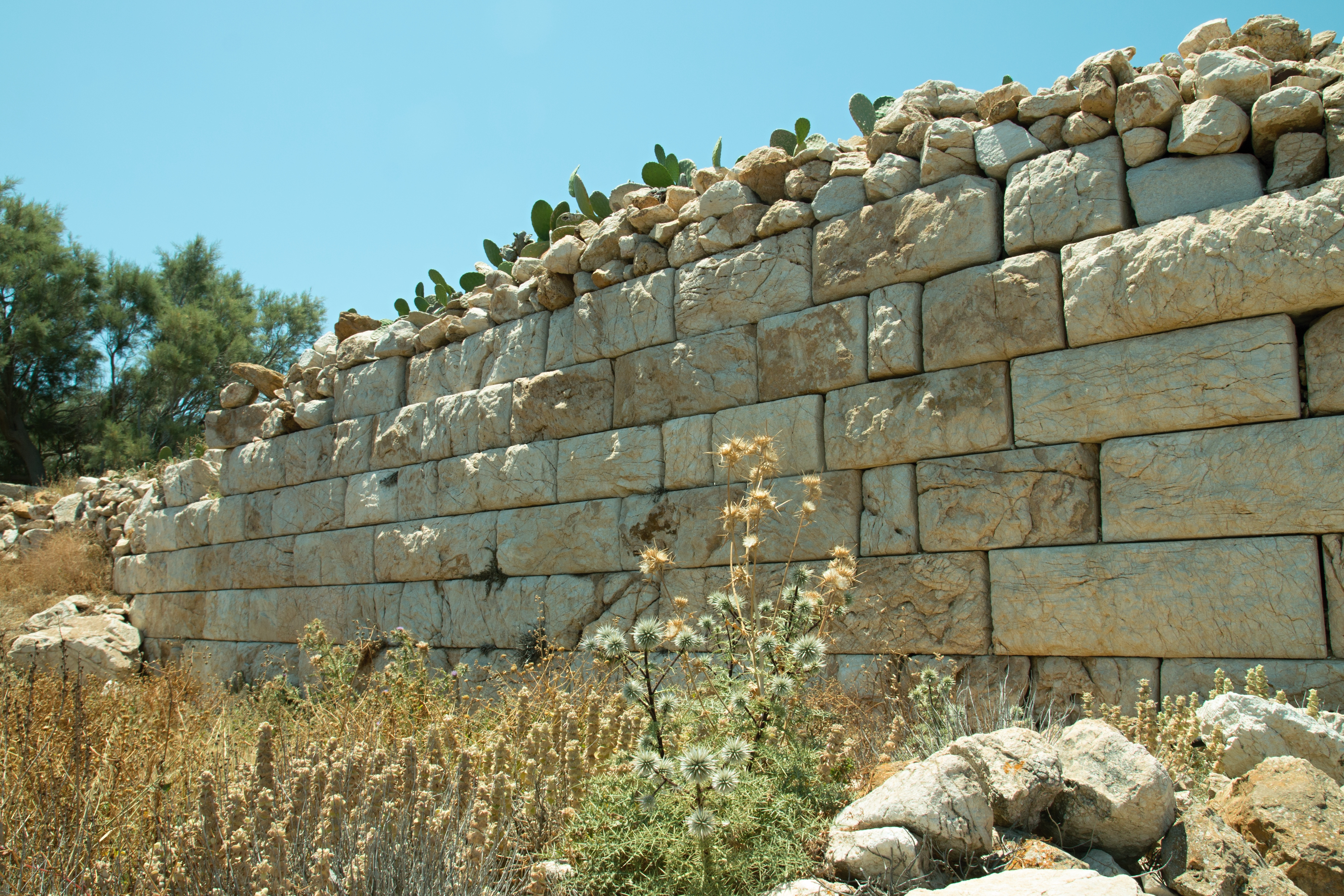
Remains of the temple of Apollo Aigletes, Zoodochos Pigi Monastery

According to mythology, the island was given the name Anafi because Apollo made it appear to the Argonauts as a shelter from a bad storm, using his bow to shed light upon it (i.e. the island name Ἀνάφη is derived from ἀνέφηνεν, lit. 'he made appear'). If the name of the island derives from this word, and means 'revelation', then Anafi is linked to Delos, an island whose name also derives from an ancient Greek word meaning 'to reveal'. Others say that the name is due to the non-existence of snakes on the island: "an Ophis" ("without snakes"). Despite its small size, Anafi offers archaeological as well as mythological interest. At the monastery of Panagia Kalamiotissa there are ruins of a temple built as an offering to the god Apollo Aegletus (Greek: Απόλλων Αιγλήτης). Some of the inscriptions from the island (Inscriptiones Graecae XII, 248 line 8) refer to the god Apollo as asgelatos (ασγέλατος, a unique usage, said by some scholars to be a variant of Aigletes, 'radiant'). However, one scholar (Burkert 1992) links this epithet to a Sumerian goddess of healing and to Apollo's son Asclepius. Ruins can also be found at Kasteli, and most of the findings, such as the statues, are now located at the Archaeological Museum at the Chora, in an extremely small room. In Roman times the island was used as a place of exile.

After the Fourth Crusade in 1204, when the Cyclades were taken over by Venetians, Anafi was granted by the Duke of Naxos, Marco I Sanudo to Leonardo Foscolo. Under Latin rule, the island was known as Namfio. In the late 1270s, the island was recovered for the Byzantine Empire by Licario and another Italian renegade and native of Anafi, John de lo Cavo, who succeeded Licario as imperial admiral in the Aegean. In 1307, following a treaty between the Byzantines and the Republic of Venice, the island was recovered by the Dukes of Naxos, who assigned it as a fief to Januli Gozzadini, of Bolognese origin.

Much later the ruler of Anafi, William Crispo (1390-1463), became regent of the Duchy of Naxos, leaving Anafi under the control of his daughter Florence. William is said to have built the fortifications (kastro) above the present village. He is also claimed to have built a fortress, sometimes referred to as 'Gibitroli', on Mount Kalamos.

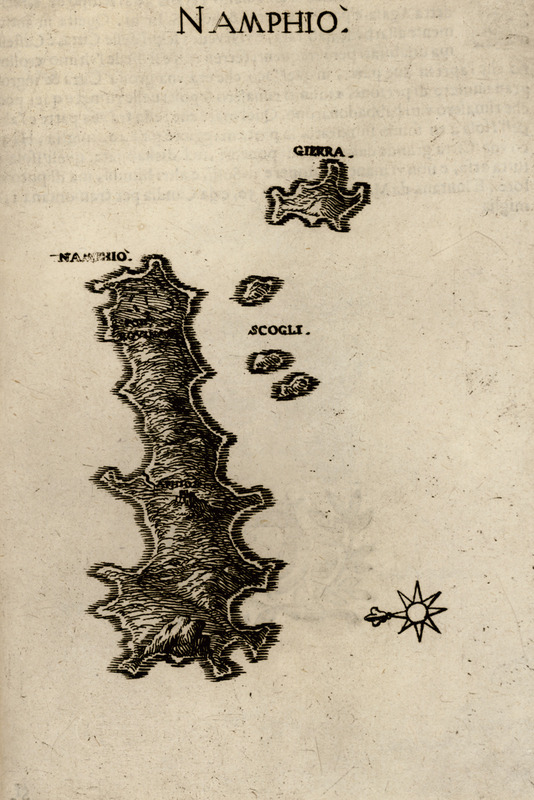
Anafi (Namphio) by Marco Boschini, 1658

In 1481, the island passed to the Pisani family as part of a dowry. The Pisani ruled it until 1537, when the Ottoman admiral Hayreddin Barbarossa raided it and carried off all its inhabitants as slaves. The island was eventually resettled, and acquired a set of privileges from the Ottoman court in 1700 in exchange for 500 crowns. Thereafter it was left largely to fend for itself, except for the annual visit of the Ottoman fleet to collect tribute. The island was visited in 1700 by Joseph Pitton de Tournefort, botanist to the French court. He describes Mount Kalamos as "une des plus effroyables roches qui soit au monde" ("one of the most terrible rocks in the world"). Some of the ancient remains from the island were acquired by French and British antiquaries; one Hellenistic statue from Kastelli (of a woman holding an incense cup) can be found in the Hermitage Museum, Saint Petersburg.

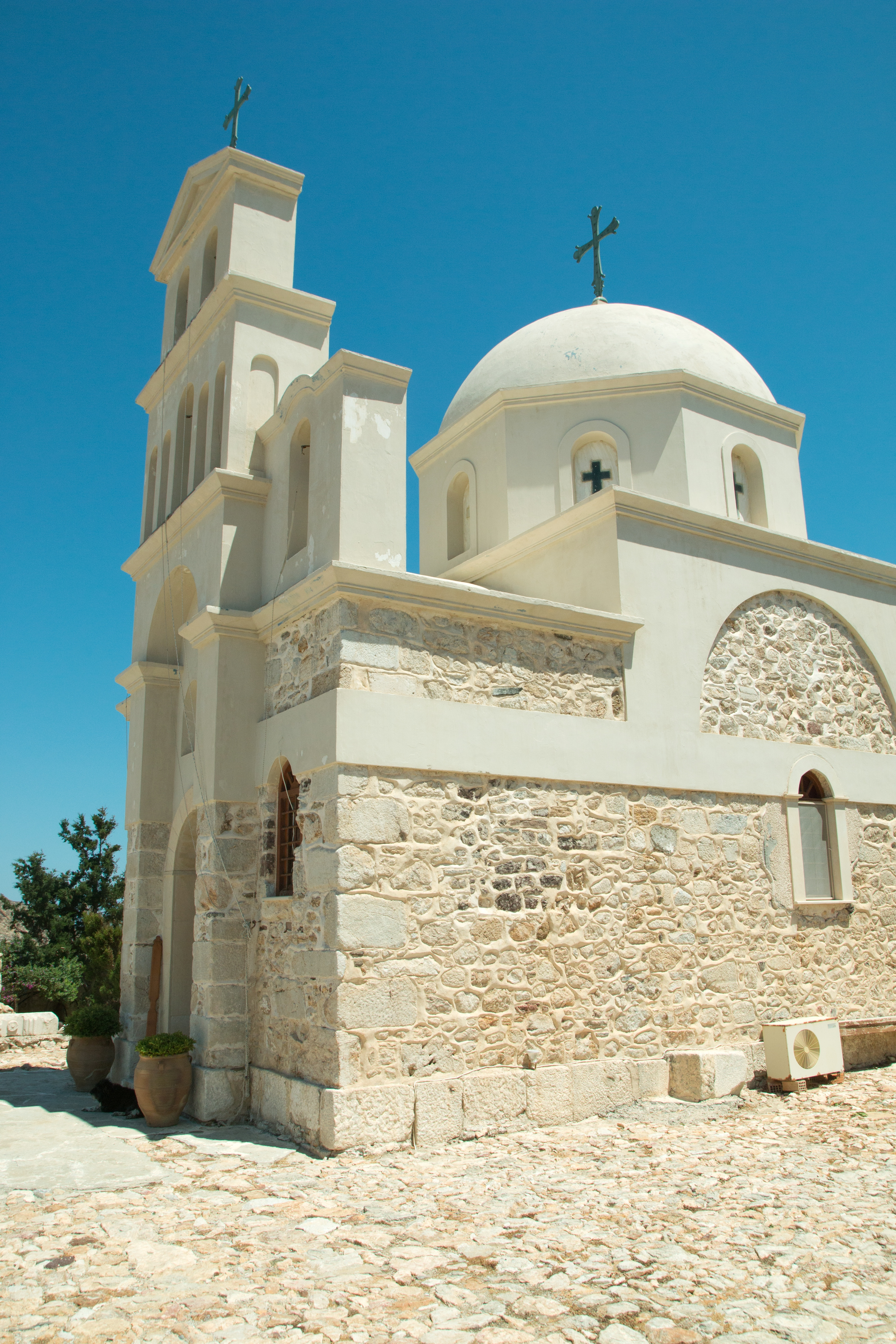
Church of Zoodochos Pigi

During the Russo-Turkish War of 1768–1774, it was held and used as a base by the Russian fleet under Alexei Orlov from 1770 until the war's end. During the Greek War of Independence, the Anafiots sent "two Caïques of men" to join the struggle. Many men left the island to help in the building of Athens as capital city of Greece, and from then on there was both seasonal and permanent migration, and a migrant community grew up in the city. They built houses for themselves on the slopes of the Acropolis rock, in an area still known as Anafiotika (see Caftanzoglou 2000). James Theodore Bent visited the island with his wife in the winter of 1880-81 and gives a vivid description of the island.

The island was used as a place of internal exile for criminals and political dissidents from the 1920s onward.

Tourism developed after the fall of the military junta in 1974 and the installation of an electricity generator and undertaking of harbor works the same year. The building of paved roads that begun in the late 1980s not only increased tourism but revived the island's agricultural economy. There are numerous publications relating to the island from the mid-1960s (see books and articles by Margaret Kenna) and her photographs of the island and migrant communities over the decades since 1966 have been gifted to the Benaki Museum Photographic Archive (located in Kolonaki Square - Filikis Etaireias 15).

== Geography ==
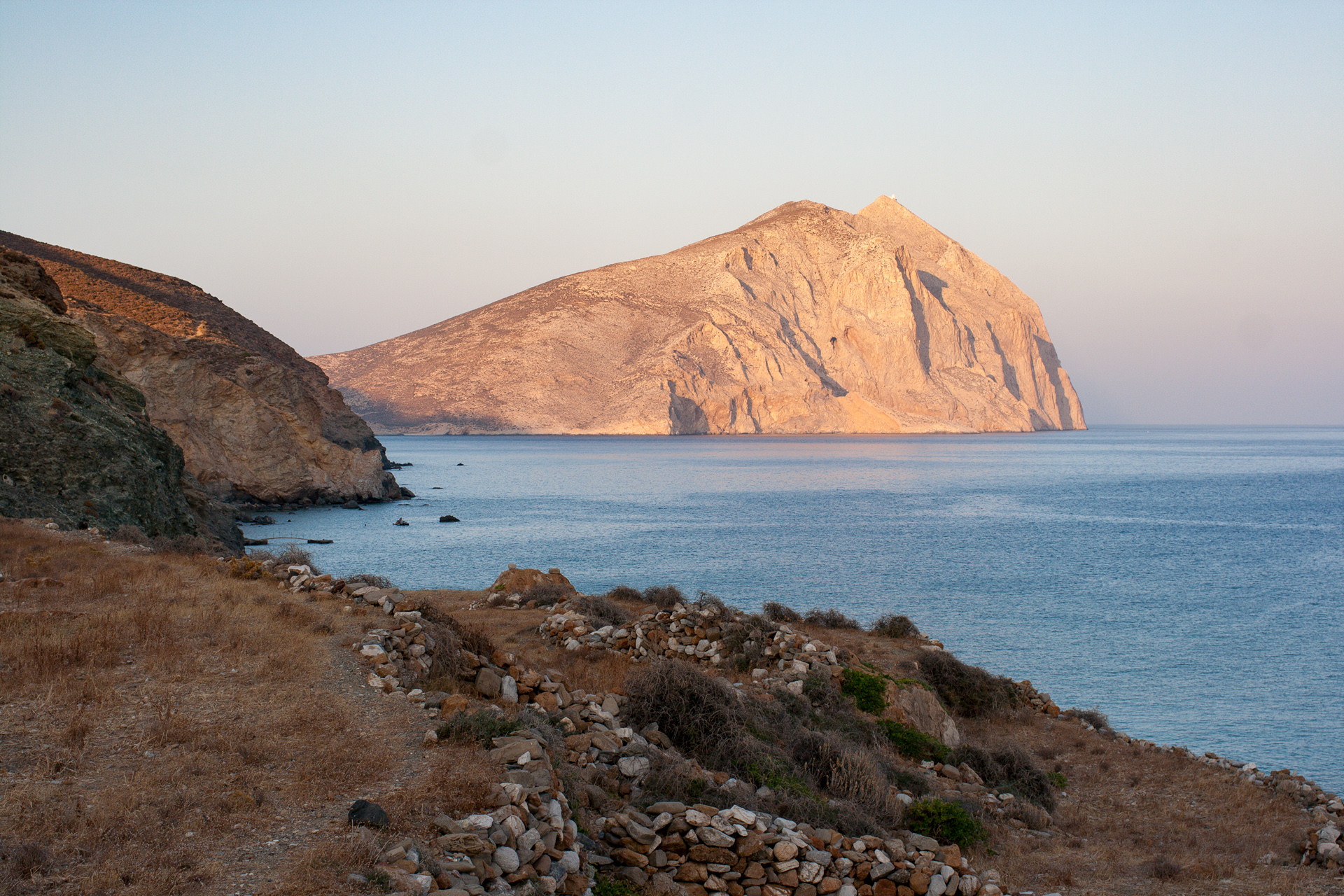
Mt Kalamos

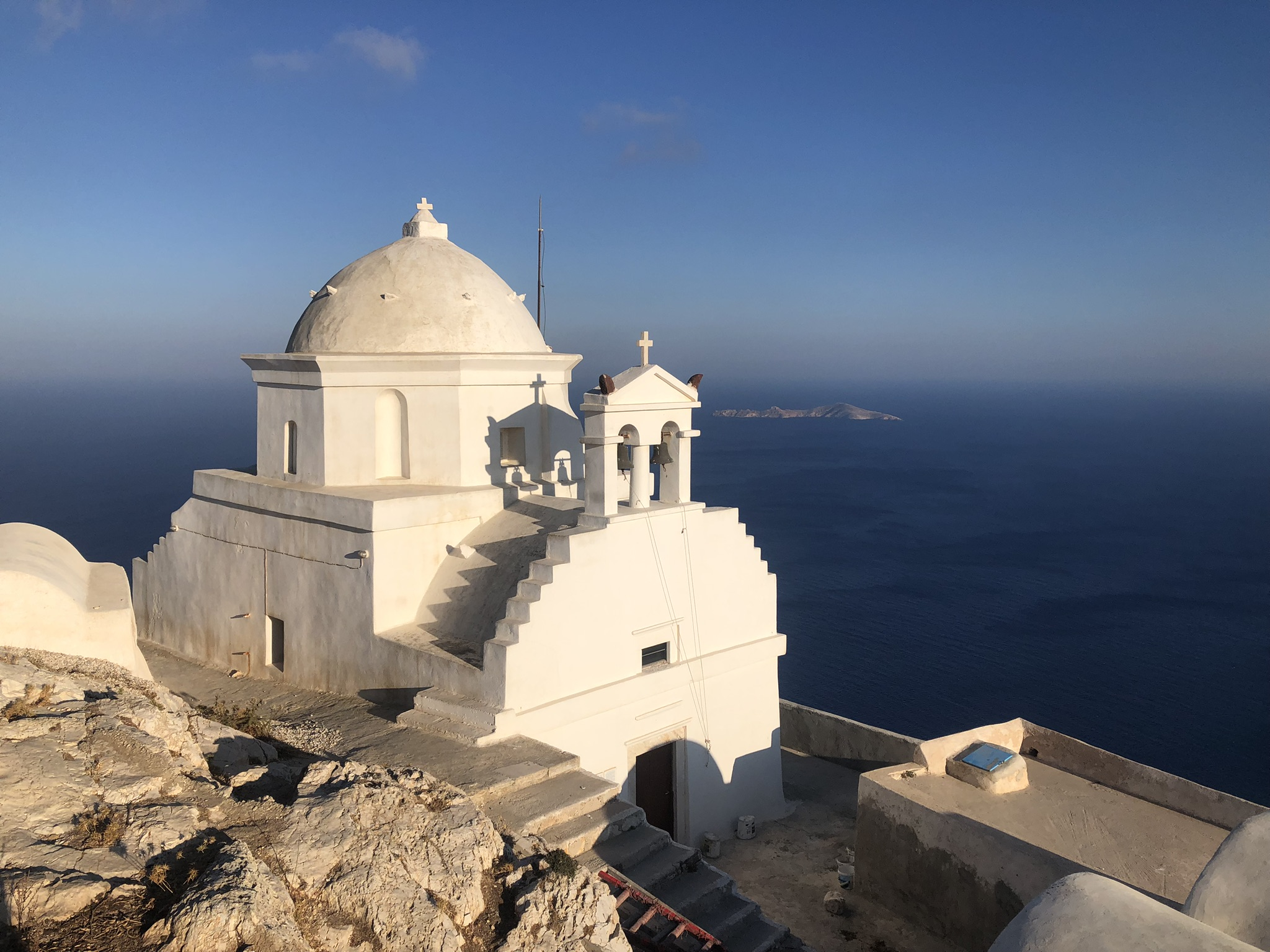
Church of Theotokos Kalamiotissa

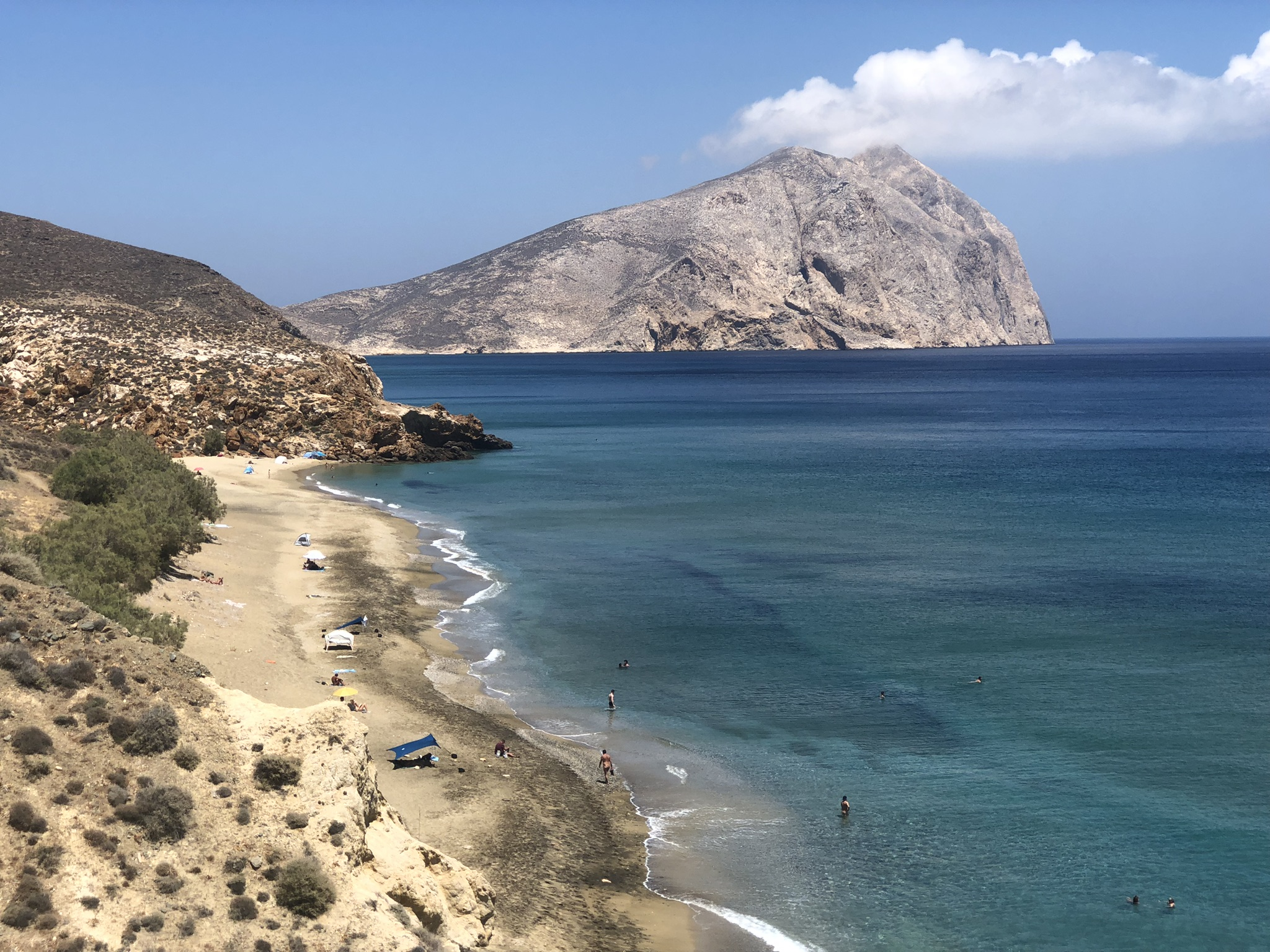
Roukounas beach

Along with its larger neighbour Santorini, Anafi was not originally counted among the Cyclades by ancient geographers but among the Sporades. This only changed during the period of Latin rule in the late Middle Ages.

Anafi is very much an island for walking. Antonis Kaloyerou has published a walkers' guide to the island, in Greek, profusely illustrated, with detailed instructions, timings, and distances (Αντωνης Καλογηρου, Τα Μονοπατια της Αναφης, ROAD 2010, see www.road.gr). There is also a 1:15.000 "hiking map" in Greek and English published by Terrain, no: 318. (See www.terrainmaps.gr) Through the old paths and around the steep hills, you can walk to the other side of the island. The most popular beaches are Klisidi and Roukounas. A peninsula at the eastern end of the island is dominated by a monolithic peak, Mt. Kalamos, among the largest in the Mediterranean at 420 m (1,378 ft). Perched atop this massif is the Kalamiotissa church, rebuilt in large part after an earthquake in the 1950s. The icon from this church (called locally "the Upper Monastery") was taken, after a storm in 1887, to the church at the foot of Mount Kalamos, built inside the walls of Apollo's temple (called locally "the Lower Monastery"). The festival associated with this icon is celebrated on 8 September, the Birth of the Virgin. On the island, the epithet (unique in Greece) applied to the Virgin is Kalamiotissa, as the icon is said to have been found on a reed (kalami) on the peak of Mount Kalamos. The journey to and from Anafi can only be done by boat, and since they have added more destinations on the way, it takes almost 19 hours from Athens. However, the boat schedule changes in the summer, and in the winter, so it is important to check carefully before travelling. It is also possible to reach the island from Santorini.

A geological survey of the island published in 1870 mentions deposits of calamine (used in galvanising), and there are deposits of clay in the area of Vayia used by the island's potter in the 1950s. More recently geologists took advantage of the extensive excavations associated with road-building in the 1980s and 1990s to examine the rock strata and other geological features affected by the volcanic eruptions of Santorini and the deposits of volcanic ash which fell on Anafi. A hydrographic chart of the island ("Anaphi, Pasha and Makrea") from 1859, under the direction of Captain Thomas Spratt (1811-1888) of HMS Medina, can be found in the archives of the UK Hydrographic Office, accessioned 4 June 1860 and ref D4737.

== Transport ==
As of 2021, there are indications of an airfield being constructed at the western end of the island. The port is served by a Pireas to Rhodes ferry, which also stops at Heraklion (Crete) and Athinios (Santorini) among other places.

== Climate ==
Anafi has a hot-summer Mediterranean climate with mild winters and pleasant summers. There is a long dry season lasting from May to the end of September.

Climate data for Anafi (235m)
Month	Jan	Feb	Mar	Apr	May	Jun	Jul	Aug	Sep	Oct	Nov	Dec	Year
Mean daily maximum °C (°F)	13.3 (55.9)	13.9 (57.0)	14.9 (58.8)	17.5 (63.5)	23.1 (73.6)	26.5 (79.7)	29 (84)	29.4 (84.9)	25.9 (78.6)	22.9 (73.2)	18.8 (65.8)	15.6 (60.1)	20.9 (69.6)
Mean daily minimum °C (°F)	9.9 (49.8)	10.3 (50.5)	11 (52)	12.9 (55.2)	17.4 (63.3)	20.3 (68.5)	22.8 (73.0)	23.5 (74.3)	20.9 (69.6)	18.3 (64.9)	15.4 (59.7)	12 (54)	16.2 (61.2)
Average precipitation mm (inches)	68.8 (2.71)	91.6 (3.61)	65.7 (2.59)	15.9 (0.63)	1.7 (0.07)	0.1 (0.00)	0.1 (0.00)	0.1 (0.00)	0.2 (0.01)	15.4 (0.61)	44.2 (1.74)	74.8 (2.94)	378.6 (14.91)
Source: http://penteli.meteo.gr/stations/anafi/ (2019-2021 averages)

== Flora and fauna ==
Anafi has a relatively diverse flora for its small size, represented by 314 plant genera and a total of 635 species and subspecies, 37 of which are endemic to Greece. It is also one of the islands where Eleonora's Falcon can be seen, a falcon ("hobby") which preys on migrating birds and breeds in the late summer/ autumn. An area along the south coast of the island (Roukounas and Kalamos) is protected under the EU Natura 2000 conservation scheme.

== Arts and Crafts ==
Embroideries from Anafi can be found in the Benaki Museum, and in the Museum of Folk Crafts, Athens. There are also examples in the Fitzwilliam Museum, Cambridge (UK), and in the Victoria and Albert Museum, London (UK). Many of these were collected and later donated by AJB Wace.

== Contemporary Art ==
The island hosts a biennial art event named Phenomenon, which started in 2015.

== Sources ==
- Freely, John (2006). The Cyclades: Discovering the Greek Islands of the Aegean. I.B.Tauris. ISBN 1845111605.
- Miller, William (1908). The Latins in the Levant, a History of Frankish Greece (1204–1566). New York: E.P. Dutton and Company.
