= MS Stena Germanica =

MS Stena Germanica may refer to:

- Stena Germanica (built 1967) – Renamed MV A Regina, ran aground and wrecked near Isla de Mona, Puerto Rico in 1985, and whose wreck was eventually scrapped in situ in 1990
- Stena Germanica (built 1987) – Now MS Stena Vision with Stena Line
- MS Stena Germanica (2001) (built 2001) – Current Stena Germanica
