= Athinios (Santorini) =

Primary ferry port of Santorini

Coordinates: 36°23′09.6″N 25°25′46.2″E

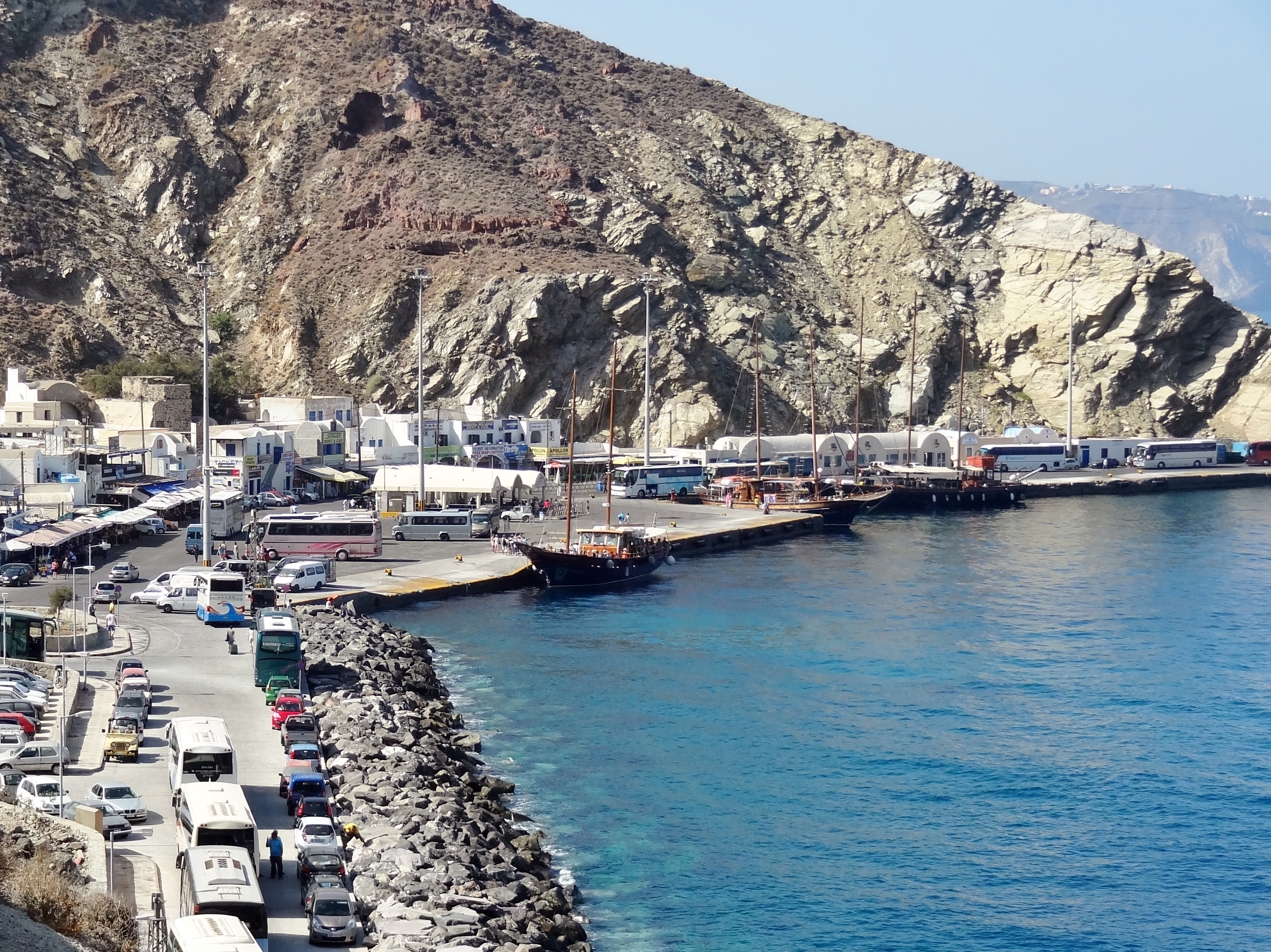
View of Athinios port.

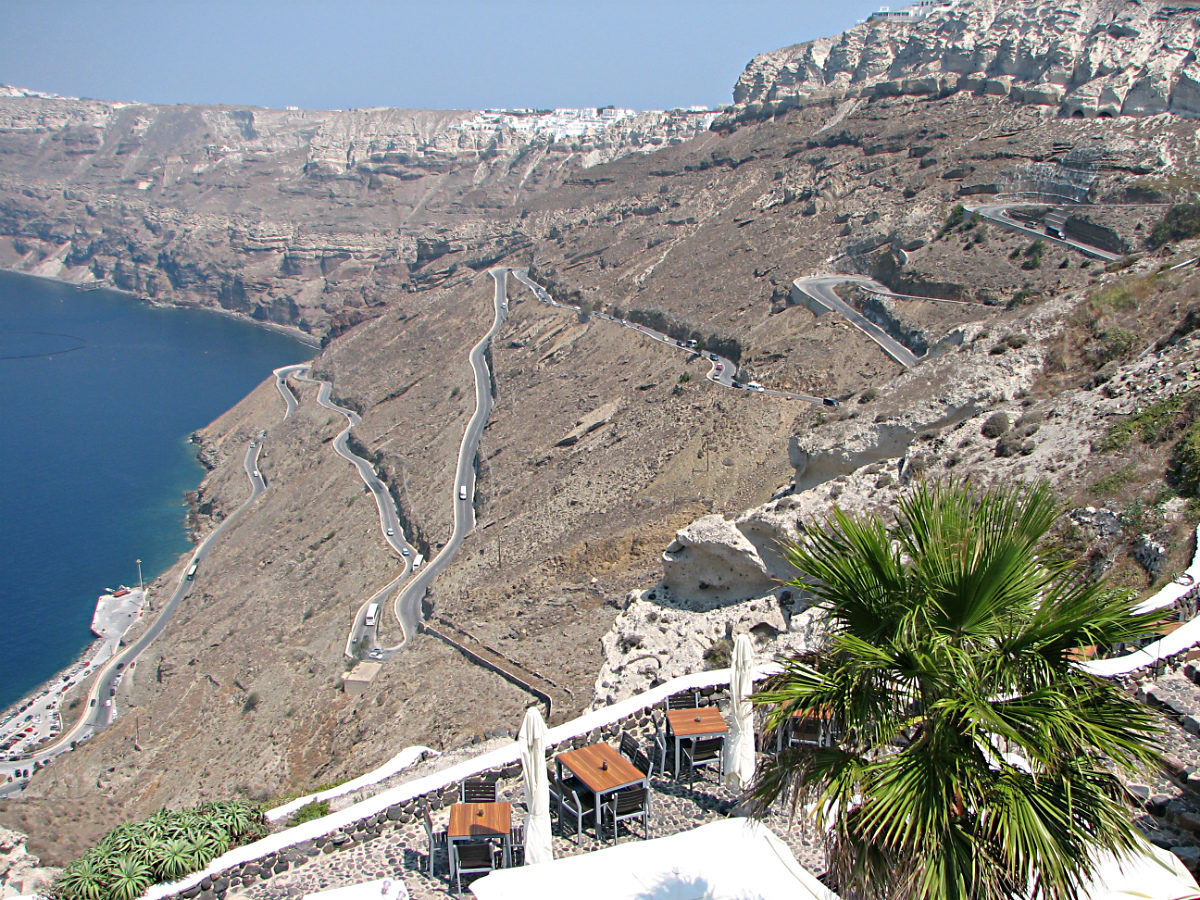
The road to Athinios port.

Athinios port or simply Athinios (Greek: Αθηνιός) is the primary ferry port of Santorini, located approximately 10 km south of the capital Fira. It is the only port on Santorini with regular passenger ferry services linking the island to Athenian port of Piraeus, Cyclades, Crete, and Rhodes. Athinios is surrounded by steep, multi-colored volcanic cliffs, along which a road winds to the top, zigzagging backwards and forward.

== See also ==
- MS Sea Diamond
