= El. Venizelos (ship) =

Greek ferry

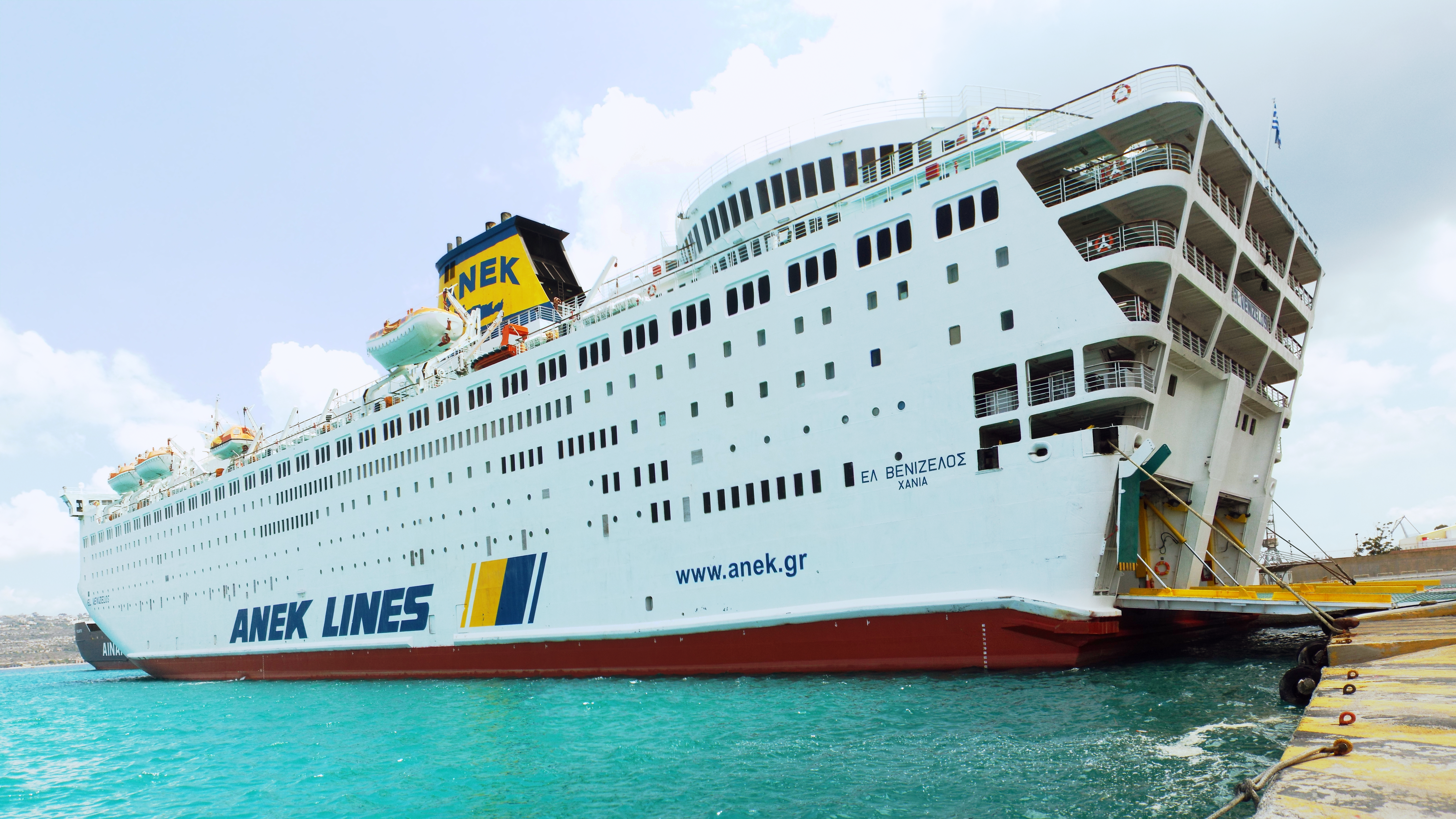
- El. Venizelos in the port of Souda, Greece in 2018

History
- Name: (1984–1988): Stena Polonica; (1988–1990): Bonanza; (1990–1992): Kydon II; (1992–present): El. Venizelos
- Owner: (1979–1988): Stena Line; (1988–1989): Fred. Olsen Lines; (1989–present): ANEK Lines / Attica Group
- Operator: (1992–present): ANEK Lines; (2004–2011 summer charters): COTUNAV; (2013 charter): SNCM; (2016 charter): Africa Morocco Link
- Port of registry: (1992–present): Chania, Greece
- Route: Piraeus – Chania; Former: Trieste – Patras; Former: Tunis – Genoa / Marseille (charter); Former: Tanger Med – Algeciras (charter)
- Ordered: 1979
- Builder: Stocznia im. Komuny Paryskiej (Gdynia, Poland; hull); Perama, Greece (completion)
- Yard number: B494 / 3
- Laid down: 5 November 1983
- Launched: 28 October 1984
- Completed: June 1992
- Acquired: 1989 (by ANEK Lines)
- Maiden voyage: June 1992
- In service: 1992
- Identification: IMO number: 7907673; Call sign: SWWZ; MMSI number: 237628000
- Status: In service

General characteristics
- Class & type: Stena B494 Class / ANEK Cruise Ferry
- Tonnage: 38,261 GT; 5,351 DWT
- Length: 175.48 m (575 ft 9 in)
- Beam: 28.50 m (93 ft 6 in)
- Draught: 6.70 m (22 ft 0 in)
- Decks: 12
- Ramps: Two vehicle loading ramps, one passenger ramp
- Installed power: 4 × Zgoda-Sulzer 16ZV 40/48 diesel engines (total 34,130 kW / 45,770 hp)
- Propulsion: 2 × controllable pitch propellers
- Speed: 22.0 knots (40.7 km/h; 25.3 mph) (service)
- Capacity: 2,200 passengers (1,606 beds in 4 luxury classes/cabins); 850 cars / 1,650 lane metres for freight
- Crew: 140

MS El. Venizelos is a Greek ferry, and second oldest ship in the ANEK Lines fleet. It is a motor Ro-Ro/Passenger ferryboat, built in 1984 at Stocznia im. Komuny Paryskiej, Gdynia, Poland as Stena Polonica and completed in 1992 in Perama, Piraeus, Greece as El Venizelos. It is one of 4 sister ships, Stena Vision and Stena Spirit, both owned by Stena Lines, and the unfinished Lelakis' Regent Sky. It can hold a total of 2300 passenger and 850 cars and has 1606 beds for passengers. It has four Zgoda-Sulzer 16ZV 40/48 diesel engines, with combined power of 34,130 kW and can reach a speed of 22 knots. It also has WiFi Internet, two restaurants. two bars (one cafe bar and one piano bar), an amusement arcade, a casino, a church, a duty-free shop, a playground, a hospital, escalators, elevators, air-conditioning and a swimming pool and its cabins can be either "lux", 2-bed, 4-bed, or for the disabled. It is named after Eleftherios Venizelos, a Greek politician who served as Prime Minister of Greece and has Cretan origins. On 30 March El Venizelos laid-up since three days in Piraeus Anchorage had cases with the COVID-19. On 2 April at nine pm El Venizelos moored at the Piraeus Port. From 25 April 2020 to 13 April 2023 she was laid up at Perama.

== History ==
=== 1979–1999 ===
The vessel was ordered by Stena Line AB in 1979. This ship was the third of four gigantic vessels for Stena Line made in Poland and was going to be named Stena Polonica. The construction was delayed but by 28 October 1984 she was launched. However, in 1986, Stena Line cancelled its delivery because none of the equipment for the interior was produced, as well as because of several long delays. One of her sister ships was also cancelled, so only the other two were completed and still operate for Stena Line. She was then laid up in Gdynia until 1988, when Fred Olsen, a Norwegian cruising company, bought the hull, which was unofficially named Bonanza. Olsen planned to move the hull to Bremen Vegesack Germany for completion, but it never happened and the hull remained in Gdynia. It was laid up for one more year, before Anonymous Naftiliaki Eteria Kritis (ANEK) bought her for $6.5 million. She was towed by Maersk Blazer to Eleusis Bay on 16 February, and by November she was moved to Perama to start completion.

Her early name was Kydon II after the company's first ship, but she was eventually renamed to her current name of Eleftherios Venizelos. She was delivered in June 1992 and deployed between Piraeus and Crete, but the ship had trouble getting into the port of Crete on windy days so she was put on another route. On 7 August she was deployed on the route Patras-Igoumenitsa-Corfu-Trieste during summer and between Piraeus and Heraklion during winter. She was the biggest and largest ferry in the Greek coastal service for 18 years, until the delivery of Cruise Olympia and Cruise Europa for Minoan Lines, and she remains the biggest and largest ferry flying the Greek flag.

=== 2000s ===
For summer 2003, ANEK agreed an advertising deal with Cosmote, a telecommunications firm. The ship was repainted with a new livery featuring Cosmote advertisements. She wore that livery until 2005. In the summer of 2004, the ship was chartered to the company Tunisia Ferries (also known as Compagnie Tunisienne de Navigation, or COTUNAV). In October, following her charter, she was deployed between Piraeus and Chania. On 5 October 2007, following her charter, she was deployed between Piraeus and Heraklion, and then on the Piraeus-Chania route from 2008 until 2011.

In 2010, she served on the Pireus-Tinos-Mykonos-Kos-Rhodes route before her annual charter. She was then returned to the Piraeus-Chania route in October. On 22 February 2011 she departed from Perama to Benghazi via Souda to help evacuate people from Libya.

Libya Evacuation 2011
Date	Event
2011 02 26	Arrived at Heraklion with 2923 passengers on board, departed the same day to Misurata.
2011 03 02	Arrived at Heraklion.
2011 03 03	Departed from Heraklion towards Souda.
2011 03 06 - 2011 03 08	Departed from Souda towards Misurata.
2011 03 09 - 2011 03 11	Departed from Misurata towards Alexandria with 2088 passengers on board.
2011 03 11	Departed from Alexandria towards Sirte.
2011 03 16	Laid on the rescue to Sirte for two days, then returned to Souda where the ship was laid up.

She arrived on Piraeus on 8 May. Between 16 and 22 May she was deployed between Piraeus-Chania before chartering to Tunisia. Afterwards, she was laid up in Perama, until 4 June 2012. At this time, she returned to the Piraeus-Chania line for replacing Lato until 21 April 2013, when she was chartered. Between 27 and 28 January 2014, she was used as a floating hotel in Argostoli, after an earthquake that had occurred. By 1 March she was laid up in Perama, before chartering in GoSardinia in July. During 2 to 15 September, she returned to Chania - Piraeus and then laid up in Salamina. Since 2017, she operates the Piraeus-Souda line again.

== Cruises ==
Because of her size, ANEK Lines often preserved the ship for cruises.

- 2003 10 21 - 2003 11 02. Between Chania - Piraeus - Thessaloniki - Istanbul - Odesa - Yalta - Trabzon - Thessaloniki - Piraeus - Chania.
- 2004 10 27 - 2004 11 09. Between Piraeus - Chania - Port Said - Alexandria - Benghazi - Tripoli - Gabès - Malta - Chania - Piraeus.
- 2005 02 01 - 2005 02 08. For Venice Carnival, between Patras - Igoumenitsa - Corfu - Venice and back.
- 2005 10 26 - 2005 11 07. Between Piraeus - Chania - Palermo - Cagliari - Ajaccio - Nice - Civitavecchia - Naples - Chania - Piraeus.
- 2006 02 21 - 2006 02 28. Between Patras - Igoumenitsa - Corfu - Venice, for carnival of Venice.
- 2006 11 05 - 2006 11 18. Between Piraeus - Chania - Tripoli - Tunis - Málaga - Mallorca - Naples - Chania - Piraeus.

== Charters ==
The ship was often leased to other companies, mainly outside of Greece.

- July 2001: To Italian authorities. Used as a hotel ship during the G8 meeting in Genoa, Italy for a week.
- June 2004: To Cotunav, Tunisia. Left Piraeus on 17 June and deployed on Tunis–Genoa / Marseille. She was chartered to this company each summer until 2011.
- May 2013: To SNCM. Left Piraeus on 19 May and deployed between Marseille–Algiers–Tunis–Corsica. Her charter ended abruptly during the same year, after a poor performance throughout the season on the line and the ship returned to Greece by September
- July 2014: To GoInSardinia. Left Piraeus on 11 July and deployed between Livorno–Olbia / Arbatax. This charter did not go well either.
- 14 August 2015: To Greek authorities and used as a floating hotel in Kos for refugees from Syria. By 19 August she was deployed between Mytilene - Piraeus for transporting refugees.
- June 2016: To Africa Morocco Link between Tanger Med and Algeciras. The charter failed, as the ship was too large to operate on a line where travel time lasts only two hours.

=== 2020 charting to Spain ===
In March 2020, she was chartered to a Turkish Company as a floating hotel for workers in Cádiz, Spain for 1.5 month. The charter was eventually cancelled due to the COVID-19 pandemic in Spain and Greece. On 30 March 2020, it was announced that El. Venizelos has three cases with coronavirus on board. On the ship there are 383 workers 36 Greeks, 150 Turkish, 82 Ukrainian, 83 Indonesian from Bulgaria, and from Kazakhstan. The ship first returned to Turkey to leave the Turkish workers but the Turkish authorities didn't allow to enter the Turkish port because the Turkish frontiers are closed. The ship returned to Piraeus, Greece but the Greek authorities didn't allow to enter the port. The ship now is Laid-Up in Piraeus Anchorage with 120 cases of coronavirus.

- 30 March: Ministry of Health of Greece announced 3 cases with COVID-19
- 31 March: Ministry of Health of Greece announced 20 cases with COVID-19
- 1 April: Ministry of Health of Greece announced 20 cases with COVID-19
- 2 April: Ministry of Health of Greece announced 119 cases with COVID-19
- 2 April: At 9 pm El. Venizelos moored at the Piraeus Port. The crew which don't have COVID-19 are going to be out and the foreigners will go to their countries but first they are going to put in a quarantine at a hotel. Now the 119 cases with the COVID-19 will remain to the ship at least 14 days more.

== 2018 fire incident ==
On 29 August 2018, after her departure from Piraeus, her garage was caught on fire. The ship was sailing 8 nm from Agios Georgios island, off Ydra. Over 1,000 people were on board, in addition to 80 trucks and 152 cars. The fire most likely began from a truck in the garage. The ship returned to Piraeus at 4.00 am as it. Passengers disembarked safely. In September the ship went to Perama for repairs and subsequently returned to service.

== Older liveries ==
During 2007–2013, the ship wore a blue-yellow diagonal stripe. it was also on her Tunisia Ferries charters. She also briefly wore an EU flag. During her usage for transporting refugees, she had a blue stripe.

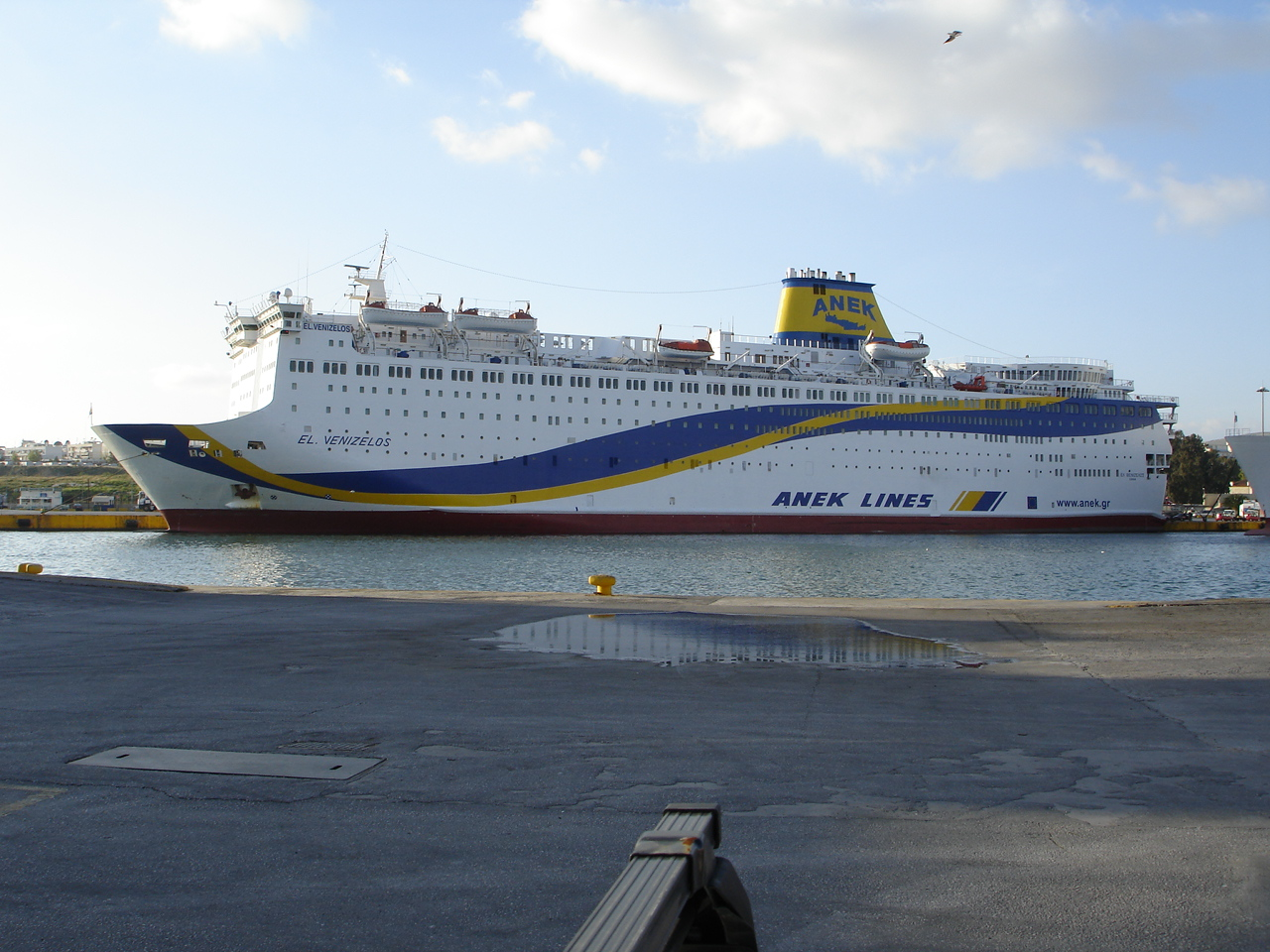
El Venizelos in Piraeus in 2007

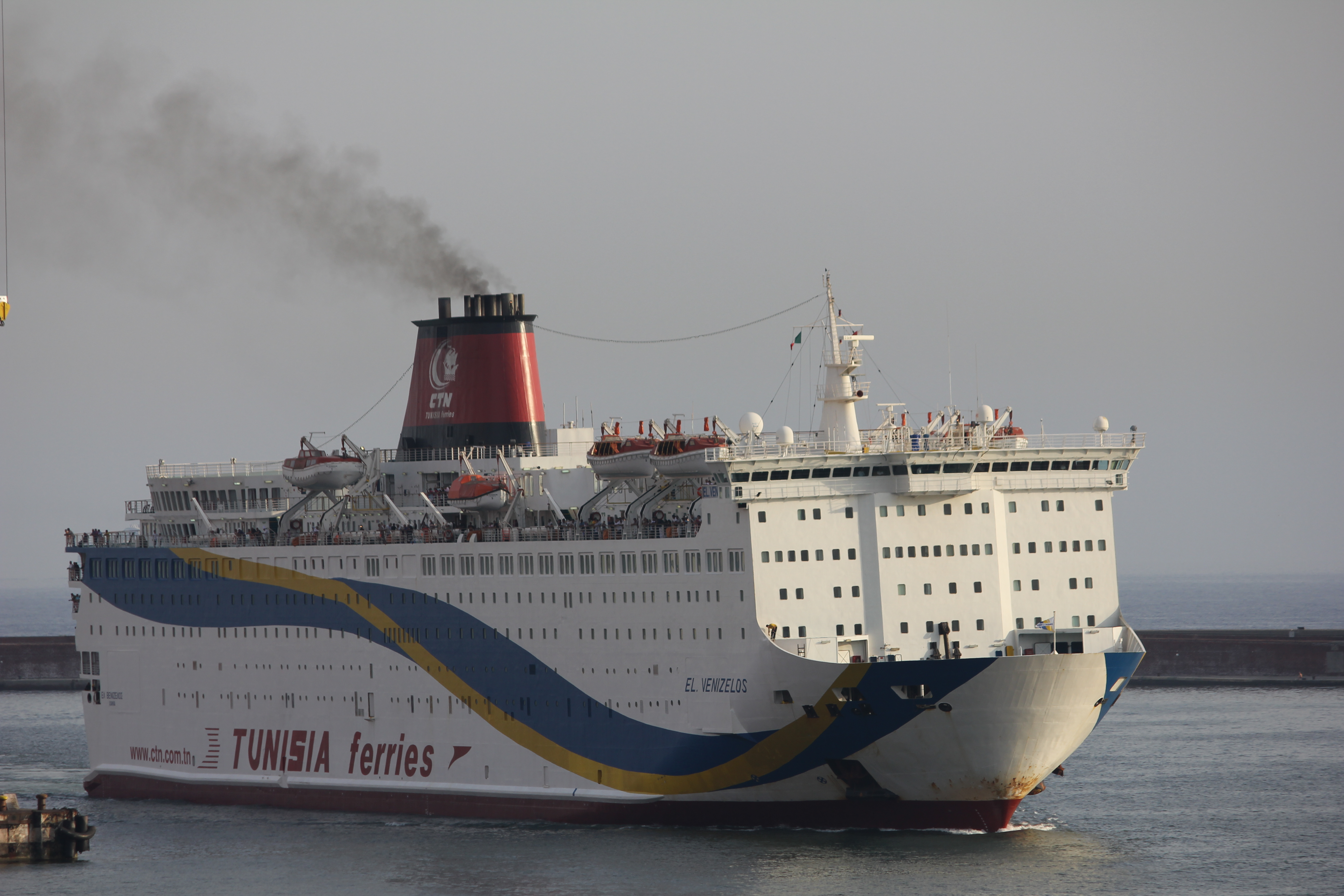
El Venizelos in Genova in 2011

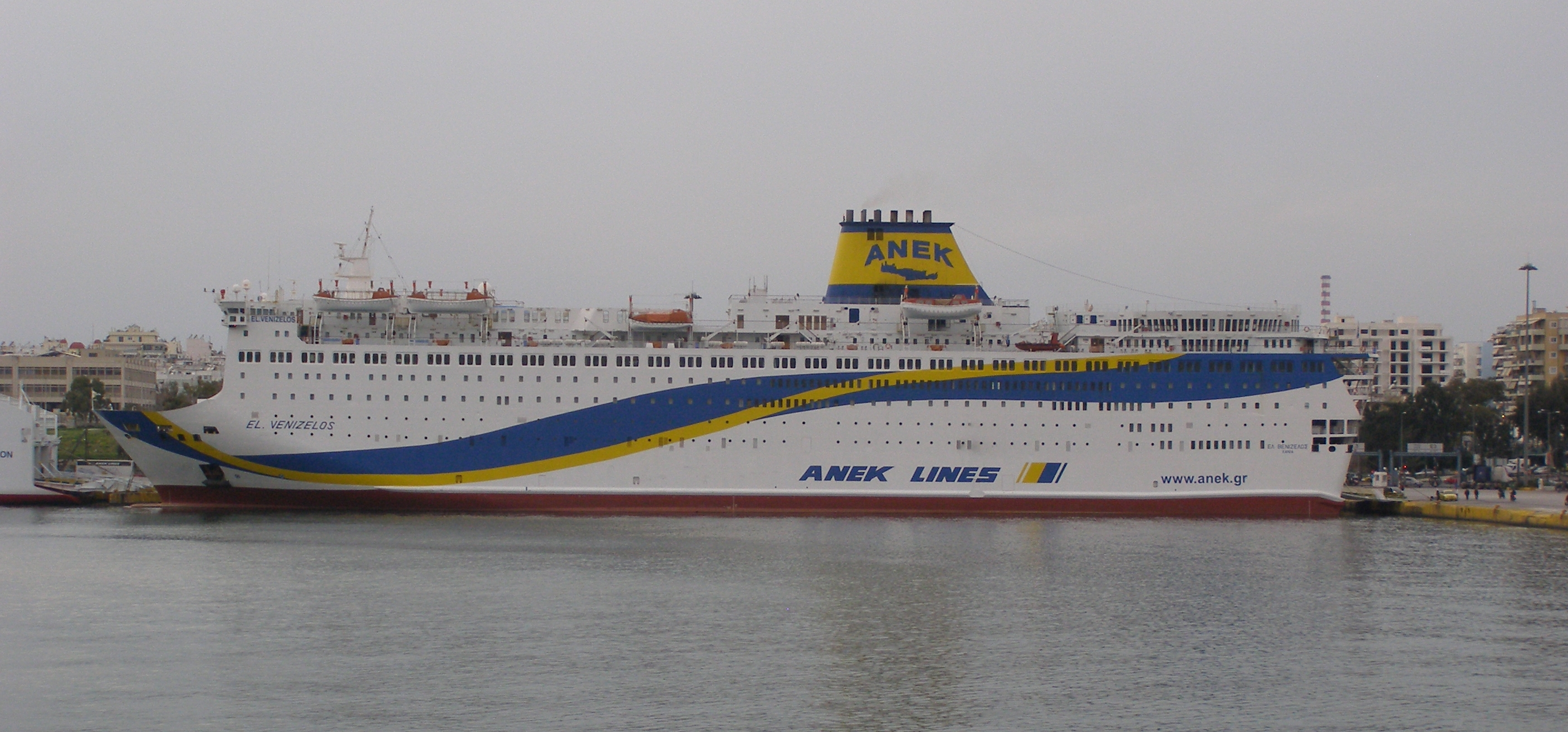
El Venizelos in Piraeus in 2013

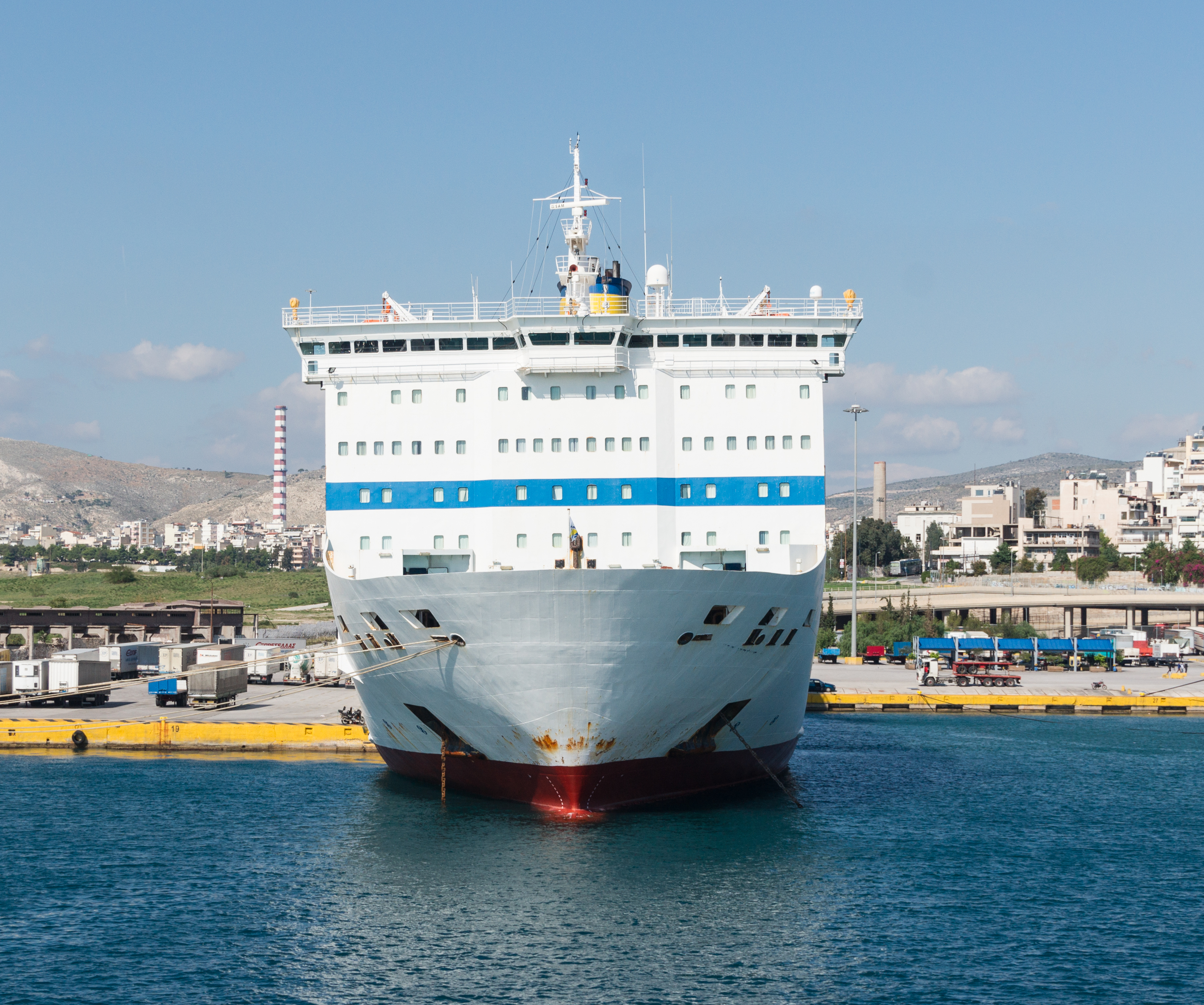
El. Venizelos in Piraeus in 2015
