= Blue Star Patmos =

Greek ropax fast ferry

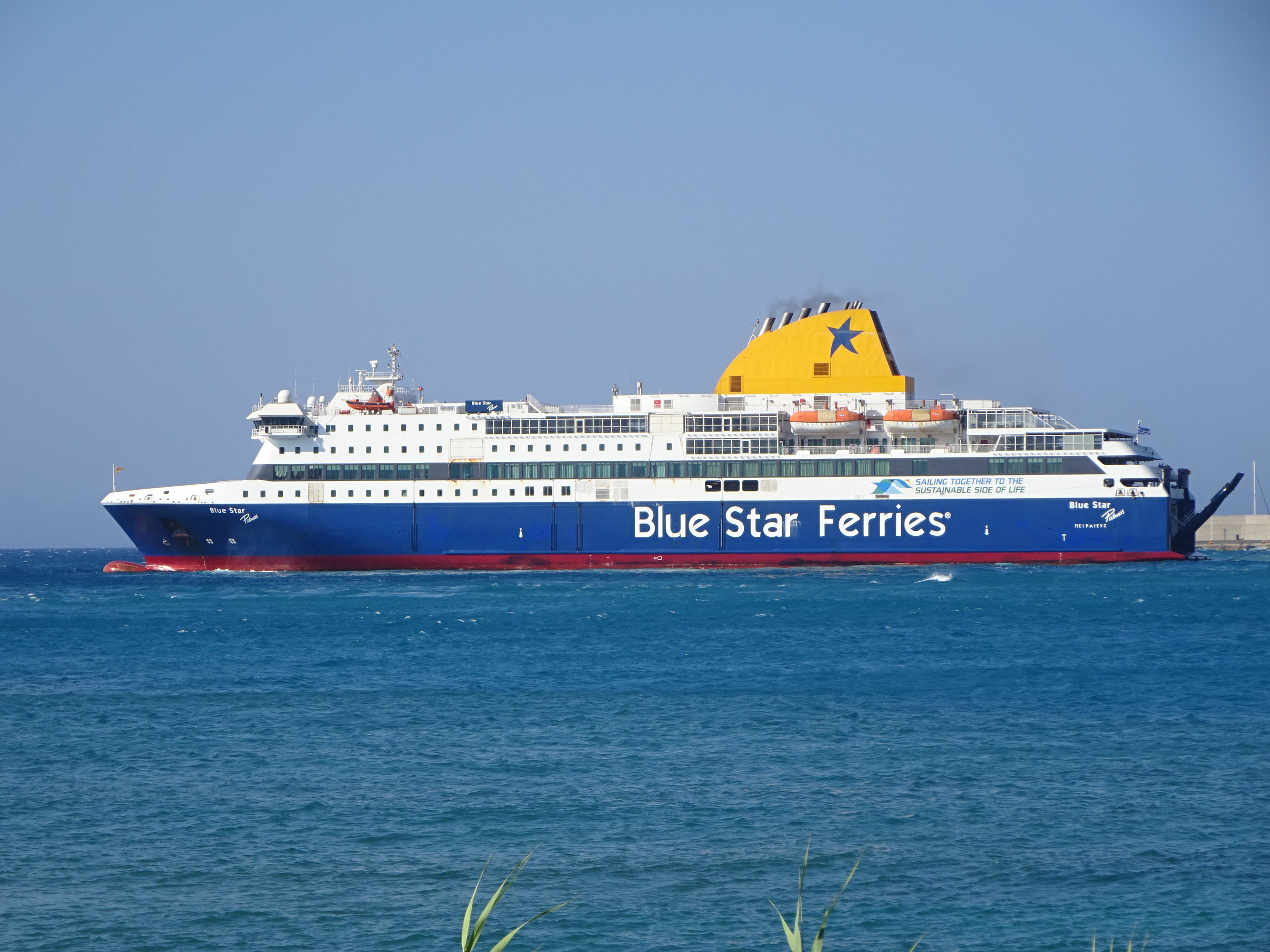
- Blue Star Patmos arriving at Rhodes

History
- Name: 2012–present: Blue Star Patmos
- Owner: 2012–present: Attica Group
- Operator: 2012–present: Blue Star Ferries
- Port of registry: 2012–present: Piraeus, Greece
- Route: Piraeus – Dodecanese / Cyclades / North Aegean; (e.g., Syros, Mykonos, Ikaria, Samos, Patmos, Lipsi, Leros, Kalymnos, Kos, Nisyros, Tilos, Symi, Rhodes, Kastellorizo)
- Ordered: June 2009
- Builder: Daewoo Shipbuilding & Marine Engineering (DSME); Geoje / Okpo, South Korea
- Cost: €70 million
- Yard number: 7510
- Laid down: 2010
- Launched: 27 June 2011
- Completed: 12 June 2012
- Acquired: June 2012
- Maiden voyage: 10 July 2012
- In service: 2012
- Identification: IMO number: 9565041; Call sign: SVBF8; MMSI number: 241159000
- Status: in service

General characteristics
- Class & type: DSME Custom Aegean Ro-Pax Ferry
- Tonnage: 18,664 GT; 2,775 DWT
- Length: 145.90 m (478 ft 8 in) (overall) / 136.70 m (448 ft 6 in) (waterline)
- Beam: 23.20 m (76 ft 1 in)
- Draught: 5.90 m (19 ft 4 in)
- Depth: 8.60 m (28 ft 3 in)
- Decks: 10
- Ramps: Dual stern vehicle loading ramps and passenger doors
- Installed power: 4 × MAN-B&W 16V32/40 main diesel engines (total 32,000 kW / 42,910 hp)
- Propulsion: 2 × controllable pitch propellers
- Speed: 24.0 knots (44.4 km/h; 27.6 mph) (service) / 26.0 knots (48.2 km/h; 29.9 mph) (max)
- Capacity: 2,000 passengers (91 cabins / 326 berths + 405 airseats); 430 cars or 600 lane metres for freight
- Crew: 80–100
- Notes: Sister ship to Blue Star Delos

Blue Star Patmos is a fast ferry operated by the Greek company Blue Star Ferries. Built between 2010 and 2012 by Daewoo Shipbuilding in South Korea, it has been sailing since July 2012 on Blue Star Ferries routes in the Aegean Sea.

== History ==
=== Origins and construction ===
At the dawn of the 2010s, Blue Star Ferries considered strengthening its fleet dedicated to serving the Aegean Sea archipelagos. Throughout the previous decade, the company had expanded its network with the opening of new routes to the Dodecanese and the North Aegean, in addition to its long-standing connections with the Cyclades. With this promising outlook, the shipping company placed an order for two new ferries with the South Korean shipyard Daewoo Shipbuilding & Marine Engineering (DSME).

Based on the design of the three previous Blue Star ferries—Ithaki, Paros, and Naxos —also built by the same shipyards, the new vessels represent a significant evolution compared to their predecessors. In addition to being larger and faster, they are also much more comfortable, despite a deliberately compact size to allow easy access to all ports.

The second of them, named Blue Star Patmos, was laid down at Okpo on June 23, 2010, and launched on June 27, 2011. After finishing work, it was delivered to Blue Star Ferries on June 12, 2012.

=== Service ===
After leaving South Korea to reach Greece, Blue Star Patmos arrived for the first time at Piraeus on July 9, 2012. The ship was then put into service on July 10, initially between Piraeus and the North Aegean.

During a technical stop in spring 2020, the ship was fitted with scrubbers, a flue gas cleaning device designed to reduce its sulfur emissions. Their installation required the enlargement of the funnel, which appears more massive, while retaining its original shape.

== Facilities ==
Blue Star Patmos has ten decks. Passenger quarters cover all of decks 6, 7 and 8. The crew is housed on the forward section of deck 5. Decks 3 and 4 are entirely dedicated to the garage, as well as the aft section of deck 5 and the forward sections of decks 1 and 2.

=== Common areas ===
The common area facilities aboard Blue Star Patmos are located on decks 6, 7 and 8. The ship is equipped with a snack bar at the rear, a self-service restaurant and a lounge reserved for economy class on deck 6, a lounge and bar reserved for business class as well as an outdoor bar on deck 7 and finally, several outdoor areas on deck 8. The ship also has a shop.

=== Cabins ===
Blue Star Patmos has 90 cabins located mostly on deck 7 but also on deck 8, towards the front of the ship. Accommodating two to four people, all cabins have private bathrooms including shower, toilet and sink.

== Features ==
The vessel is 145.90 meters long and 23.20 meters wide, with a tonnage of 18,664 GT. The ship has a passenger capacity of 2,000 passengers and a garage with space for 600 vehicles spread over three and a half levels. The garage is accessible via two ramp doors located at the stern. Blue Star Patmos is powered by four MAN-B&W 16V32/40 diesel engines, each producing 32,000 kW of power, driving two propellers that propel the vessel at a maximum speed of 26 knots. The ship carries four large lifeboats, a rigid inflatable rescue boat, and several life rafts.

== Routes served ==
Since its commissioning, Blue Star Patmos has been assigned to the Blue Star Ferries lines in the Aegean Sea and serves the archipelagos of the Cyclades, the Dodecanese or the North Aegean from Piraeus depending on the period.

== Accidents and Incidents ==
=== 2017 Grounding (Ios) ===
On August 30, 2017, while entering the port of Ios, Blue Star Patmos ran aground in shallow waters at around 1:30 a.m. The 205 passengers and 87 crew members were safely evacuated and brought ashore by other ships and fishing boats that had responded to the distress call. Blue Star Patmos was refloated on September 8 and taken to Piraeus. It was then repaired at the Perama shipyard.

==== 2026 Grounding (Kastellorizo) ====
On the morning of 2 February, the ro-ro passenger ferry Blue Star Patmos allided with the pier while attempting to dock at Megisti on the island of Kastellorizo, Greece. The incident occurred during adverse weather conditions and resulted in hull damage near the vessel's port stern. No injuries were reported among the passengers or crew, and no environmental pollution was released. While initial inspections characterized the hull damage as minor, the ferry was subsequently removed from active service and shifted to a dry dock facility to undergo permanent structural repairs.
