= Varuna (disambiguation) =

Varuna is a Hindu god. Varuna may also refer to:

- Mitra–Varuna, dual Hindu deities, incorporating Mitra and Varuna
- Mitra-Varuna (Indo-European), deities in Proto Indo-European religion

== Places ==
- Varuna River, a minor tributary of the Ganges River in India
- Varuna Village, a village in Mysore district of India
- 20000 Varuna, a trans-Neptunian object

== Vessels ==
- USS Varuna, two vessels
- INS Varuna, an Indian Navy sail training vessel
- SS Varuna, a steamship operating in Canada - see Murray Canal
- Varuna, former Japanese name of ferry Lefka Ori (ship)

== People ==
- Varuna Shetty, 21st century Indian actress
- Varuna Waragoda (born 1971), Sri Lankan first-class cricketer

== Other uses ==
- Varuna (crab), a genus of thoracotrematan crabs
- Varuna naval exercises, annual exercises involving the French and Indian navies
- Canadian Vickers Varuna, a Canadian flying boat of the 1920s
- Varuna, The Writers' House, former home of novelist Eleanor Dark, now a writers' centre in Katoomba, New South Wales, Australia
- Varuna (book), a 1907 political literature book by German social Darwinist and racialist Willibald Hentschel
- Varuna (album), debut album by indie rock band The Republic Of Wolves

== See also ==
- Varun (disambiguation)
- Waruna (disambiguation)
- Piz Varuna, a mountain in the Alps on the border between Italy and Switzerland
