= Varun Sharma (disambiguation) =

Varun Sharma (born 1990) is an Indian actor and comedian.

Varun Sharma may also refer to:

- Varun Sharma (cricketer) (born 1987), Indian cricketer
- Varun Sharma (actor) (born 1994), Indian television actor

== See also ==
- Varun (disambiguation)
