= Blue Star Paros =

Greek ropax ferry

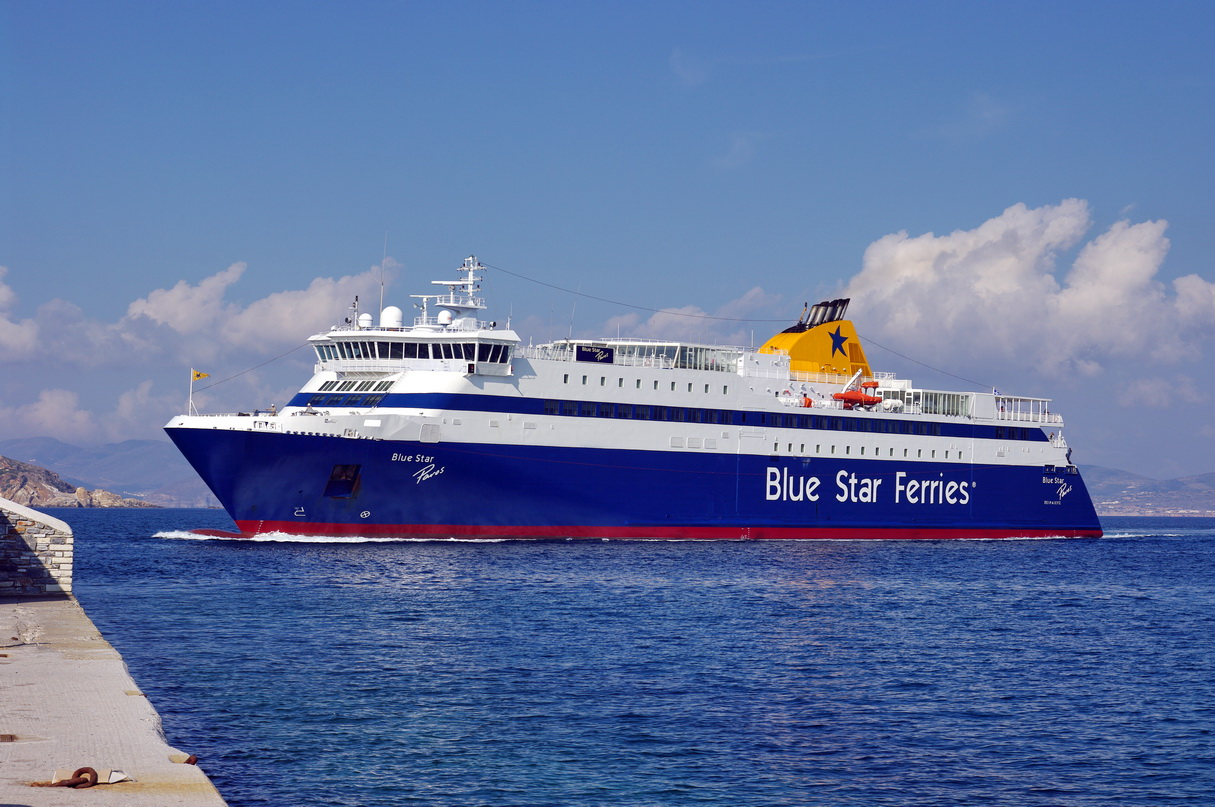
- Blue Star Paros in Naxos

History

Greece
- Name: Blue Star Paros; Blue Star Santorini (intended/during construction)
- Owner: Attica Group (2002–present)
- Operator: Blue Star Ferries (2002–present)
- Port of registry: Piraeus, Greece
- Ordered: 6 November 2000
- Builder: Daewoo Shipbuilding & Marine Engineering (DSME), South Korea
- Yard number: 7507
- Laid down: 26 July 2001
- Launched: 15 November 2001
- Completed: 17 April 2002
- Identification: IMO number: 9241774; MMSI: 239924000; Call sign: SVJH
- Status: In service

General characteristics
- Type: Ro-pax ferry
- Tonnage: 10,438 GT
- Length: 124.20 m (407.5 ft)
- Beam: 18.90 m (62.0 ft)
- Draft: 5.10 m (16.7 ft)
- Installed power: 17,000 kW (Total)
- Propulsion: 4 × Wärtsilä NSD 9L32 diesel engines
- Speed: 24.4 knots (service); 28 knots (max)
- Capacity: 1,474 passengers; 240 cars (360 lane meters)

Blue Star Paros is a fast Ro-Ro passenger ferry built in 2002 by Daewoo Shipbuilding for Blue Star Ferries. A sister ship to Blue Star Naxos, the vessel accommodates 1,474 passengers and 240 vehicles, primarily serving the Cyclades island routes from the port of Piraeus.

== Service ==
Launched on 15 November 2001 at the Daewoo Shipbuilding & Marine Engineering Co. Ltd shipyard in Okpo with the name Blue Star Paros. The ferry was originally planned to be named Blue Star Santorini. The vessel was delivered in February 2002 to the Greek Blue Star Ferries, she entered service the following March on the routes between Piraeus,Paros, Naxos, Santorini and Amorgos. Subsequently, it was transferred to the connections between Piraeus, Syros, Tinos and Mykonos, where it still operates today.

== Accidents and Incidents ==
=== 2010 collision (Donoussa) ===
On October 21, 2010, the Blue Star Paros sustained minor damage after slightly striking the pier during departure maneuvers from the port of Donoussa. The vessel, carrying 65 passengers and 66 crew members, was operating a scheduled route from Astypalaia to Aegiali, Donoussa, Naxos, and Piraeus. The collision caused an indentation on the port bow above the waterline, but no injuries were reported.

The ship safely docked at Naxos shortly after, where local port authorities temporarily prohibited its departure. Following an emergency inspection and the issuance of a class maintenance certificate by its classification society, the vessel was cleared to resume its voyage to Paros and Piraeus later that afternoon.

=== 2016 collision (Piraeus) ===
On January 11, 2016, while maneuvering to dock at the port of Piraeus, the Blue Star Paros collided with the pier, sustaining damage to its bulbous bow. The vessel was arriving from a scheduled itinerary originating in Mykonos, with stops at Tinos and Syros, carrying 274 passengers. No marine pollution was reported. Following safe docking and passenger disembarkation, one passenger reported to the local port authorities that she and her mother had sustained minor injuries after another passenger fell on them during the exit. The Piraeus Port Authority launched a preliminary investigation and temporarily detained the vessel until repairs were completed and a certificate of seaworthiness was issued by its classification society.

=== 2018 collision (Syros) ===
August 11, 2018, during departure maneuvers from the port of Syros, Blue Star Paros was pushed by strong crosswinds, causing its partially raised right stern passenger ramp to strike a harbor mooring bollard. The impact severed the support base of the ramp's left hinge and caused a malfunction in its hydraulic operating system. The vessel—which was en route from Mykonos and Tinos to the port of Piraeus with 1,356 passengers and 224 vehicles on board—was temporarily detained by the Syros Port Authority, prompting the transfer of 225 passengers to their destination via another scheduled route. After successful temporary repairs to the passenger ramp and the submission of a class maintenance certificate from its classification society, the Blue Star Paros was cleared to sail in the early morning hours.

== Sister ships ==
- Blue Star Naxos
- Fundy Rose
