= Varun =

Varun is a male given name of Indian origin. It originally referred to Varuna, a Vedic deity associated with the sky, celestial ocean, and cosmic order of Ṛta. He is traditionally depicted as the guardian of moral order and all of the waters. Its etymology is derived from the Sanskrit root vṛ, meaning “to cover” or “to encompass". Varun or Varoon, also appears among the traditional names of Ahura Mazda in Persian Zoroastrianism, reflective of the broader shared Indo-Iranian linguistic, cultural, and ancient Aryan heritage of the Vedic and Iranian traditions.

Notable people with the name include:

== People ==
- Varun Aaron (born 1989), Indian cricketer
- Varun Agarwal (born 1987), Indian entrepreneur
- Varun Badola (born 1974), Indian actor
- Varun Singh Bhati (born 1995), Indian para high jumper
- Varun Chopra (born 1987), English cricketer
- Varun Dhawan (born 1987), Indian actor
- Varun Gandhi (born 1980), Indian politician
- Varun Grover (information scientist) (born 1959), American computer scientist
- Varun Grover (writer) (born 1980), Indian comedian, screenwriter and lyricist
- Varun Kapoor, Indian actor
- Varun Khandelwal, Indian actor
- Varun Khanna (born 1984), Indian cricketer
- Varun Kumar (cricketer) (born 1980), Indian cricketer
- Varun Kumar (field hockey) (born 1995), Indian hockey player
- Varun Ram (born 1992), American basketball player
- Varun Sahni (born 1956), Indian physicist
- Varun Sandesh (born 1989), Indian-American actor
- Varun Sharma (born 1990), Indian film actor
- Varun Sharma (cricketer) (born 1987), Indian cricketer
- Varun Sharma (actor) (born 1990), Indian actor
- Varun Shrivastava, Indian social activist
- Varun Sivaram, American engineer
- Varun Sood (cricketer) (born 1990), Indian cricketer
- Varun Sood (actor), Indian film actor
- Varun Tej, Indian actor
- Varun Toorkey (born 1990), Indian television actor and model
- Varun Unni (born 1989), Indian film composer and singer

== Places ==
- Varun, Iran (disambiguation)

== See also ==
- Varuna (disambiguation)
- Barun (disambiguation)
