= Waruna =

Waruna may refer to:

- Waruna language, a Papuan language
- Varuna, a Hindu water deity

== People ==
- Waruna Lakshan, Sri Lankan javelin thrower
- Waruna Shantha, Sri Lankan cricketer
- Waruna Waragoda, Sri Lankan cricketer

== See also ==
- Varuna (disambiguation)
