= Blue Star Delos =

Greek ropax ferry

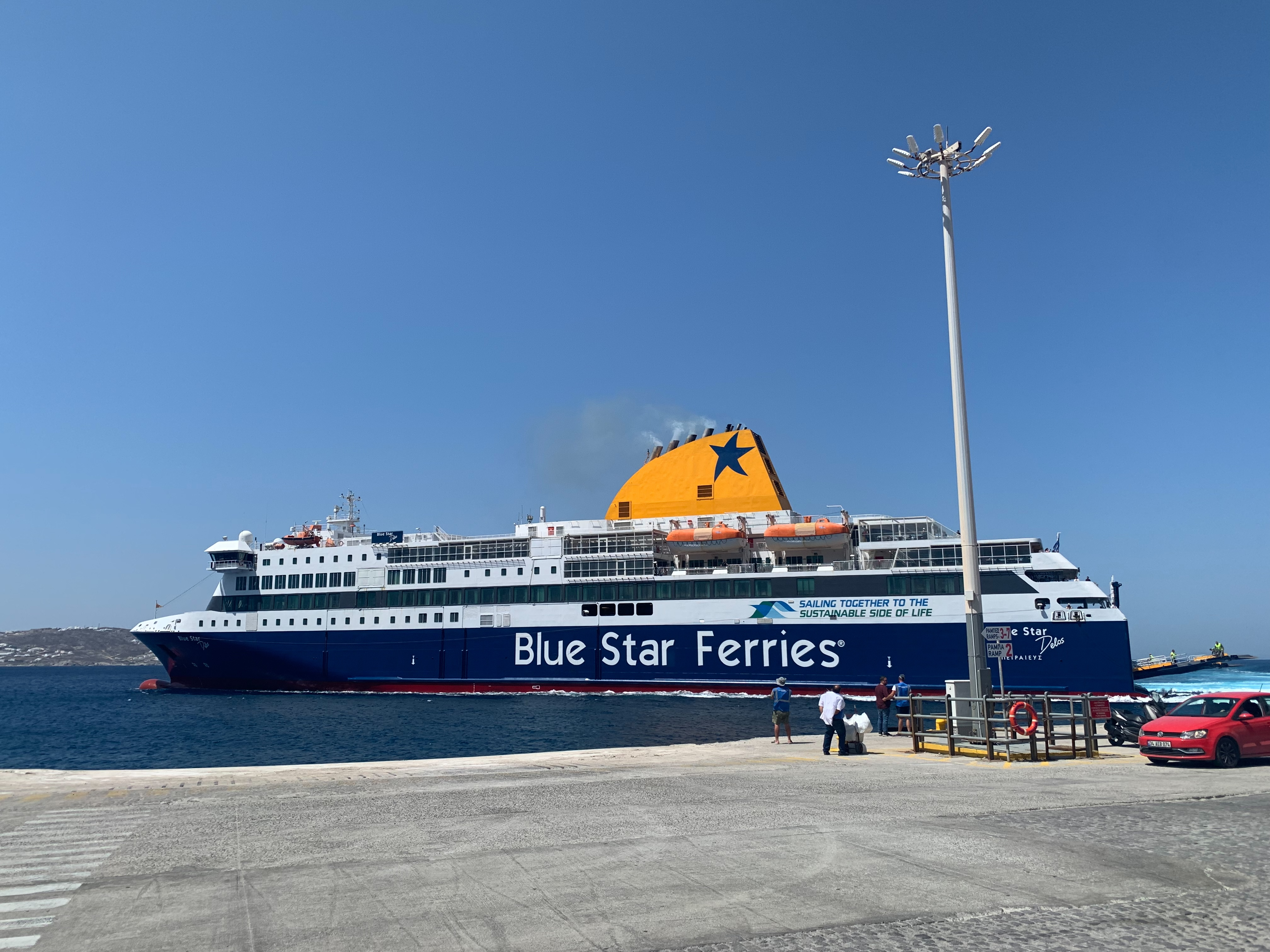
- Blue Star Delos at Mykonos

History
- Name: Blue Star Delos
- Owner: Attica Group
- Operator: Blue Star Ferries
- Port of registry: Piraeus, Greece
- Route: Piraeus–Paros–Naxos–Santorini-Ios
- Ordered: 25 June 2009
- Builder: Daewoo Shipbuilding & Marine Engineering (DSME)
- Yard number: 7509
- Launched: November 2010
- Completed: October 2011
- Maiden voyage: November 2011
- In service: 2011
- Identification: IMO number: 9565039; Call sign: SVBF7; MMSI number: 241087000
- Status: in service

General characteristics
- Type: Ro-Pax ferry
- Tonnage: 18,498 GT
- Length: 145.90 m (478 ft 8 in)
- Beam: 23.2 m (76 ft 1 in)
- Draft: 5.9 m (19 ft 4 in)
- Decks: 9
- Installed power: 32,000 kW (43,000 hp)
- Propulsion: 4 × MAN B&W 16V32/40 diesel engines
- Speed: 25.5 knots (47.2 km/h; 29.3 mph)
- Capacity: 2,400 passengers; 427 vehicles

Blue Star Delos is a fast ferry operated by the Greek company Blue Star Ferries. Built between 2010 and 2011 by Daewoo Shipbuilding in South Korea, it has been sailing since November 2011 on Blue Star Ferries routes in the Aegean Sea.

== Origins and construction ==
At the dawn of the 2010s, Blue Star Ferries considered strengthening its fleet dedicated to serving the Aegean Sea archipelagos. Throughout the previous decade, the company had expanded its network with the opening of new routes to the Dodecanese and the North Aegean, in addition to its long-standing connections with the Cyclades. With this promising outlook, the shipping company placed an order for two new ferries with the South Korean shipyard Daewoo Shipbuilding & Marine Engineering (DSME).

Based on the design of the three previous Blue Star ferries—Ithaki, Paros, and Naxos —also built by the same shipyards, the new vessels represent a significant evolution compared to their predecessors. In addition to being larger and faster, they are also much more comfortable, despite a deliberately compact size to allow easy access to all ports.

The first ship, named Blue Star Delos, was launched on November 20, 2010. After finishing work, it underwent sea trials on June 5 and 6, 2011 before being delivered to Blue Star Ferries on October 18.

== Service ==
On October 20, 2011, Blue Star Delos departed South Korea bound for Greece. After several weeks at sea, it arrived at Piraeus on November 9. Its commercial service began on November 15, operating between Piraeus and the Cyclades.

During a technical stop carried out during the winter of 2020–2021, the ship was fitted with scrubbers, a flue gas cleaning device designed to reduce its sulfur emissions. Their installation required the enlargement of the funnel, which appears more massive, while retaining its original shape.

== Facilities ==
Blue Star Delos has ten decks. Passenger quarters cover all of decks 6, 7 and 8. The crew is housed on the forward section of deck 5. Decks 3 and 4 are entirely dedicated to the garage, as well as the aft section of deck 5 and the forward sections of decks 1 and 2.

=== Common areas ===
Blue Star Delos' facilities are located on decks 6, 7 and 8. The ship is equipped with a snack bar at the rear, a self-service restaurant and a lounge reserved for economy class on deck 6, a lounge and bar reserved for business class as well as an outdoor bar on deck 7 and finally, several outdoor areas on deck 8. The ship also has a shop.

=== Cabins ===
Blue Star Delos has 32 cabins located mostly on deck 7 but also on deck 8, towards the front of the ship. Accommodating two to four people, all cabins have private bathrooms including shower, toilet and sink.

== Features ==
Blue Star Delos is 145.90 meters (478 ft 8 in) long and 23.20 meters (76 ft 1 in) wide, and assessed at 18,498 gross tonnage (GT). The ship has a passenger capacity of 2,000 and a garage with space for 600 vehicles spread over three and a half levels. The garage is accessible via two ramp doors located at the stern. Blue Star Delos is powered by four MAN-B&W 16V32/40 diesel engines, each producing 32,000 kilowatts (43,000 hp) of power, driving two propellers that propel the vessel at a speed of 26 knots (48 km/h; 30 mph). The ship carries four large lifeboats, a rigid inflatable rescue boat, and several life rafts. Since 2021, Blue Star Delos has been equipped with scrubbers, a system designed to reduce its sulfur emissions.

== Routes served ==
Since its commissioning, Blue Star Delos has been assigned to the Blue Star Ferries lines in the Aegean Sea and serves the archipelagos of the Cyclades, the Dodecanese or the North Aegean from Piraeus depending on the period.

== See also ==
- Blue Star Patmos
