= Diagoras (ship) =

Greek ferry

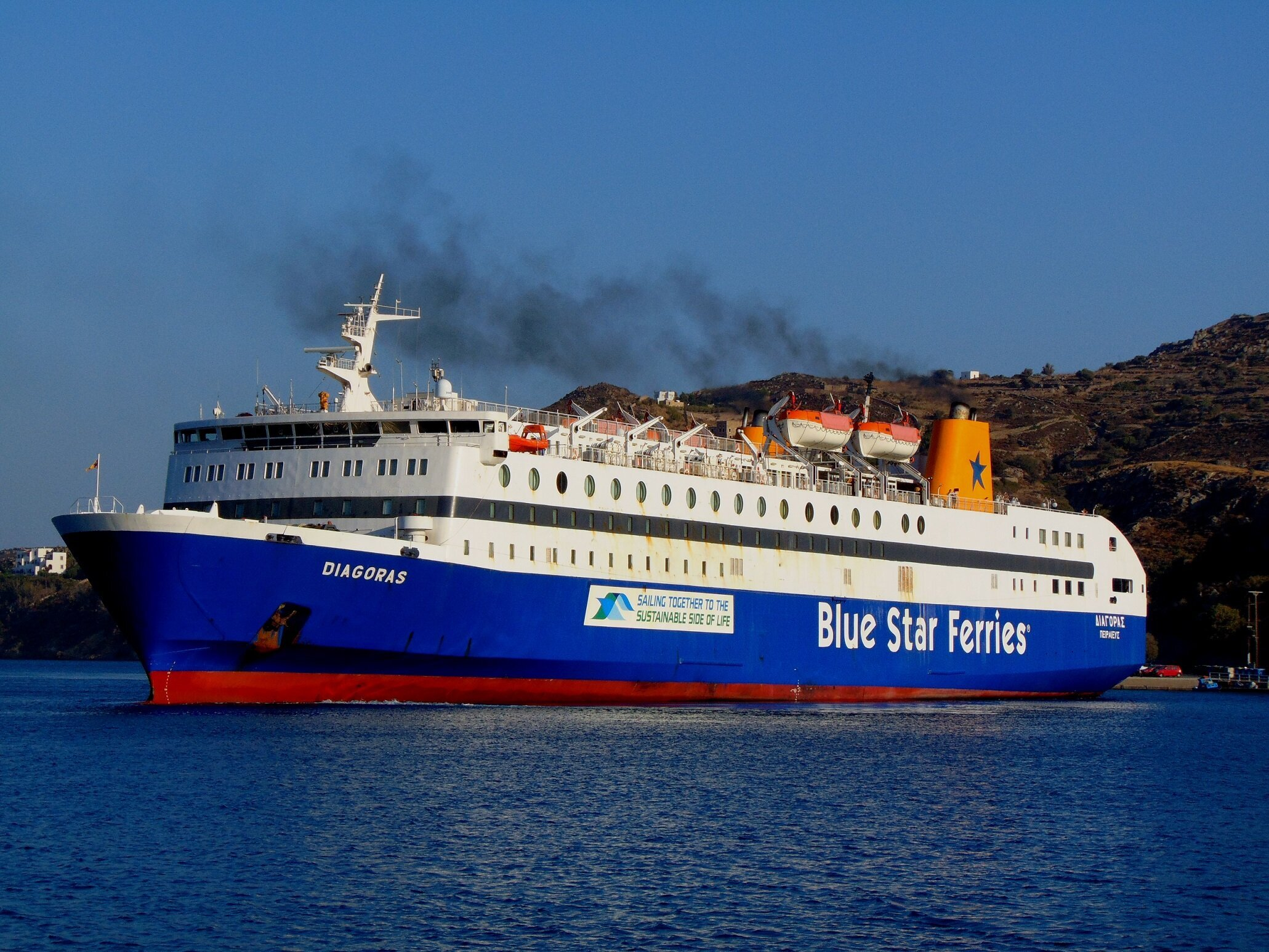
- Diagoras in Patmos

History

Greece
- Name: Diagoras (2001–present); New Tosa (1990–2000); Panagia Skiadeni (2000); Lindos (2000–2001)
- Owner: Osaka Kochi Tokkyu Ferry (1990–2000) DANE Sea Line (2000–2006) Attica Group (2006–present)
- Operator: Osaka Kochi Tokkyu Ferry (1990–2000); DANE Sea Line (2001–2004); Blue Star Ferries (2006–2016, 2018–present); Africa Morocco Link (2016–2017)
- Port of registry: Piraeus, Greece
- Builder: Naikai Zosen, Setoda, Japan
- Yard number: 548
- Launched: 25 December 1989
- Completed: March 1990
- Identification: IMO number: 8916126; MMSI: 241591000; Call sign: SVCT4
- Status: In service

General characteristics
- Type: Ro-pax ferry
- Tonnage: 15,362 GT
- Length: 141.5 m (464 ft 3 in)
- Beam: 23.0 m (75 ft 6 in)
- Draft: 5.7 m (18 ft 8 in)
- Propulsion: 2 × Niigata-Pielstick 12PC2-6V diesel engines
- Speed: 22.5 knots (41.7 km/h; 25.9 mph) (max)
- Capacity: 1,465 passengers; 274 cars (634 lane meters); 400 berths (131 cabins)

Diagoras (Διαγόρας, Diagóras ) is a ferry of the Greek company Blue Star Ferries. Built between 1989 and 1990 at the Naikai Zōsen shipyard in Setoda for the Japanese company Ōsaka Kōchi Tokkyu Ferry, it was originally named New Tosa (ニューとさ, Nyū Tosa ). Commissioned in March 1990 on the routes between Osaka, Kochi, and the island of Shikoku, it was resold in April 2000 to the Greek company DANE Sea Line. Transformed and renamed Diagoras, it began a new career in the Aegean Sea operating between Piraeus and the island of Rhodes in the Dodecanese archipelago. Laid up in 2004 due to the bankruptcy of DANE Sea Line, it was acquired in 2006 by Blue Star Ferries, which put it back into service under its colors, still sailing to the Dodecanese. Transferred to the fleet of Africa Morocco Link in 2016, it sailed briefly between Morocco and Spain before returning to the Blue Star Ferries fleet. It currently serves the North Aegean region.

== History ==
=== Origins and construction ===
New Tosa was ordered in the late 1980s by the Japanese company Ōsaka Kōchi Tokkyu Ferry to replace the Ferry Naniwa on the routes connecting Ōsaka and the island of Shikoku. The vessel was designed as a sister ship to the ferry New Katsura, which entered service in 1981. However, it has some minor differences from its predecessor, such as its slightly larger tonnage.

Built by the Naikai Zōsen shipyards in Setoda, New Tosa was launched on 25 December 1989. After a few months of finishing work, it was delivered to Osaka Kōchi Tokkyu Ferry on 12 March 1990.

=== Service ===
==== Osaka Kochi Tokkyu Ferry (1990–2000) ====
New Tosa entered service in March 1990 operating between Osaka and Kochi. It sailed alongside New Katsura, a sister ship nine years its senior. The ship continued its uneventful career throughout the 1990s before the Osaka Kochi Tokkyu Ferry company decided to replace it with a smaller vessel at the end of the decade. Withdrawn from service following the entry into the fleet of the Ferry Kōchi in August 2000, New Tosa was sold to the Greek company DANE Sea Line.

==== DANE Sea Line (2000-2004) ====
Renamed Panagia Skiadeni, the ship left Japan in September for Greece Arriving at the Perama shipyards in October, it was renamed Lindos and refitted for its future deployment in the Aegean Sea. Significant modifications were made to the interiors, including the installation of new facilities and private cabins. Following the completion of the work, in September 2001 the ship was renamed Diagoras.

On 17 September 2001, the ship began its career under the DANE Sea Line banner, operating between Piraeus and Rhodes in the Dodecanese archipelago. However, the company was experiencing significant financial difficulties. To reduce operating costs, Diagoras was chartered during the winter by ANEK Lines, which operated it between Piraeus and Crete. Despite this, DANE Sea Line ceased operations in 2004, leading to the ship's decommissioning at Piraeus starting in June. In November, an initial auction was held but ultimately failed, and Diagoras remained laid up for nearly two years until its acquisition by Blue Star Ferries in July 2006, following another auction.

==== Blue Star Ferries (since 2006) ====
After a brief stay at the Eleusis shipyards where it was refurbished and repainted in Blue Star Ferries colors, Diagoras resumed its commercial service on 11 August 2006 between Piraeus and the Dodecanese. In addition to Rhodes, the ship now serves the islands of Astypalea, Kalymnos, and Kos. During the summer of 2009, it exceptionally served the North Aegean and the Dodecanese from Thessaloniki .

In June 2016 Attica Group, parent company of Blue Star Ferries, decided to transfer the ship to another of its subsidiaries, Africa Morocco Link (AML), which operates routes between Morocco and Spain. Diagoras joined the Moroccan company's fleet on 24 June. On this occasion, it was registered under the Moroccan flag. The ship subsequently began its rotations between Tangier and Algeciras in July. Diagoras was operated by AML until December 2017 before returning to Blue Star Ferries. Back with the Greek company, the ship was deployed on routes between Piraeus and the North Aegean.

== Facilities ==
Diagoras has eight decks. While the ship actually spans nine decks, one is absent, serving as a car deck to allow for cargo transport. Passenger quarters occupy all of decks 5 and 6 and part of decks 4 and 7, while the crew is housed at the front of deck 4. Decks 2 and 3 contain the car decks.

=== Common areas ===
During the ship's Japanese period, passengers had access to a snack bar, several lounges, an arcade, and a television area.

Since the renovations carried out between 2000 and 2001, the ship has been equipped with an à la carte restaurant, a self-service restaurant, and two lounge bars.

=== Cabins ===
Initially, New Tosa was equipped with private cabins in 1st class and dormitories in 2nd class. The ship has around one hundred private cabins, mostly located on deck 5 but also on decks 7 and 4, for a total of 400 berths. All cabins have private bathrooms including shower, toilet, and sink.

== Features ==
Diagoras is 141.54 meters (464 ft 4 in) long and 23 meters (75 ft 6 in) wide, and it was initially assessed at 6,939 gross tonnage (GT), before being increased to 15,362 GT during its 2001 refit. In its initial configuration, it could accommodate 1,070 passengers and 35 vehicles in a spacious garage that could also hold 103 trailers, accessible via a forward axial ramp door and a starboard aft side ramp door. Following the 2001 refit, the ship can accommodate 1,200 passengers and 400 vehicles. Its garage access was modified, the forward door was sealed, and the aft side door was removed and replaced with an axial door. Diagoras is powered by two Pielstick-Niigata 12PC2-6V400 diesel engines, developing 9,788 kilowatts (13,126 hp) of power and driving two propellers, propelling the vessel at a speed of 21 knots (39 km/h; 24 mph). It is also equipped with a bow thruster and a roll stabilizer. At the time, safety equipment consisted primarily of life rafts and a rigid inflatable rescue boat. Since 2001, the ship has been equipped with four medium-sized, enclosed lifeboats.

== Routes served ==
From 1990 to 2000, New Tosa sailed for the Ōsaka Kōchi Tokkyu Ferry company on the routes between Ōsaka and Kōchi on the island of Shikoku.

Between 2001 and 2004, the ship served DANE Sea Line routes in the Aegean Sea between Piraeus and the island of Rhodes in the Dodecanese archipelago . It then continued its career under the Blue Star Ferries banner from 2006 onwards, operating between Piraeus, Astypalea, Kalymnos, Kos, and Rhodes, and then between Thessaloniki, Lesbos, Chios, Samos, Kalymnos, Kos, and Rhodes in 2009. In July 2016 and December 2017 the vessel sailed between Morocco and Spain on the Tangier – Algeciras route for the company Africa Morocco Link.

Since 2018, the ship has been assigned to the routes between Piraeus and the North Aegean archipelago and serves the islands of Chios and Lesbos.

== Accidents and Incidents ==
On 30 August 2024, during its departure from the port of Kavala, the vessel made contact with the southern breakwater. The impact caused paint abrasions on the port side above the waterline. The ship was operating a scheduled itinerary to Lemnos, Mytilene, Chios, Karlovasi, and Vathy on Samos, carrying 923 passengers, 198 cars, 7 trucks, 5 buses, and 9 motorcycles.

The vessel returned to Kavala and docked safely. The Central Port Authority of Kavala initially issued a detention order. However, following the presentation of a certificate maintaining its class by its monitoring classification society, the vessel was cleared to depart and resume its scheduled voyage. No injuries or marine pollution were reported.
