= Superfast V (2026) =

Ropax ferry

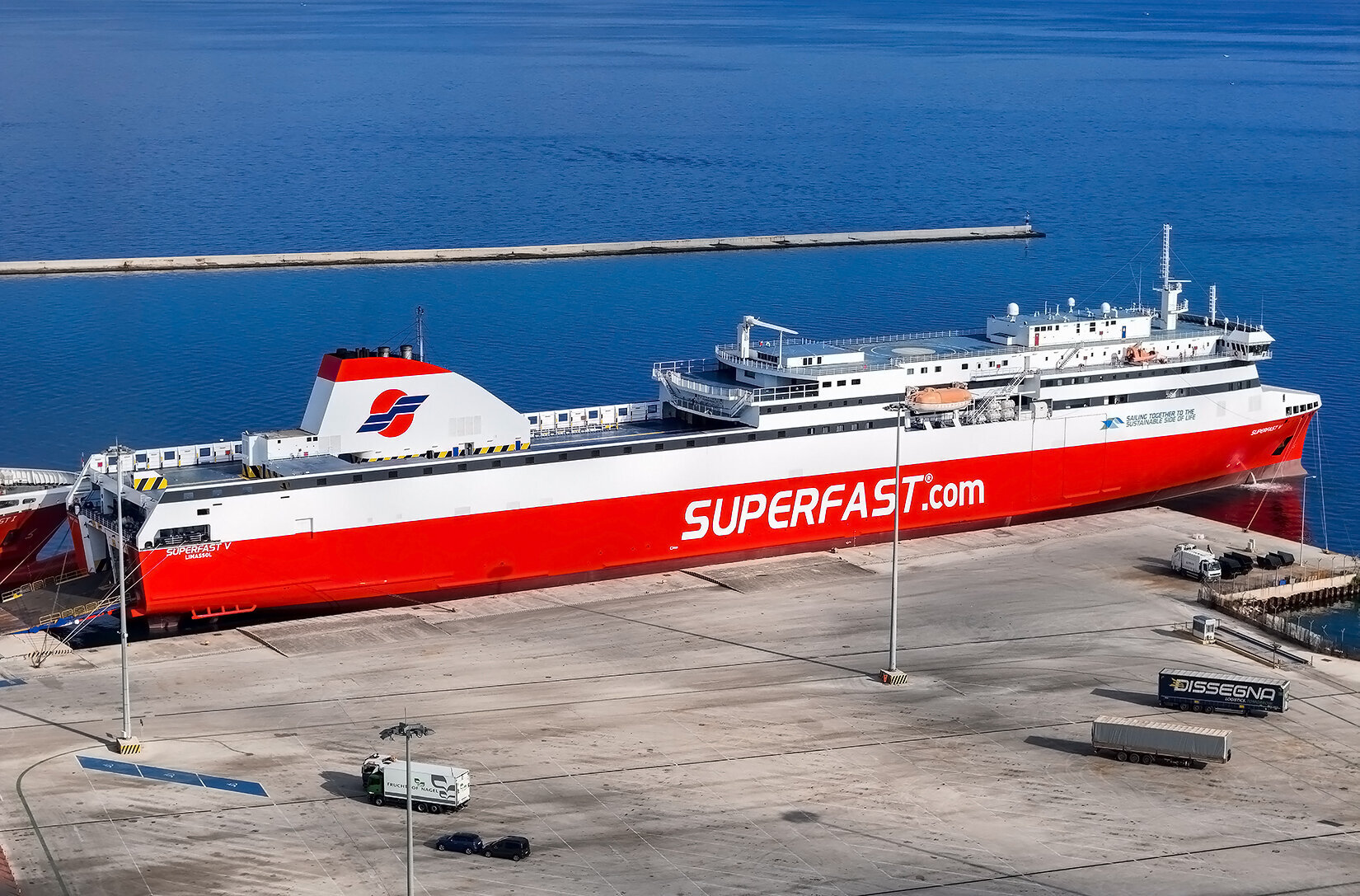
- Superfast V in Patras

History
- Name: (2021–2026): GNV Bridge; (2026–present): Superfast V
- Owner: (2021–present): Visemar RoPax Srl
- Operator: (2021–2026): Grandi Navi Veloci (GNV); (2026–present): Superfast Ferries / Attica Group
- Port of registry: Limassol, Cyprus
- Route: Venice – Igoumenitsa – Patras
- Builder: Cantiere Navale Visentini (Porto Viro, Italy)
- Yard number: 230
- Laid down: 2009
- Launched: 2021
- Completed: May 2021
- Acquired: May 2026 (Chartered by Attica Group)
- Maiden voyage: 2021
- In service: 8 June 2026 (with Superfast Ferries)
- Identification: IMO number: 9893369; Call sign: 5BSG5; MMSI number: 210170000
- Status: In service
- Notes: Chartered by Attica Group for a four-year period with a mandatory purchase obligation at completion.

General characteristics
- Class & type: Visentini-class RoPax
- Length: 203.28 m (666 ft 11 in)
- Beam: 25.61 m (84 ft 0 in)
- Installed power: MAK(12VM43C) 2 x 12,600 kW
- Propulsion: Twin screw
- Speed: 23.5 knots
- Capacity: 970 passengers (616 berths / 157 cabins); 2,564 lane metres of vehicle capacity
- Notes: Sister ship to Ciudad de Valencia

Superfast V is a RoPax ship belonging to the Italian shipping company Grandi Navi Veloci. The ship was built for GNV at Cantiere Navale Visentini and is part of the Visentini class. The ferry was delivered to GNV on 12 May 2021. In 2026 Attica Group chartered the vessel and renamed it to Superfast V.

== Characteristics ==
The ferry, a ro-pax vessel with a gross tonnage of approximately 32,000 tons and a length of 203 meters, is equipped with a latest-generation scrubber system, ensuring minimal atmospheric emissions, and has a cruising speed of 24 knots. It features comfortable onboard amenities in line with the company's standards, including a restaurant, self-service restaurant, bar, and 157 cabins, and can carry approximately 1,000 passengers.

In April 2021, a prototype sail for auxiliary propulsion called “Wing Sail Module” in 1/3 scale was installed at the San Marco shipyard in Trieste.

== Service ==
The ferry, the second of a series of two twin units, was launched on 28 March 2021 at the Visentini shipyard in Porto Viro with the name of GNV Bridge. A few hours after the launch, the ferry then set sail from the Polesine shipyard for the Adriatic to carry out the preparatory tests, but it ran aground in the Tartaro, the navigable canal where the shipyard is located, due to the shallow water, and remained blocked there until the night, when it managed to put out to sea thanks to the high tide. On 12 May 2021, upon completion of sea trials, the ferry was delivered on long-term charter to Grandi Navi Veloci, from which it was transferred on 31 May to Genoa and finally introduced in mid-June on the connections between the Ligurian port and Palermo, where it joined its fleet mates Excelsior and Forza.

On 6 July, as already announced on 5 May by the company, the ferry was transferred to the new connections between Barcelona, Palma de Mallorca and Ibiza, operated in tandem with the GNV Sealand, also chartered from Visemar di Navigazione. On 14 October, at the end of the first summer season, the ferry was moved again, this time to the connections between Valencia, Palma de Mallorca and Ibiza, where it replaced the GNV Sealand, which in turn was moved to the connections between Catalonia and Menorca and Mallorca. On 5 January 2022, while docked in Valencia, the ferry broke its moorings due to strong gusts of wind, ending up adrift against the container ship Seaspang Saigon, without however suffering any significant damage.

From March to the end of April 2025, the ferry was chartered to Caronte & Tourist and used on the Salerno - Messina routes, replacing the Cartour Delta during the latter's routine maintenance period. Following the replacement, the GNV Bridge returned to Spain, where it resumed service on its route, which continued to operate regularly until 3 December 2025, when, at the end of its charter to Grandi Navi Veloci, it was returned to Visemar di Navigazione, from which it was laid up in Naples, awaiting re-chartering. In March 2026, after a few months of stopover in the Neapolitan port, the ferry was chartered for five years, with obligation to purchase, to the Greek Superfast Ferries, from which it was renamed Superfast V on 7 May and transferred on 31 May to Patras, which on 11 June started connecting to Igoumenitsa, Corfu and Venice, replacing the Lefka Ori.
