= Blue Carrier 1 =

Roll on-roll off freight ferry built in 2000

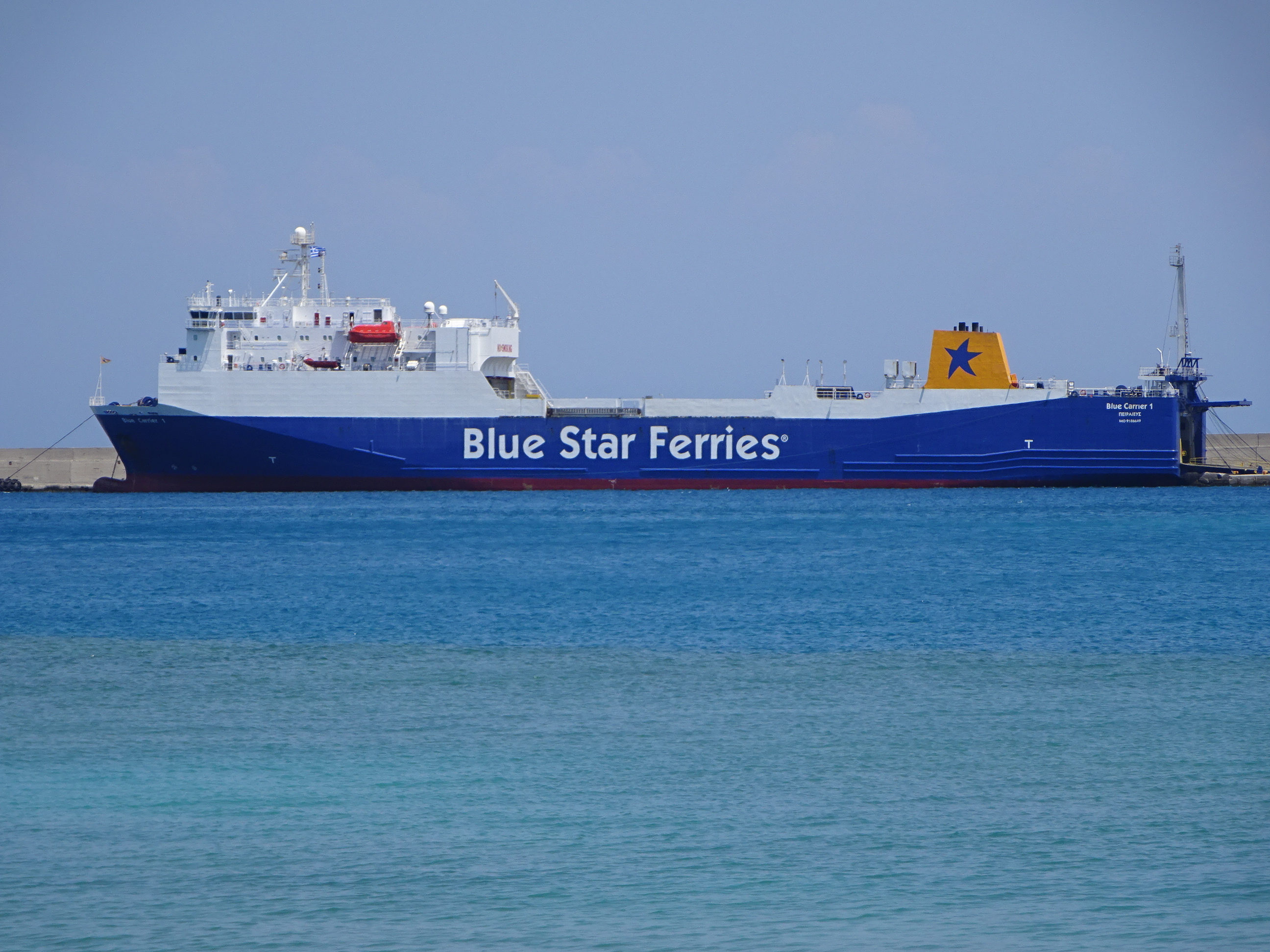
- Blue Carrier 1 at Rhodes in August 2025

History
- Name: Maersk Anglia (2000–2010); Anglia Seaways (2010–2019); Blue Carrier 1 (2019–present)
- Owner: Norfolkline (2000–2010); DFDS Seaways (2011–2019); Blue Star Ferries (2019–present)
- Operator: Norfolkline (2000-2010); DFDS Seaways (2010-2011); Seatruck Ferries (2011-2012); DFDS Seaways (2012); Seatruck Ferries; DFDS Seaways (2014); Blue Star Ferries (2019–present)
- Port of registry: 2000–2007: Scheveningen, Netherlands; 2007–2011: Vlaardingen, Netherlands; 2011–2019: København, Denmark; 2019 onwards: Piraeus, Greece
- Builder: Guangzhou Shipyard International, China
- Yard number: 7130011
- Laid down: 11 June 1999
- Completed: May 2000
- Maiden voyage: 8 July 2000
- Identification: IMO number: 9186649; MMSI number: 241671000; Call sign: SVCU5
- Status: In service

General characteristics
- Tonnage: 13,073 GT; 4,650 NT
- Displacement: 11,400 tons
- Length: 142.5 m (467 ft 6 in)
- Beam: 23.2 m (76 ft 1 in)
- Height: 38.4 m (126 ft 0 in) (keel to mast)
- Draft: 5.4 m (17 ft 9 in)
- Depth: 13.15 m (43 ft 2 in)
- Decks: 3
- Installed power: 2 × Sulzer 8ZAL40S (2 × 5,370 kW)
- Propulsion: Two shafts; controllable pitch propellers
- Speed: 18.5 knots (34.3 km/h; 21.3 mph)
- Capacity: 1,680 lane metres; 121 trailers; 12 Passengers

Blue Carrier 1 is a roll-on/roll-off ferry built in 2000 for Norfolkline and now operates in the Aegean Sea for Blue Star Ferries.

== History ==
=== Norfolk Line ===
The vessel was built at the Guangzhou Wenchong shipyard in China for Norfolkline, originally being named Maersk Anglia. The vessel first operated on the Scheveningen to Felixstowe route until 2006 when it was moved onto the Vlaardingen to Felixstowe route. In 2009 the vessel was moved to the Irish Sea and deployed on the Heysham to Dublin route.

=== DFDS Seaways ===
In July 2010 the vessel was sold to DFDS Seaways and renamed Anglia Seaways remaining on the Heysham to Dublin route.

In February 2011 the vessel was chartered to Seatruck Ferries and was deployed on the Heysham to Dublin route until 15 January 2012.

Then she was transferred over to the Immingham to Rotterdam route which she remained on until 30 April when the vessel was moved onto the Rosyth to Zeebrugge route.

In late May 2012 she was again chartered to Seatruck Ferries and operated on the Heysham to Warrenpoint route. In April 2014 the repainted ship operates for DFDS between Kiel and Kronstadt.

=== Attica Group ===
In May 2019 it was sold to the Attica Group. As of July 2019, she had been renamed Blue Carrier 1 and bears the Greek flag. It is expected to augment the ro-ro freight capacity of Attica Group in its Aegean sea routes.

== Description ==
Blue Carrier 1 is a roll on-roll off freight ferry 142.5 metres in length capable of carrying 121 trailers or 1,680 lane metres. It is powered by two Sulzer diesel engines which allow the vessel to reach a speed of 18 knots (21 mph).
