= Blue Star 1 =

Greek ferry

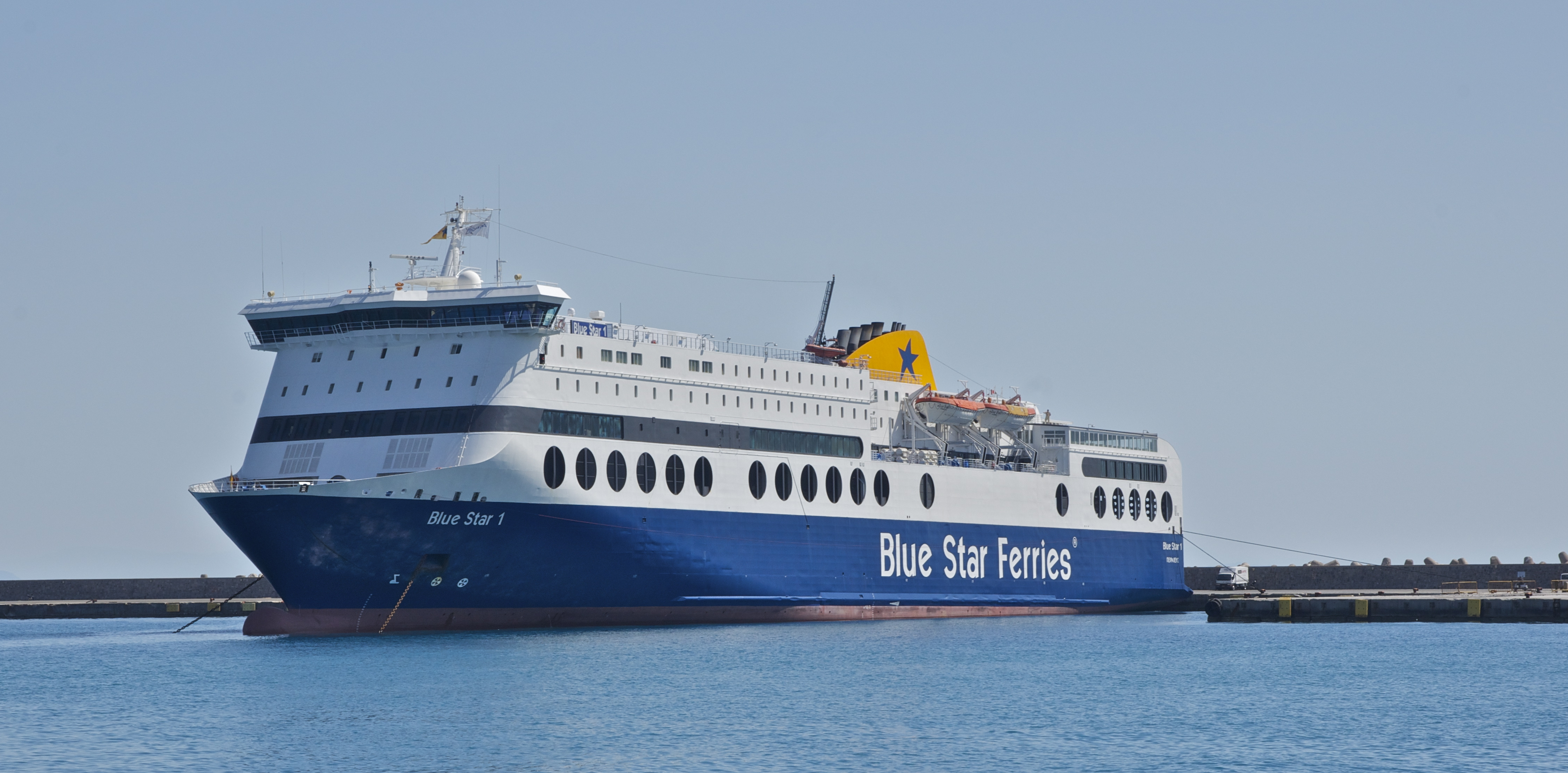
- Blue Star 1 in Rhodes.

History

Greece
- Name: Blue Star 1
- Owner: Attica Group (2000-present)
- Operator: Blue Star Ferries (2000–2021); Irish Ferries (2021–2023); Blue Star Ferries (2023–Present)
- Port of registry: Piraeus, Greece
- Ordered: 1998
- Builder: Van der Gissen de Noord, Krimpen aan den IJssel, Nederlands
- Launched: December 18, 1999
- Completed: 2000
- Maiden voyage: June 13, 2000
- In service: 2000
- Identification: Call sign: SWET; IMO number: 9197105; MMSI number: 239710000
- Status: In service

General characteristics
- Type: Ro-pax ferry
- Tonnage: 29,858 GT; 4,500 DWT
- Length: 176.09 m (578 ft)
- Beam: 25.70 m (84 ft)
- Height: 6.35 m (21 ft)
- Decks: 10
- Ramps: two for vehicles; one for passengers
- Propulsion: CODAD with four MAN B&W 8L58/64 diesel engines
- Speed: 27 knots
- Capacity: 1600 passengers; 640 vehicles

Blue Star 1 is a Greek ferry, which is owned by Blue Star Ferries. She is a motor Ro-Ro/Passenger ferryboat, built in 2000 by Van der Giessen de Noord shipward in Krimpen aan den IJssel, Netherlands. She is a sistership to Blue Star 2. She holds a total of 1600 passengers and 640 vehicles and has 430 beds in 161 cabins for passengers. She has four MAN B&W 8L58 / 64 diesel engines, with combined power of 44,480 kW and reaches speeds of up to 27 knots.

== History ==
=== Blue Star Ferries ===
==== 1998–2009: First years ====
The ship was ordered in 1998 by Strintzis Lines. The keel was laid on August 24, 1999 and was launched at December 18 of the same year. She was intended to be named Superferry Atlantic and serve Brindisi – Patras line. However, after Strintzis Lines' acquisition of 48% stake by Attica Enterprise and renaming to Blue Star Ferries, she got her current name. She was delivered on June 6, 2000 and on June 13, she was deployed by between Ancona – Brindisi – Patras, connecting Italy with Greece. By 2001, Brindisi was no longer included on her route, despite her excellent results here. Instead she was now stopping to Igoumenitsa from April to October. On 2002, due to the Superfast III and IV being sold, she had to replace them and the call in Igoumenitsa became regular. In July however, due to the delivery of Superfast XI, she was deployed between Piraeus – Patmos – Leros – Kos – Rhodes in Dodecanese, occasionally stopping in Syros, Mykonos and Amorgos. On March 4, 2005, she was replaced by her sistership, and returned to Adriatic, this time between Patras – Igoumenitsa – Bari. The last day of her on that route was on January 3, 2007.

Afterwards, she arrived at Neorion Shipyards, Syros island for extension on deck 9: Although the passenger capacity decreased, 15 new cabins were added and some crew cabins became passenger cabins. On January 26, she departed Piraeus towards Zeebrugge, where she arrived 3 days later. Once she arrived, she was deployed between Zeebrugge – Rosyth, in order to cover the space left by the Superfast X, which was sold earlier, until September 14, 2008. She was then returned to Greece and arrived in Patras on September 19. 5 days later she returned on the Patras – Igoumenitsa – Bari line.

==== 2010–2021 ====
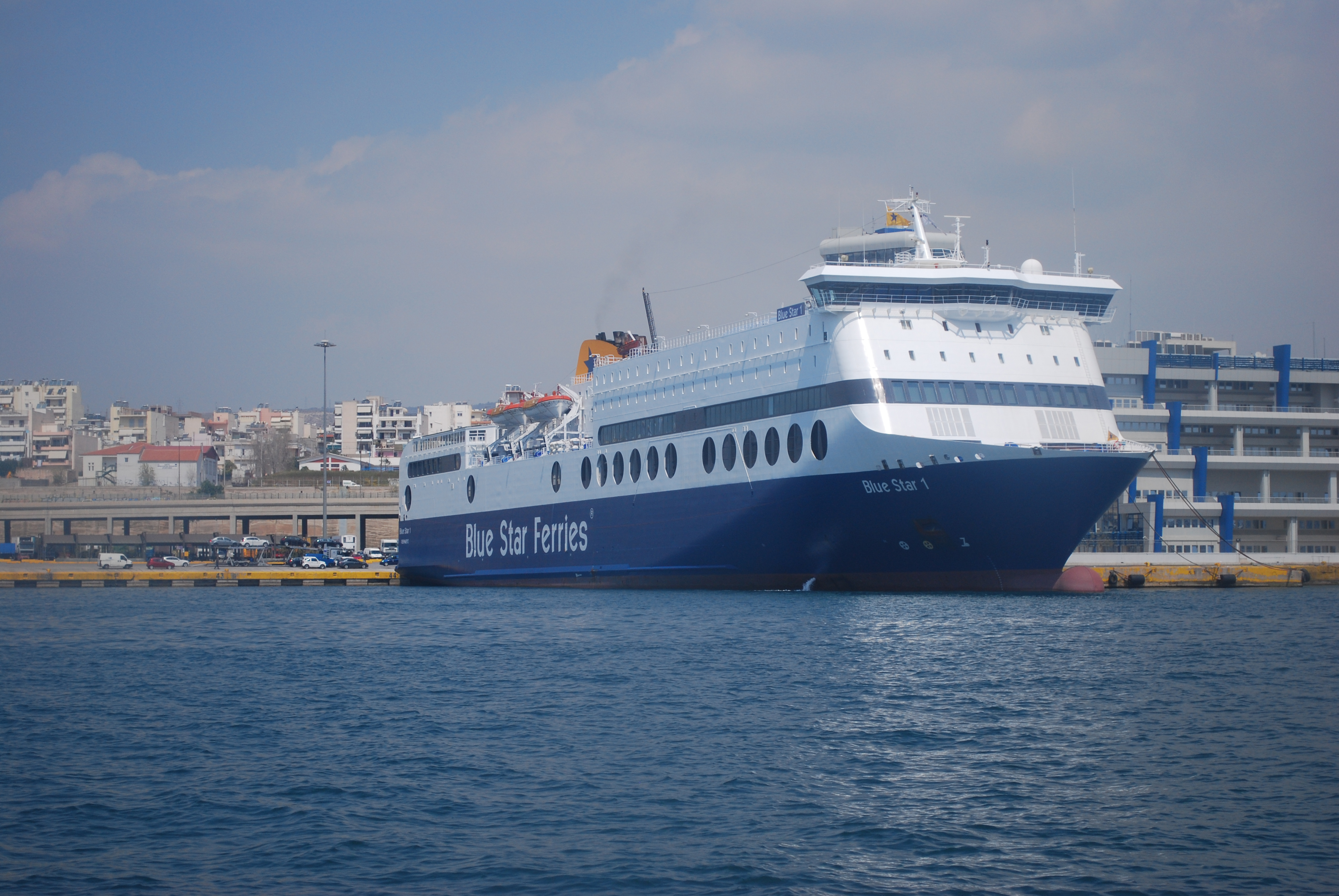
Blue Star 1 at Piraeus in 2010.

After 3 years on the Patras Igoumenitsa line, in 2011, she was deployed between Patras-Igoumenitsa-Ancona between February 10 and March 21. The following day she returned on the Patras-Igoumenitsa-Bari line for three more days until deploying between Piraeus – Syros – Santorini – Patmos – Leros – Kos – Rhodes, serving the Aegean Sea from the first time in 6 years. On February 1, 2012, she was deployed between Piraeus – Heraklion, under the ANEK-Attica joint venture, for one year, before returning to the Adriatic Sea on November 15, 2013.

She was then deployed between Patras – Igoumenitsa – Ancona, for one month before returning to the Aegean Sea on December 9. Since then, she operated the following lines:

Period	Route
January 9, 2014 – March 30, 2014	Piraeus – Chios – Mytilene
April 3, 2013 – October 26, 2014	Piraeus – Santorini – Kos – Rhodes
October 26, 2014 – January 29, 2015	Piraeus – Chios – Mytilene
January 29, 2015 – February 23, 2015	Piraeus – Heraklion
February 23, 2015 – May 26, 2015	Piraeus – Syros – Patmos – Leros – Kos – Rhodes
May 26, 2015 – 2016	Piraeus – Psara – Chios – Mytilene / Piraeus – Karlovasi – Chios – Mytilene – Lemnos – Kavala
2016–2018	Piraeus-Syros-Mykonos-Psara-Oinousses-Chios-Mytilene
2018–2021	Piraeus-Syros-Mykonos-Amorgos-Santorini-Samos-Patmos-Leros-Kalymnos-Kos-Symi-Rhodes

==== 2023 onwards: Return to Blue Star Ferries ====
After her Irish Ferries charter was completed she was returned to Blue Star Ferries and entered service on the Piraeus – Chania route, replacing the Blue Galaxy.

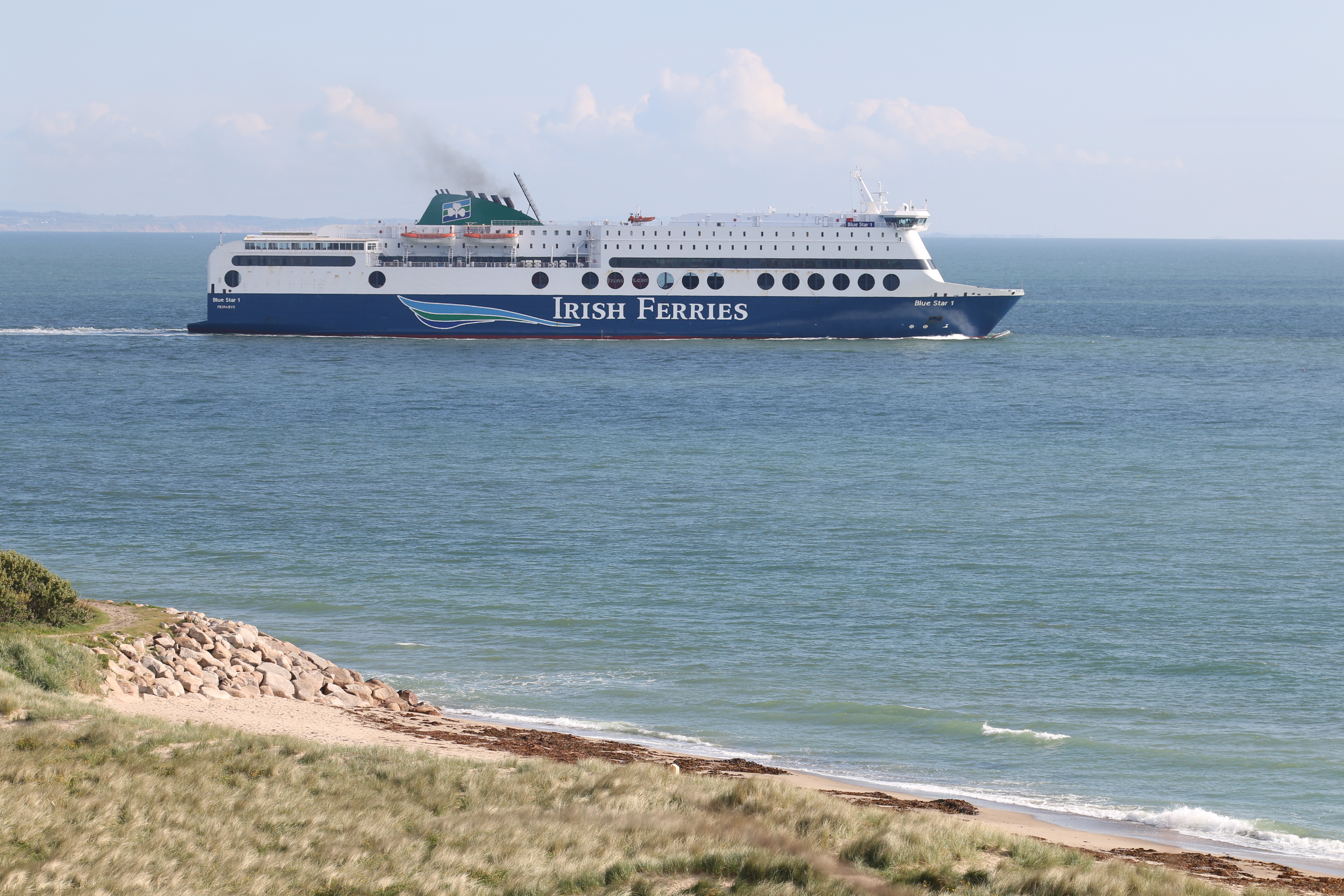
Blue Star 1 sailing for Irish Ferries.

=== Irish Ferries ===
In 2021, the Blue Star 1 was chartered by Irish Ferries for its Pembroke to Rosslare route in order to replace the Isle of Inishmore, which was moved to Irish Ferries' new route between Dover and Calais. The charter lasted for two years. She began service on 6 April 2021 and completed the charter on May 30, 2023. She was replaced by the Oscar Wilde, chartered by Irish Ferries from Tallink.

== Liveries ==
Original livery

The original consisted of a blue hull with the Blue Star Ferries logo in it, plus the "STRINTZIS LINES" text, referring to the company's old name. The decks were white with a black horizontical stripe in the middle deck. The funnel was orange with a blue star.

Current livery

The "STRINTZIS LINES" text was later removed from the livery.

"Superfast" livery

During her brief service in the North Sea, along with her formal Blue Star livery, she also had a "Joint service with" text along with the Superfast logo in a red background.

"ANEK, Superfast" livery

While briefly operating in the Piraeus-Heraklion line, along with the formal Blue Star livery, she also had the ANEK, Superfast logo on a white background.

"Irish Ferries" livery

In 2021 she was repainted in an Irish Ferries livery for her charter to the company, this involved the replacement of the Blue Star Ferries logo on the hull with an Irish Ferries logo as well as the repainting of the funnel to green with the Irish Ferries logo.

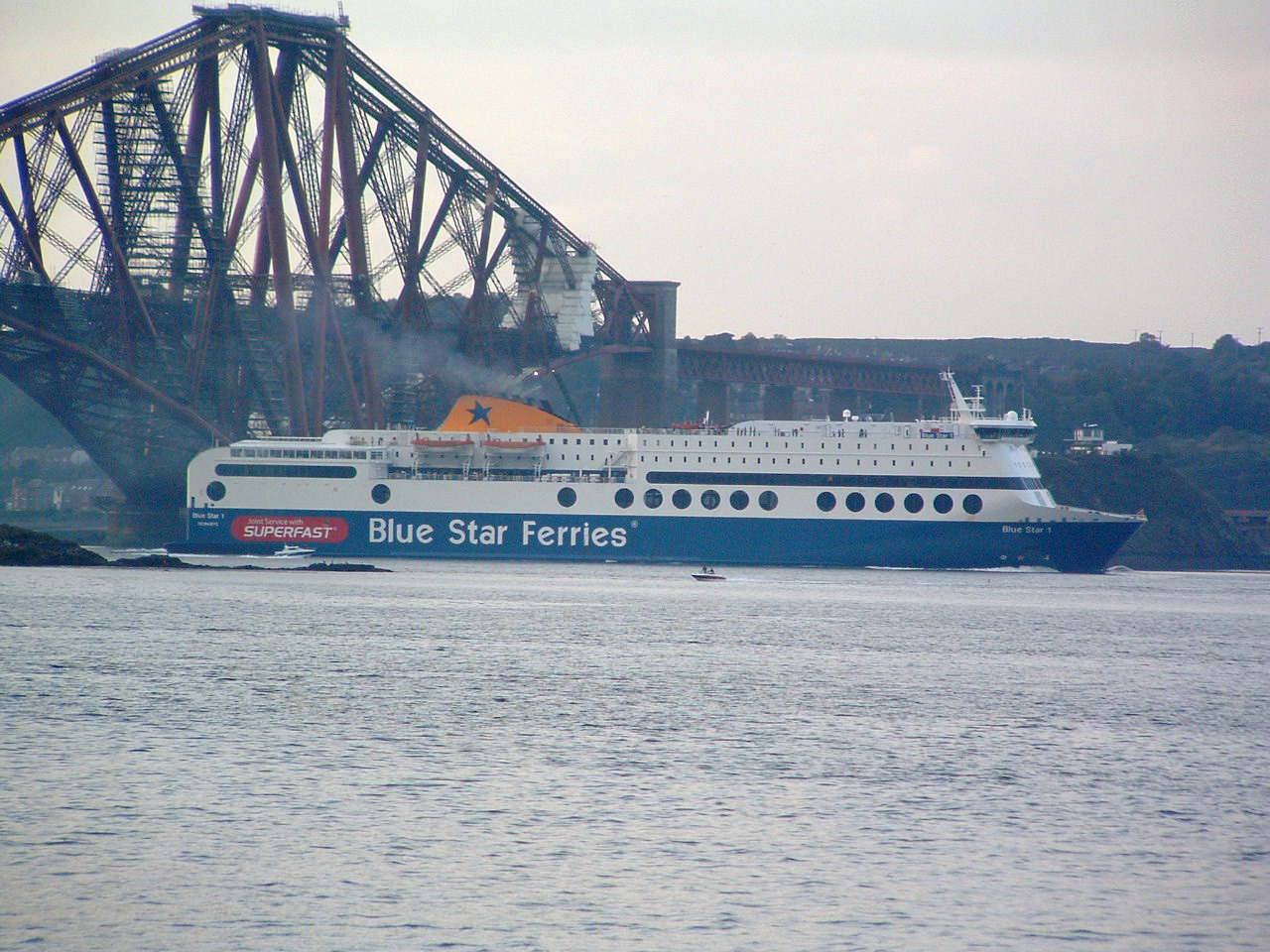
"Superfast" livery

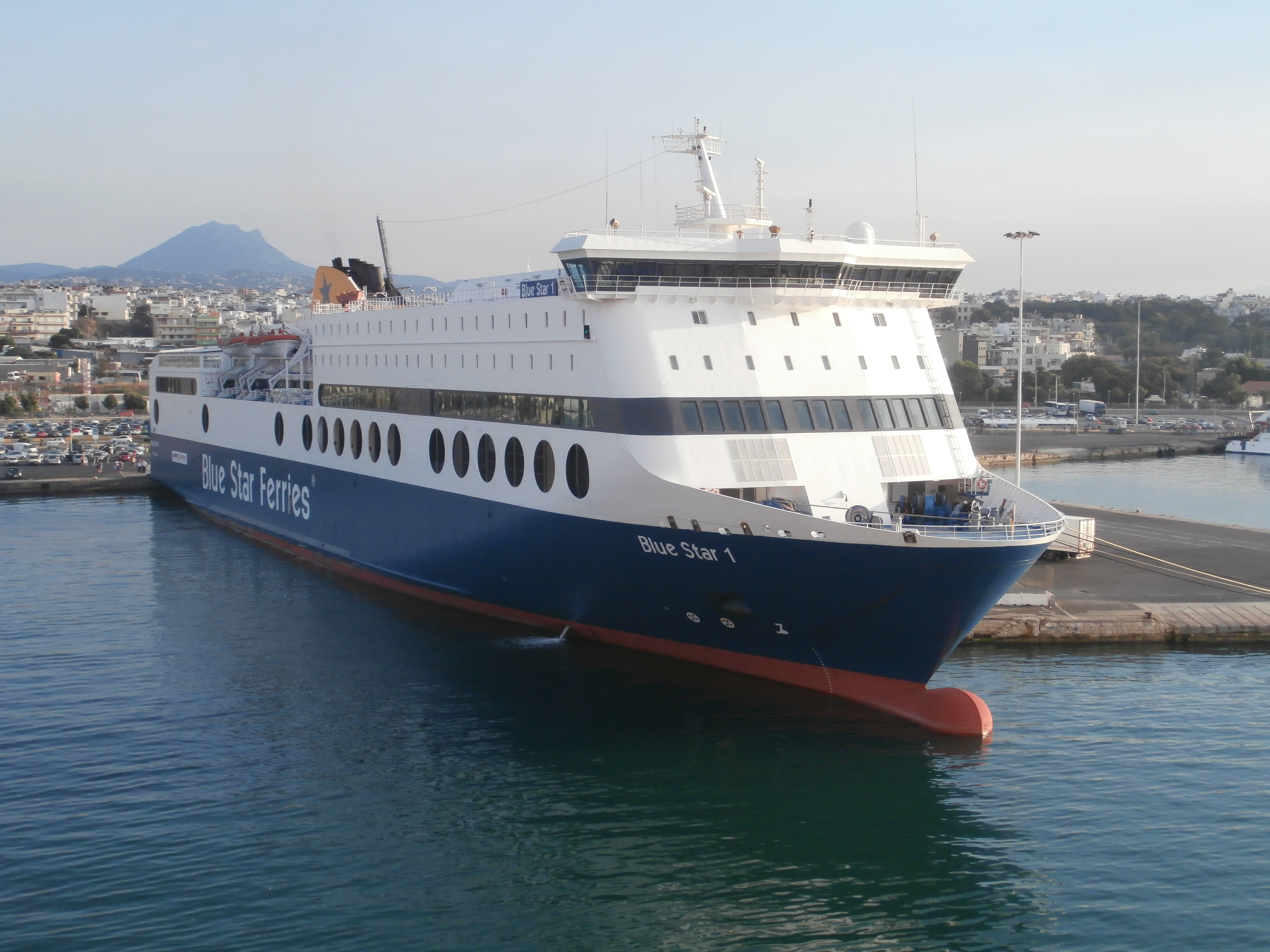
"ANEK, Superfast" livery

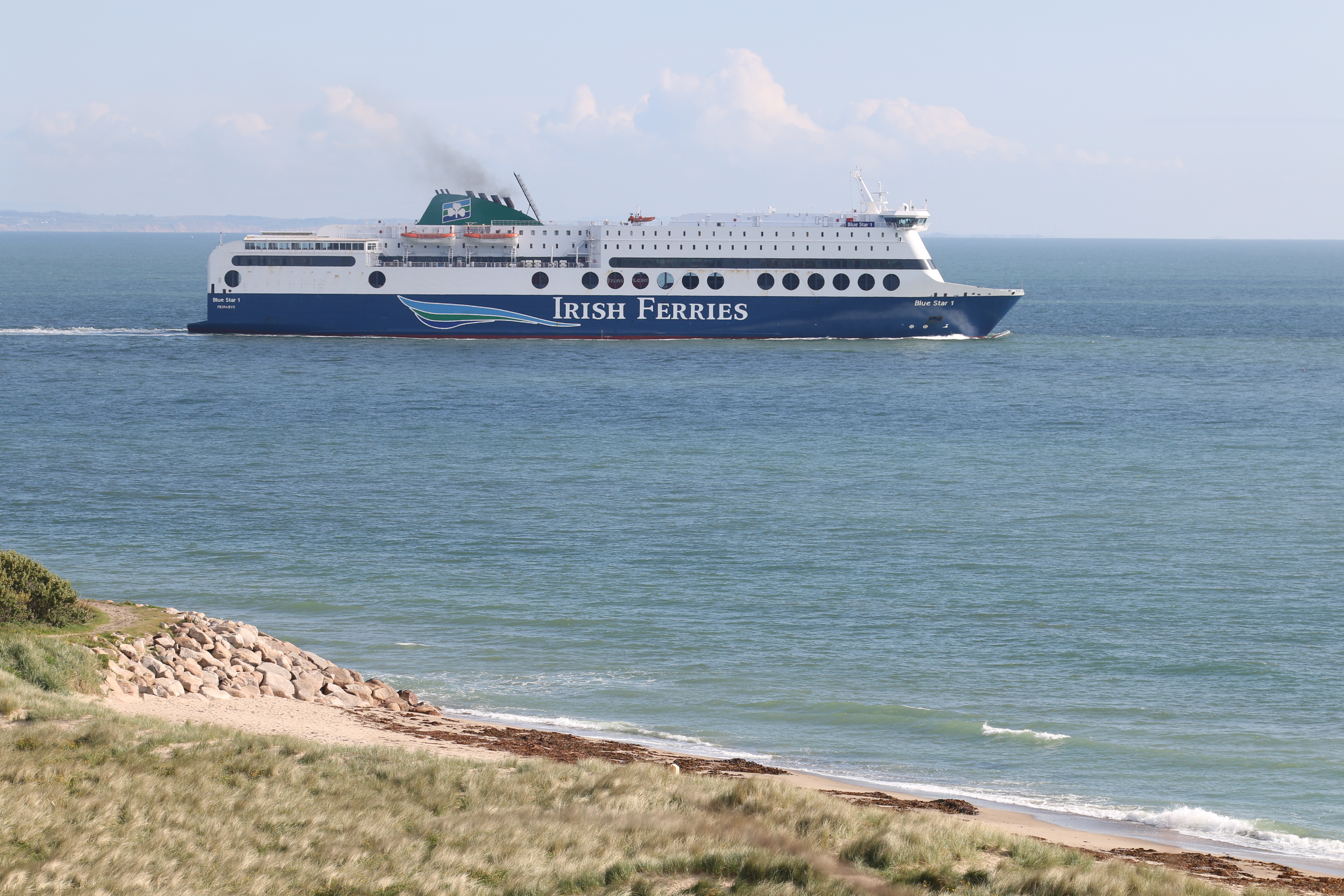
Irish Ferries livery (2021)
