= Blue Star 2 =

Greek ferry

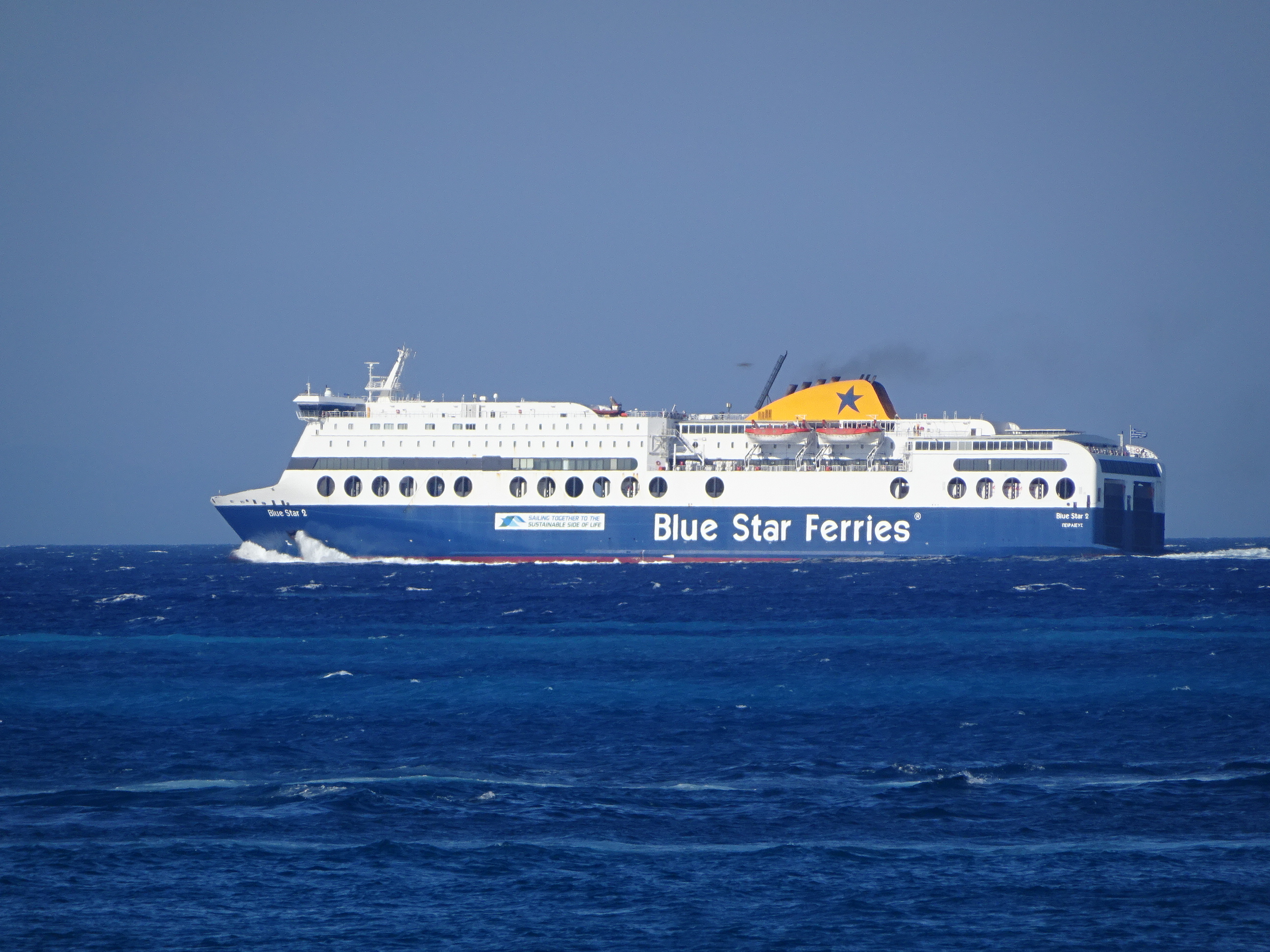
- Blue Star 2 departing from Rhodes.

History
- Name: 2000–present: Blue Star 2
- Owner: 2000–present: Attica Group / Blue Star Ferries
- Operator: 2000–present: Blue Star Ferries
- Port of registry: 2000–present: Syros / Piraeus, Greece
- Route: Piraeus – Rhodes – Kos – Leros – Patmos; Piraeus – Chios – Mytilene
- Ordered: 1998
- Builder: Van der Giessen-de Noord; Krimpen aan den IJssel, Netherlands
- Yard number: 978
- Laid down: 1999
- Launched: 2000
- Completed: June 2000
- Acquired: 2000
- Maiden voyage: July 2000
- In service: 2000
- Identification: IMO number: 9207584; Call sign: SVED; MMSI number: 239697000
- Status: in service
- Notes: Sister ship to Blue Star 1

General characteristics
- Class & type: Custom Van der Giessen Ro-Pax Ferry
- Tonnage: 29,415 GT; 4,165 DWT
- Length: 176.10 m (577 ft 9 in)
- Beam: 25.70 m (84 ft 4 in)
- Draught: 6.35 m (20 ft 10 in)
- Depth: 9.25 m (30 ft 4 in)
- Decks: 9
- Ramps: Bow and stern loading ramps
- Installed power: 4 × MAN B&W 8L58/64 main diesel engines (total 32,400 kW / 43,450 hp)
- Propulsion: 2 × controllable pitch propellers
- Speed: 28.0 knots (51.9 km/h; 32.2 mph) (max) / 25.5 knots (47.2 km/h; 29.3 mph) (service)
- Capacity: 1,854 passengers (176 cabins / 664 berths); 780 cars / 1,745 lane metres for freight
- Crew: 70–90

Blue Star 2 is a fast ferry operated by the Greek company Blue Star Ferries. Built between 1999 and 2000 by the Van der Giessen-de Noord shipyard in the Netherlands, it has been sailing since July 2000 on the Blue Star Ferries routes, initially between Greece and Italy and then in the Aegean Sea from 2003.

== History ==
=== Origins and construction ===
In the late 1990s, the ferry routes between Greece and Italy were largely dominated by Superfast Ferries and Minoan Lines, thanks to their efficient fleets of large, high-speed vessels. Since Superfast Ferries entered the market in 1995, speed had gradually become the standard on Adriatic routes. It was in this context that Strintzis Lines, a long-established operator on these routes, considered building similar vessels to remain competitive. Thus, an order for two sister ships was placed in 1998 with the Dutch shipyard Van der Giessen-de Noord. Despite being slightly smaller than their rivals, the future vessels were designed to achieve equivalent speeds of around 27 knots (50 km/h; 31 mph).

Designed to carry 1,600 passengers, the interior fittings incorporate the latest standards of comfort with several restaurants and bars, including one with a swimming pool, and around one hundred private cabins with bathrooms. The garage is designed to accommodate over 640 vehicles and around one hundred trailers, and consequently spans four and a half decks.

The second ship was launched on March 25, 2000. During its construction, Strintzis Lines was acquired by the Attica Group, the parent company of Superfast Ferries, and its name was changed to Blue Star Ferries. This event led to some modifications to the ship. Initially to be named Superferry Pacific, it was renamed Blue Star 2 and its hull was painted in the Blue Star Ferries colors. After finishing work, it was delivered to its owner on July 6, 2000.

=== Service ===
Blue Star 2 began its service on July 14, 2000, between Patras, Brindisi, and Ancona. It joined its sister ship, Blue Star 1 , which had entered service a month earlier, on this route. The stopover in Brindisi was discontinued in 2001, despite some success. In March 2003, the ship was transferred to the Blue Star Ferries routes in the Aegean Sea. Initially assigned to services with Crete from Piraeus, it was moved from 2005 onwards to serve the Dodecanese archipelago

== Facilities ==
Blue Star 2 has nine decks. Although the ship actually spans eleven decks, the non-existent decks 4 and 6 are still counted, and their absence does not create a discrepancy in the deck numbering. Passenger quarters occupy all of decks 7 and 8 and part of deck 9. The crew is housed on the forward section of deck 9. Decks 3 and 5 are entirely dedicated to the car deck, as is the forward section of deck 2.

=== Common areas ===
Blue Star 2 facilities are primarily located on deck 7. The ship features two lounge bars, one forward and one aft, an à la carte restaurant, a self-service restaurant, and a veranda on the aft deck 8. There are also a shop and an arcade. When it first entered service, the ship had an outdoor swimming pool on the aft deck 8, but this has since been removed.

=== Cabins ===
Blue Star 2 has 161 cabins located on decks 8 and 9 towards the front of the ship. With a capacity of two to four people, all are equipped with private bathrooms including shower, toilet and sink.

== Features ==
Blue Star 2 is 176.09 meters (577 ft 9 in) long and 25.70 meters (84 ft 4 in) wide, and assessed at 29,415 gross tonnage (GT). The ship has a passenger capacity of 1,600 and a 1,745-meter (5,725 ft)-long garage that can accommodate 640 vehicles on two and a half levels, as well as 100 trailers. The garage is accessible via two ramp doors located at the stern. Blue Star 2 is powered by four MAN-B&W 8L58/64 diesel engines, each producing 44,480 kilowatts (59,650 hp) of power, driving two propellers and propelling the vessel at a speed of 27 knots (50 km/h; 31 mph). The ship carries four large lifeboats, a rigid inflatable rescue boat, and several life rafts.

== Routes served ==
Upon its commissioning, Blue Star 2 was assigned to routes between Greece and Italy. Initially used between Patras, Brindisi, and Ancona, it ceased serving Brindisi in 2001. Transferred to the Aegean Sea in 2003, it first sailed to Crete between Piraeus and Chania before being redeployed to routes with the Cyclades and Dodecanese islands. Blue Star 2 operates the link between Piraeus and the islands of Syros, Amorgos, Patmos, Leros, Kos and Rhodes.
