= Blue Star Naxos =

Greek ferry

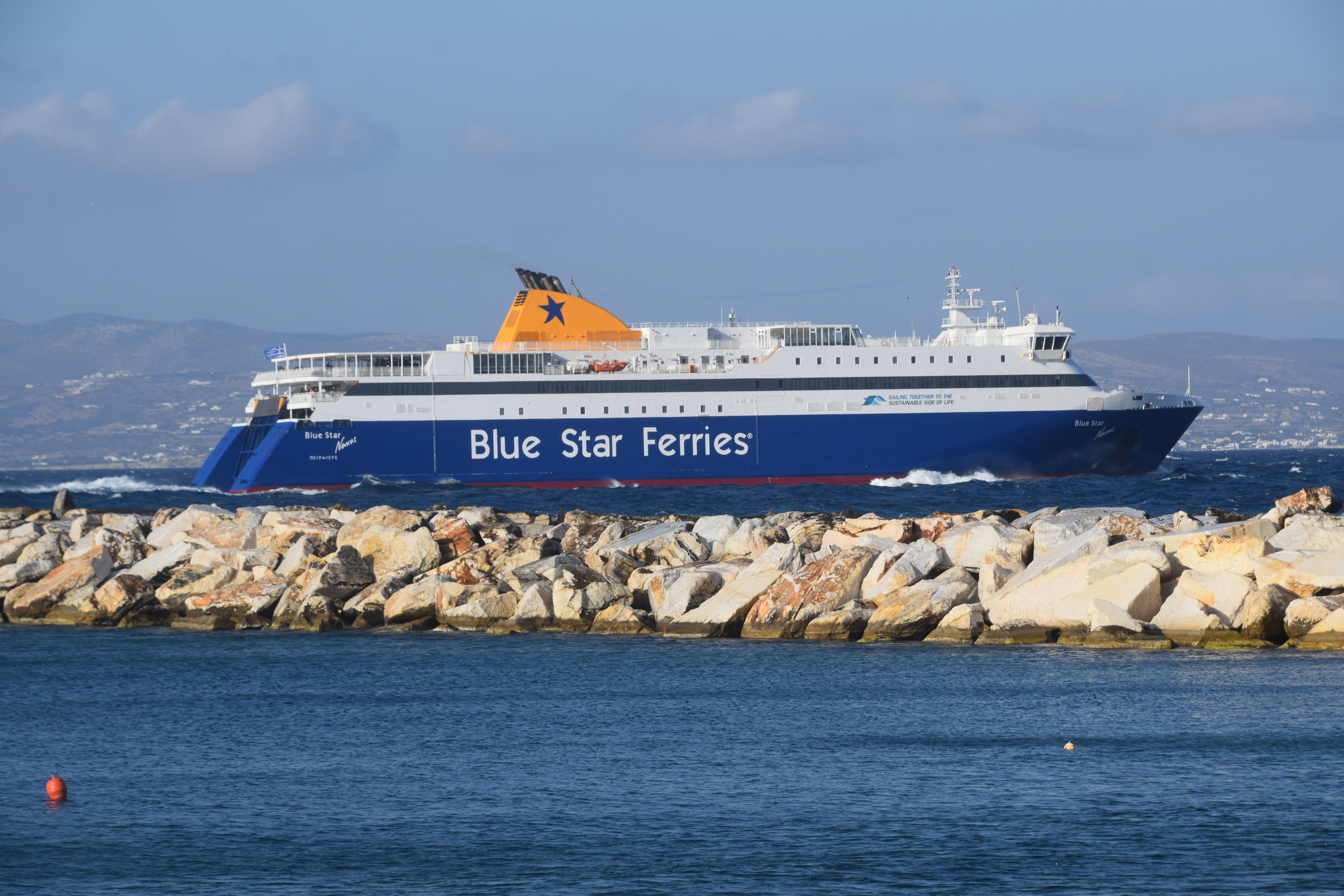
- Blue Star Naxos departing from Naxos.

History

Greece
- Name: Blue Star Naxos
- Namesake: Island of Naxos
- Owner: Strintzis Lines (2002); Attica Group (2002–present)
- Operator: Blue Star Ferries
- Port of registry: Piraeus, Greece
- Ordered: 2000
- Builder: Daewoo Shipbuilding & Marine Engineering (DSME), South Korea
- Yard number: 7508
- Laid down: 1 November 2001
- Launched: 28 February 2002
- Completed: 7 June 2002
- Identification: IMO number: 9241786; MMSI: 239923000; Call sign: SZUI
- Status: In service
- Notes: Sister ship to Blue Star Paros

General characteristics
- Type: Ro-pax ferry
- Tonnage: 10,438 GT
- Length: 124.20 m (407 ft 6 in)
- Beam: 18.90 m (62 ft 0 in)
- Draft: 5.10 m (16 ft 9 in)
- Installed power: 16,560 kW (22,210 hp)
- Propulsion: 4 × Wärtsilä NSD 9L32 diesel engines
- Speed: 25 knots (46 km/h; 29 mph) (max)
- Capacity: 1,474 passengers; 240 cars (360 lane meters)

Blue Star Naxos is a ferry belonging to the fleet of the Greek shipping company Blue Star Ferries. The ship was delivered on June 7, 2002, to what was then Strintzis Lines, which was renamed Blue Star Ferries shortly thereafter. The sister ship of Blue Star Naxos is Blue Star Paros.

== Technology ==
Blue Star Naxos was launched at a shipyard belonging to Daewoo Shipbuilding & Heavy Machinery Ltd. and is powered by four Wärtsilä NSD-9L32 diesel engines. These engines deliver 4,140 kilowatts (5,550 hp) at 750 rpm each, for a total output of 16,560 kilowatts (22,210 hp). This allows the ship to reach a speed of almost 24 knots.

The ship is loaded and unloaded via three stern ramps, two of which are for pedestrians only. The design is derived from Blue Star Ithaki, which was built two years earlier, but with a modified deck layout.

== Special features ==
This ship is the only Greek ship for which models are produced and sold at a scale of 1:1250.

== Service ==
Launched on 28 February 2002 at the Daewoo Shipbuilding & Marine Engineering Co. Ltd shipyard in Okpo with the name Blue Star Naxos and delivered on 7 June 2002 to the Greek Blue Star Ferries, she arrived on 24 June at Piraeus. On 30 June she was christened at Naxos. The following day she started service on the routes between Piraeus, Paros, Naxos, Santorini, and Amorgos, where she still operates.

== Accidents and Incidents ==
On 25 November 2019, during the morning hours, the Hellenic Coast Guard’s Joint Rescue Coordination Center (JRCC) was notified by the Master of Blue Star Naxos that the ship had run aground in shallow waters while departing from the port of Schinoussa. The grounding resulted in a hull breach and controlled water ingress into two empty reserve buoyancy tanks.

The ferry was operating a scheduled return itinerary from Katapola, Koufonisia, and Schinoussa to Heraklia, Naxos, Paros, and Piraeus, carrying 68 passengers and 64 crew members. No injuries were reported, and no marine pollution was detected.

As a precaution, the Naxos Port Authority placed a local patrol boat, private vessels, and a private diver on standby to assist, while a floating oil boom was preventively deployed around the vessel.

The ship was able to safely continue its transit under its own power and docked at the port of Naxos, where all passengers disembarked safely and were rerouted to their destinations by the shipowner. Following an extraordinary inspection by a Ship Inspection Branch official and the presentation of a class certificate from its classification society, the Naxos Port Authority cleared Blue Star Naxos to depart without cargo or passengers for a single voyage to Syros for drydocking and repairs at the local shipyard.

== Sister ships ==
- Blue Star Paros
- MV Fundy Rose (formerly Blue Star Ithaki )
