= Blue Star Ferries =

Greek ferry operator

- Founded: August 12, 1993; 33 years ago
- Headquarters: Kallithea, Athens, Greece
- Area served: Aegean Sea
- Services: Passenger transportation Freight transportation
- Parent: Attica Group
- Website: www.bluestarferries.com

Blue Star Maritime S.A., operating under the brand name Blue Star Ferries, is a Greece-based company founded in 1993 which provides ferry services between the Greek mainland and the Aegean Islands.

Blue Star Ferries is the biggest ferry company in Greece, serving more than 20 destinations. Its fleet is composed of 12 modern ferries whose course speeds range from 23 to 30 knots. Blue Star Ferries is a subsidiary of Attica Group along with Hellenic Seaways and Superfast Ferries.

== History ==
Blue Star Ferries was founded in 1965 as Strintzis Lines by the Strintzis family from Lixouri, Kefalonia. The company was rebranded as Blue Ferries in 2000 following Attica Enterprises' acquisition of a 48% stake in the company. Blue Star Ferries is a sister company of Superfast Ferries, as both are part of Attica Group and have had partnership in some routes, such as Rosyth–Zeebrugge and presently Piraeus–Heraklion.

In 2000, the company took delivery of two roll-on/roll-off (RO/RO) ferries built at the Dutch shipyard Van der Giessen de Noord.

In 2006, Blue Star Maritime S.A. purchased the Dodecanese ferry company DANE Sea Lines.

Blue Star Ferries ordered two ferry-type ships at Daewoo Shipyards in South Korea. The first ferry, named Blue Star Delos, was delivered in the first 10 days of October 2011, and the second, Blue Star Patmos, in July 2012. Blue Star Delos is currently on the route Piraeus–Paros–Naxos–Ios–Thira, and Blue Star Patmos on the route Piraeus–Chios–Mytilini (Lesvos).

== Current fleet ==
Blue Star Ferries currently operates a fleet of 10 vessels.

=== Conventional ferries ===
Ship	Flag	Built	Entered service	Gross tonnage	Length	Width	Passengers	Vehicles	Knots	Photo
Blue Star 1	(Greece)	2000	2000	29,415 GT	176.1 m	25.7 m	1,890	780	28	
Blue Star 2	(Greece)	2000	2000	29,415 GT	176.1 m	25.7 m	1,854	780	28	
Blue Star Paros	(Greece)	2002	2002	10,438 GT	124.2 m	18.9 m	1,474	240	24.4	
Blue Star Naxos	(Greece)	2002	2002	10,438 GT	124.2 m	18.9 m	1,474	240	24.4	
Diagoras	(Greece)	1990	2006	9,834 GT	141.5 m	23 m	1,462	274	21.1	
Blue Star Delos	(Greece)	2011	2011	17,550 GT	145.9 m	23.2 m	2,400	430	25.5	
Blue Star Patmos	(Greece)	2012	2012	17,550 GT	145.9 m	23.2 m	2,000	430	25.5	
Blue Star Myconos	(Greece)	2005	2020	14,717 GT	141 m	21 m	1,915	418	26.5	
Blue Star Chios	(Greece)	2007	2020	14,717 GT	141 m	21 m	1,782	418	27.0	

=== RO/RO cargo ships ===
Ship	Flag	Built	Entered service	Gross tonnage	Length	Width	Passengers	Vehicles	Knots	Photo
Blue Carrier 1	(Greece)	2000	2019	13,073 GT	142.5 m	23.5 m	18	1,680 l.m.	17.5	
Blue Carrier 2	(Greece)	1997	2024	23,986 GT	162.5 m	25.6 m	12	2,307 l.m.	17.5	

== Former fleet ==
=== As Strinzis Lines ===
- Kephalinia (1965–1993), scrapped as Zachara in 2005
- Ionion (1972–1978), sank in Gramvousa, Crete in 1992
- Ionian Star (1976–1990), scrapped as Tian Kun in 2001
- Ionian Glory (1981–1989), scrapped in 2012 at Alexandria, Egypt
- Eptanisos (1984–2000), scrapped as Pollux 1 at Gadani Beach, Pakistan in 2004
- Ionian Victory (1984–1986), scrapped as Jin Hu in 2004
- Delos (1986–1997), scrapped in 2011
- Ionian Sun (1986–2001), scrapped as Merdif in 2004 at Alang, India
- Ionian Island (1987–2000), scrapped as Merdif 1 in 2010 at Alang, India
- Ionian Galaxy (1987–2000), scrapped as Merdif 2 in 2011 at Alang, India
- Ionian Fantasy (1988–1991): while serving as Ionian Sea (1991–1993), caught fire while laid up under the name Leros at Elefsina, Greece; scrapped at Aliağa, Turkey in 2001
- Ionian Harmony (1989–1990), scrapped as Caly in 2013 at Alang, India
- Ezio (1986–2007), scrapped as Al Masam in Alang India 2009
- Superferry (1991–2001), scrapped as Mahabba in Chittagong Ship Breaking Yard in 2021
- Superferry II (1993–2000), serving as SuperStar for Seajets since 2021
- Ionian Star (1994–1999), serving as Denia Ciutat Creativa for Balearia since 2016
- Kefalonia (1995–2000), serving as Kefalonia for Levante Ferries since 2018
- Ionian Bridge (1996–2000), scrapped as Duba in 2021 at Alang, India
- Sea Jet 1 (1998–2000), serving as Super Jet for Seajets since 2004
- Ionian Victory (1998–2000), scrapped as Ionian Sky in 2020 at Aliağa, Turkey
- Sea Jet 2 (1999–2000), serving as Seajet 2 for Seajets since 2006
- Superferry Hellas (1999–2000), serving as Lefka Ori for Superfast Ferries since 2024

=== As Blue Ferries and Blue Star Ferries ===
- Blue Bridge (2000–2004), scrapped as Duba in 2021 at Alang, India
- Blue Galaxy (2000–2001), scrapped as Merdif 2 in 2011 at Alang, India
- Blue Island (2000–2001), scrapped as Merdif 1 in 2010 at Alang, India
- Blue Sky (2000–2004), scrapped as Ionian Sky in 2020 at Aliağa, Turkey
- Kefalonia (2000–2004), serving as Kefalonia for Levante Ferries since 2018
- Sea Jet 1 (2000–2003), serving as Super Jet for Seajets since 2004
- Sea Jet 2 (2000–2006), serving as Seajet 2 for Seajets since 2006
- Blue Aegean (2001–2002), scrapped as Mahabba in 2021 at Colombo, Sri Lanka
- Superferry II (2000–2011), serving as SuperStar for Seajets since 2021
- Blue Star Ithaki (2000–2014), serving as Fundy Rose for Bay Ferries since 2014
- Blue Horizon (2000–2023), serving as Lefka Ori for Superfast Ferries since 2024
- Blue Galaxy (2015–2024), serving as Kissamos for ANEK Lines since 2024

== Routes ==
=== Piraeus–Cyclades ===
- Piraeus–Paros–Naxos–Ios–Santorini (Blue Star Delos)
- Piraeus–Paros–Naxos–Irakleia–Schoinousa–Koufonisia–Amorgos (Blue Star Naxos)
- Piraeus–Syros–Tinos–Mykonos (Blue Star Paros)

=== Piraeus–Dodecanese ===
- Piraeus–Syros–Amorgos–Patmos–Leros–Kos–Rhodes (Blue Star 2)
- Piraeus–Astypalaia–Fournoi–Ikaria–Patmos–Leipsoi–Leros–Kalymnos–Kos–Nisyros–Tilos–Symi–Rhodes–Kasos–Karpathos–Kastellorizo (Blue Star Patmos)
- Piraeus–Santorini–Anafi–Heraklion–Kasos–Karpathos–Diafani–Chalki–Rhodes-Sitia (Blue Star Chios)

=== Piraeus–Northeast Aegean Sea ===
- Piraeus–Chios/Mesta–Mytilene (Blue Star 1)
- Piraeus–Syros–Patmos–Ikaria–Fournoi Korseon–Samos–Chios–Mytilene–Limnos–Kavala (Blue Star Myconos)

== Media ==
One of Blue Star Ferries' boats took the role of Princess Myrto on the Greek TV show Θα Σε Δω Στο Πλοίο (literally translated: I'll See You on the Ferry) broadcast by Alpha TV, a Greek channel, from 2000 to 2002. The majority of the filming for this series was on the boat itself except for on-location filming of the characters on holiday or on leave. This is still being broadcast in certain Greek-speaking countries, including Cyprus.

== Controversy ==
On September 5, 2023, a 36 year old passenger of Blue Horizon, owned by Blue Star Ferries, on his effort to catch the ship on time, fell overboard and drowned at the port of Piraeus. The company initially denied any responsibility claiming that the man slipped, but video footage that was released later showed clearly that he was pushed off the ship's hatch by crew members. At that time the ship was departing with her propellers full ahead and the man drowned due to heavy turbulence. The video showed that the ship continued her course and the crew neither offered help nor reported "man overboard" as should. After the video was released on social media the ship, who had continued her voyage to Crete, was ordered to return to the port where the captain and the responsible crew members were arrested by the port police.
