= Lefka Ori (ship) =

Greek ferry

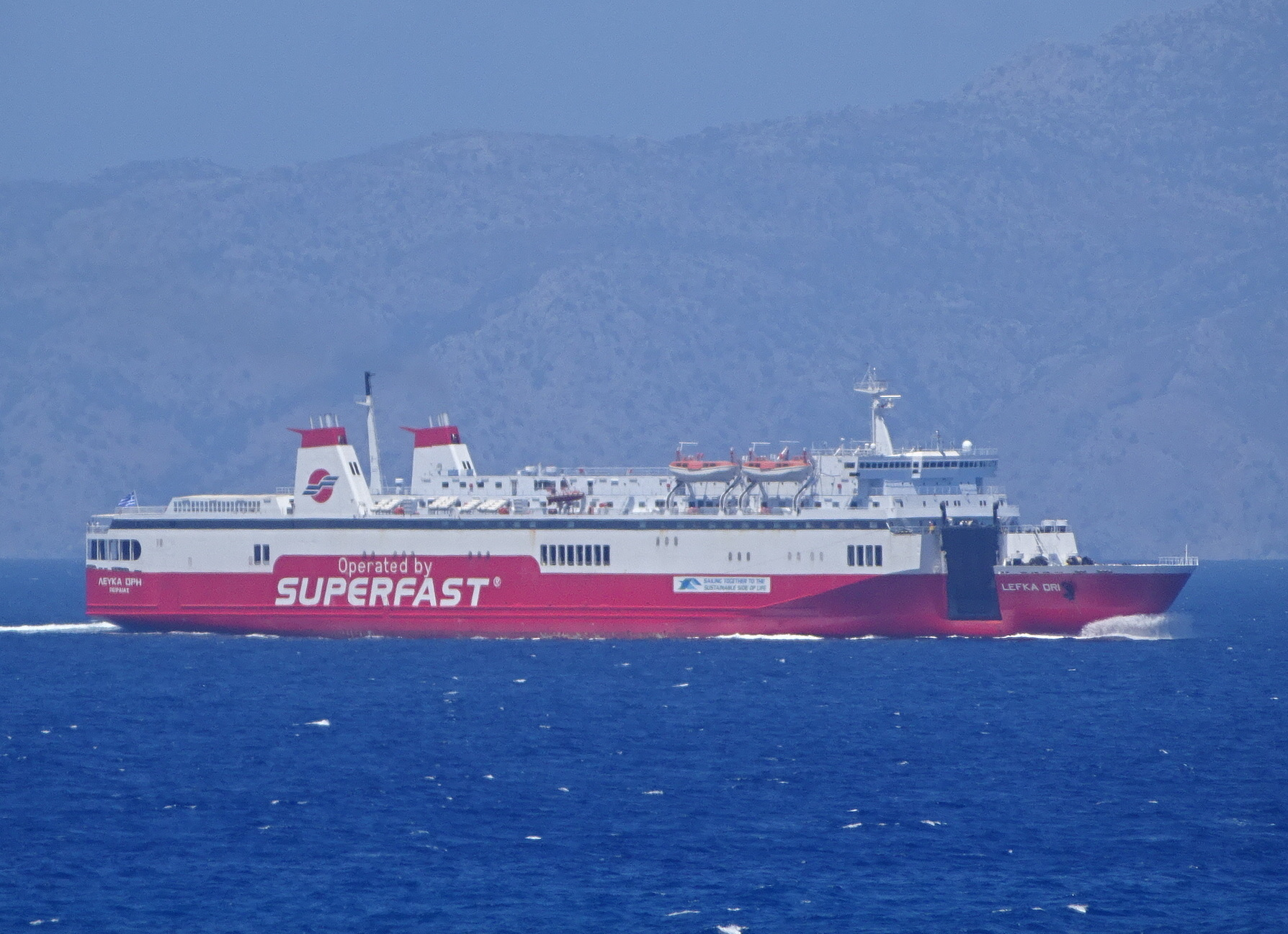
- Lefka Ori sailing in the Aegean Sea.

History

Antigua and Barbuda
- Name: Varuna (1987–1998); Superferry Hellas (1998–2000); Blue Horizon (2000–2023); Lefka Ori (2023-2026); Daleela Express (2026-Present)
- Owner: Higashi Nihon Ferry (1987–1998); Strintzis Lines (1998–2000); Attica Group (2000–2026); Scandi Shipping Agency (2026-present)
- Operator: Higashi Nihon Ferry (1987–1998); Strintzis Lines (1998–2000); Blue Star Ferries (2000–2023); ANEK Lines (2023–2024); Superfast Ferries (2024–2026); Aletehad Line (2026-present)
- Port of registry: St. Johns, Antigua and Barbuda
- Builder: Mitsubishi Heavy Industries, Japan
- Yard number: 899
- Launched: 1987
- Completed: 1987
- Identification: IMO number: 8616336; MMSI: 305097300; Call sign: V2B2097
- Status: In service

General characteristics
- Type: Ro-pax ferry
- Tonnage: 27,230 GT
- Length: 187.1 m (614 ft)
- Beam: 27.0 m (88.6 ft)
- Draft: 6.6 m (22 ft)
- Propulsion: 2 × MAN-Mitsubishi 8L58/64 diesel engines
- Speed: 21 knots (service); 24 knots (max)
- Capacity: 1,488 passengers; 780 cars (1,863 lane meters)

Daleela Express is a ferry belonging to Scandi Shipping Agency, operating for its partner Aletehad Line. Built between 1986 and 1987 at the Mitsubishi Heavy Industries shipyard in Shimonoseki for the Japanese company Highashi Nihon Ferry, it was originally named Varuna (ばるな, Baruna). Entering service in July 1987 on the routes between Hokkaido and Ōarai, on the Pacific coast of Honshu, it was at the time one of the largest ferries in Japan. Sold in 1998 to the Greek company Strintzis Lines, it entered service in January 1999 between Greece and Italy under the name Superferry Hellas. In 2000, following the acquisition of Strintzis Lines by the Attica Group and its renaming to Blue Star Ferries, the ship was renamed Blue Horizon. Since 2009, it has primarily operated on Aegean routes to the Cyclades and the Dodecanese, and more recently to Crete. Due to the involvement of its crew in a homicide case that sparked outrage throughout Greece, the ship was renamed Lefka Ori and initially transferred at the end of 2023 to ANEK Lines, now a subsidiary of the Attica Group, before finally joining the Superfast Ferries fleet in February 2024.

== History ==
=== Origins and construction ===
In the late 1980s, the Japanese company Higashi Nihon Ferry decided to renew its fleet operating on the Ōarai - Muroran route. To remain competitive with Taiheiyō Ferry, which had announced the construction of particularly large vessels, an order for two similar units was placed with the manufacturer Mitsubishi Heavy Industries.

Designed similarly to the future Taiheiyō Ferry vessel, the Higashi Nihon Ferry ship shares very similar characteristics, measuring approximately 190 meters in length and 27 meters in width. Beyond these comparable dimensions, the new vessel, like its predecessor, features a large, two-level garage spanning four decks, capable of accommodating around 150 trailers and approximately 100 private vehicles. Designed to carry 680 passengers, the passenger facilities will extend over two decks and offer standard amenities, including a restaurant, first-class suites and private cabins, and public baths.

Built in Shimonoseki, the ship, named Varuna, was laid down on December 2, 1986. Launched on March 31, 1987, it was then delivered to Higashi Nihon Ferry on July 10.

=== Service ===
==== Higashi Nihon Ferry (1987–1998) ====
The Varuna entered service on July 20, 1987, between Ōarai and Muroran, replacing the first Varuna. In July 1989, the arrival of its sister ship, the Victory, led to its relocation between Sendai and Tomakomai.

In 1998, the Varuna and its sister ship were replaced on their usual routes by the new Varuna and the Hercules. The Varuna was then sold to the Greek company Strintzis Lines.

==== Strintzis Lines/Blue Star Ferries (Attica) (since 1998) ====
Upon delivery to its new owner, the ship was renamed Superferry Hellas. In 1998, it departed Japan for Greece. Arriving in September at the Perama shipyards, it underwent some modifications, including the refurbishment of the interior. New facilities and cabins were added, and a section was constructed at the stern, allowing for the addition of a bar/lido with a swimming pool. The work continued until January 1999.

The ship entered service on January 6, 1999, on Strintzis Lines' Adriatic Sea routes between Greece and Italy. In 2000, following the acquisition of Strintzis Lines by the Attica Group, the company initially became Blue Ferries and then Blue Star Ferries. At that time, the Superferry Hellas was renamed Blue Horizon.

From January 2004, the ship was assigned to the Piraeus - Crete route. On March 20, a fire broke out on board but was quickly brought under control and caused no injuries.

The following year, in 2005, service to Crete was discontinued and the Blue Horizon returned to sailing in the Adriatic Sea. It returned to the Aegean Sea in 2009 during its transfer between Piraeus and the Cyclades, and then again to Crete in 2010.

Due to the crisis affecting the Greek shipping market in the early 2010s, the vessel was withdrawn from service on April 28, 2011, and initially laid up in Drapetsona and then Syros. It finally returned to service in 2013, first in the Adriatic Sea and then in the Aegean Sea between Piraeus, Crete, the Cyclades, and the Dodecanese.

On May 23, 2018, as the Blue Horizon was leaving the port of Piraeus, people on board reported to the crew that a 25-year-old passenger had fallen overboard. The captain immediately ordered the ship back to port while five patrol boats from the Greek coast guard and navy began searching for the man, who was never found.

During 2020, the ship was laid up due to the health crisis linked to the Covid-19 pandemic. After a long period of disarmament, it resumed service to Crete on July 1st.

Returning to service under its new name between Piraeus and Crete in November, its career with ANEK Lines was short-lived, however, as in February 2024, the ship was transferred to Superfast Ferries, another subsidiary of the group. After being repainted in its new operator's colors, including a red hull, the Lefka Ori was added to Superfast's service between Greece and Italy on February 27.

On 13 July 2025, approximately one year after its return to the Adriatic, the ferry, replaced by the Superfast IV, was again moved to inter-island connections in the Aegean Sea, this time between Piraeus, Vathy, Patmos, Leros, Kos and Rhodes. Nevertheless, at the end of the season, the ferry resumed service on the connections between Greece and Italy, which operated until 10 June 2026, when it was replaced by the newly chartered Superfast V and, after a short period of lay-up, employed until 15 September on the connections between Piraeus, Samos and the Dodecanese, being finally sold at the end of this assignment for 8.3 million euros to the Egyptian Scandi Shipping Agency.

===== Aletehad Lines (since 2026) =====
After being finally sold at the end of this assignment for 8.3 million euros to the Egyptian Scandi Shipping Agency, from which it was taken over on 24 September in Limassol and after having called three days before in Rhodes to unload semi-trailers, its name was changed to Daleela Express and being entrusted to the partner Aletehad Line, which after a series of works in the shipyards of Suez transferred her on 25 October to Jeddah and deployed her on the links to Suakin.

== Facilities ==
The Lefka Ori spans 11 decks. Although the ship actually only has 9, two decks, which are not garage decks, are still counted. Passenger quarters occupy all of decks 7 and 8, while the crew is housed on deck 9. Decks 3 and 5 contain the garages.

=== Common areas ===
During the ship's Japanese period, passengers had access to a restaurant-theater and a snack bar on deck 8, two public baths (called sentō ), and a tea room, a games room, and a shop on deck 7.

Since the renovations carried out by Strintzis Lines, the ship is equipped on deck 7 with a lounge bar, a self-service restaurant, a pub, an à la carte restaurant, and a shop. There is also an outdoor bar with a swimming pool on the aft deck 8.

=== Cabins ===
On board the Varuna, the cabins were located on decks 7 and 8. The ship was equipped in 1st class with 24 special double cabins in Western style, 48 four-berth cabins in Western style, five to four in Japanese style, 168 2nd class berths distributed in 14 twelve-berth cabins and six dormitories for a total of 232 berths.

Today, the ship has 164 private cabins on decks 7 and 8 for a total of 530 berths. All cabins have private bathrooms including shower, toilet and sink.

== Features ==
The Lefka Ori is 187.13 meters long and 27 meters wide. Its original tonnage was 16,722 GT (which is not entirely accurate, as the tonnage of Japanese car ferries is defined using different criteria), before being increased to 27,230 GT during its 1999 refit. In its initial configuration, it could carry 680 passengers and 116 vehicles in a spacious garage that could also accommodate 147 trailers, accessible via two side ramp doors, one at the bow and the other at the stern on the starboard side, and two axial doors at the bow and stern. Following the 1999 refit, the ship can carry 1,510 passengers and 870 vehicles. Its garage access points remained unchanged, although a dedicated pedestrian ramp was added at the stern and the forward axial door was closed. The Lefka Ori is powered by two MAN-Mitsubishi 8L58/64 diesel engines, producing 21,880 kW of power and driving two propellers, propelling the vessel at a speed of 24 knots. It is also equipped with a bow thruster and a roll stabilizer. At the time, safety equipment consisted primarily of life rafts and a rigid inflatable rescue boat. Since 1999, the ship has been equipped with four large, enclosed lifeboats.

== Route served ==
From 1987 to 1998, the Varuna sailed for the Higashi Nihon Ferry company on the routes between the Pacific coast of Japan and the island of Hokkaidō on the Ōarai - Muroran route from 1987 to 1989 and then Sendai - Tomakomai until 1998.

From 1999, the ship served the Strintzis Lines and then Blue Star Ferries routes between Greece and Italy, initially on Patras - Igoumenitsa - Corfu - Ancona / Venice and then Patras - Igoumenitsa - Bari from 2003. From 2004, it periodically served the Aegean Sea routes to Crete between Piraeus and Chania, as well as the Cyclades and Dodecanese archipelagos to the islands of Santorini, Kos and Rhodes.

In the late 2010s, the Blue Horizon was transferred to Blue Star Ferries' seasonal route to Crete between Piraeus and Heraklion. It will retain this assignment until February 2024 before being redeployed between Greece and Italy on the Patras - Igoumenitsa - Venice route.

== Accidents and Incidents ==
On 24 August 2020, during the morning hours, a severe steam leak occurred in the engine room of the vessel (operating under its former name, Blue Horizon) during scheduled maintenance work while it was moored at the port of Heraklion. The ferry had arrived earlier from Piraeus, safely disembarking all 420 passengers before the incident took place. Four engine room crew members—aged 30, 34, 27, and 45—sustained severe injuries from the high-pressure steam release and were urgently transported by an EKAB ambulance to the University General Hospital of Heraklion.

The 30-year-old crew member, who suffered the most critical injuries, was immediately intubated and admitted to the Intensive Care Unit (ICU), where he ultimately succumbed to his wounds later that afternoon. Following the tragedy, the Central Port Authority of Heraklion launched a preliminary investigation, while Attica Group—the parent company of Blue Star Ferries—confirmed that the accident stemmed from a steam line failure during routine onboard maintenance. Under ministerial orders, specialized technical teams from the Ship Inspection Branch and the Hellenic Bureau for Marine Casualties Investigation (HBMCI) deployed to the vessel to fully determine the exact technical causes and safety conditions surrounding the fatal incident.

On September 5, 2023, as the ferry was preparing to leave Piraeus for Crete, a late passenger crossed the port's perimeter fence and attempted to board via the still-open rear ramp. He was then violently pushed back by a crew member as the ship veered away from the dock and plunged into the harbor waters before the eyes of the passengers. The 36-year-old man, Antonis Karyotis, drowned, and the incident sparked outrage across the country, leading to a general strike by Greek maritime unions and the resignation of the Minister of Maritime Affairs, Miltiadis Varvitsiotis, and the CEO of the Attica Group, Spiros Paschali. Five crew members, including the captain, were charged with manslaughter and complicity in murder.This event would also have a direct impact on the ship a few months later. Following the acquisition of the historic company ANEK Lines by the Attica Group, management decided to transfer the Blue Horizon to its new subsidiary to dissociate it from the incident. Thus, the ship, laid up in Perama since the incident, was repainted in ANEK Lines colors and renamed Lefka Ori. Returning to service under its new name between Piraeus and Crete in November, its career with ANEK Lines was short-lived, however, as in February 2024, the ship was transferred to Superfast Ferries, another subsidiary of the group. After being repainted in its new operator's colors, including a red hull, the Lefka Ori was added to Superfast's service between Greece and Italy on February 27.
