= Barun =

- Barun, India
- Barun, Iran
- Barun Valley, Nepal

== See also ==
- Varun (disambiguation)
