= Varun, Iran =

Varun, Iran (Persian: وارعون or ورون) may refer to:

- Varun, Isfahan, a village in Kuhpayeh District, Isfahan County, Isfahan Province
- Varun, Yazd, a village in Aqda District, Ardakan County, Yazd Province
