= Varuna Waragoda =

Sri Lankan cricketer (born 1971)

Varuna Seneviratne Kithsirimewan Waragoda (born February 18, 1971) in Colombo, is a Sri Lankan former first class cricketer who played in more than 100 matches.

A left-handed batsman, Waragoda made 6,141 First Class runs at an average of 48.73 during his career. He also scored 14 First Class centuries. Waragoda represented the Burgher Recreation Club, Colombo Cricket Club, Galle Cricket Club and Tamil Union Cricket and Athletic Club.

He attended D.S. Senanayake College.
