= Attica Group =

Greek ferry operator

Attica Holdings S.A.
- Trade name: Attica Group
- Native name: Attica Ανώνυμος Εταιρία Συμμετοχών
- Type: Public
- Traded as: Athex: ATTICA
- ISIN: GRS144003001
- Industry: Shipping; Transport
- Founded: 27 October 1918; 107 years ago as Attica Flour Mills S.A.
- Founders: Savvas Kamperoglou; Alexander Panagopoulos
- Headquarters: Kallithea, Athens, Greece
- Key people: Kyriakos D. Magiras (Chairman); Panagogiannopoulos Nikolaos (President); Spiridon Paschalis (CEO)
- Revenue: €290.40 million (2020)
- Operating income: €40.46 million (2020)
- Net income: €(53.63) million (2020)
- Total assets: €905.48 million (2020)
- Total equity: €378.35 million (2020)
- Owner: Strix Holdings LP (86.704%)
- Number of employees: 1,412 (2020)
- Subsidiaries: ANEK Lines; Attica Blue Hospitality; Blue Star Ferries; Hellenic Seaways; Superfast Ferries
- Website: attica-group.com

Attica Holdings S.A. is an operator of international ferry services in Europe. Attica Group's operations include its subsidiaries Superfast Ferries, which began in 1995 with the launch of its first ships, Superfast I and Superfast II, and Blue Star Ferries, which operates ferries in the Aegean Sea to the Greek islands. In June 2018, Attica Group increased its share in Hellenic Seaways to 98.83%. Hellenic Seaways is a subsidiary of the Attica Group following the acquisition of a minority interest of 1.17% in July 2019. In December 2023, it acquired ANEK Lines, rendering the operator number two in the volume of passengers commuted in Europe.

== History ==
The company was established in 1918 in Piraeus, Greece, under the name "General Company of Commerce and Industry of Greece". In the beginning, it specialised in producing and trading flour under the name of "Attica Flour Mills SA". In 1922, the company changed hands and was renamed Attica Enterprises S.A. This was later revised to Attica Enterprises Holding S.A. before being shortened to Attica Group.

1924
The Attica Group was listed on the Athens Stock Exchange, marking a key step in its growth and public presence.

Throughout the mid-20th century, Attica Group remained primarily engaged in commercial trading and non-shipping activities, without major operations in ferry transport.

1993
A new management team, chaired by Pericles S. Panagopulos, created the shipping subsidiary Attica Maritime S.A., later renamed Superfast Ferries Maritime S.A. The first two Superfast car-passenger ferries, Superfast I and Superfast II, were ordered from Schichau Seebeckwerft AG in Bremen, Germany.

1995
April and June: The two ordered car-passenger ferries, Superfast I and Superfast II, were delivered and employed in the Patras–Ancona–Patras service. The two ferries cut the crossing time between Patras and Ancona by up to 40%.

1996
July: Two new Superfast car-passenger ferries, Superfast III and Superfast IV, were ordered at Kvaerner Masa-Yards in Turku, Finland.

1998
April: Superfast III and Superfast IV were delivered and deployed on the Patras–Ancona–Patras route, while Superfast I and Superfast II launched a new route linking Patras and Igoumenitsa with Bari in southern Italy.

2006
February: Attica sells its 12.33% stake in Hellenic Seaways acquired a year earlier.

March: Blue Star Ferries' passenger-only catamaran SeaJet 2 is sold. The sale of the vessel is part of the company's policy to focus on the operation of fast, modern conventional car-passenger vessels.

April: Superfast VII, Superfast VIII, and Superfast IX, serving on the Rostock, Germany – Hanko, Finland route in the Baltic Sea are sold to AS Tallink Grupp. The sold vessels will retain their names and continue sailing under the Superfast livery until the end of 2007 at the latest, following an agreement with AS Tallink Grupp.

Attica Group maintains its presence in the Baltic Sea with the operation of its two RoRo vessels, which trade between Rostock, Germany, and Uusikaupunki, Finland.

July: Attica's subsidiary, Blue Star Maritime S.A., acquires the total assets of DANE Sea Line for a total of €19.9 million. The assets included the car-passenger ferry Diagoras, which is deployed to the Dodecanese Islands' routes in August.

August: Attica enters into an agreement to sell to Veolia Transport its ice-class vessel Superfast X trading between Scotland and Belgium for a total cash consideration of €112 million. The delivery of Superfast X and final payment is to take place at the beginning of 2007.

November: Attica enters into an agreement with Fret Cetam of France for the chartering of RoRo Nordia until October 2008. RoRo Nordia was deployed on the Uusikaupunki, Finland – Rostock, Germany route together with RoRo Marin. As of the beginning of 2007, RoRo Marin is to be redeployed from the Baltic Sea to serve the needs of the Group in the Greece–Italy routes in the Adriatic Sea and in the domestic market.

Blue Star Ferries is voted "Passenger Line of the Year" at Lloyd's List Greek Shipping Awards.

December: Attica Group announces the deployment of Blue Star 1 of its subsidiary Blue Star Ferries to the Scotland–Belgium service as of the end of January 2007. Blue Star 1 is to replace Superfast X, which was sold earlier in the year, and is to be delivered to her new owners in February 2007.

2007
February: Attica Group increases its stake in Minoan Lines to 22.25%.

June: Attica sells its total participation in Minoan Lines S.A.

August: Attica proceeded in the assignment of new offices and new responsibilities to its board members. On behalf of its subsidiaries Superfast Ferries and Blue Star Ferries, Attica Group donated the amount of €150,000 to the Special Relief Fund for the benefit of the victims of the recent fires in Greece.

September: Attica Group announces the purchase of two RoPax ships, built in 1998 and 1999.

Attica Group, pursuant to Law 3556/2007, Decision 1/434/03.07.2007 and Circular nr. 33 of the Hellenic Capital Market Commission, announced that Marfin Investment Group Holdings S.A., which is closely associated to the vice-chairman of the Board of Directors Andreas Vgenopoulos, bought shares of the company as follows:

a) on 20 February 2008 bought 19,295 shares with total net value of €106,292.29 b) on 21 February 2008 bought 10,518 shares with total net value of €57,938.79

2008
September: Zeebrugge–Rosyth route discontinued on 13 September. The service will be restarted in spring 2009 by Norfolkline.

On 12 March 2009, Superfast XII began service on the newly established Piraeus–Heraklion route. In December, Brittany Ferries acquired Superfast V from the Attica Group for €81.50 million. Following its delivery in February 2010, the ship was renamed MV Cap Finistère.

In June 2016, Attica Group and BMCE Bank established Africa Morocco Link (AML), a joint venture that would operate scheduled ferry services from Morocco to Europe. Attica Group held a 49% minority stake in the new company, with the remainder held by a consortium of Moroccan investors led by BMCE Bank.

In May 2018, Attica Group secured a 50.3% controlling interest in Hellenic Seaways, increasing its stake in the company to 98.83% by June. The overall transaction amounted to €142.9 million.

In September 2022, Attica Group acquired ANEK Lines, expanding the company's network of routes while maintaining ANEK Lines as its fourth cruise line subsidiary.

In April 2024, Attica Group sold its 49% share in Africa Morocco Link to Stena Line.

== Fleet ==
The Attica Group fleet includes 31 ships (plus 2 on charter and 1 laid up) operated by four subsidiaries.

=== ANEK Lines ===
- Asterion II
- Elyros
- Kissamos
- Prevelis (Laid up)
- El. Venizelos (On bareboat charter for Algerie Ferries)
- Kydon (On bareboat charter for Ferries del Caribe)

=== Blue Star Ferries ===
- Blue Star 1
- Blue Star 2
- Blue Star Delos
- Blue Star Chios
- Blue Star Myconos
- Blue Star Naxos
- Blue Star Paros
- Blue Star Patmos
- Blue Carrier 1
- Blue Carrier 2
- Diagoras

=== Hellenic Seaways ===
- Artemis
- Nissos Rodos
- Nissos Samos
- Hellenic Highspeed
- Highspeed 3
- AERO 1 Highspeed
- AERO 2 Highspeed
- AERO 3 Highspeed
- AERO 4 Highspeed
- AERO 5 Highspeed

=== Superfast Ferries ===
- Superfast I
- Superfast II
- Superfast III
- Superfast IV
- Superfast V
- Superfast XI
- Ariadne

== Controversies ==
On 18 January 2023, Lighthouse Reports, in collaboration with SRF, ARD, Al Jazeera, Il Domani and Solomon, published a report claiming illegal pushbacks of asylum seekers from Italy to Greece using Superfast ferries. If those asylum seekers arrived at the ports of Venice, Ancona, Bari, and Brindisi, they were denied the opportunity to seek asylum and were pushed back using ferries operated by Attica Group, specifically Superfast Ferries. Immigrants were put into shower rooms and metal boxes with caged roofs, sometimes being handcuffed to metal shelves.

On 6 September 2023, a 36-year-old passenger on board the Blue Horizon, operated by Blue Star Ferries, died when crew members pushed him from the ship's hatch. The passenger was en route to his birthplace, Crete, but had experienced a delay in boarding the ferry. Despite his intentions to board, ferry workers denied him access and pushed him off the loading ramp, causing him to fall into the sea, where he drowned. The incident was captured on video by other Blue Horizon ferry passengers.

In response to the video evidence shared on social media, authorities took action. Four crew members of the Blue Horizon ferry, including the deck officer and the master, were arrested. A Greek prosecutor filed criminal charges just one day after the event, targeting the ferry captain and three of his crew members in connection with the 36-year-old man's death. One crew member faced charges of possible intentional homicide, while the other two were charged with complicity. The captain was charged with serious breaches of shipping regulations.

== See also ==
- List of Greek companies
