= Varun Sharma (cricketer) =

Indian cricketer (born 1987)

Personal information
- Born: 4 November 1987 (age 39); Himachal Pradesh, India
- Source: Cricinfo, 1 November 2015

Varun Sharma (born 4 November 1987) is an Indian first-class cricketer who plays for Himachal Pradesh.
