= Fundy Rose =

Canadian passenger ship

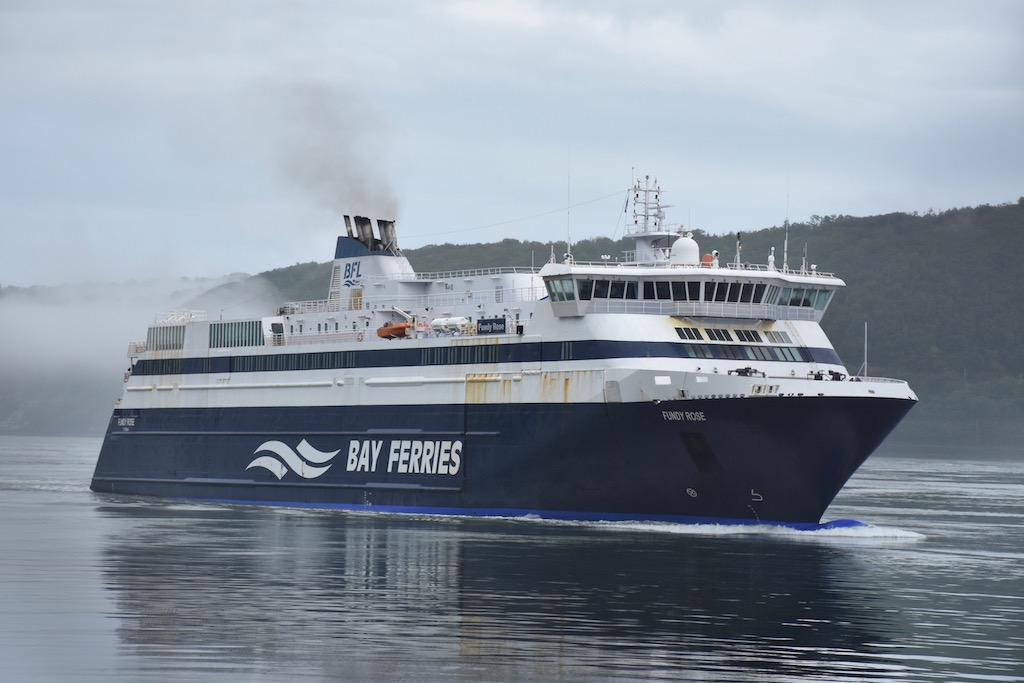
- Fundy Rose coming in to dock at the Digby, Nova Scotia ferry terminal

History
- Name: 2015 onwards: Fundy Rose; 2014–2015: Canada 2014; 2000–2014: Blue Star Ithaki
- Owner: 2014 onwards: Government of Canada; 2000–2014: Blue Star Ferries (Attica Group)
- Operator: 2015 onwards: Bay Ferries; 2000–2014: Blue Star Ferries
- Port of registry: 2014 onwards: Ottawa Canada; 2000–2014: Athens Greece
- Route: 2015 onwards: Saint John, New Brunswick-Digby, Nova Scotia; 2000–2014: Piraeus-Greek islands
- Builder: Daewoo Shipbuilding, Okpo, South Korea
- Yard number: 7504
- Laid down: 15 July 1999
- Launched: 24 November 1999
- Completed: 12 May 2000
- Acquired: 31 March 2000
- Identification: IMO number: 9203916; Call sign: CFK5493; MMSI number: 316013210
- Status: In service

General characteristics
- Class & type: RO/RO Passenger Vessel
- Displacement: 10,193 GT
- Length: 123.8 m (406 ft)
- Beam: 18.9 m (62 ft)
- Draft: 4.9 m (16 ft)
- Propulsion: 4x Wärtsilä diesel engines; 2x propellers
- Speed: 24 knots (44 km/h; 28 mph) (service)
- Capacity: 1,317 passengers

Fundy Rose is a Roll-on/roll-off passenger ship owned by the Government of Canada, which entered service with Bay Ferries in 2015 between Saint John, New Brunswick, and Digby, Nova Scotia, replacing the Princess of Acadia. The vessel was formerly owned by Attica Group based in Athens, Greece, and was operated under the name Blue Star Ithaki by their subsidiary company Blue Star Ferries under the Greek flag.

== History ==
=== Greek service ===
Blue Star Ithaki was ordered by Greek shipowner Strintzis Lines from Daewoo Shipbuilding & Marine Engineering. Her keel was laid on 15 July 1999 at Daewoo's Okpo shipyard, she was launched on 24 November, and was handed over to her owners on 31 March 2000, though construction work continued until May. While she was under construction, Attica Group acquired Strintzis Lines and launched the Blue Star Ferries brand, under which name Blue Star Ithaki entered service. She was homeported in Piraeus, Greece, and operated on routes from Piraeus to the islands of Syros, Tinos and Mykonos.

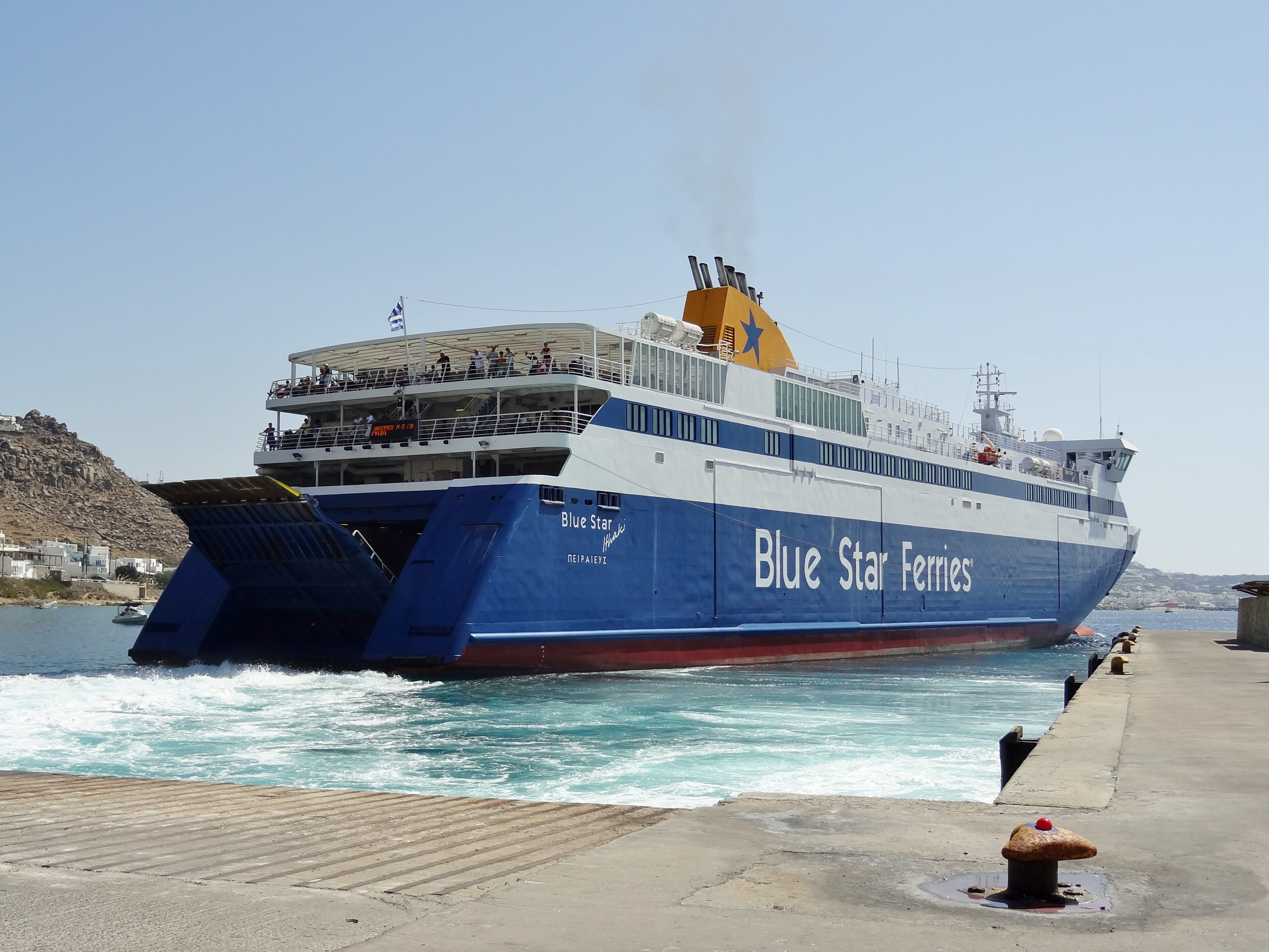
Blue Star Ithaki departing from the port of Mykonos in 2013.

=== Canadian service ===
In October 2014, Blue Star Ithaki was sold to the Canadian government. The ship has replaced Bay Ferries' former ferry, the former Canadian Pacific ship Princess of Acadia. Blue Star Ithaki began her last journey on the Piraeus-Syros-Tinos-Mykonos route on 25 October 2014. The vessel's new name Fundy Rose was announced in May 2015. Fundy Rose was unveiled to the public in both Saint John and Digby in mid-July 2015, and entered service by the end of the month.

The new name was taken from The Bay of Fundy, where she operates, and from Rose Fortune, a woman born into slavery in the U.S. She escaped with her family arriving in Annapolis Royal (an historic village close to Digby) in the 1780s as a ten-year-old girl.

== Design ==
Fundy Rose measures 10,193 GT and has been configured during her career to have a deadweight tonnage of between 1,410 and 1,857 DWT. She is 123.8 metres (406 ft) long, with a beam of 18.9 metres (62 ft) and a draft of 4.9 metres (16 ft). Her main propulsion power comes from four Wärtsilä NSD 9L32 engines, which generate 4,140 kilowatts (5,550 hp) each and drive two propeller that give her a service speed of 24 knots (28 mph) and a maximum speed of 25 knots (29 mph). In Greek service she had a passenger capacity of about 1,500; as configured for Canadian service she can carry 1,317 passengers.
