= Kriti II =

Former Greek ropax ferry

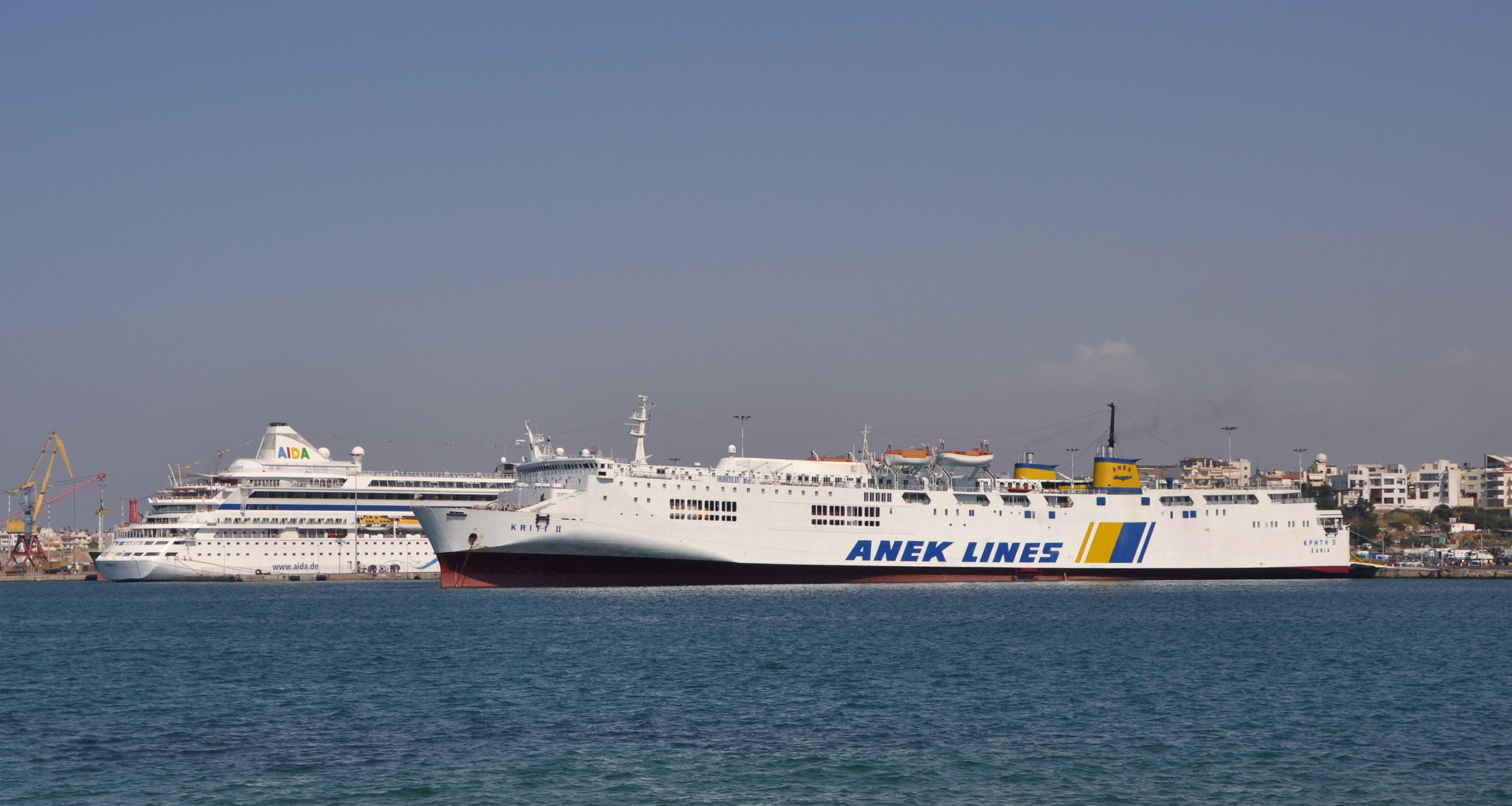
- Kriti II in Herakleion

History
- Name: (1979–1996): New Yukari; (1996–2025): Kriti II
- Owner: (1979–1995): Shin-Nipponkai Ferry; (1995–2023): ANEK Lines; (2023–2025): Attica Group
- Operator: (1979–1995): Shin-Nipponkai Ferry; (1996–2024): ANEK Lines
- Port of registry: (1979–1995): Otaru, Japan; (1996–2025): Chania, Greece
- Route: Piraeus – Heraklion
- Builder: Koyo Dockyard; Mihara, Japan
- Yard number: 830
- Launched: 30 March 1979
- Completed: 1 July 1979
- Acquired: 1995 (by ANEK Lines)
- Maiden voyage: 1979
- In service: 1979 (Japan) / 1997 (Greece)
- Out of service: November 2024
- Identification: IMO number: 7814058; Call sign: SZQW; MMSI number: 237032000
- Fate: Sold for breaking at Aliağa, Turkey
- Status: Broken up
- Notes: Underwent an extensive multi-year conversion at Perama between 1996 and 1997 to add substantial passenger accommodations and modernize the cabin layout for the Greek coastal trade.

General characteristics (following 1996/97 Perama conversion)
- Tonnage: 27,239 GT; 4,890 DWT
- Length: 192.00 m (629 ft 11 in)
- Beam: 27.00 m (88 ft 7 in)
- Draft: 6.75 m (22 ft 2 in)
- Installed power: 2 * Mitsubishi-MAN 16V52/55
- Propulsion: Twin screw
- Speed: 21.0 knots (service); 23.5 knots (max)
- Capacity: 2,500 passengers (564 berths); 600 cars or 90 trucks
- Crew: 95

Kriti II ( Greek : Κρήτη ΙΙ , Kríti II ) was a ferry operated by the Greek company ANEK Lines. Built from January to July 1979 at the Koyo Dockyard in Mihara for the Japanese company Shin Nihonkai Ferry, it was originally named New Yukari (ニューゆうかり, Nyū Yūkari). Commissioned in July 1979 on the routes connecting the islands of Honshu and Hokkaido via the Sea of Japan, it was then, along with its sister ship the New Suzuran, the largest car ferry in Japan. Sold to the Greek company ANEK Lines in 1996, it was renamed Kriti II and operated from 1997 between Greece and Italy. Subsequently assigned to the Aegean Sea on the routes between Piraeus and Crete, it remained in service on this route until its retirement in May 2024. It was sold for scrap in March 2025. It was dismantled that year by the demolition sites of Aliağa in Turkey.

== History ==
=== Origins and construction ===
In the late 1970s, the increase in freight and passenger traffic on the Shin Nihonkai Ferry lines between Honshu and Hokkaido necessitated the addition of new vessels. From the outset of its operations in 1970, the company had faced growing demand between Maizuru, Tsuruga, and Otaru, and between 1973 and 1977, it had deployed as many as five car ferries. A new line from Niigata had also been opened in 1974 to divert passenger and freight traffic; however, the recently built but outdated Ferry Lilac struggled to meet the demand. After the Ferry Hamanasu and the Akashia Ferry delivered in 1972 and 1973 respectively, and the transfer of the Tone and Tenryu Ferries into the fleet in 1974, Shin Nihonkai ordered a new pair of car ferries which would sail between Tsuruga and Otaru.

Based on the design of previous ships, the future New Suzuran and New Yūkari are nevertheless planned to be larger, notably with a length of 190 meters. Unlike their predecessors, their cargo capacity is prioritized over passenger capacity, which is thus reduced to 870 people. With a surface area of 2,268 linear meters on two levels instead of just one, the car deck is the most spacious on a car ferry in Japan, capable of transporting 163 trailers and 40 passenger vehicles, and accessible from both the front and rear via multiple simultaneous access points. Finally, the passenger facilities are designed to offer even greater comfort with suites and cabins in first class and berths in second class.

Built by the Koyo Dockyard shipyard in Mihara, just like its sister ship, the New Suzuran, the New Yūkari was launched on 30 March 1979. After completion, it was delivered to Shin Nihonkai in July 26.

=== Service ===
==== Shin Nihonkai Ferry (1979-1996) ====
The New Yūkari was put into service between Tsuruga and Otaru in juillet 1979. It joins its twin, the New Suzuran,on this line,which had been inaugurated a few months earlier in May. In 1981, work was carried out on the garage to increase its capacity, which was thus raised to 189 trailers and 85 vehicles.

The ship then continued its career without any notable incidents throughout the 1980s. From the end of the decade, the growth generated by the Japanese speculative bubble stimulated traffic on the shipping lines to Hokkaido. New, larger, and more efficient ships were successively put into service. The New Yūkari and its sister ship then appeared obsolete, especially as passenger expectations regarding comfort tended to increase. In addition, the drop in fuel prices from 1993 onward allowed Shin Nihonkai to put faster ships into service.

Supplanted in June 1996 by the sister ships Suzuran and Suisen, the New Yūkari and its twin were both sold to the Greek company ANEK Lines.

==== ANEK Lines (since 1996) ====
Taken over by ANEK Lines, the ship became the Kriti II. After leaving Japan for the Mediterranean, the car ferry underwent some modifications at the Perama shipyards to meet European standards. The common areas and cabins were also reorganized, and a lido bar with a swimming pool was added at the rear of deck 7. Its cargo capacity was increased at the expense of its towing capacity, which was slightly reduced. All these modifications were also carried out on board its sister ship, which was renamed Kriti I.

The Kriti II entered service in juin 1997 between Greece and Italy. It was intended to bolster service to both countries in a context where the Yugoslav Wars had primarily diverted the flow of passengers and goods that usually traveled by land to maritime routes. But despite the resources deployed, ANEK's fleet proved far less efficient than those of its competitors.

Replaced from the summer of 2001 by the new Olympic Champion and Hellenic Spirit, the ship nevertheless retained its assignment to Italy, but this time to Trieste. From 2002, it was transferred to the Aegean Sea on the routes between Piraeus and Crete.

In juillet 2006 the ship was chartered to evacuate Italian and Greek nationals from Lebanon during the Israeli-Lebanese conflict. The ship subsequently resumed its service between Greece and Italy.

During the night of the 19th to 20 novembre 2012 the Kriti II suffered a fire in its upper deck garage while off the coast of Patras. The ship managed to reach port and safely disembark its passengers before the fire was finally extinguished. The Kriti II then sailed to Syros for repairs.

For a few years, the Kriti II served as a reserve vessel, replacing other units in the fleet during their maintenance periods. In 2014, the Algeria Ferries company briefly considered chartering it during the summer season before the project was thwarted by engine trouble.

The ship subsequently resumed more regular service on routes to Crete until 2020. Laid up in Perama and used sporadically for three years, it finally switched in 2023 to the Heraklion route from Piraeus as its primary service, replacing its sister ship, which had been withdrawn from service. That same year, ANEK Lines was acquired by the Attica Group, owner of, among others, Superfast Ferries. This event would impact the future of the Kriti II , which was then the oldest ANEK Lines vessel still in service. Initially maintained on its usual route, the ship was nevertheless withdrawn from service in mai 2024 due to the return of the car ferry Asterion II to the ANEK fleet. A project to equip the Kriti II for a freight route was briefly considered by the Attica group but was never realized. Initially laid up at the ONEX shipyards in Eleusis, the vessel was transferred to the Gulf of Eleusis alongside its sister ship and moored to it pending a decision on its fate. Sold for scrap for $3.6 million at the beginning of the month of mars 2025, it left Greece in tow on 21 March 2026 to reach Turkey. On 23 March 2026 it was beached in Aliağa and was dismantled over the following months.

== Facilities ==
The Kriti II has eight decks. While the ship actually spans nine decks, one is absent, serving as the car deck to allow for cargo transport. Passenger accommodations occupy decks 5, 6, and 7, while decks 5, 4, and 3 are reserved for the crew. Decks 3 and 4 house the car decks.

=== Common areas ===
During its career under the Japanese flag, the New Yūkari was equipped with a restaurant, grill, lounge and Mahjong room on deck B and a show bar with dance floor and public baths on deck A.

Under the name Kriti II, the car ferry now has a lounge bar, a restaurant and a self-service restaurant on deck 6, as well as a nightclub and a lido bar with a swimming pool on deck 7.

=== Cabins ===
During the ship's time in Japan, the accommodations were divided into two classes. 1st class offered two double suites, twenty special double cabins in Japanese or Western style, 26 classic double cabins, and 26 four-berth cabins.

In 1996, renovations undertaken by ANEK Lines involved removing the second-class facilities and creating 134 cabins with two to four berths, all equipped with private bathrooms including shower, toilet, and sink. Most of these cabins are located at the front of deck 6, but some are situated on decks 7 and 5.

== Features ==
Kriti II is 191.80 meters long and 29.44 meters wide. Its original tonnage was 16,239 GT, which was slightly reduced to 14,624 GT following a refit in 1981 before finally being increased to 27,239 GT after the conversion work undertaken by ANEK in 1996. In its initial configuration, it could carry 870 passengers and had a spacious garage of 2,268 linear meters of freight space that could hold 163 trailers and 40 vehicles, then 189 trailers and 85 cars after the 1981 refit. Since 1996, it can accommodate 1,600 passengers and 600 vehicles. It was initially accessible via three ramp doors: two axial doors located at the stern, one at the bow providing access to the main garage, and a side gangway door located at the stern on the starboard side providing access to the upper garage. Since its transfer to Greek ownership, access to the garage is via two aft ramp doors; the forward and side doors have been sealed off. The Kriti II was powered by two Mitsubishi-MAN 16V52 diesel engines developing 23,875 kW, driving two propellers that propel the vessel at a speed of 22.5 knots. It was also equipped with a bow thruster and a roll stabilizer. At the time, safety equipment consisted primarily of life rafts and a rigid inflatable rescue boat. Since 1996, the ship has been equipped with four medium-sized enclosed lifeboats.

== Routes served ==
Early in its career, the New Yūkari served the Shin Nihonkai Ferry inter-island lines between the northwest coast of Honshū and Hokkaidō on the Tsuruga - Otaru route.

From 1997, under the ANEK Lines banner, the Kriti II was initially deployed on the Patras - Igoumenitsa - Ancona route between Greece and Italy, before being operated in 2001 on the Patras-Igoumenitsa - Trieste route. It was then reassigned in 2002 to the Piraeus - Heraklion route in Crete. It would periodically return to sail between Greece and Italy during the off-season, replacing other vessels normally assigned to the route.

== Accidents and Incidents ==
On 19 November 2012, while the ferry Kriti II was approximately four nautical miles northwest of its destination port of Patras—concluding a voyage from Venice, Italy—a fire broke out inside the main enclosed car deck. Thick smoke began billowing out from the vessel's decks. The ship's crew deployed the onboard drencher fire extinguishing system and organized a risk response team to contain the blaze, while safely gathering all passengers at an emergency assembly station at the stern.

Upon reaching the port of Patras, the 113 passengers and 87 crew members were safely evacuated via the stern ramp with the assistance of the Hellenic Coast Guard, local fishing boats, and harbor tugs. Shore forces from the local fire brigade then boarded the smoke-filled garage and fully extinguished the fire. No injuries were reported among the passengers or crew. Roughly 40 out of the 92 vehicles on board sustained severe damage. A subsequent official safety investigation determined that the fire originated from an electrical short circuit in a power extension cable connected to a refrigerated commercial truck.
