= Elyros (ship) =

Greek ferry

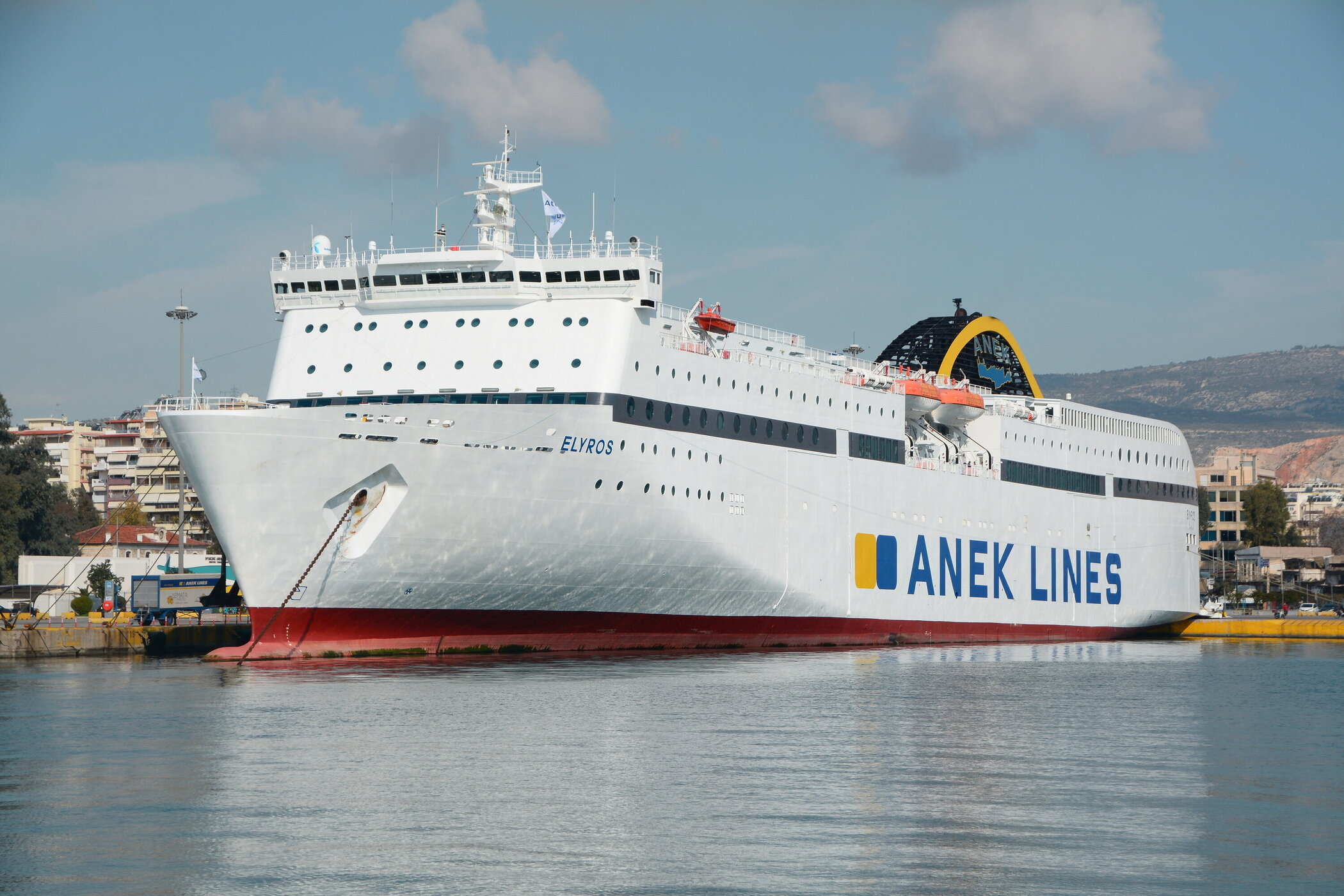
- Elyros in Piraeus

History
- Name: (1998–2007): Sun Flower Tsukuba; (2007–present): Elyros
- Owner: (1998–2002): Blue Highway Line; (2002–2007): MOL Ferry; (2007–present): ANEK Lines / Attica Group
- Operator: (1998–2002): Blue Highway Line; (2002–2007): MOL Ferry; (2007–present): ANEK Lines
- Port of registry: (1998–2007): Tokyo, Japan; (2007–present): Chania, Greece
- Route: Piraeus – Chania; Former: Oarai – Tomakomai (Japan); Former: Genoa – Tunis (charter to COTUNAV)
- Ordered: 1996
- Builder: Mitsubishi Heavy Industries; Shimonoseki, Japan
- Yard number: 1045
- Laid down: 1997
- Launched: 1997
- Completed: January 1998
- Acquired: January 1998 (as Sun Flower Tsukuba) May 2007 (by ANEK Lines)
- Maiden voyage: January 1998
- In service: 1998
- Identification: IMO number: 9178599; Call sign: SVIZ; MMSI number: 239824000
- Status: In service

General characteristics
- Class & type: Japanese Ro-Pax / ANEK Cruise Ferry
- Tonnage: 33,635 GT; 5,200 DWT
- Length: 192.00 m (629 ft 11 in)
- Beam: 27.00 m (88 ft 7 in)
- Draught: 6.70 m (22 ft 0 in)
- Depth: 15.60 m (51 ft 2 in)
- Decks: 9
- Ramps: Two stern vehicle and one passenger loading ramps
- Installed power: 2 × Pielstick 12PC4-2V diesel engines (total 26,180 kW / 35,080 hp)
- Propulsion: 2 × controllable pitch propellers
- Speed: 24.0 knots (44.4 km/h; 27.6 mph) (max) / 22.0 knots (40.7 km/h; 25.3 mph) (service)
- Capacity: 1,870 passengers (776 beds in 238 cabins); 620 cars / 1,850 lane metres for freight
- Crew: 110

Elyros is a Greek ferry, which is the second newest ship, being part of ANEK Lines fleet, following Asterion II. She is a motor Ro-Ro/Passenger ferryboat, built in 1998 at Mitsubishi Heavy Industries shipyard at Shimonoseki, Japan, and put into service by ANEK at 2008 (previously operated under different names and owners). It holds a total of 1,874 passengers and 620 vehicles, She has 323 passenger air type seats. She has two Pielstick 12PC4-2 engines, with combined power of 26,180 kW and reaches speeds of up to 24 knots. It also has an internet cafe. The ship has been awarded by ShipPax Awards 2009 as the ship with the best retrofit for 2008. It was named after Elyros; an ancient city of southwestern Crete.

== History ==
=== 1990s: Construction and first years ===
The ship was built by Mitsubishi Heavy Industries and was launched on 5 June 1997. The ship was originally named Sunflower Tsukuba, as many KK Blue Highway Line ships had the title "Sunflower" before their name, along with a red sun with orange rays to their livery. The ship was finished on 18 October 1997.

It was delivered on 19 January 1998 to KK Blue Highway Line and deployed on the route between Ōarai and Tomakomai.

=== 2000s: Mol Ferry, Higashi Nihon Ferry and arrival at Greece ===
In April 2002, the ferry was transferred to Mol Ferry, and then in 2006 to Higashi Nihon Nihon Ferry, when it was renamed Ferry Tsukuba.

It was acquired by ANEK in 2007 and renamed Elyros. On 27 August 2007, she arrived at Perama for retrofitting in order to comply with the requirements of the Mediterranean routes. The retrofit was completed in August 2008. On 26 September, she was inaugurated at 5:30 in Piraeus and on the 28th of the same month she was launched on the line between Piraeus and Chania.

=== 2010-present: charters ===
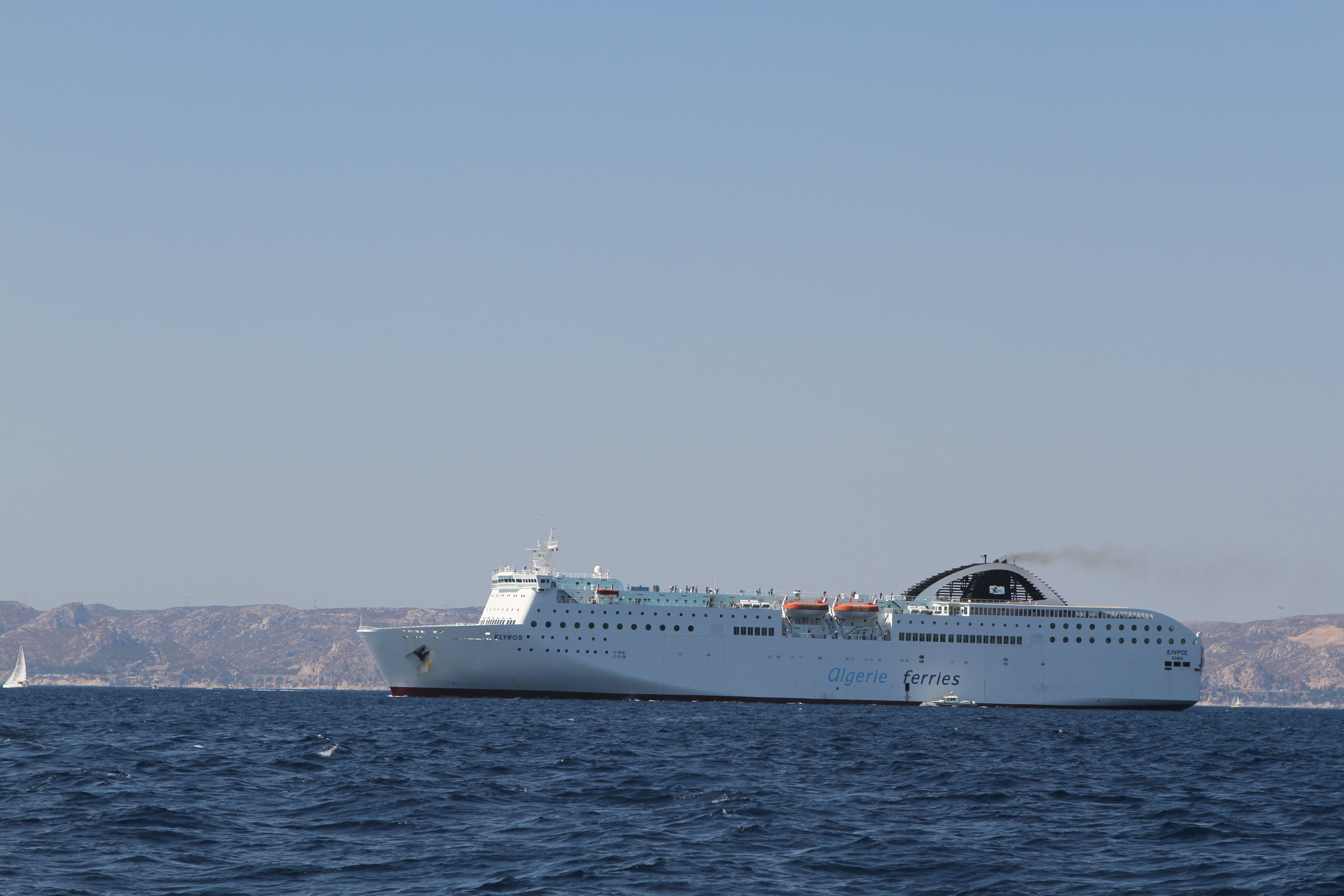
Elyros in the Algerie Ferries livery in Marseille in 2016

During the Libyan conflict in 2014, the Libyan Parliament was housed on the Elyros, which was sailing off the coast of Tombok in eastern Libya for the security of parliamentarians. The vessel was chartered from 2 September 2014 until 25 of the same month.

The ship has been chartered three times to Algerie Ferries in the summers of 2016, 2017 and 2018, linking Algiers to Alicante and Marseille. The first charter (2016) took place from 26 June 2016 until 22 September of the same year. The second (2017) began in June 2017 until September of the same year. The third began in June 2018 and was completed in September of the same year and returned to the Chania-Piraeus line on the 13th of the month.
