= Kriti I =

Greek ship

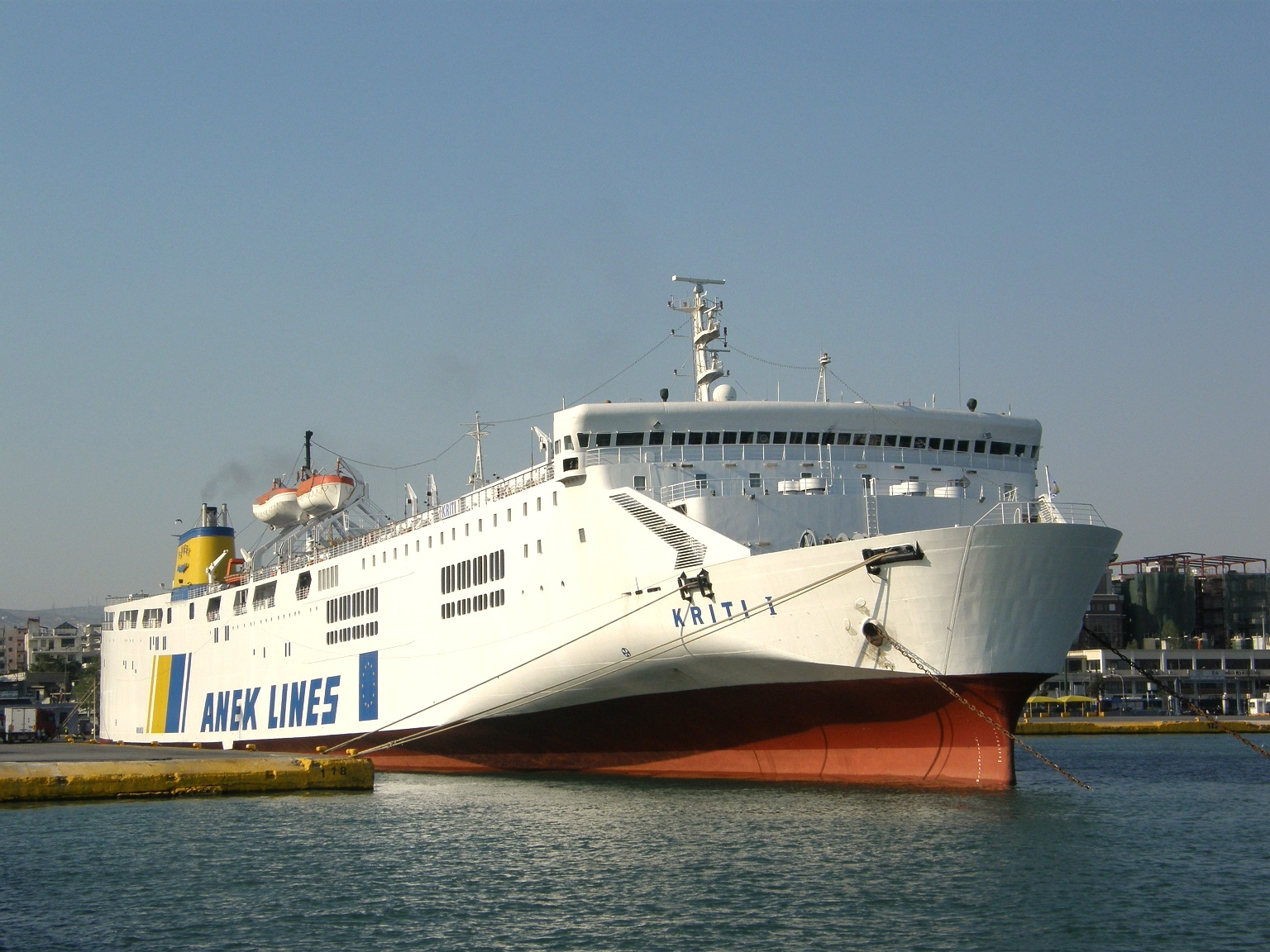
- Kriti I at Piraeus on August 14, 2008.

History
- Name: New Suzuran (1979–1996); Kriti I (1996–2025)
- Namesake: Island of Crete
- Owner: 1979–1996: Shin-Nipponkai Ferry; 1996–2025: ANEK Lines
- Operator: 1979–1996: Shin-Nipponkai Ferry; 1996–2013: ANEK Lines; 2013–2013: Go in Sardinia; 2013–2016: ANEK Lines; 2016–2016: Blue Star Ferries; 2017–2019: Grandi Navi Veloci; 2019–2025: ANEK Lines
- Port of registry: 1996–2025: Chania, Greece
- Builder: Koyo Dockyard, Japan
- Yard number: 828
- Laid down: 23 November 1978
- Launched: 22 February 1979
- Completed: 19 May 1979
- Maiden voyage: 1979
- In service: 1979
- Out of service: 2024
- Identification: IMO number: 7814046; Call sign: SZRD; MMSI number: 237022000
- Fate: Scrapped in Aliağa, Turkey in 2025

General characteristics
- Type: Ro-pax ferry
- Tonnage: 27,239 GT; 5,398 DWT
- Length: 191.8 m (629 ft 3 in)
- Beam: 29 m (95 ft 2 in)
- Draft: 6.4 m (21 ft 0 in)
- Installed power: 2 Mitsubishi-MAN; combined 16V52/55KW
- Propulsion: 2 propellers; 3 bow thrusters; 1 stern thruster
- Speed: Service 23 knots (43 km/h; 26 mph)
- Capacity: 1,500 passengers; 468 berths; 650 cars; 1,700 lane meters

Kriti I was a RO/PAX ship owned and operated by ANEK Lines. The ship was built in 1979 at Koyo Dockyard, Japan and her original name was New Suzuran.

== Service history ==
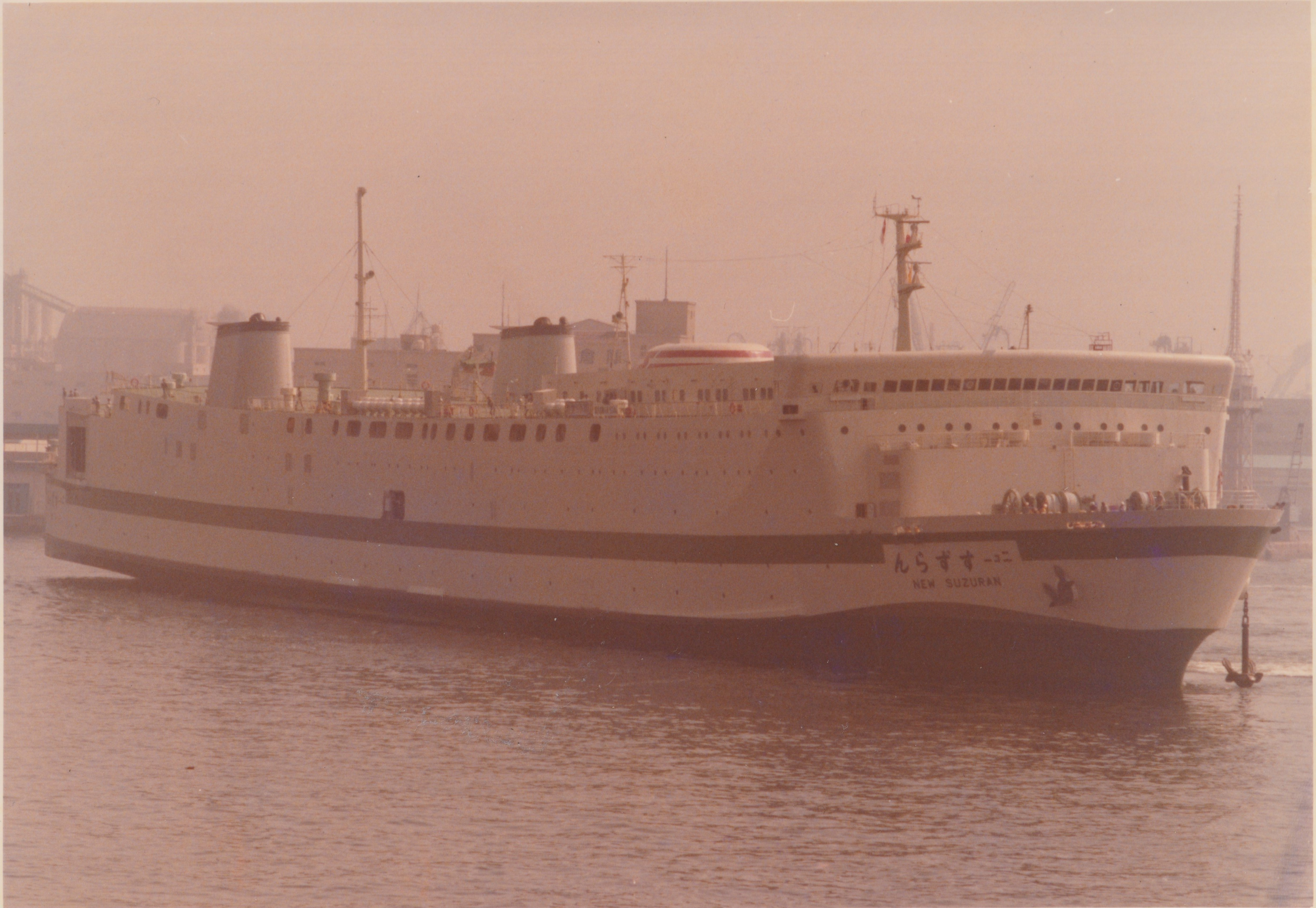
Kriti I as New Suzuran

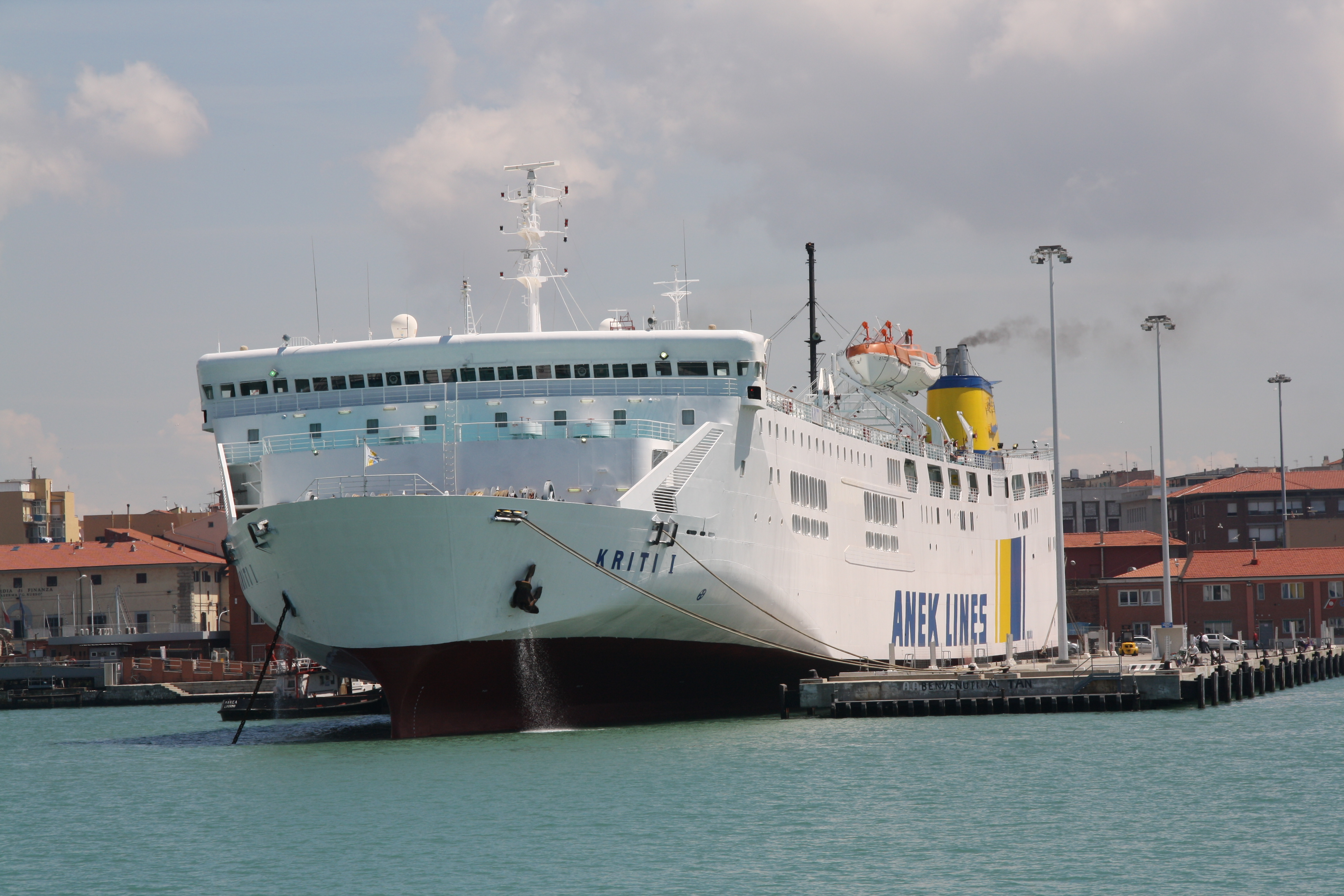
Kriti I

New Suzuran, with her sister ship New Yukari, were bought from ANEK Lines in 1996. The constructions became in Perama, Greece in 1996. After the construction the new Kriti I, with her sister ship Kriti II, served on the Patras–Igoumenitsa–Corfu–Trieste route for many years. After the arrivals of the newest ships of ANEK Lines, the Japanese ferries Lefka Ori and Sophocles Venizelos, Kriti I with her sister ship Kriti II were transferred to the Piraeus–Heraklion route. Kriti I also performed many replacements for other ships on other routes such as the Patras–Igoumenitsa–Corfu–Venice route. In 2013, the ship was chartered to an Italian company and operated on the Livorno–Olbia route but was unsuccessful due to mechanical damage. The ship, after the chartering, returned to the Piraeus–Heraklion route but again was chartered, this time to a Russian company. The ship went to Novorossiysk but never entered service and returned to Piraeus. The ship was laid-up many times and eventually, in mid-2016 Blue Star Ferries chartered it for the Piraeus–Dodecanese route for summer months only. Eventually in 2017 Kriti I was again chartered by Grandi Navi Veloci. In Italy the ship operated on the Civitavecchia–Termini Imerese route with Splendid. The ship was chartered for three years and in December 2019 Kriti I returned to Piraeus and has been laid-up since then at Perama. After a refit Kriti I re-entered service on the Piraeus-Heraklion route. The ship was laid up in Elefsina in 2024 and got scrapped in Aliağa, Turkey in 2025
