= 三原 =

三原, meaning "three, field", may refer to:

- Mihara (surname)

== Places ==
- Mihara, Hiroshima, a city in Hiroshima Prefecture
  - Mihara Station, a railway station in Mihara, Hiroshima
  - Mihara Castle, a castle that was located in Mihara, Hiroshima
- Mihara, Hyōgo, a former town in Hyōgo Prefecture
- Mihara District, Hyōgo, a former district in Hyōgo Prefecture
- Mihara, Kōchi, a village in Kōchi Prefecture
- Mount Mihara, a volcano on Izu Ōshima
- Sanyuan County

== See also ==
- The dictionary definition of 三 at Wiktionary
- The dictionary definition of 原 at Wiktionary
