= Ariadne (1996 ship) =

Greek ferry

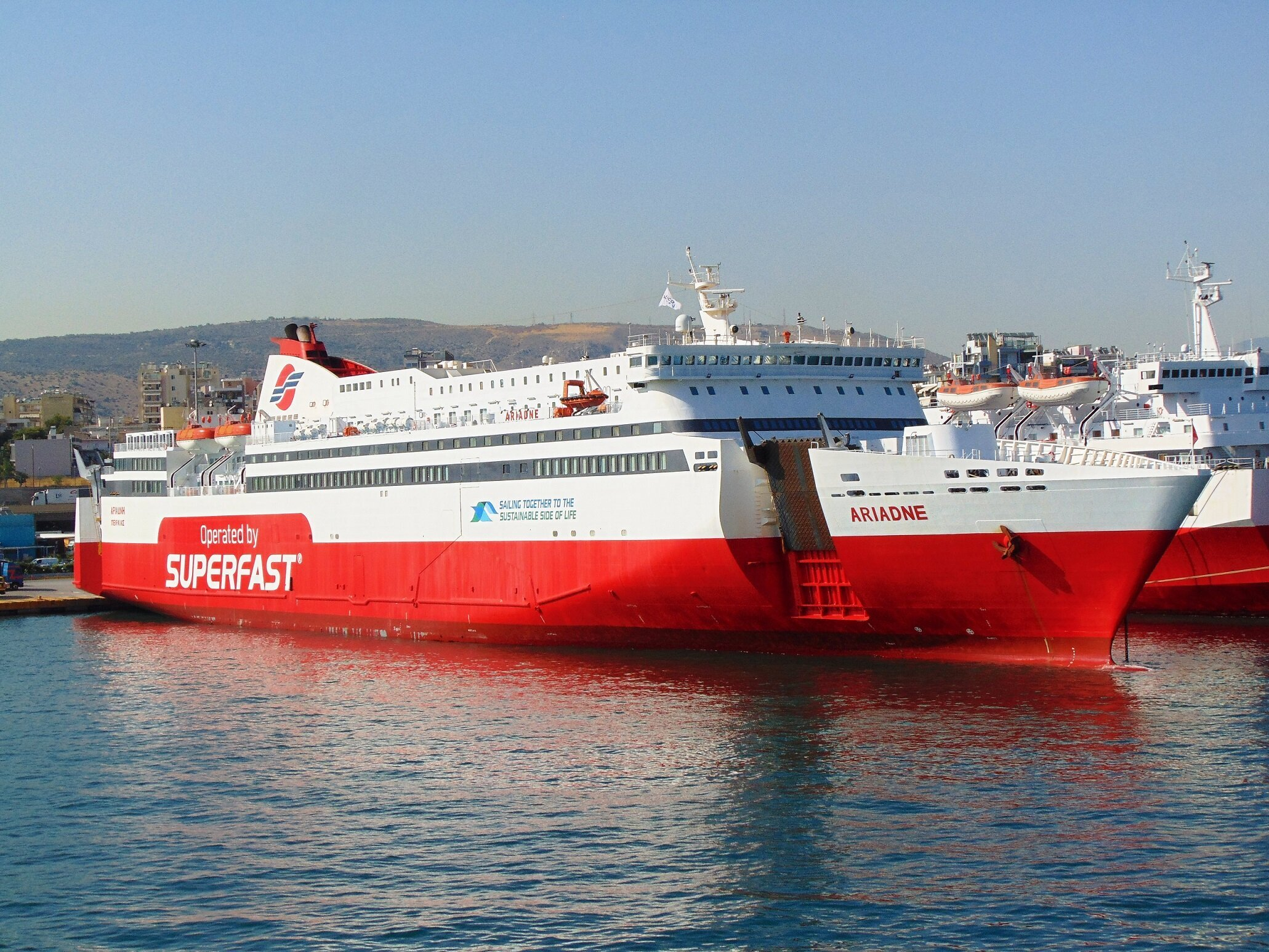
- Ariadne in Piraeus

History

Greece
- Name: Ariadne (2006–Present) Rainbow Bell (1996–2004) Ferry Himuka (2004–2006)
- Owner: Kyuetsu Ferry Co. (1996–2005); Miyazaki Car Ferry (2005–2006); Hellenic Seaways (2006–present); Attica Group (Parent since 2018)
- Operator: Minoan Lines (2008); ANEK Lines (2008–2010, 2012–2013); Algérie Ferries (Summers 2009–2012, 2018–2023); Tirrenia (2013–2017); Kyuetsu Ferry (1996–2005); Miyazaki Car Ferry (2005–2006); Hellenic Seaways (2006–2023); Superfast Ferries (2023–present)
- Port of registry: Piraeus, Greece
- Ordered: 1995
- Builder: Mitsubishi Heavy Industries, Shimonoseki, Japan
- Yard number: 1020
- Laid down: 8 December 1995
- Launched: 1996
- Completed: 28 March 1996
- Identification: IMO number: 9135262; MMSI: 240580000; Call sign: SVST
- Status: In service

General characteristics
- Type: Ro-pax ferry
- Tonnage: 30,882 GT
- Length: 195.95 m (642.9 ft)
- Beam: 27.00 m (88.58 ft)
- Draft: 6.70 m (22.0 ft)
- Installed power: 34,440 kW (Total)
- Propulsion: 2 × NKK-Pielstick 14PC4-2V diesel engines
- Speed: 24 knots (service); 27.5 knots (max)
- Capacity: 2,045 passengers; 640 cars (2,050 lane meters)

Ariadne (in Greek : Αριάδνη, Ariádni ) is a ferry belonging to Attica group. Built from 1995 to 1996 at the Mitsubishi Heavy Industries shipyard in Shimonoseki for the Japanese company Higashi Nihon Ferry, it was originally named Rainbow Bell (れいんぼうべる, Reinbō Beru) . Commissioned in April 1996 between Niigata Prefecture on Honshu Island and Fukuoka Prefecture on Kyushu Island, its operation struggled to become profitable and was discontinued in 2001. Purchased in 2004 by Marine Express, it was renamed Ferry Himuka (フェリーひむか, Ferī Himuka) and assigned to the Osaka – Miyazaki Prefecture route, also on Kyushu Island. Transferred in 2005 to Miyazaki Car Ferry following Marine Express's bankruptcy, it was withdrawn from service the following year and sold to the Greek company Hellenic Seaways . Renamed Ariadne, it underwent a major refit aimed at increasing its capacity and improving passenger comfort. In service in the Mediterranean since September 2007, it has been chartered several times by other companies, in particular Algérie Ferries during the summers of 2009 to 2013 or more recently Tirrenia between 2018 and 2021. Transferred to Superfast Ferries in December 2023, it currently sails between Greece and Italy.

== History ==
=== Origins and construction ===
In 1991, Higashi Nihon Ferry and Fukuoka Prefecture established a partnership to operate a ferry service between Fukuoka and Niigata Prefecture on Honshu Island . The newly formed Kyu-Etsu Ferry company initially chartered the ferry Hercules . However, this vessel quickly proved unsuitable for the sometimes harsh weather conditions of the Sea of Japan . The decision was therefore made to commission the construction of two ships specifically designed for this route. In anticipation of this, Kyu-Etsu Ferry's capital was increased to 800 million yen.

The future ships are designed based on the Hermes, Hercules, and Hestia vessels of Higashi Nihon Ferry, with similar dimensions. However, the hulls have a more robust appearance to ensure proper navigation even in rough weather. Designed by the French firm SDI, headed by architect Joël Bretecher, the future vessels boast a distinctive, more elegant design that contrasts sharply with typical Japanese shipbuilding styles.

Intended to carry just over 300 passengers, the dedicated passenger facilities occupy two decks and are varied, including a restaurant, a panoramic café, and various entertainment options such as a cinema and karaoke, as well as comfortable cabins. Like most Japanese ferries, the car deck is primarily designed for freight transport, with a capacity for 150 trailers and 70 passenger vehicles.

Construction of the first ship, named Rainbow Bell , was undertaken by Mitsubishi Heavy Industries and began in Shimonoseki on July 3, 1995. The ship was launched on December 8 and completed over approximately five months. It was delivered to its owner on March 28, 1996.

=== Service ===
==== Kyu-Etsu Ferry (1996–2004) ====
The Rainbow Bell entered service on April 9, 1996, between Jōetsu and Fukuoka. Joined in 1997 by its sister ship, the Rainbow Love , the two vessels then operated a daily round trip in tandem. However, the route quickly proved unprofitable due to low passenger demand relative to supply. Consequently, in September 1998, the route was extended to Muroran on the island of Hokkaido, and the frequency was reduced to one departure every two days.

Despite the measures taken, the company struggled to attract passengers, so in 2001, the Rainbow Bell and its sister ship were withdrawn from service and replaced by newer, smaller vessels. The Rainbow Bell was then laid up in Muroran. Left unused for approximately three years, it was purchased in March 2004 by the Marine Express company.

==== Marine Express/Miyazaki Car Ferry (2004–2006) ====
Received by its new owner, the ship was renamed Ferry Himuka. After some conversion work during which its hull was repainted red, it was put into service in 2004 between Ōsaka and the cities of Hyūga and Miyazaki on the island of Kyūshū.

In October of that same year, it was transferred to the Miyazaki Car Ferry fleet due to financial difficulties encountered by Marine Express. From 2005, it operated crossings between Osaka and Hyuga alongside the car ferry Phoenix Express until Miyazaki Car Ferry finally decided to discontinue service on the route in April 2006. Laid up in Nagasaki, the Himuka Ferry was acquired in November 2006 by the Greek company Hellenic Seaways.

==== Hellenic Seaways (since 2006) ====
Renamed Ariadne, the ship departed Nagasaki on December 15, 2006, bound for Greece . Arriving at its destination on January 1, 2007, it entered the Perama shipyard for extensive refitting aimed at increasing its capacity and, more importantly, adapting its facilities to the standards of Mediterranean cruise lines . To this end, the superstructures at the stern were lengthened by adding several sections, and the existing spaces were reconfigured with new bars, restaurants, and cabins. These renovations were completed in September 2007.

On September 25, the refurbished vessel entered service on Hellenic Seaways' routes between Piraeus and Crete . In January 2008, it was chartered by Minoan Lines, which operated it between Greece and Italy. When the contract ended in March, it was laid up in Piraeus before returning to serve Crete under charter to ANEK Lines.

From May 2009, the Ariadne was chartered by the Algerian state-owned company Algérie Ferries , which operated it during the summer season between Algeria, France, and Spain . The ship was chartered by the Algerian company every summer until 2013. During the winter off-season, it was assigned to Hellenic Seaways routes in the Aegean Sea, and sometimes to Turkey or Israel, as it did during the winter of 2012–2013.

During the winter of 2017–2018, the ship was chartered by the Italian company Grandi Navi Veloci to replace a vessel in its fleet that had been requisitioned for a humanitarian mission in the Caribbean. It sailed on GNV routes between mainland Italy and Sicily until February 2018. From March onwards, it was chartered again, this time by the Italian company Tirrenia, which operated it between Naples and Cagliari, in southern Sardinia .

In January 2021, Tirrenia terminated the charter contract for the vessel, which returned to the Hellenic Seaways fleet. After regaining its owner's colors, the owner decided to use it on its routes connecting Piraeus to the Cyclades and the Dodecanese.

In December 2023, the Attica Group, parent company of Hellenic Seaways, officially announced its acquisition of ANEK Lines. This acquisition led to a reorganization of the group's fleets in the following months. The Ariadne was transferred to the Superfast Ferries fleet in December. After a brief stop at the Perama shipyards, where its hull was repainted red and the Superfast logos were added to its sides and funnel, the vessel entered service on routes between Greece and Italy starting December 15. A few months later, in March 2024, it was chartered again by Algérie Ferries to replace the Badji Mokhtar III ferry during its maintenance period. After arriving in Algiers on March 22, it began its rotations between Algeria and France on March 24. Returned to Superfast in April, it briefly resumed sailing from May between Piraeus and Crete before switching permanently to Greek-Italian routes.

== Facilities ==
The Ariadne has 11 decks. Two of them are empty at the garage level to allow the ship to carry cargo. Passenger accommodations occupy decks 7, 8, and 9, while the crew quarters are on deck 10. Decks 3 and 5 house the garages.

=== Common areas ===
During the ship's Japanese period, passengers had at their disposal a 120-seat restaurant, a panoramic cafe, two public baths (called sentō ), as well as a karaoke room, a 48-seat cinema, a gym, and a smoking room.

Since the transformations carried out by Hellenic Seaways, the ship is equipped on deck 7 with a lounge at the front and a self-service area at the rear, as well as a shop and a games room.

=== Cabins ===
On board the Rainbow Bell, the cabins were located on decks 7 and 8. The ship was equipped with twelve double suites, six double cabins, ten triple cabins (five Western-style and five Japanese-style), 24 Western-style cabins for four, two Japanese-style cabins for four, and one for eight. The ship also had four dormitories for twelve and three for eight.

Today, the ship has 145 private cabins on decks 8 and 9 for a total of 459 berths. All cabins have private bathrooms including shower, toilet and sink.

== Features ==
The Ariadne is 195.95 meters long and 27 meters wide. Its original tonnage was 13,597 GT (which is not entirely accurate, as the tonnage of Japanese car ferries is defined using different criteria), before being increased to 30,882 GT during its 2007 refit. In its initial configuration, it could carry 350 passengers and 77 vehicles in a spacious garage that could also accommodate 154 trailers, accessible via two side ramp doors, one at the bow and the other at the stern on the starboard side, and a central aft door. Today, the ship can carry 2,045 passengers and 560 vehicles. Its garage access points remain unchanged, although a dedicated pedestrian ramp has been added at the stern. The Ariadne is propelled by two Nippon Kokan-Pielstick 14PC4-2V diesel engines, each producing 33,980 kW and driving two propellers, propelling the vessel at a speed of 24.9 knots. It is also equipped with two bow thrusters, which at the time were the most powerful ever installed on a Japanese ship, as well as a roll stabilizer. Safety equipment at the time consisted primarily of life rafts and a rigid inflatable rescue boat. Since 2007, the ship has been equipped with four large, enclosed lifeboats.

== Routes served ==
At the beginning of its career, the ship operated services between Honshū and Kyūshū on the Jōetsu – Fukuoka route for the Kyu-Etsu Ferry company . From 1998, the route was extended to the island of Hokkaido with a stopover in Muroran .

From 2004, the ship served the Marine Express line between Ōsaka, Hyūga and Miyazaki and then from 2005 the Ōsaka – Hyūga line for Miyazaki Car Ferry .

From 2007 onwards, the ship sailed for Hellenic Seaways in the Aegean Sea between Piraeus and Crete, but also in the Adriatic Sea between Greece and Italy on the Patras – Igoumenitsa – Venice route under charter by Minoan Lines and between Patras, Igoumenitsa Corfu and Venice under the colors of ANEK Lines .

During the summers of 2009 to 2013, the ship sailed between Algeria, France and Spain from Algiers and Oran to Marseille and Alicante under charter by the company Algérie Ferries .

Assigned to the Aegean Sea during the winter to the islands of Chios or Lesbos , it had special assignments to Alexandretta in Turkey or Haifa in Israel during the winter of 2012–2013.

During the winter of 2017–2018, it made crossings between mainland Italy and Sicily on the Civitavecchia – Palermo line under charter by the company Grandi Navi Veloci .

From March 2018 to January 2021, the Ariadne operated the link between mainland Italy and Sardinia on the Naples – Cagliari line under the colors of the Italian company Tirrenia .

From March 2021 to December 2023, it is assigned to Hellenic Seaways connections to the Cyclades and Dodecanese archipelagos between Piraeus and the islands of Syros, Patmos, Leros, Kalymnos, Kos and Rhodes .

Transferred to Superfast Ferries, it has been sailing between Greece and Italy on the Patras – Igoumenitsa – Venice route since December 2023 .

After the 2025 summer season where she was serving in the Piraeus-Chios-Mytilene route,she was sent to on the Piraeus-Milos-Chania route.
