= Mihara =

Mihara may refer to:

== People ==
- Mihara (surname)

== Places in Japan ==
- Mihara, Hiroshima, a city in Hiroshima Prefecture
  - Mihara Station, a railway station in Mihara, Hiroshima
  - Mihara Castle, a castle that was located in Mihara, Hiroshima
- Mihara, Hyōgo, a former town in Hyōgo Prefecture
- Mihara District, Hyōgo, a former district in Hyōgo Prefecture
- Mihara, Kōchi, a village in Kōchi Prefecture
- Mihara, Osaka, a former town in Osaka Prefecture
- Mount Mihara, a volcano on Izu Ōshima
