= Kydon =

Japanese-built ferry

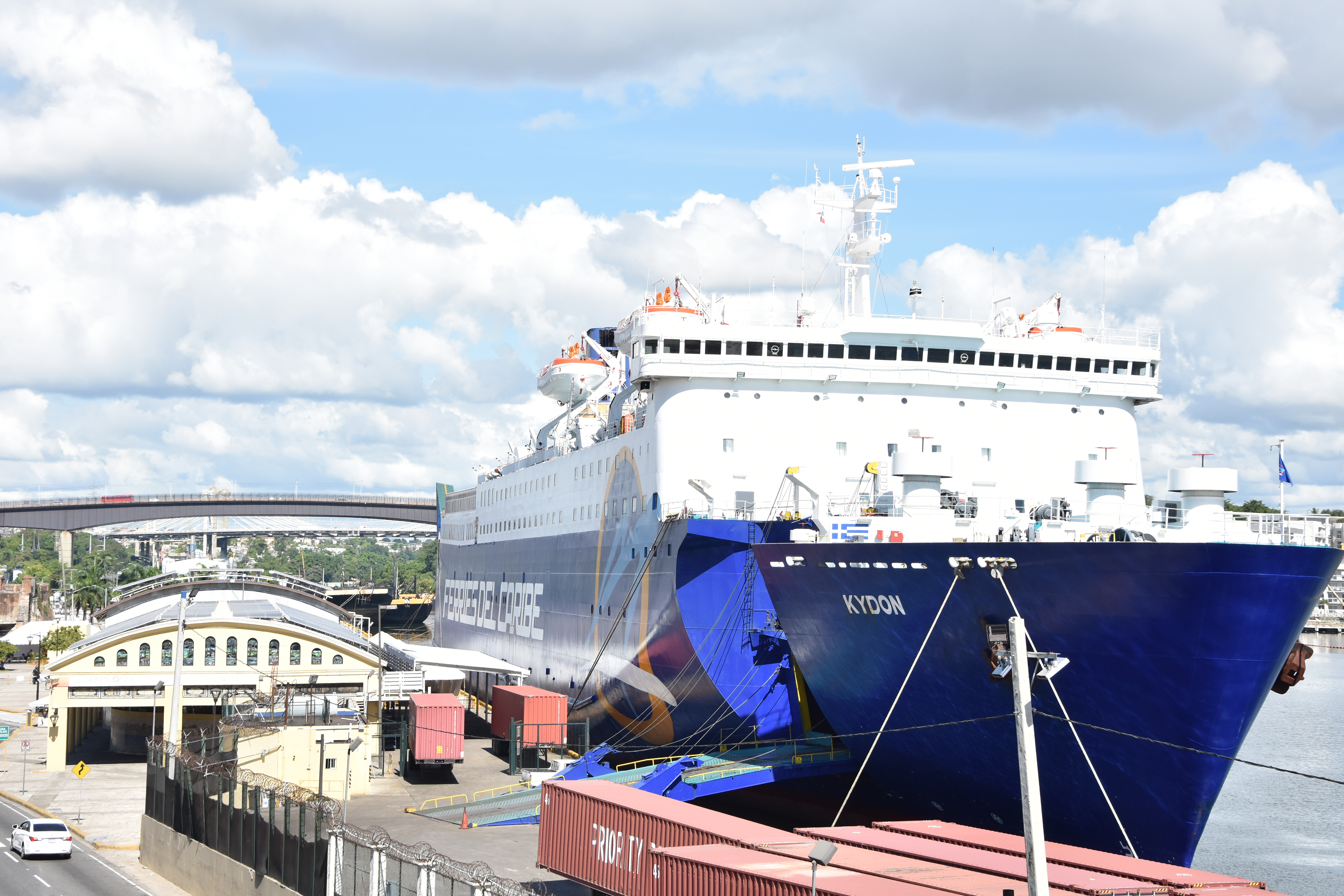
- Kydon in Santo Domingo

History
- Name: (1990–1998): Hermes; (1998–1999): Sofoklis Venizelos; (1999–2012): Sophocles V; (2012–2013): Elizabeth L; (2013–2015): Sophocles V; (2015–present): Kydon
- Owner: (1990–1998): Kyuhei Ferry; (1998–2023): ANEK Lines; (2023–present): Blue Star Ferries / Attica Group
- Operator: (1990–1998): Kyuhei Ferry; (1998–2012): ANEK Lines; (2012–2013): Jeju Cruise Line (chartered); (2013–2015): ANEK Lines; (2015–present): Ferries del Caribe (chartered)
- Port of registry: (1990–1998): Japan; (1998–2020): Chania / Piraeus, Greece; (2020–present): Nassau, Bahamas
- Route: San Juan (Puerto Rico) – Santo Domingo (Dominican Republic)
- Builder: Mitsubishi Heavy Industries (Shimonoseki Shipyard), Japan
- Yard number: 935
- Launched: 29 March 1990
- Completed: 11 July 1990
- Acquired: 1998 (by ANEK Lines)
- Maiden voyage: 1990
- In service: 1990
- Identification: IMO number: 8916607; Call sign: C6EP8; MMSI number: 311000966
- Status: In service
- Notes: Named after the ancient city of Kydonia (modern-day Chania).

General characteristics
- Tonnage: 29,991 GT; 6,987 DWT
- Length: 192.0 m (629 ft 11 in)
- Beam: 27.0 m (88 ft 7 in)
- Draft: 6.7 m (22 ft 0 in)
- Installed power: 2 × Nippon Kokan-Pielstick 12PC4-2V diesel engines (26,180 kW)
- Propulsion: Twin screw
- Speed: 24.5 knots (service); 25.0 knots (maximum)
- Capacity: 1,600 passengers; 1,100 lane metres
- Notes: Sister ship to Kissamos

Kydon (Greek: Κύδων, Kýdon) is a ferry operated by the Puerto Rican shipping company Ferries del Caribe. The ferry was built by Mitsubishi Heavy Industries in Shimonoseki, Japan, for Higashi Nihon Ferry and Hayashi Marine Co. It was sold to ANEK Lines in 1998 and subsequently underwent extensive refurbishment. Since 2017, it has operated in the Caribbean under charter to Ferries del Caribe.

== History ==
=== Origins and construction ===
In the late 1980s, Higashi Nihon Ferry considered opening a new route connecting Hokkaido with Niigata Prefecture via the Sea of Japan. To serve the route, the company planned to introduce two identical vessels in the early 1990s.

The ships were based on the design of the sister ships Varuna and Victory, which had entered service on Pacific coast routes in the late 1980s. They measured 192 metres in length and had an initial gross tonnage of approximately 13,000 GT. Their design centred on a large two-level garage extending across four decks, with capacity for 180 trailers and approximately 100 vehicles. They were designed to carry 700 passengers, with passenger facilities spread across three decks. These included private first-class cabins, a restaurant, a bar, and traditional Japanese public baths.

The first vessel, named Hermes after the messenger god of Greek mythology, was laid down on 20 October 1989 at the Mitsubishi Heavy Industries shipyard in Shimonoseki. It was launched on 29 March 1990 and completed over the following four months, being delivered to Higashi Nihon Ferry on 11 July.

== Service ==
=== Higashi Nihon Ferry (1990–1998) ===
Hermes entered service on 19 July 1990 between Jōetsu and Hokkaido. It operated two round trips per week to Iwanai and one to Muroran. In April 1992, it was joined by its sister ship, Hercules, allowing three crossings per day to be offered across the two routes.

By the late 1990s, Higashi Nihon Ferry's Sea of Japan routes were operating at a loss. In September 1998, in an effort to maintain its service between Kyushu and Jōetsu, the company combined it with the Hokkaido route and extended the itinerary to Muroran. The new service was operated by the sister ships Rainbow Bell and Rainbow Love, replacing Hermes and Hercules. Following the arrival of the new Varuna on the Iwanai route in November, the two ships no longer had a regular assignment. Hercules was transferred to Pacific routes, while Hermes was sold to the Greek company ANEK Lines.

=== ANEK Lines and subsequent service (1998–present) ===
Renamed Sofoklis Venizelos in honour of the Cretan politician Sofoklis Venizelos, the ship left Japan for Greece at the end of 1998. Upon arrival at the Perama shipyards, it underwent extensive refurbishment. New cabins were added, and the stern was extended to accommodate a lido bar and swimming pool. Following completion of the work in June 1999, the ship was renamed Sophocles V.

The ferry entered service on 2 July on ANEK Lines routes across the Adriatic Sea between Greece and Italy. In July 2000, it was joined by its sister ship, the former Hercules, which had also been acquired by ANEK and renamed Lefka Ori.

In the early 2010s, Greek ferry operators faced financial pressure caused in part by rising fuel prices. To reduce operating costs, ANEK Lines withdrew Sophocles V and its sister ship from service and offered them for charter.

Initially laid up at Patras, the two vessels were chartered in June by the South Korean shipping company Jeju Cruise Line. After leaving Greece at the beginning of the month, they arrived in South Korea on 26 June. They were intended to operate a route between Shanghai, Jeju Island, and Kitakyushu, but the service never began despite the ships being repainted in the company's colours. The vessel consequently remained laid up in Busan. During this period, it was unofficially known as Elizabeth L. It returned to Greece in December and resumed ANEK Lines colours following a stay at the Perama shipyards.

From May 2014, the ship was chartered by the Sardinian consortium GoInSardinia and operated between mainland Italy and Sardinia until July. The consortium had originally intended to charter Lato, another ANEK Lines ferry, but that vessel suffered damage shortly before it was due to enter service. From mid-July, Sophocles V operated between Algeria and Spain under charter to the state-owned company Algérie Ferries until September.

After returning to ANEK, ownership of the vessel was transferred to Hellas 1 Leasing Maritime Co. Following a winter lay-up, it returned to service on 21 July 2015 on ANEK Lines routes between Piraeus and Crete. At that time, it was renamed Kydon and underwent further refurbishment, including modernisation of its interior.

In April 2017, the ship was chartered by the Puerto Rican company Ferries del Caribe. It left Greece for the Caribbean on 14 April and began operating between Puerto Rico and the Dominican Republic on 4 May, after being repainted in the company's colours, including a blue hull.

== Facilities ==
Kydon has 10 numbered decks. Although the ship physically extends across 11 deck levels, one deck number is omitted in the vehicle-deck area to provide sufficient clearance for cargo. Passenger accommodation occupies decks 6 and 7 and part of deck 8, while crew accommodation is located at the forward end of deck 8. Decks 3 and 4 contain the vehicle decks.

=== Common areas ===
During the ship's Japanese service, passengers had access to a restaurant and café-bar on deck 8, two public baths (sentō) and two games rooms on deck 7, and a cinema and shop on deck 6.

Following the alterations carried out by ANEK Lines, the ship was equipped with an ice-cream parlour, veranda, and lounge bar on deck 6; a lounge and outdoor bar on deck 7; and a restaurant and self-service restaurant on deck 8. Until 2015, a swimming pool was located at the stern adjacent to the outdoor bar, but it has since been removed.

=== Cabins ===
As Hermes, the ship's cabins were located on decks 6 and 7. First-class accommodation consisted of 28 double cabins, 24 four-berth Western-style cabins, and 25 four-berth Japanese-style cabins. Second-class accommodation comprised 48 berths distributed among larger shared cabins and five dormitories, providing a total of 232 sleeping places.

The ship now has around 100 private cabins on decks 7 and 8, providing a total of approximately 650 berths. All cabins have private bathrooms with a shower, toilet, and sink.

== Features ==
Kydon is 192 metres long and 27 metres wide. Its original gross tonnage was 13,384 GT, although Japanese domestic tonnage measurements were calculated using different criteria. Its gross tonnage increased to 29,378 GT following its 1999 refit and to 29,991 GT in 2015.

In its original configuration, the ship could carry 700 passengers and approximately 100 vehicles, together with up to 180 trailers. The garage was accessed through two side ramp doors, one forward and one aft on the starboard side, together with a central stern door. The ship can now carry 1,600 passengers and provides 1,100 lane metres of vehicle capacity. Its garage access points remain largely unchanged, although a dedicated pedestrian ramp has been added at the stern.

Kydon is powered by two Nippon Kokan-Pielstick 12PC4-2V diesel engines producing a combined 26,180 kW and driving two propellers, giving the vessel a maximum speed of approximately 26 knots. It is also fitted with two bow thrusters, a stern thruster, and a roll stabiliser. Its original lifesaving equipment consisted primarily of life rafts and a rigid inflatable rescue boat. Since 1999, the ship has also been equipped with four large enclosed lifeboats.

== Routes served ==
From 1990 to 1998, Hermes operated for Higashi Nihon Ferry between Niigata Prefecture and Hokkaido, serving the Jōetsu–Iwanai and Jōetsu–Muroran routes.

From 1999, the ship operated ANEK Lines services between Greece and Italy, initially on the Patras–Igoumenitsa–Corfu–Trieste route and, from 2005 to 2012, on the Patras–Igoumenitsa–Corfu–Venice route.

From May to July 2014, the ship was chartered by the Sardinian company GoInSardinia and operated between mainland Italy and Sardinia on the Livorno–Arbatax route. It was subsequently operated between Algeria and Spain on the Oran–Alicante route under charter to Algérie Ferries.

From 2015 to 2017, it operated between Piraeus and Chania in Crete for ANEK Lines.

Since 2017, it has operated under charter to Ferries del Caribe between Puerto Rico and the Dominican Republic on the San Juan–Santo Domingo route.

== Accidents and incidents ==
=== 2015 fire ===
On 19 September 2015, a minor fire broke out aboard Kydon while it was docked at the Agios Dionysios area of the port of Piraeus.

Personnel from the local Port Authority and the Fire Service responded to the incident. The fire, which originated for an unknown reason in the main engine room ventilation intake chamber, had already been extinguished by the ship's crew. The incident caused minor material damage, with no injuries or marine pollution reported.

The First Port District of the Central Port Authority of Piraeus opened a preliminary investigation and initially detained the vessel. Kydon was subsequently cleared to return to service after its classification society issued a certificate confirming that it remained in class.

=== 2017 allision ===
On 18 May 2017, the 192-metre-long ro-ro passenger ferry Kydon struck the quay at the port of Santo Domingo, Dominican Republic, while carrying out a mooring manoeuvre on arrival. No passenger injuries were reported, but the impact caused substantial damage to several containers and vehicles parked on the pier. No environmental pollution was reported.
