= Nissos Rodos =

Greek car ferry

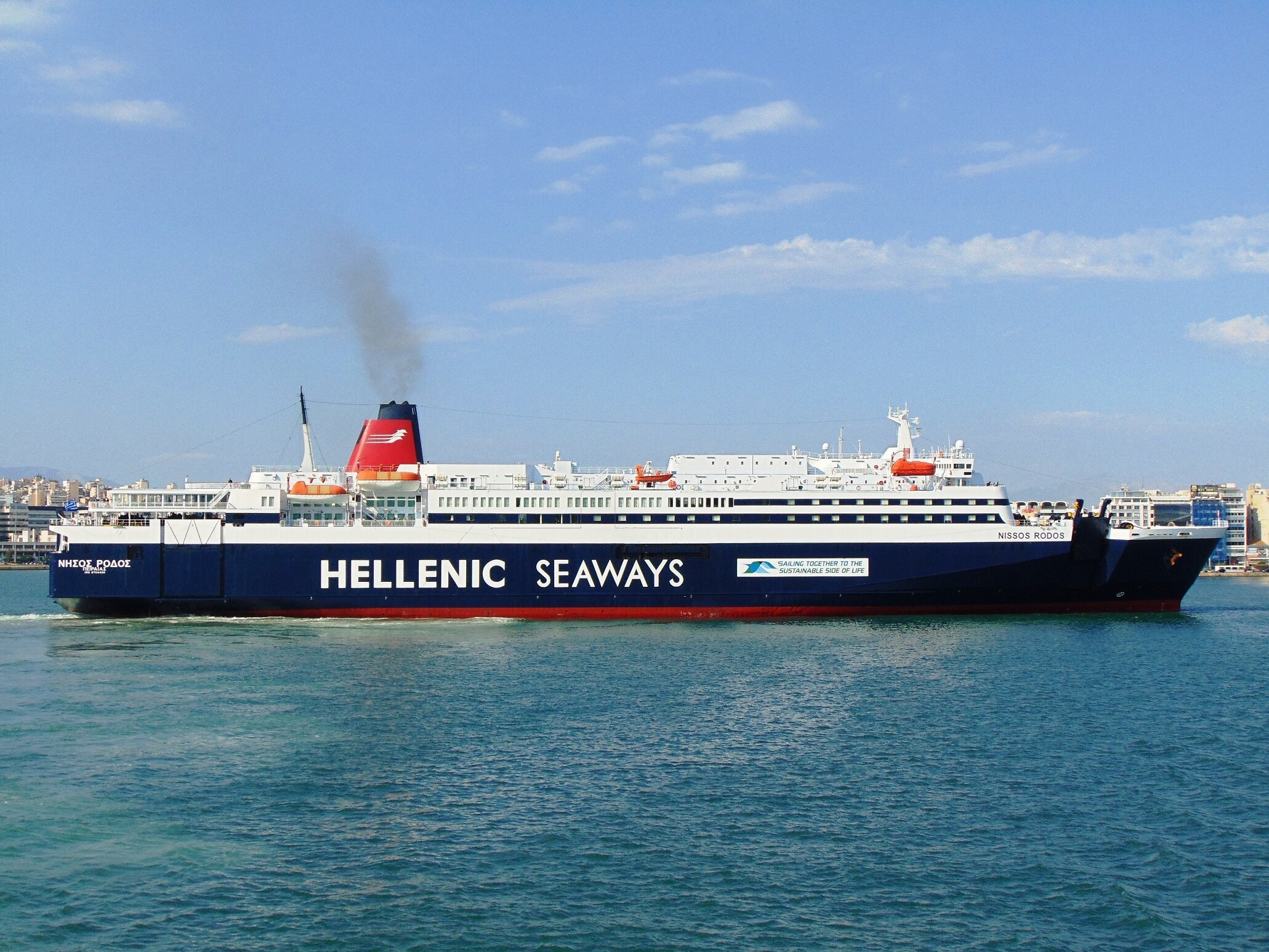
- Nissos Rodos in Piraeus

History

Greece
- Name: Kiso (1987–2005); Ocean Trailer (2005–2007); Hellenic Voyager (2007–2010); Nissos Rhodes (2010–2011)
- Namesake: Island of Rhodes
- Owner: Taiheiyo Ferry (1987–2005); Hellenic Seaways (2005–present); Attica Group (Parent company since 2018)
- Operator: Taiheiyo Ferry (1987–2005); Hellenic Seaways (2005–present); Blue Star Ferries (Joint service/rebranding, 2020–present)
- Route: Piraeus- Heraklion
- Builder: Mitsubishi Heavy Industries, Japan
- Yard number: 902
- Launched: 1 July 1987
- Completed: 20 October 1987
- Identification: IMO number: 8704406; MMSI: 240558000; Call sign: SYQJ
- Status: In service

General characteristics
- Type: Ro-Pax ferry
- Tonnage: 29,719 GT
- Length: 192.51 m (631 ft 7 in)
- Beam: 27.01 m (88 ft 7 in)
- Draft: 6.7 m (22 ft 0 in)
- Installed power: 17,210 kW (23,080 hp) (Combined)
- Propulsion: 2 × Mitsubishi-MAN diesel engines
- Speed: 23 knots (43 km/h; 26 mph) (max)
- Capacity: 2,210 passengers; 750 cars (2,105 lane meters)

Nissos Rodos (Greek: Νήσος Ρόδος, romanized: Nísos Ródos) is a ferry owned by the Greek company Hellenic Seaways. Built in 1987 by the Mitsubishi Heavy Industries shipyard in Shimonoseki for the Japanese company Taiheiyō Ferry, it was originally named Kiso (Japanese: きそ, romanized: Kiso). It entered service in October 1987. On routes between the Pacific coast of Honshū and Hokkaido, it will be replaced in 2005 by the new Kiso. Sold in August 2004 to the Greek company Hellas Ferries (which would later change its name to Hellenic Seaways), the ship reached the Mediterranean in March 2005. Initially operated in the Adriatic Sea between Greece and Italy under the name Ocean Trailer, it sailed between Italy and Spain between 2005 and 2007 under charter to the Italian company Grimaldi Lines. It was renamed Hellenic Voyager in 2007 and then Nissos Rodos in 2010. It is assigned to various Hellenic Seaways routes in the Adriatic or Aegean Seas depending on the season.

== History ==
=== Origins and construction ===
In the late 1980s, Taiheiyō Ferry embarked on a major fleet renewal program to replace its existing vessels, which had been put into service by its predecessor, Taiheiyō Enkai Ferry, in the early 1970s. Taking advantage of an economic upturn that primarily stimulated the market for maritime routes between Honshū and Hokkaido, the company quickly invested in the construction of new ships. The project aimed to replace the fleet's three car ferries between 1987 and 1991. Their dimensions were set at 192 meters (629 ft 11 in) in length and 27 m (88 ft 7 in) in width. Their speed was set at 24 knots (44 km/h; 28 mph) to slightly reduce crossing time. Due to a decline in passenger numbers caused by competition from air and rail travel, their passenger capacity was reduced compared to the previous generation. On the other hand, the rolling capacity is increased, due to the length of the ships as well as the increase in the area devoted to garages.

Unlike their predecessors, whose amenities were deliberately limited for the sake of functionality, the new ships are designed to be modern and luxurious. Two entire decks are dedicated to passengers, who will be able to enjoy a restaurant, a lounge bar, and numerous walkways opening onto the sea. Cabin comfort has also been significantly improved, with more spacious suites, most of which are equipped with private bathrooms.

The construction of the first ship, named Kiso, was entrusted to the Mitsubishi Heavy Industries shipyards in Shimonoseki. The keel laying took place on February 10, 1987, and the ship was launched on July 1. Construction then continued for almost three months, and the car ferry was delivered to Taiheiyō Ferry on October 20, 1987.

=== Service ===
==== Taiheiyō Ferry (1987–2005) ====
Kiso was put into service in October 1987 between Nagoya, Sendai, and Tomakomai as a replacement for Arkas. It was later joined by Kitakami in 1989 and by Ishikari in 1991. The three ships were, at the beginning of the 1990s, the most luxurious in Japan. In the early 2000s, Taiheiyō Ferry decided to build a new vessel to replace Kiso. Constructed by the same shipyards as its predecessor, the new Kiso was scheduled to begin operations in 2005. In anticipation of the commissioning of its replacement, the old Kiso was sold in August 2004to the Greek company Hellas Ferries. However, it continued to sail under the Taiheiyō Ferry banner until the beginning of 2005.

==== Hellenic Seaways (since 2005) ====
Delivered to its new owner on January 5, 2005, the ship was renamed Ocean Trailer and transferred to Cypriot control. The car ferry left Japan permanently on February 10 to reach Greece. After about twenty days at sea, he reached Piraeus on March 3. After some modifications, the ship began its sailings in May between Greece and Italy under the Hellenic Seaways banner, the new name for Hellas Ferries. It only made a few crossings on this route before being chartered that same month by the Italian company Grimaldi Lines. It was then operated by Grimaldi Lines between Italy and Spain before being returned to Hellenic Seaways in September 2007. During its technical stop at Perama in October 2007, the ship was renamed Hellenic Voyager. It then resumed its crossings between Greece and Italy from November.

In August 2009 the ship then went to the Drapetsóna shipyards for extensive modifications. The interior was completely modernized and additional lifesaving equipment was added to the stern. Upon completion of the work in May 2010 takes the name Nissos Rodos. It is subsequently assigned from June onwards to the Aegean Sea between Piraeus and the Cyclades.

At the end of the month of February 2011 Nissos Rodos was chartered to evacuate foreign nationals from Libya, which was in the throes of a civil war. The ship made its first voyage from Piraeus to Benghazi, where 2,400 people were evacuated. It would make a second voyage from February 28 to March 5.

Between September 2012 and May 2013 the ship was chartered by the Turkish government and sailed between Alexandretta and Damietta, Egypt. After being returned to Hellenic Seaways, it was laid up during the summer before resuming service between Greece and Italy in September. On December 27, 2015, Nissos Rodos suffered engine trouble shortly after leaving Piraeus for Samos. After returning to port, it was laid up for repairs and then put back into service a few weeks later.

== Facilities ==
Nissos Rodos has eight decks. While the ship actually spans ten decks, two are absent, serving as car decks to allow for cargo transport. Commercially, the decks were named alphabetically from highest to lowest during the ship's Japanese period. They are now numbered 1 through 10, reflecting the absence of decks 4 and 6. Passenger quarters occupy decks 7, 8, and 9, while decks 9 and 10 are partially reserved for crew. Decks 1, 2, 3, and 5 house the car decks.

=== Common areas ===
Upon its entry into service, Kiso offered the most comfortable accommodations on any ferry in Japan. Most of the facilities were located on B Deck, where passengers had access to the "Mermaid Club" bar, the "Windsor House" restaurant, and the "Aurora" lounge. These areas, adorned with luxurious and elegant décor, were connected by a long glass-enclosed corridor overlooking the sea. This design was later adopted by other shipping companies in the archipelago, notably the Shin Nihonkai Ferry Company.

In addition to these main amenities, the ship also offered a shopping arcade on deck B and a small forward lounge open to the sea on deck A, as well as a solarium. On deck C, there were two public baths (called sentō ), one for men on the port side and the other for women on the starboard side, as well as a cinema and an arcade.

Following its acquisition by Hellenic Seaways, the ship's decor was modernized several times, but its layout remained relatively unchanged. On deck 7, the truck drivers' dormitories and the two sentō (public baths) were demolished and replaced with lounges. In 2016, a veranda was added to the aft deck 8.

Currently, the facilities aboard Nissos Rodos are organized as follows:

- Mandraki Foyer: the ship's main bar located on deck 8 at the atrium level;
- Lindos Self-Service: self-service restaurant located in the middle of deck 8;
- Kamiros Theter: bar-lounge at the rear of deck 8;
- Rodini Grill Bar: outdoor bar located in the middle of deck 9;
- Castello Lounge: lounge located on deck 7 in the middle of the ship equipped with armchairs and a small bar; and
- Ialyssos Lounge: another lounge with armchairs located behind the first one at the reception level.

=== Cabins ===
On board Kiso, cabins were classified into several categories according to the level of comfort. Mostly located at the front of the ship on decks B and C, they consisted of four suites, sixteen special rooms in Western style and two in Japanese style, 40 first-class rooms in Western, Japanese or mixed style and fifteen second- class dormitories.

Under the Greek flag, the cabin layout remained virtually unchanged, contrary to usual practice. All the first-class cabins were retained, although their decor was mostly modified, notably the former Japanese-style cabins. Most of the second-class dormitories were also replaced, with the exception of six located towards the rear.

== Features ==
Nissos Rodos is 192.51 m (631 ft 7 in) long and 27.01 m (88 ft 7 in) wide. Its tonnage was initially assessed at 13,730 gross tonnage (GT) (though this is not entirely accurate, as the tonnage of Japanese car ferries is defined using different criteria) before being increased to 31,084 GT following its 2010 refit. In its original configuration, it could carry 850 passengers and 110 vehicles in a spacious garage accessible via five ramp doors: two lateral doors on either side at the stern, one at the starboard bow, and two axial doors at the front and rear. After its acquisition by Hellenic Seaways, its capacity was increased to 1,600 passengers and 472 vehicles. Nissos Rodos is powered by two Mitsubishi-MAN 8L58/64 diesel engines producing 28,800 hp (21,500 kW), driving two propellers that propel the vessel at a speed of 23 knots (43 km/h; 26 mph). It is also equipped with a bow thruster and a roll stabilizer. The original safety equipment consisted primarily of life rafts and a rigid inflatable rescue boat (RIB). Following the 2010 refit, four medium-sized lifeboats were added to the safety system.

== Route served ==
At the beginning of its career, Kiso operated year-round on the Nagoya–Sendai–Tomakomai route between Honshū and Hokkaidō until 2005.

From 2005, the car ferry operated Hellenic Seaways routes between Greece and Italy on the Corinth–Venice route. It also sailed under charter to Grimaldi Lines between Italy and Spain on the Genoa–Barcelona route until 2007. Returning to Hellenic Seaways, it was assigned periodically to serve the Cyclades or the Corinth - Porto Marghera route. It also served between September 2012 and May 2013 between Turkey and Egypt on the Alexandretta and Damietta line.

The ship is currently used on seasonal routes between Piraeus and the islands of Paros, Kos, and Rhodes. It is also sometimes used on routes connecting Piraeus to Crete, replacing ships of Blue Star Ferries and, more recently, ANEK Lines.

== Accidents and Incidents ==
=== 2015 collision with Seabourn Odyssey (Mykonos) ===
On August 6, 2015, the ro-ro passenger ferry Nissos Rodos allided with the cruise ship Seabourn Odyssey at the port of Mykonos, Greece. The Nissos Rodos had just arrived from Ermoupolis and was performing a docking maneuver when it struck the berthed cruise vessel. Port authorities inspected both ships and determined that they had sustained only minor damage. No injuries, environmental pollution, or major structural issues were reported, and both vessels were cleared to resume their respective voyages.

==== 2022 collision (Heraklion) ====
On 9 February 2022, during the morning hours, the vessel struck Pier 1 at the port of Heraklion during docking maneuvers. The ship was carrying 88 passengers, 62 cars, and 122 trucks.

The impact caused a three-meter deformation and paint abrasions on the outer hull of the starboard bow, roughly 1.7 meters above the waterline. Additionally, a 30-centimeter hull breach was discovered at the same height between the frames of the starboard ballast tank. All passengers and vehicles disembarked safely upon arrival, and no injuries or marine pollution were reported. The Central Port Authority of Heraklion detained the vessel until repairs could be completed and a certificate of seaworthiness maintenance was issued by its classification society.
