= Taiheiyō Ferry =

Passenger ferry based in Nagoya, Japan

Taiheiyō Ferry 太平洋フェリー
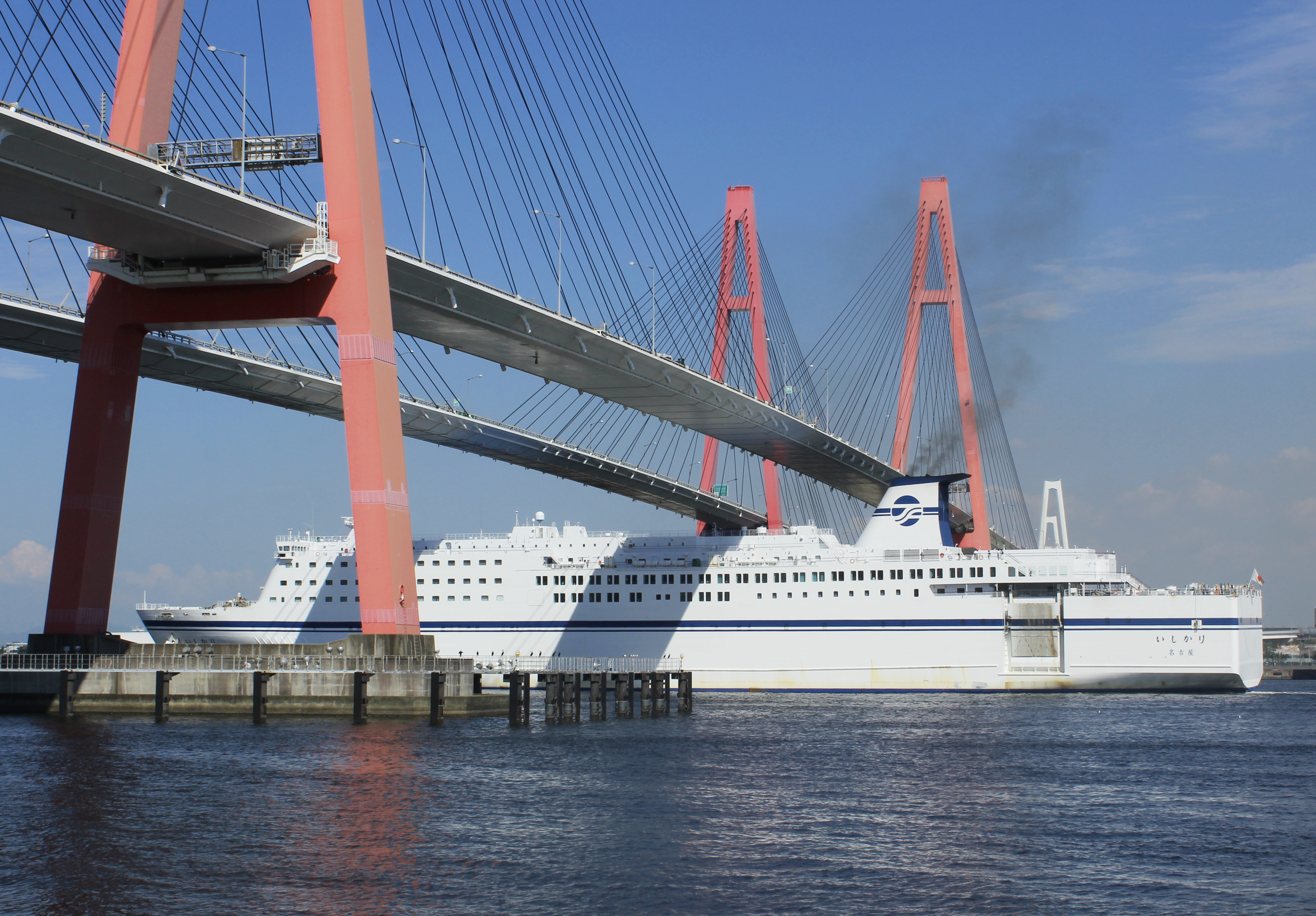
- The Ishikari under the Meiko Nishi Ohashi bridges
- Locale: Japan
- Transit type: Cruiseferry
- Began operation: October 20, 1970
- No. of lines: 1 (2 parts)
- No. of vessels: 3
- No. of terminals: 3
- Daily ridership: ~603 (2018)
- Website: www.taiheiyo-ferry.co.jp

Taiheiyō Ferry (太平洋フェリー, Taiheiyō Ferī; lit. 'Pacific Ferry') is a privately owned Japanese cruiseferry operator connecting the cities of Nagoya, Sendai, and Tomakomai. It is a subsidiary of the Nagoya-based Meitetsu Group, a group of companies that focuses primarily on rail transport in the Chūkyō metropolitan area.

== History ==
Taiheiyō Ferry was first founded as Taiheiyō Enkai Ferry (太平洋沿海フェリー, Pacific Coastal Ferry) in 1970, operating a line between Nagoya and Ōita City with the Arkas. A stop in Nachikatsuura, Wakayama was added on May 3, 1975.

The current route between Nagoya, Sendai, and Tomakomai began in 1973.

In 1982, the Meitetsu Group acquired the Taiheiyō Enkai Ferry and renamed it to its current name.

== Routes ==
Taiheiyō Ferry operates a single regular route between Nagoya, Sendai, and Tomakomai. Ships operate every day between Sendai and Tomakomai, and every other day between Nagoya and Sendai. Out of the three ships the company operates, only the Kiso and Ishikari stop at Nagoya. The company also operates seasonal routes to Ise Bay, Kōchi, Okinawa, and the Bonin Islands.

The 1,330 km Nagoya–Sendai–Tomakomai route, running between Central Japan and Hokkaido, takes approximately 40 hours and is the longest domestic ferry route in Japan.

== Fleet ==
=== Current fleet ===
Taiheiyō Ferry has operated a total of twelve ships, three of which are in operation: the Kiso, Ishikari, and Kitakami, which are named after the Kiso, Ishikari, and Kitakami rivers, respectively. The names are chosen to represent each region (Chūbu, Hokkaido, and Tōhoku) that the ferry serves.

All ships are equipped with dining rooms and rooms for lodging.

Ship	Built	Builder	Gross Tonage	Length	Width	Passengers	Vehicles	Image
Kiso (2nd generation)	July 2004	Mitsubishi Heavy Industries; Shimonoseki Shipyard	15,795 tons	199.9 m	27.0 m	800 people	113 passenger cars 188 trucks	
Ishikari (3rd generation)	March 2011	Mitsubishi Heavy Industries; Shimonoseki Shipyard	15,762 tons	199.9 m	27.0 m	783 people	100 passenger cars 189 trucks	
Kitakami (2nd generation)	January 2019	Mitsubishi Heavy Industries; Shimonoseki Shipyard	13,694 tons	192.5 m	27.0 m	535 people	146 passenger cars 166 trucks	

=== Former fleet ===
Ship	Builder	Entered service	Left service	Notes
Arkas	Setoda Shipyard	1972	1987	Sold to Strintzis Lines
Albireo	Setoda Shipyard	1973	1989	Sold to Strintzis Lines
Alnasl	NHI Corporation; Toyama Shipyard	1973	1975	Sold to Nihon Car Ferry
Argo	NHI Corporation; Toyama Shipyard	1973	1980	Sold to Kansai Kisen
Ishikari (1st generation)	Naikai Zosen Corporation; Setoda Shipyard	1975	1991	Sold to Strintzis Lines
Daisetsu	Naikai Zosen Corporation; Setoda Shipyard	1975	1985	Sold to Higashi Nihon Ferry
Kiso (1st generation)	Mitsubishi Heavy Industries; Shimonoseki Shipyard	1987	2004	Sold to Hellenic Seaways
Ishikari (2nd generation)	Mitsubishi Heavy Industries; Kobe Shipyard	1989	2011	Sold to Golden Spring Enterprise
Kitakami (1st generation)	Mitsubishi Heavy Industries; Shimonoseki Shipyard	1989	2019	Scrapped

== Incidents ==
During the 2011 Tōhoku earthquake, the Kitakami (1st generation) was moored at Sendai. The Kitakami managed to escape to sea before the ensuing tsunami, but Taiheiyō Ferry's terminal was heavily damaged along with the rest of the Port of Sendai. 123 cars belonging to the company and most of the equipment on shore were lost. Regular services to Sendai resumed on June 5, and repairs to the terminal building were completed on July 8.
