= Asterion II =

Greek ferry

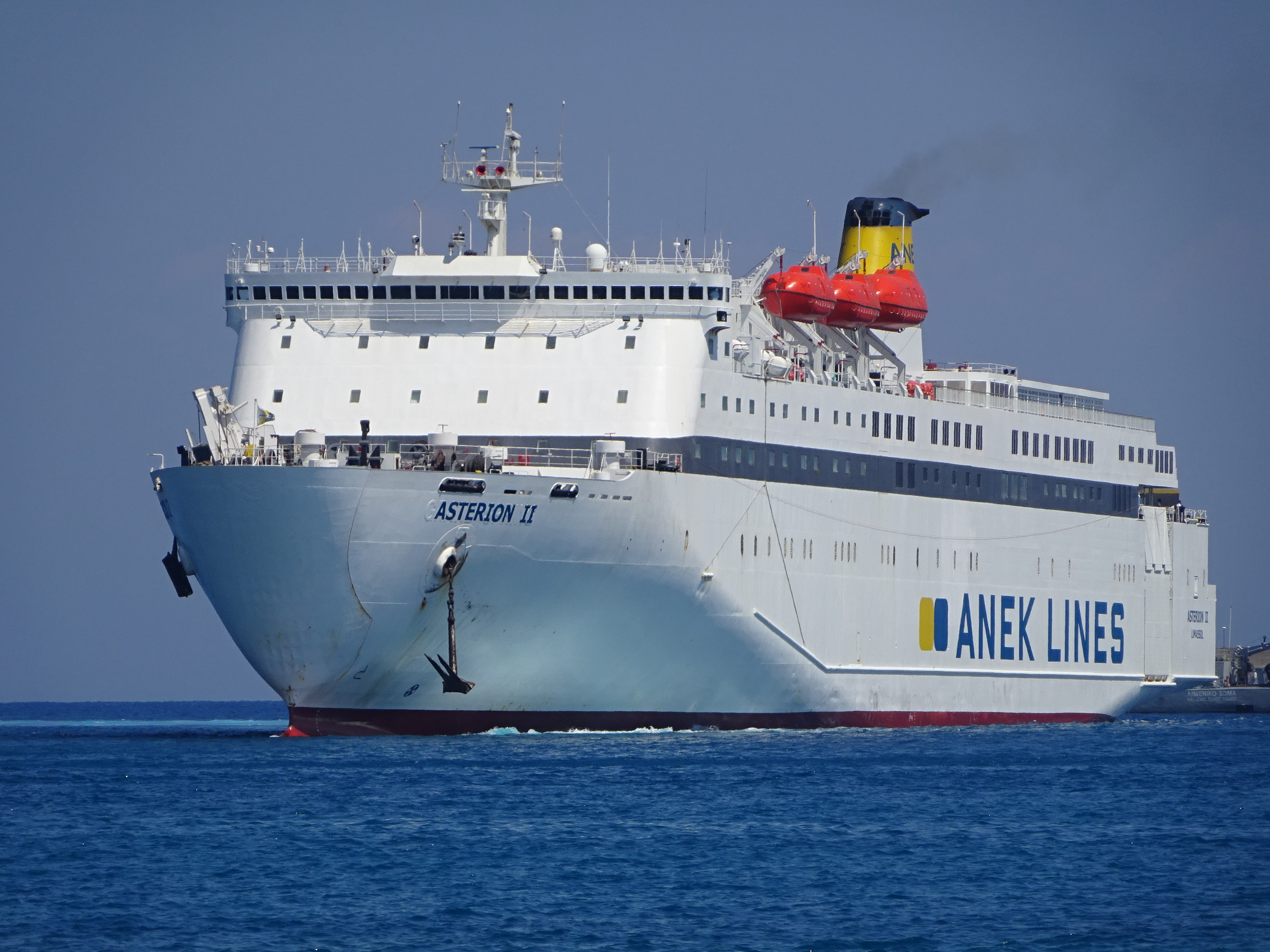
- Asterion II entering Rhodes port.

History

Cyprus
- Name: Ishikari (1990–2011); Grand Spring (2011–2018); Asterion II (2018–Present)
- Namesake: Asterion of Crete
- Owner: Alphaglobe Shipping Ltd, Limassol, Cyprus
- Operator: ANEK Lines (2018–2022, 2024-); Superfast Ferries (2022–2024)
- Port of registry: 1991–2011: Nagoya, Japan; 2011–2016: Panama City, Panama; 2016–2018: Freetown, Sierra Leone; 2018 onwards: Limassol, Cyprus
- Route: Piraeus–Heraklion
- Builder: Mitsubishi Heavy Industries, Kobe, Japan
- Yard number: 1183
- Laid down: 3 July 1990
- Launched: 8 November 1990
- Completed: 18 March 1991
- Maiden voyage: March 1991
- In service: 1991
- Identification: Call sign 5BYX4; IMO number: 8922163; MMSI number: 209262000
- Status: In service

General characteristics
- Type: Ro-pax ferry
- Tonnage: 31,804 GT Summer 6,368 DWT
- Length: 192 m (629 ft 11 in)
- Beam: 27 m (88 ft 7 in)
- Height: 6.7 m (22 ft 0 in)
- Draught: 6.6 m (22 ft)
- Ramps: Three (one in the stern, two on the starboard side)
- Speed: 23 knots (43 km/h; 26 mph) (max)

Asterion II is a ro-ro/passenger ferry, built in 1991 at Mitsubishi Heavy Industries at Kobe, Japan, and put into service by ANEK in 2018 (previously operated under different names and owners). She holds a total of 720 passengers, 840 cars and 117 trucks and has 451 beds for passengers. She has two 14-cyl MAN-B&W-Mitsubishi 14V52/55B engines, with combined power of 18,460 kW and reaches speeds of up to 22 knots. She was named after Asterion of Crete, a mythical king of Crete and has the flag of Cyprus, making it the only ship of the fleet with a non-Greek flag. It also features 3 Daihatsu 6DL-28 electric engines of 1,800 ps each (5,400ps) and 3 1500KVA FEK55E-10 generators. The ship belongs to the Sing-Lloyd class.

== History ==
=== 1990–2011: construction and first years ===
The ship was built by Mitsubishi Heavy Industries, Kobe, Japan. She was launched on 8 November 1990. The ship was originally named Ishikari after a river in Hokkaido and had to replace an older ship named Ishikari, who was sold in Strintzis Lines by 1990. 7. Delivered on 18 March 1998 at Taiheiyō Ferry (Pacific Ferry Co). She was routed on the line Nagoya - Sendai - Tomakomai, but was also used as a cruiser on the Ogasawara islands.

=== 2010–2018: Weihai Ferry ===
In March 2011, she was sold to Golden Spring Enterprise, Panama and Chinese Wanfang International Shipmanagement and renamed to GRAND SPRING for an amount of $8 million. After its purchase, modernization and maintenance works took place. At this time, she was routed on Wehai-Pyoengtaek line, connecting China with South Korea, before moving to Great Promise Industrial HK, Panama in February 2012. In 2015, she was laid up in Weihai, China and in February 2016 she raised the Sierra Leone flag, with Freetown being its homeport. At this time, South Korean Gwangyang Line planned to route her in the Gwangyang-Shimonosheki line, connecting South Korea with Japan. However, the project failed and the ship was completely abandoned.

=== 2018–present: Cyprus ===
In March 2018, she was sold to Alphaglobe Shipping of Limassol, Cyprus, with management by ANEK Lines and renamed Asterion II, before being repaired and refurbished by Naval Works Voudouris at Perama. Once most of the work was completed, the ship was drydocked and painted in the ANEK LINES livery. On 18 June the ship departed for the port of Patras where for a few days, the retrofit continued. On 28 June, after a few postponements, it went into service replacing Asterion, which was chartered from Brittany Ferries, and Elyros.

== Route ==
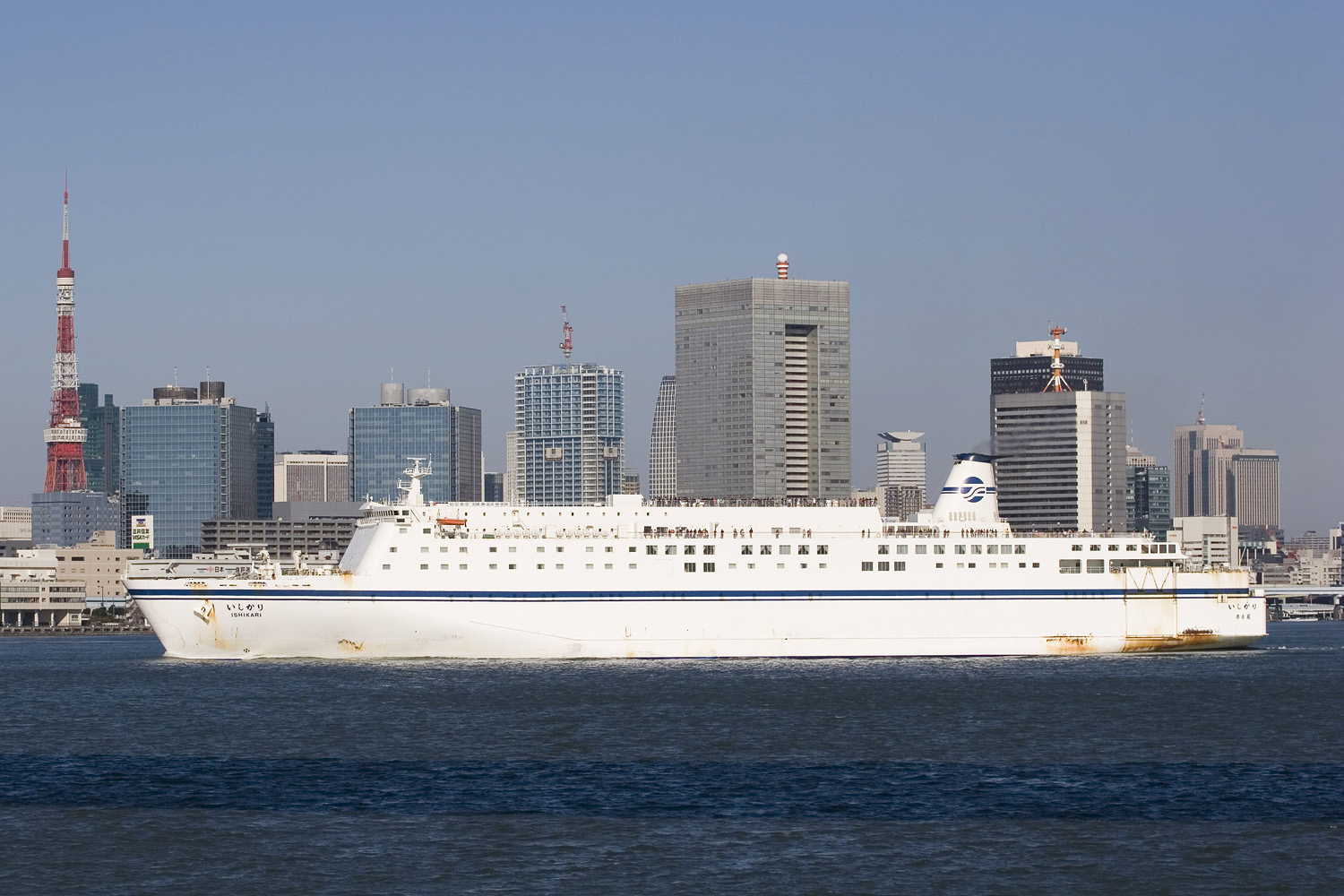
Asterion II as Ishikari in Japan (2006).

Asterion II serves the ferry line Piraeus-Heraklion.
