= Mihara (surname) =

Mihara (written: 三原) is a Japanese surname. Notable people with the surname include:

- Asahiko Mihara (三原 朝彦; born 1947), Japanese politician
- Hiroki Mihara (三原 廣樹; born 1978), Japanese footballer
- Hiroshi Mihara (三原 弘嗣; born 1983), better known as Hiroshi Yamato, Japanese professional wrestler
- Jun Mihara (三原純; born 1981), football referee
- Junko Mihara (三原 じゅん子; born 1964), Japanese politician, singer and actress
- Kohei Mihara (三原 向平; born 1989), Japanese footballer
- Mai Mihara (三原 舞依; born 1999), Japanese figure skater
- Makihito Mihara (三原 槙仁), Japanese Magic: the Gathering player
- Masato Mihara (三原 正人; born 1959), Japanese judoka
- Masatoshi Mihara (三原 雅俊; born 1988), Japanese footballer
- Mitsuhiro Mihara (三原 光尋; born 1964), Japanese film director
- Mitsukazu Mihara (三原 ミツカズ; born 1970), Japanese manga artist
- Puti Kaisar Mihara (born 1986), Austrian model
- Tadashi Mihara (三原 正; born 1955), Japanese boxer
- Yōko Mihara (三原 葉子; 1933–2013), Japanese actress
- Yūki Mihara (三原 勇希; born 1990), Japanese model and gravure idol
- Nathan Mihara, Associate Justice of the California Courts of Appeal, 6th District
