= Algérie Ferries =

Algerian shipping company

- Industry: Shipping
- Founded: 1987
- Headquarters: Algiers, Algeria
- Area served: Mediterranean Sea
- Services: Passenger transportation Freight transportation
- Website: algerieferries.dz

Algérie Ferries (Arabic: النقل البحري الجزائري) or Entreprise Nationale de Transport Maritime de Voyageurs (ENTMV) (Arabic: المؤسسة الوطنية للنقل البحري للمسافرين) is a state-owned Algerian shipping company. The company operates passenger and freight services between Algeria, France and Spain.

== Routes ==
Algérie Ferries operates eight routes across the Mediterranean Sea.

- Oran - Alicante
- Oran - Marseille
- Algiers - Alicante
- Algiers - Barcelona
- Algiers - Marseille
- Béjaïa - Marseille
- Skikda - Marseille
- Annaba - Marseille

== Fleet ==
Algérie Ferries operates a fleet of five passenger / car ferries:

Ship	Flag	Entered service	Entered fleet	Length (m)	Beam (m)	Tonnage	Passengers	Service speed	Notes
Tariq Ibn Ziyad	Algeria	1995		153,3	25,2	21,659 GT	1,276	21 knots	
Tassili II	Algeria	2004		146,6	24	20,124 GT	1,320	23.5 knots	
El Djazair II	Algeria	2005		146,6	24	20,124 GT	1,320	23.5 knots	
Badji-Mokhtar III	Algeria	2021		200	30	49,785 GT	1,800	24 knots	

== Scandal ==
On June 2, 2022, CEO Kamel Issad was dismissed from his position due to "his behavior that undermined the image of Algeria and was detrimental to the interests of citizens".

On January 19, 2023, Kamel Issad was sentenced to six years in prison for mismanagement and lack of maintenance of the company's vessels. He was arrested a few days after being dismissed in June 2022 on charges of "misappropriation of public funds, abuse of power, and illicit enrichment." Other former executives were also convicted in this case. Former commercial director Karim Bouzenad received a five-year prison sentence. Hamouche Aghiles and Oufar Malika, both fugitives, were each sentenced to ten years in prison and are subject to an international arrest warrant.

On May 28, 2023, the Court of Algiers confirmed the sentences handed down in the first instance in the ENTMV case. Kamel Issad was sentenced to six years in prison, Karim Bouzenad, former commercial director, to five years in prison, and Fatma Laimchi, responsible for information systems, to one year of suspended sentence. The charges included misappropriation of public funds, abuse of power, and illicit enrichment. Kamel Eddalia and Cherifi Ikbal were acquitted.
