= List of ship decommissionings in 1989 =

The list of ship decommissionings in 1989 includes a chronological list of all ships decommissioned in 1989.

| | Operator | Ship | Flag | Class and type | Fate | Other notes |
|---|---|---|---|---|---|---|
| 31 January | United States Navy | Garcia | | Garcia-class frigate | Leased to the Pakistan Navy | Renamed Siaf (F264) |
| January | Vaasanlaivat-Vasabåtarna | Botnia Express | Finland | Ferry | Chartered to Sally Line | |
| 31 March | Royal Navy | Euryalus | | Leander-class frigate | Decommissioned | Sold as scrap in 1990 |
| March | Sally Line | Botnia Express | Finland | Ferry | Returned to Vaasanlaivat-Vasabåtarna traffic | |
| 4 April | Royal Navy | Arethusa | | Leander-class frigate | Decommissioned | Sunk as target in 1991 |
| 4 July | German Navy | Braunschweig | | | Sold to Turkish Navy | Renamed Gemlik (D361) |
| August | Spanish Navy | Dédalo | | | Officially stricken | |
| August | Bolivarian Navy of Venezuela | Tiburon | | Balao-class submarine | Scrapped | |
| 2 October | Olau Line | Olau Hollandia | Germany | Cruiseferry | Sold to Nordström & Thulin | Renamed Nord Gotlandia for Gotlandslinjen traffic |
| 12 October | Chandris Fantasy Cruises | Galileo | Panama | Cruise ship | Rebuilt, transferred to Celebrity Cruises | Renamed Meridian |
| 11 November | Vaasanlaivat-Vasabåtarna | Botnia Express | Finland | Ferry | Chartered to Jakob Lines | |
| 23 November | Lion Ferry | Lion Queen | Sweden | Ferry | Rebuilt for Stena Line's Canadian operations | Renamed Crown Princess Victoria |
| Date unknown (prior to December) | Sea Containers | Orient Express | Bermuda | Cruise ship | Chartered to Europe Cruise Line | Renamed Eurosun; Sold to Europe Cruise Line in December |
| Date unknown | Kefalliniki Sa | Ainos | Greece | Ferry | Sold to Sigma Ferries | Renamed Neraida II |
