= MS Silja Star =

MS Silja Star has been the name of two ships in Silja Line traffic:

- MS Silja Star (1), sailed for Silja Line 1980–1986. Now MS Arberia for Ilion Lines
- MS Silja Star (2), sailed for Silja Line 1990. Sunk 1994 as MS Estonia
