= MV Roslagen =

MV Roslagen may refer to:

- MV Roslagen (1970), a car ferry that operated with the Botnia Express between Sweden and Finland, in the period 1988 to 2007
- MV Roslagen (1977), a passenger ferry operating in the Stockholm archipelago, Sweden
