= MS Rahal =

Ship built in 1972

MS Diana
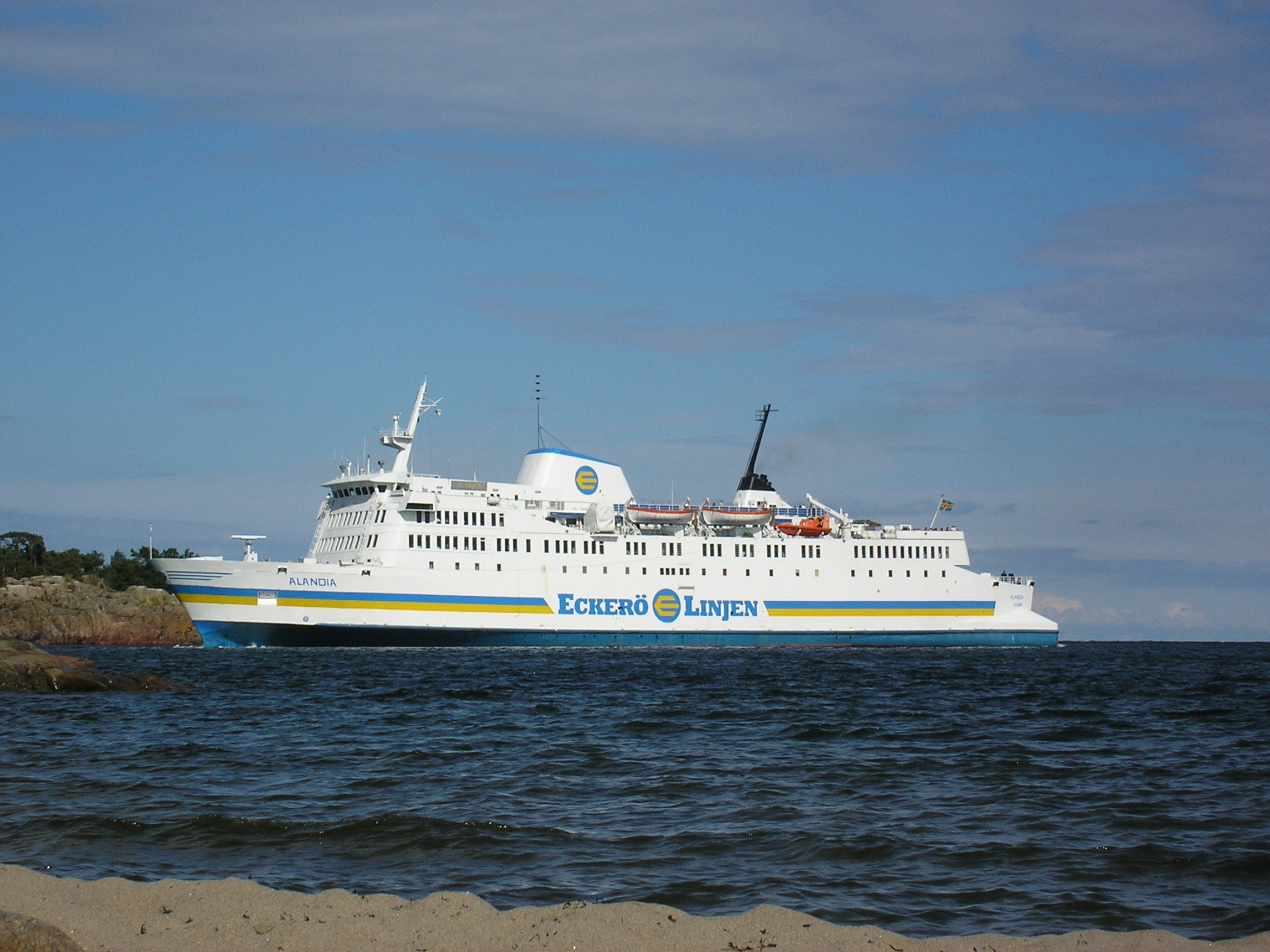
- MS Alandia

History
- Name: 1972–1979: Diana; 1979–1992: Botnia Express; 1992–2006: Alandia; 2006–2015: Jamaa II; 2015–2021: Rahal
- Owner: 1972–1979: Rederi AB Slite; 1979–1989: Oy Vaasa-Umeå Ab; 1989–1991: Partrederi Botnia Express; 1991–1992: Effdo 3; 1992–2006: Eckerö Linjen; 2006–2015: Bayway Shipping Co; 2015–2021: Horizon Worldwide Trading
- Operator: 1972–1979: Viking Line; 1979–1989: Oy Vaasa-Umeå Ab; 1989–1989: Sally Line UK; 1989–1989: Vaasanlaivat-Vasabåtarna; 1989–1990: Jakob Lines; 1990–1990: Baltic Line; 1992–1992: Eckerö Linjen; 1992–1992: Corona Line; 1992–2004: Eckerö Linjen; 2004–2005: RG Line; 2005–2015: Eckerö Linjen; 2006–2015: Bayway Shipping Co; 2015–2021: Horizon Worldwide Tranding
- Port of registry: 1972–1979: Slite, Sweden; 1979–1992: Vaasa, Finland; 1992–2006: Mariehamn, Åland; 2006–2019: San Lorenzo, Honduras; 2019-2021: Moroni, Comoros
- Ordered: 17 December 1970
- Builder: Meyer Werft, Papenburg, Germany
- Yard number: 566
- Laid down: 3 May 1972
- Launched: 28 August 1972
- Christened: 28 August 1972
- Completed: 1972
- Acquired: 11 November 1972
- Maiden voyage: 1972
- In service: 17 December 1972
- Out of service: 2021
- Identification: IMO number: 7224370; Call sign: HOMO
- Fate: Scrapped at Alang, India in 2021.

General characteristics (as built)
- Class & type: none
- Tonnage: 4,152 GRT; 1,110 DWT
- Length: 108.70 m (356.63 ft)
- Beam: 17.25 m (56.59 ft)
- Draught: 4.60 m (15.09 ft)
- Installed power: 2 × Klöckner-Humboldt-Deutz SBV 12M350; 5,968 kW (8,003 shp) (combined)
- Speed: 18.5 knots (34.3 km/h; 21.3 mph)
- Capacity: 1,200 passengers; 240 passenger berths; 265 cars

General characteristics (currently)
- Class & type: none
- Tonnage: 6,850 GT; 1,118 DWT
- Length: 108.67 m (356.53 ft)
- Beam: 18.90 m (62.01 ft)
- Draught: 4.60 m (15.09 ft)
- Capacity: 1,320 passengers; 100 passenger berths; 220 cars

MS Rahal was a car-passenger ferry owned by Bayway Shipping Co and sailing on the Red Sea. She was built in 1972 by Meyer Werft, Papenburg, Germany as Diana for Rederi AB Slite and later she was named Botnia Express, Alandia, Jamaa II and Rahal.

== History ==
=== Viking Line service ===
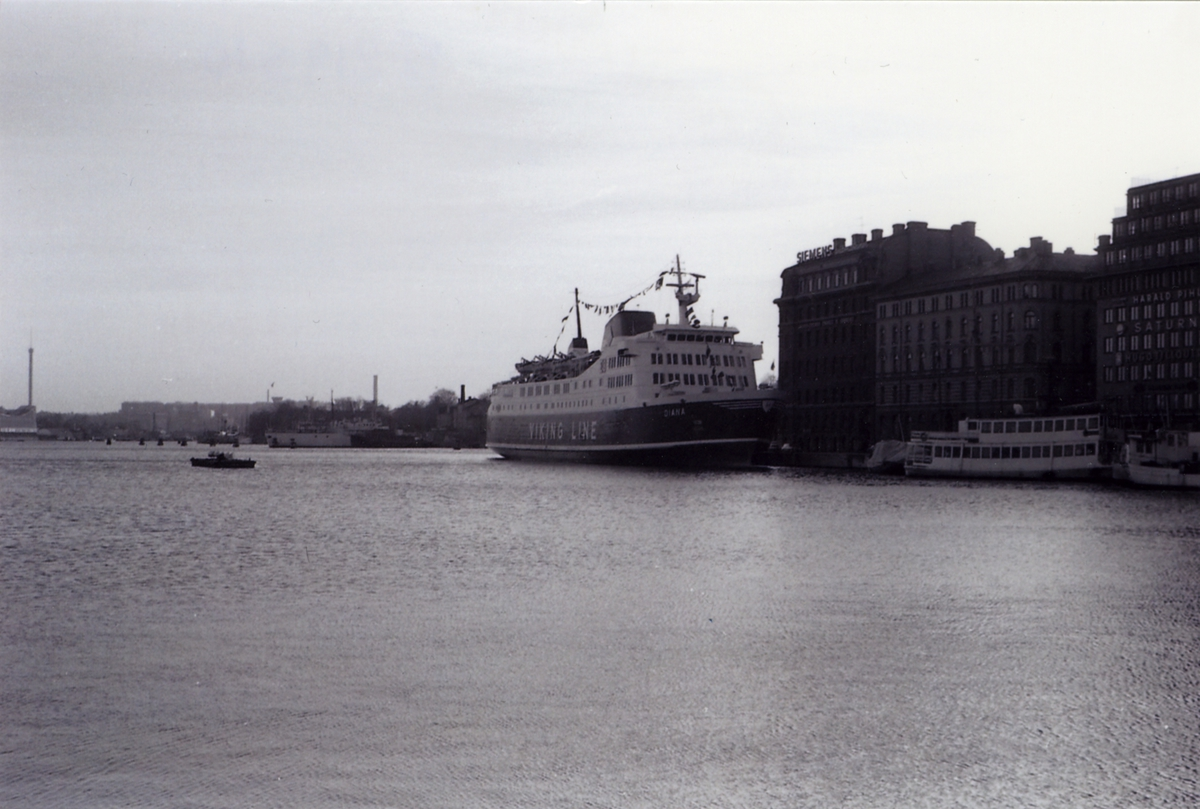
Diana on her maiden voyage at Stockholm in 1972

Diana was the fourth in a series of six near-identical sisters built between 1970 and 1974 for Rederi Ab Sally and Rederi AB Slite for use in Viking Line traffic (three further ships were built by the shipyard for Transbordadores, Mexico). These so-called Papenburg Sisters were highly influential in defining ferry traffic between Finland and Sweden. Although often officially listed as fully owned by Rederi AB Slite, Diana was actually owned jointly by Rederi Ab Volo, Rederi AB Slite, Simsonship Ab, Ivar Sund Lidingö and Ab Nils Thorwaldsson Saltsjöbaden.

When delivered in December 1972, Diana was initially set on a route connecting Naantali in Finland to Kapellskär in Sweden via Mariehamn in Åland. For the winter seasons 1973–1974, 1974–1975 and 1975–1976, she was transferred to the slightly longer Turku–Mariehamn–Stockholm route, but returned to the shorter route for summer's high season. From 1976 onwards to the end of her service with Viking Line she remained on the Naantali–Kapellskär service. On July 4, 1978 Diana was grounded near Mariehamn and started leaking oil. The following day her passengers were transferred onboard Kapella and freight onboard Travetal. On July 6 she managed to come loose and sailed to Finnboda dock, Nacka (near Stockholm), for repairs.

=== Vaasanlaivat service ===
In April 1979, Diana was sold to Oy Vaasa-Umeå Ab, Finland and renamed Botnia Express (2). However, she was chartered back to Rederi AB Slite until June 1979. Her final service for Viking Line was on the Turku–Mariehamn–Stockholm route between June 5 and June 15. On June 20 she began her service With Oy Vaasa-Umeå Ab, serving on routes connecting Vaasa, Finland to Sundsvall, Örnsköldsvik and Umeå in Sweden. Botnia Express was in fact the second Papenburg Sister to sail under Oy Vaasa-Umeå Ab's colours, already in 1976 the company had acquired her sister Wasa Express (2). In spring 1980 the ship was rebuilt at Rauma-Repola, Uusikaupunki, Finland with a new grill restaurant in the former rear sundeck. In June of the same year Oy Vaasa-Umeå Ab changed its name to Vaasanlaivat / Vasabåtarna.

In 1982 Vaasanlaivat was sold to Rederi Ab Sally, which led to a third Papenburg Sister joining the company's fleet for the years 1983–1984 when Sally Express sailed alongside her sisters. During the difficult winter 1984–1985 Botnia Express was caught in heavy ice twice, first in February when she had to be helped out by the Finnish icebreaker Tarmo and again in March. In 1987 Rederi Ab Sally was sold to Effoa and Johnson Line and hence Vaasanlaivat became owned by the same companies as Silja Line. In December 1988, Botnia Express was again caught in heavy ice, but was helped off by her fleetmate Fennia.

The last few years in Vaasanlaivat ownership Botnia Express spent mainly chartered to other companies. Between January and March 1989 the ship was chartered to Sally Ferries UK for Ramsgate–Dunkerque service. In November of the same year she was again chartered, this time to Vaasanlaivat's subsidiary Jakob Lines for traffic between Jakobstad, Finland and Skellefteå, Sweden under the trade name Polar Princess. After the end of that charter in March 1990, Botnia Express was chartered to Baltic Express Line for a planned service between Helsinki and Tallinn, but the service never materialised.

=== Eckerö Linjen and Eestin Linjat service ===
At the end of March 1990 the ship returned to Vaasa, where she was laid up (?) until February 1992, when she was sold to Eckerö Linjen, Finland, renamed Alandia and placed on their Eckerö (Finland) – Grisslehamn (Sweden) service. Here she again sailed with her old fleetmate from Viking Line and Vaasanlaivat days, the former Wasa Express which now sailed under the name Roslagen. Between March and June 1992 Alandia was chartered to Corona Line for Karlskrona (Sweden) – Gdynia (Poland) service. Often there were not enough passengers on the Eckerö–Grisslehamn route for two ships, and the Alandia spent sporadic times laid up, until Eckerö Line established a joint subsidiary Eestin Linjat with Birka Line for traffic on the fast-growing route between Helsinki and Tallinn in 1994. During the summer seasons of 1996 and 1997 Alandia returned to the Eckerö–Grisslehamn service. After 1998 when the new Nordlandia started service on the Helsinki–Tallinn route, Alandia returned full-time to the Eckerö–Grisslehamn route.

During 2003 and 2004 the ship returned to Helsinki–Tallinn service on a few occasions when the Nordlandia was being docked. During the 2004–2005 winter season Alandia was chartered to RG Line and returned to Vaasa–Umeå service when the company's normal ship Casino Express (Alandia's old fleetmate Fennia) was being repaired after being grounded near Umeå. After the end of that charter the ship returned to her normal Eckerö–Grisslehamn traffic. She briefly returned to Helsinki–Tallinn traffic again in September and October of the same year, after which she was laid up in Mariehamn. In April 2006 the ship was sold to Bayway Shipping Co., and in May of the same year she sailed to Stockholm where she was renamed Jamaa II and re-flagged in Honduras. Late in the same month she left for Greece for rebuilding at Agios Konstantinos. In September 2006 she finally began scheduled services from Jeddah, Saudi Arabia to various ports along the Red Sea. On 11 May 2007 the ship appeared to be on sale again. The ship was sold for scrap in 2021 and subsequently beached in Alang.
