= Eckerö Mail and Customs House =

Coordinates: 60.220325°N 19.543347°E

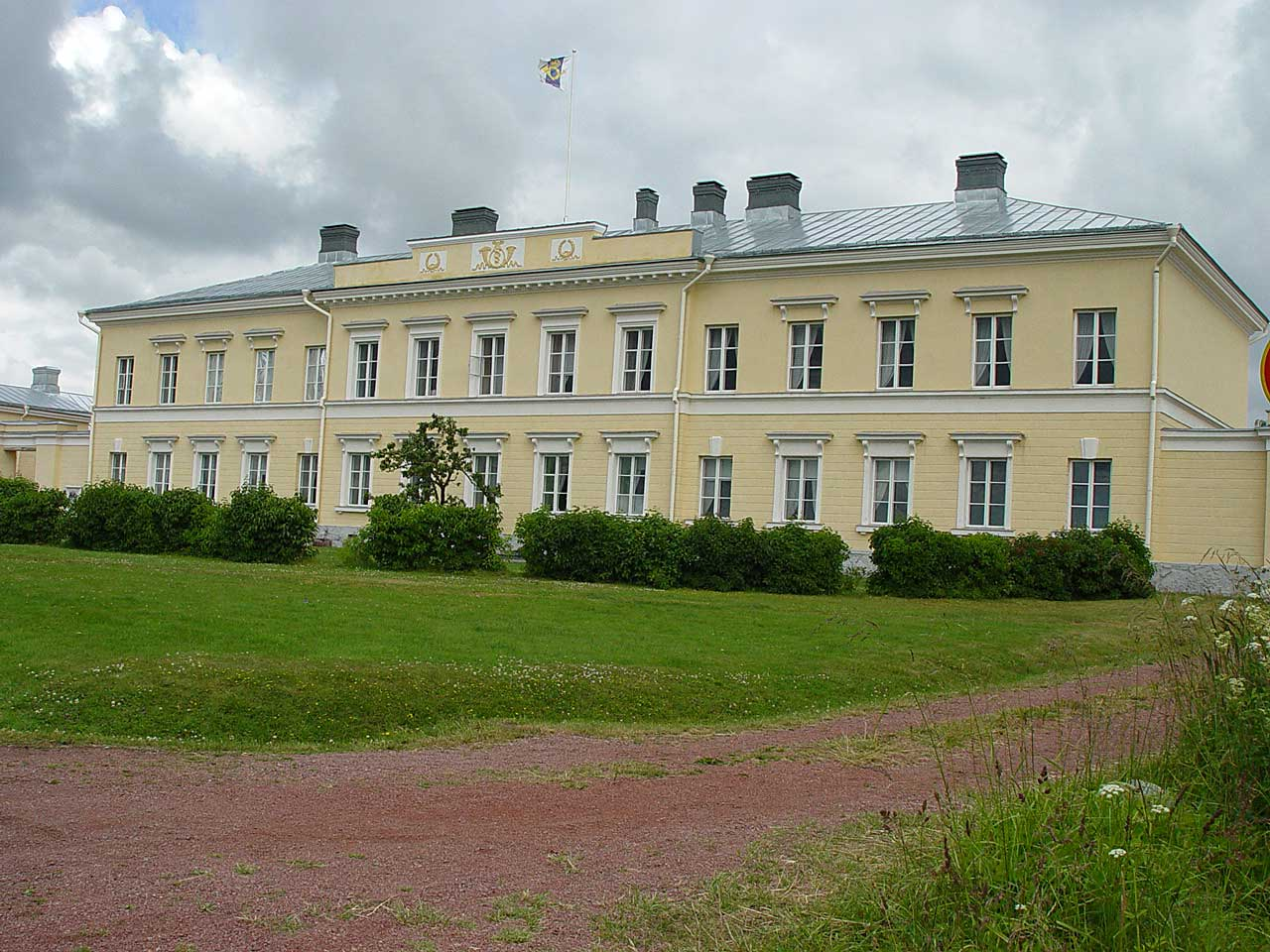
Eckerö Mail and Customs House.

Eckerö Mail and Customs House (Swedish: Eckerö post- och tullhus) is a historic building in Eckerö municipality in Åland, Finland.

It was built in 1828 as the most western posthouse on the Finnish side of the old mail route connecting Swedish capital Stockholm and Finnish town Turku. The building was drawn by architect Carl Ludvig Engel. Today it houses a postal museum and art gallery, and has an artist in residence program.

== History ==
In 1809 Finland had been taken over by Russia and it became an autonomous Grand Duchy in the Russian Empire. The new emperors wanted to indicate their might for the Swedes, as well as other seafarers, by creating a prestigious and oversized building that was highly visible from the sea. The posthouse was intentionally designed much too large for its need in a small village. Eckerö Mail and Customs House is four times bigger than the Grisslehamn Posthouse which is located on the Swedish side of the Sea of Åland.
