= Eckerö Linjen =

Finnish shipping company

Eckerö Linjen Ab
- Type: Aktiebolag
- Headquarters: Mariehamn, Åland
- Area served: Baltic Sea
- Services: Passenger transportation Freight transportation
- Website: www.eckerolinjen.ax

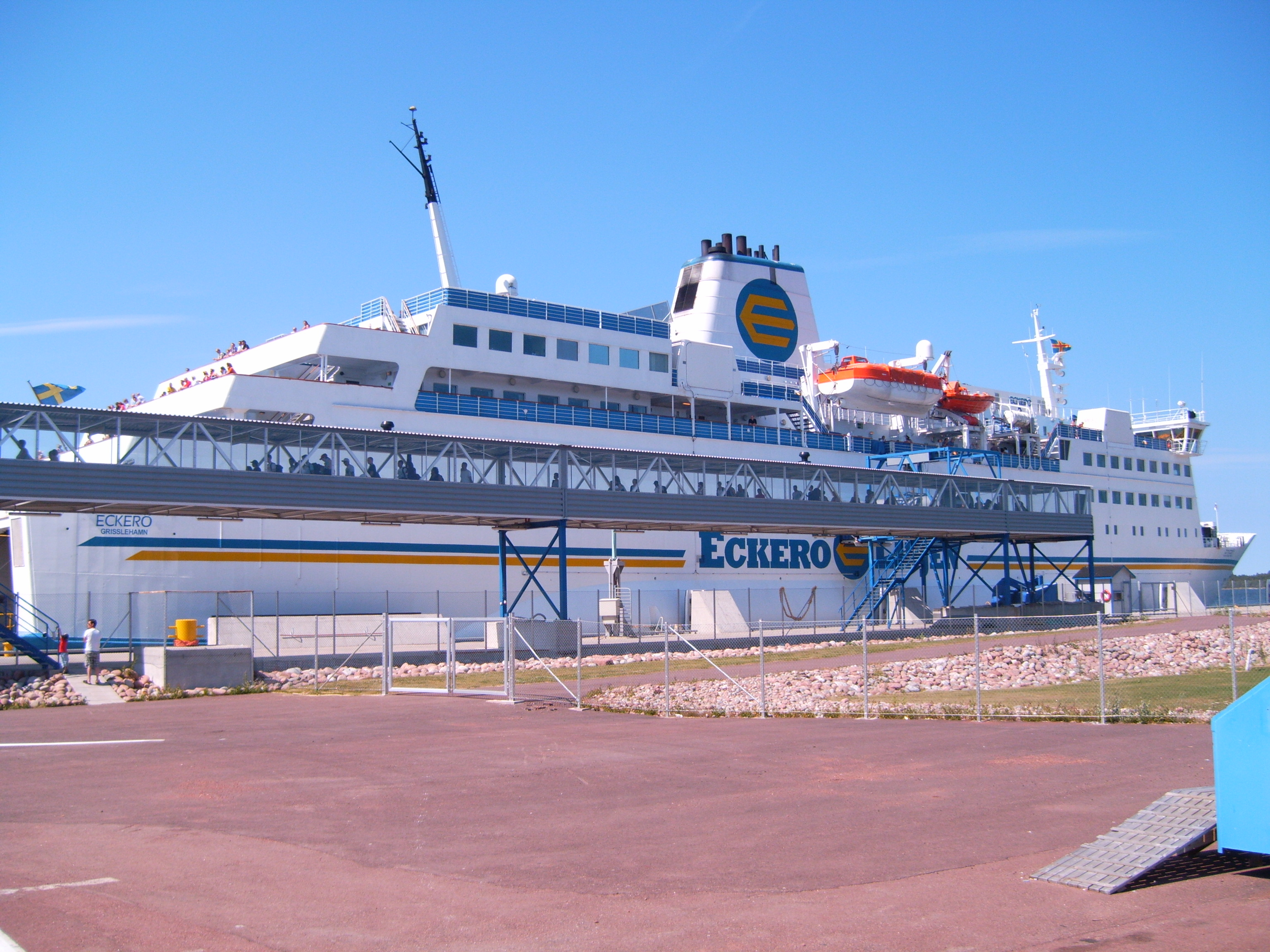
MS Eckerö

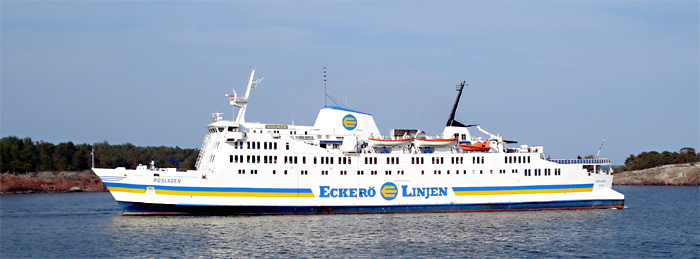
MS Roslagen

Eckerö Linjen is a Finnish shipping company operating a ferry between Berghamn harbour in Eckerö in the Åland Islands and Grisslehamn in Sweden. The company is owned by the Åland based Rederiaktiebolaget Eckerö. Eckerö Linjen should not be confused with its similarly named sister company Eckerö Line, which operates ferry services between Helsinki in Finland and Tallinn in Estonia.

== History ==
Eckerö Linjen began trafficking between Eckerö in Åland and Grisslehamn in Sweden in 1961. This route is much shorter than the one sailed by Viking Line, Eckerö Linjen's main competitor in the Åland - Sweden traffic, taking only two hours to cross. Partially as a result of this Eckerö Linjen operated its first two decades on small used ferries, until the acquisition of the first M/S Eckerö in 1982. Since January 2005 the route is operated by the second M/S Eckerö, a notably larger ship than the ones that have previously sailed on the line, with the second M/S Roslagen used as an extra ship during the summer high season. Viking, now holds the largest individual shareholder position with a 17.1% stake in Rederiaktiebolaget Eckerö (Rederi AB Eckerö), the parent company of Eckerö Linjen.

Although Eckerö Linjen and Eckerö Line are technically separate companies, ships from one company have often been used to cover for ships of the other during dockings and technical malfunctions.

== Fleet ==
=== Current fleet ===
Ship	Type	Built	Entered service	Gross tonnage	Passengers (max)	Knots	Route	Flag and home port	Image
MS Eckerö	Cruiseferry	1979	2005–	12,358 GT	1.500	20	Eckerö – Grisslehamn	Grisslehamn, Sweden	

== Former ships ==
- MS Alandia (1961–74)
- MS Alandia (1992–2006)
- MS Roslagen

== See also ==
- Eckerö Line
- Transport in Åland
