= Berghamn (Åland) =

Ferry port in Åland

Coordinates: 60.225°N 19.537°E

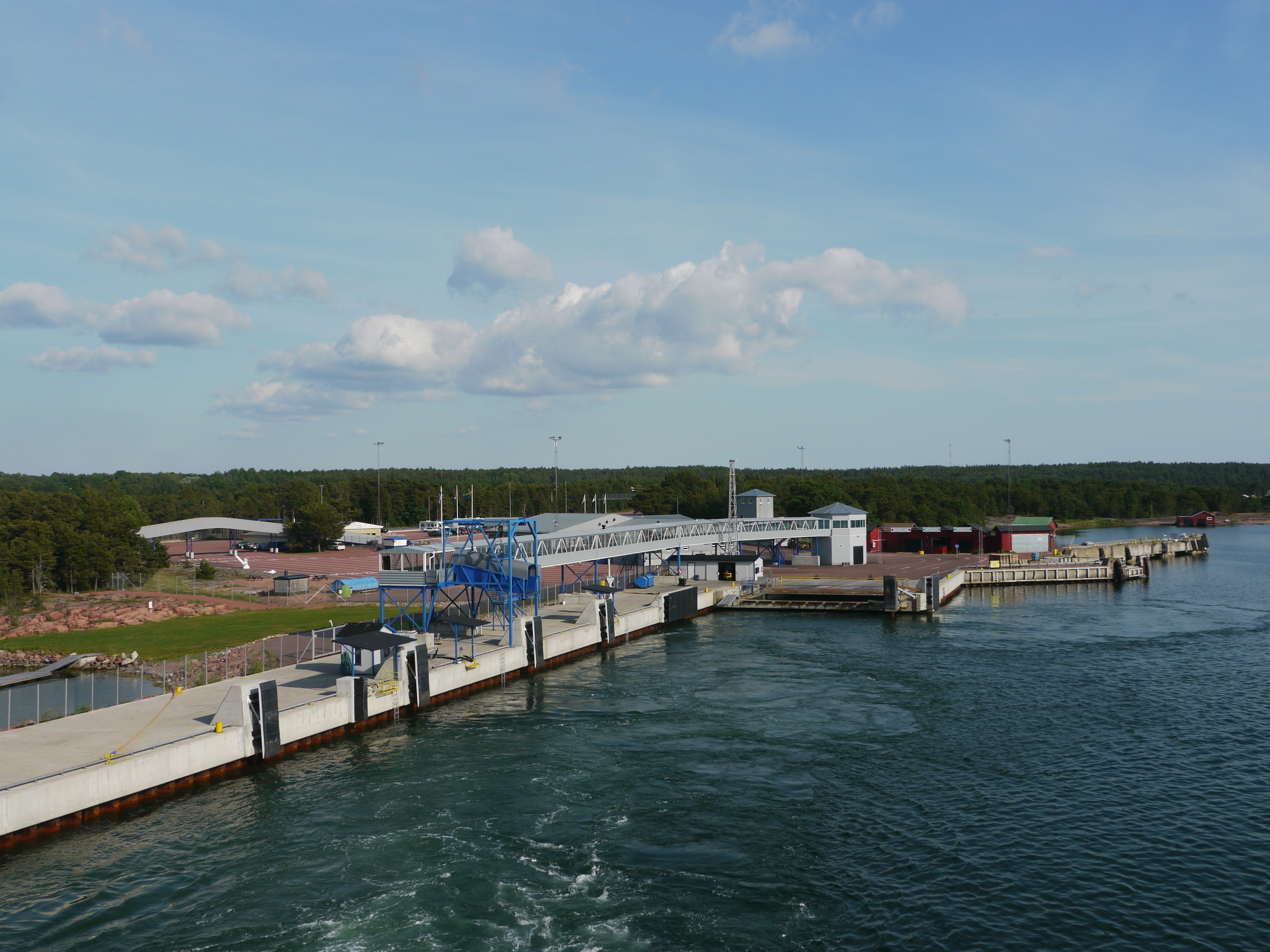
Berghamn, where the Eckerö Linjen ferry leaves for Sweden

Berghamn is the westernmost ferry harbour of the autonomous Finnish territory Åland, in the Archipelago Sea within the Baltic Sea. Berghamn is situated on the island of Eckerö.

Over the road, the harbour is about 35 km away from Åland's capital Mariehamn.

From this harbour, the ship company Eckerö Linjen has an international ferry link with Grisslehamn in Sweden. The ferry leaves several times a day. The crossing takes little less than 2 hours, crossing a time zone: seemingly, the crossing to Grisslehamn lasts only one hour, while going to Eckerö takes 3 hours.

There are only small villages near Berghamn, but several large sports facilities such as a golf course and an indoor sporting arena, Eckeröhallen.

== See also ==
- Ports of the Baltic Sea
