= GNV Azzurra =

Ship built in 1981

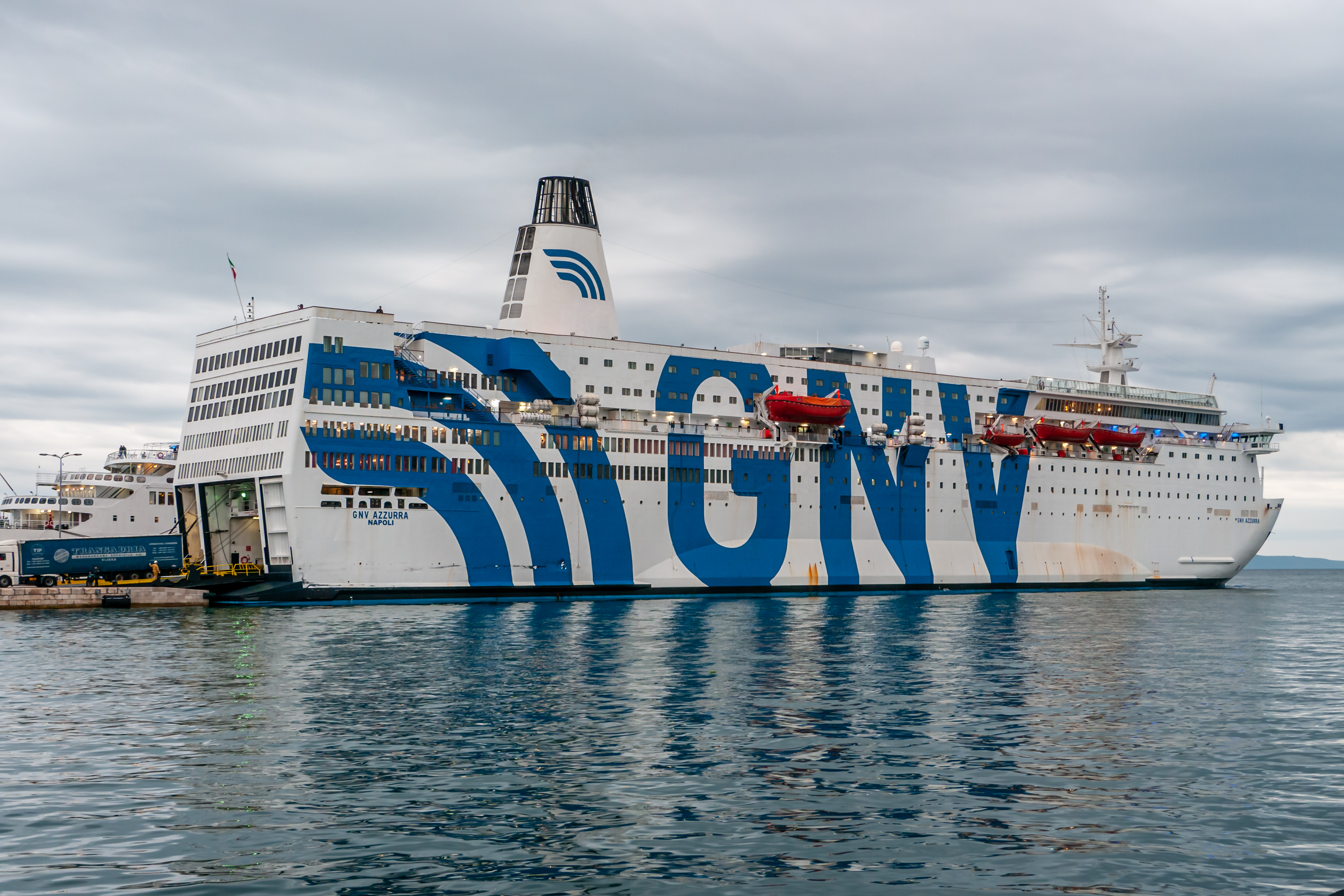
- MS GNV Azzurra docked in Split.

History
- Name: 1981: Gotland; 1981–1984: Wasa Star; 1984–2008: Peter Wessel; 2008–2017: SNAV Toscana; 2017-2026: GNV Azzurra
- Owner: 1981–1983: Rederi AB Gotland; 1983–1996: Larvik Line; 1996–2008: Color Line; 2008 onwards: Mediterranean Shipping Company
- Operator: 1981–1982: Vaasanlaivat-Vasabåtarna; 1983: Karageorgios Line; 1984–1996: Larvik Line; 1996–2008: Color Line; 2008–2013: SNAV; 2013-2026: GNV
- Port of registry: 1981–1983: Visby, Sweden; 1983–2008: Larvik, Norway; 2008-2026: Naples, Italy
- Ordered: October 1978
- Builder: Öresundsvarvet, Landskrona, Sweden
- Yard number: 279
- Laid down: 1 June 1980
- Launched: 1 November 1980
- Christened: 24 June 1981
- Acquired: 24 June 1981
- In service: 1 July 1981
- Identification: Call sign: ICKK; IMO number: 7826790; MMSI number: 247237700
- Status: Scrapped

General characteristics (as built)
- Class & type: Visby class cruiseferry
- Tonnage: 14,919 GRT; 2,410 t DWT
- Length: 142.32 m (466 ft 11 in)
- Beam: 24.52 m (80 ft 5 in)
- Draught: 5.51 m (18 ft 1 in)
- Decks: 11
- Ice class: 1 A
- Installed power: 4 × B&W 8K45GUC diesels; combined 21476 kW
- Propulsion: 2 propellers; 2 bow thrusters
- Speed: 21 kn (38.89 km/h; 24.17 mph)
- Capacity: 2072 passengers; 1142 berths; 510 cars

General characteristics (as rebuilt, 2003)
- Tonnage: 30,317 GT; 3,515 t DWT
- Length: 168.49 m (552 ft 9 in)
- Beam: 26.04 m (85 ft 5 in)
- Draught: 8.10 m (26 ft 7 in)
- Depth: 13.45 m (44 ft 2 in)
- Speed: 19 kn (35.19 km/h; 21.86 mph)
- Capacity: 2200 passengers; 1786 berths; 562 cars; 750 lanemeters
- Notes: Otherwise the same as built

MS GNV Azzurra was a cruiseferry owned by the Mediterranean Shipping Company and operated by the Italy-based SNAV. It was ordered from Öresundsvarvet in Landskrona, Sweden by Rederi AB Gotland as MS Gotland, but delivered as MS Wasa Star to Vaasanlaivat / Vasabåtarna. Between 1984 and 2008 she sailed as MS Peter Wessel for Larvik Line (until 1996) and Color Line, before being sold to her current owners.

== Concept and construction ==
In the late 1970s the Swedish shipbuilding industry was suffering from a downturn, with little to no ships in order from Swedish shipyards. To help the industry the Swedish Prime Minister Ola Ullsten persuaded Rederi AB Gotland to order new ferries from Öresundsvarvet in Landskrona. Although Rederi AB Gotland were reluctant to order new ships at first, in the end they decided to order two large, state-of-the-art ferries, capable of carrying over 2000 passengers. The first ship, MS Visby, was delivered on 10 October 1980. The second ship, planned to be called MS Gotland, was delivered on 24 June 1981 to Rederi Ab Gotland. However, there were not enough passengers in the traffic from Gotland to the Swedish mainland, on one day following her delivery the ship was chartered to Vaasanlaivat / Vasabåtarna, Finland and officially named MS Wasa Star.

== Service history ==
=== 1981–1983: Vaasanlaivat and Karageorgios Line ===
On 1 July 1981 the brand new Wasa Star started traffic on the route connecting Vaasa in Finland to Sundsvall in Sweden. At the time she was by far the largest ferry to have ever sailed in the Kvarken. In February 1982 the ship was moved to the Vaasa – Umeå route. On 14 February 1981 the ship was grounded near Holmsund. She soon came loose but her tanks were damaged, and the ship sailed to Helsinki for repairs. The local shipyard did not have a free drydock for the repairs and on 16 February 1981 the Wasa Star continued from Helsinki to Kiel, Germany where she was finally repaired at Howaldtswerke-Deutsche Werft.

On 1 April 1982 the Wasa Star returned to the Vaasa – Sundsvall route. She was not profitable however, and on 31 August 1982 she was taken out of traffic and laid up in Sundsvall. There she remained until May 1983, when Vaasanlaivat sub-chartered her to Karageorgios Line, Greece and she left Sundsvall for Valletta, Malta where she was docked in preparation for her new service. In June she started trafficking on a route connecting Patras, Greece to Ancona, Italy with one weekly trip from Ancona to Igoumenitsa, Greece. However, due to a payment dispute between Vaasanlaivat and Karageorgios Line Wasa Star's service in the Mediterranean remained short, and she sailed to Landskrona, Sweden to be laid up.

=== 1983–1996: Larvik Line ===
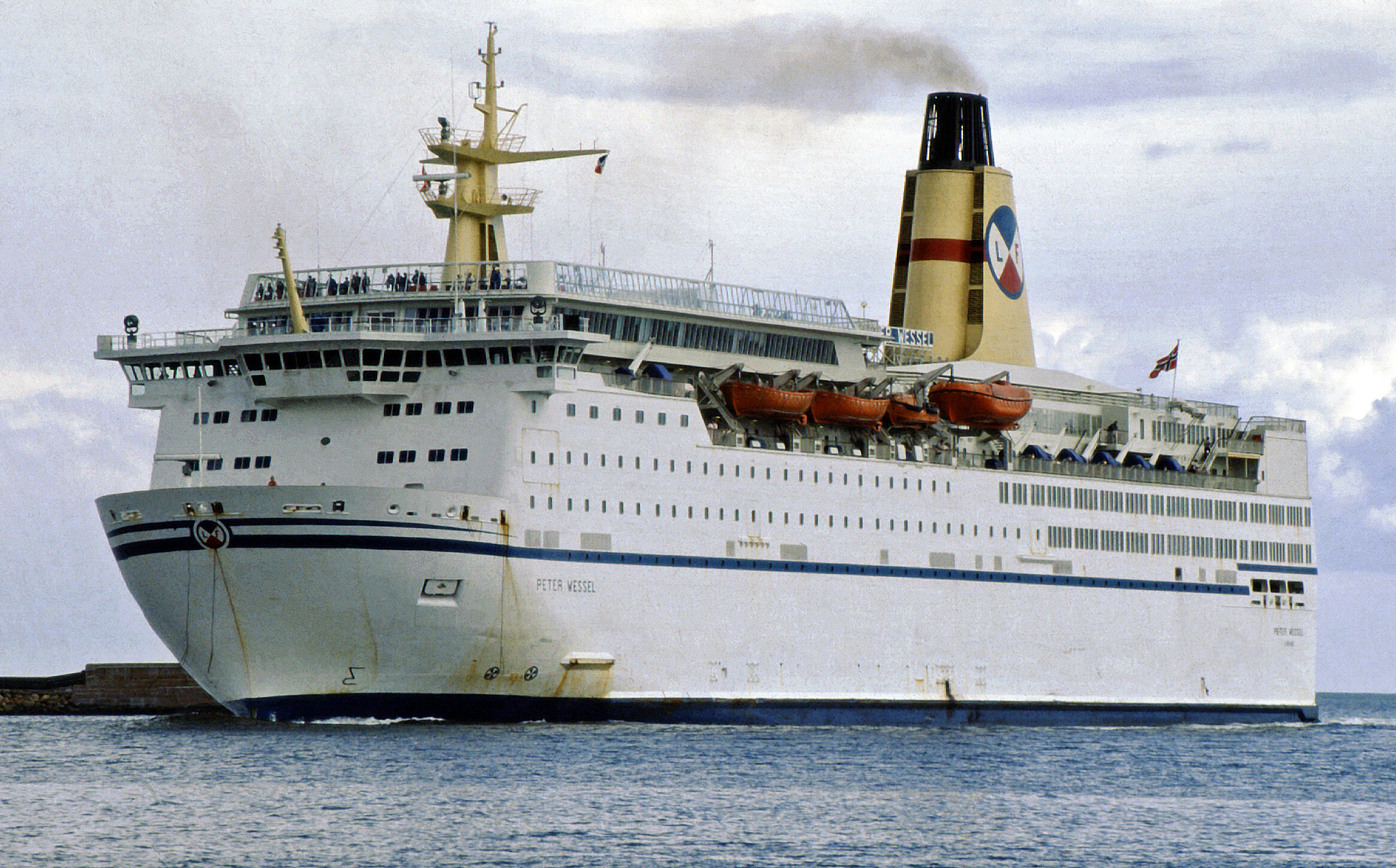
MS Peter Wessel 1985 before lengthening

On 29 August 1983, after the various conflicting charter agreements were resolved, the Wasa Star was sold to the Norwegian operator Larvik Line. She left Landskrona on 13 January 1984. In March of the same year she was renamed MS Peter Wessel, after Peter Wessel Tordenskiold and started operating on the Larvik–Frederikshavn route.

The Peter Wessel collided with MS Sydfjord on 27 June 1986. the Sydfjord sunk following the collision, and 3 of her crew were evacuated on board the Peter Wessel, among the dead was the captain and his family.

Peter Wessel was extended by 22.5 m (73 ft 10 in) meters at Blohm + Voss, Hamburg, Germany in 1988. Additional cabins were also built on the top of the ship.

=== 1996–2008: Color Line ===
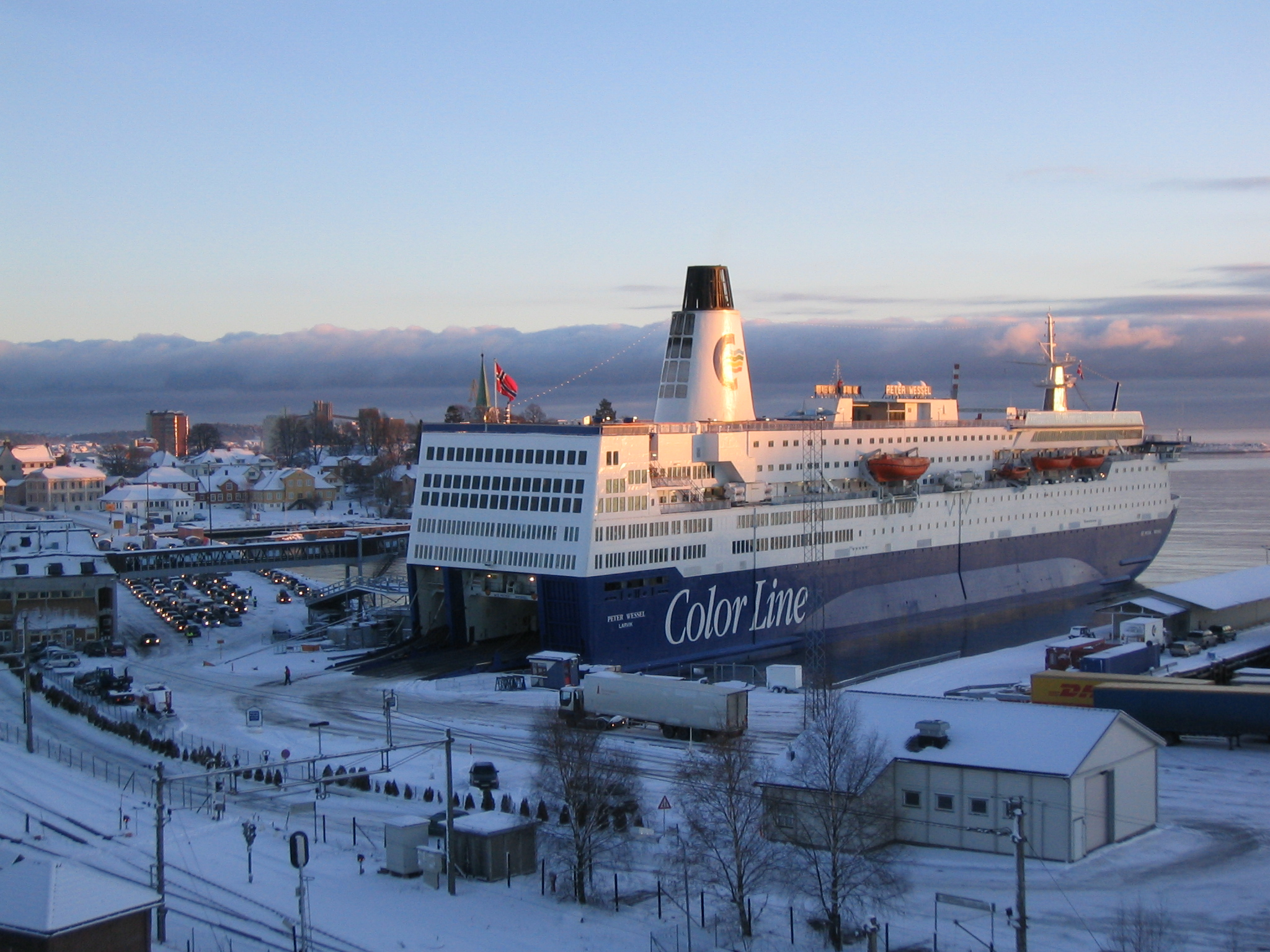
MS Peter Wessel in Larvik

In October 1996 Color Line chartered the Peter Wessel from Larvik Line, keeping her on the same route as before. In 1999 parts of the cardeck were built in with cabins, decreasing her car capacity. In spring 2003 the ship was rebuilt again, this time at Remontowa, Poland with large side sponsons for increased stabity. In 2004 Color Line bought the Peter Wessel from Larvik Line.

In April 2006 the ship was transferred to the Larvik—Hirtshals route. On 22 March 2007 a fire broke out in one of the ship's electric switchboards, which forced her to sail to Frederikshavn. Due to repairs the ship was forced to stay out of service for over a month, returning to service on 26 April 2007.

On 19 October 2007 Color Line reported that the Peter Wessel has been sold to Mediterranean Shipping Company, to be delivered after the delivery of the new MS Color Superspeed 2 in April–May 2008. The Peter Wessel was delivered to her new owners on 16 April 2008 and subsequently renamed MS SNAV Toscana.

=== 2008–2026: SNAV-GNV ===
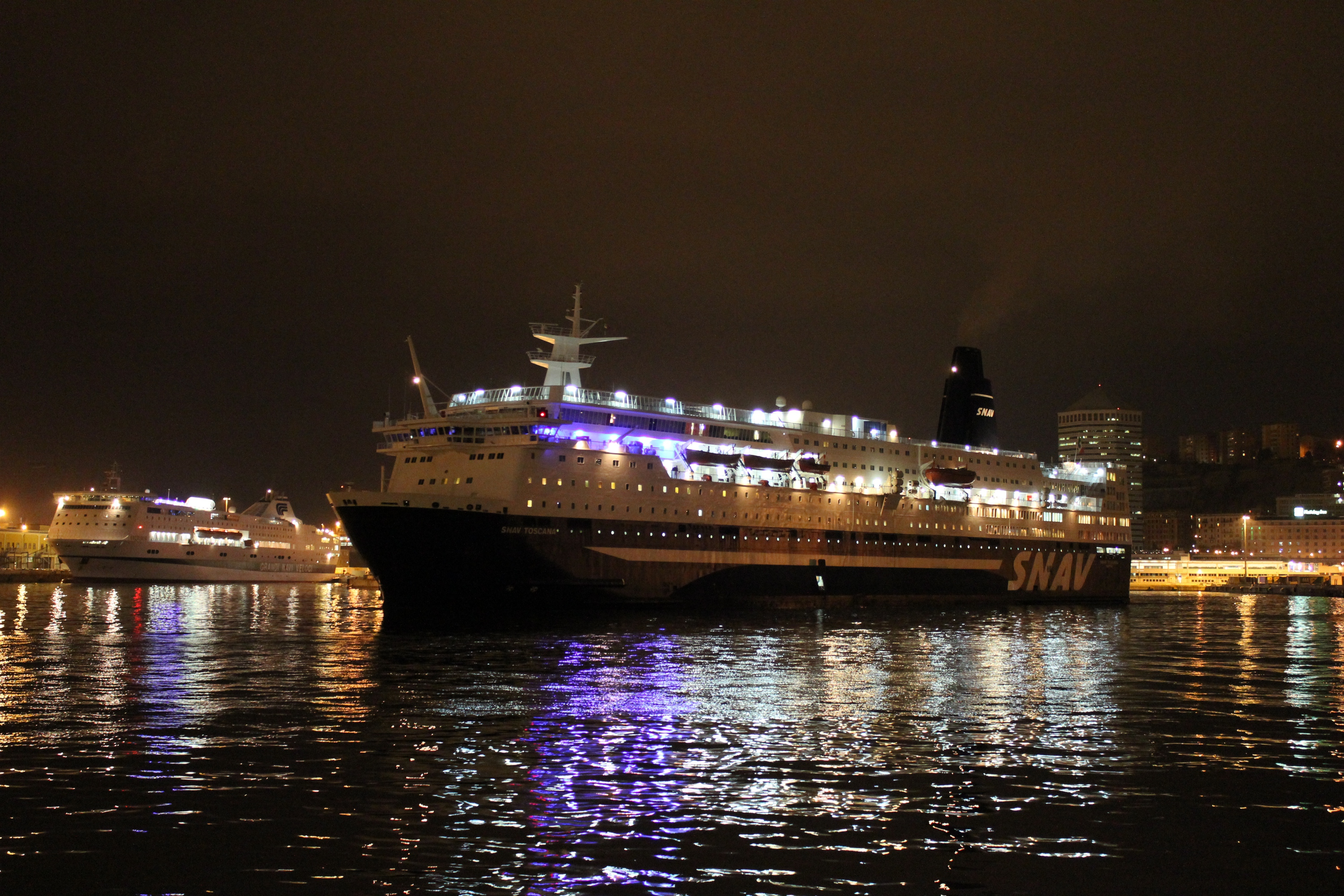
SNAV Toscana in Genoa harbour in 2011

In April 2008, the vessel transferred to the Mediterranean and began operating for SNAV, later serving the Genoa to Porto Torres route. In 2017, she was renamed GNV Azzurra and continued her service until 2026, when she was retired and sent to Turkey for scrapping.
