= USS Garcia =

1963 Garcia-class frigate

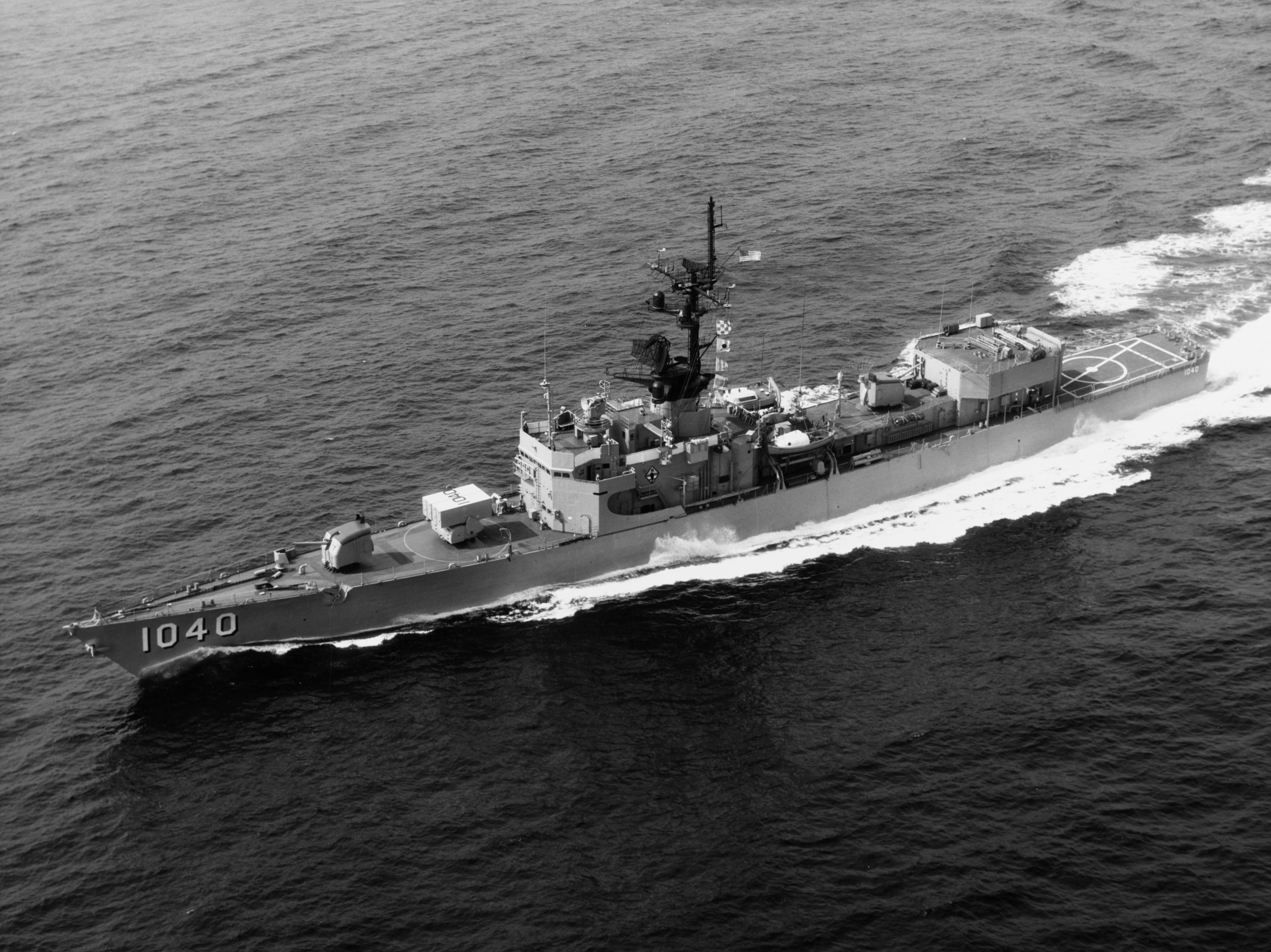
- The USS Garcia off the shores of Newport, Rhode Island in August 1972

History
- Name: USS Garcia
- Namesake: Fernando Luis Garcia
- Awarded: 22 June 1961
- Builder: Bethlehem Steel, San Francisco, California
- Laid down: 16 October 1962
- Launched: 31 October 1963
- Acquired: 3 December 1964
- Commissioned: 21 December 1964
- Decommissioned: 31 January 1989
- Out of service: 1989
- Reclassified: 30 June 1975*
- Stricken: 31 January 1989
- Home port: Charleston, South Carolina, U.S.
- Identification: DE-1040 (1964); FF-1040 (1975)
- Nickname(s): Greasy-G
- Fate: Scrapped 29 March 1994
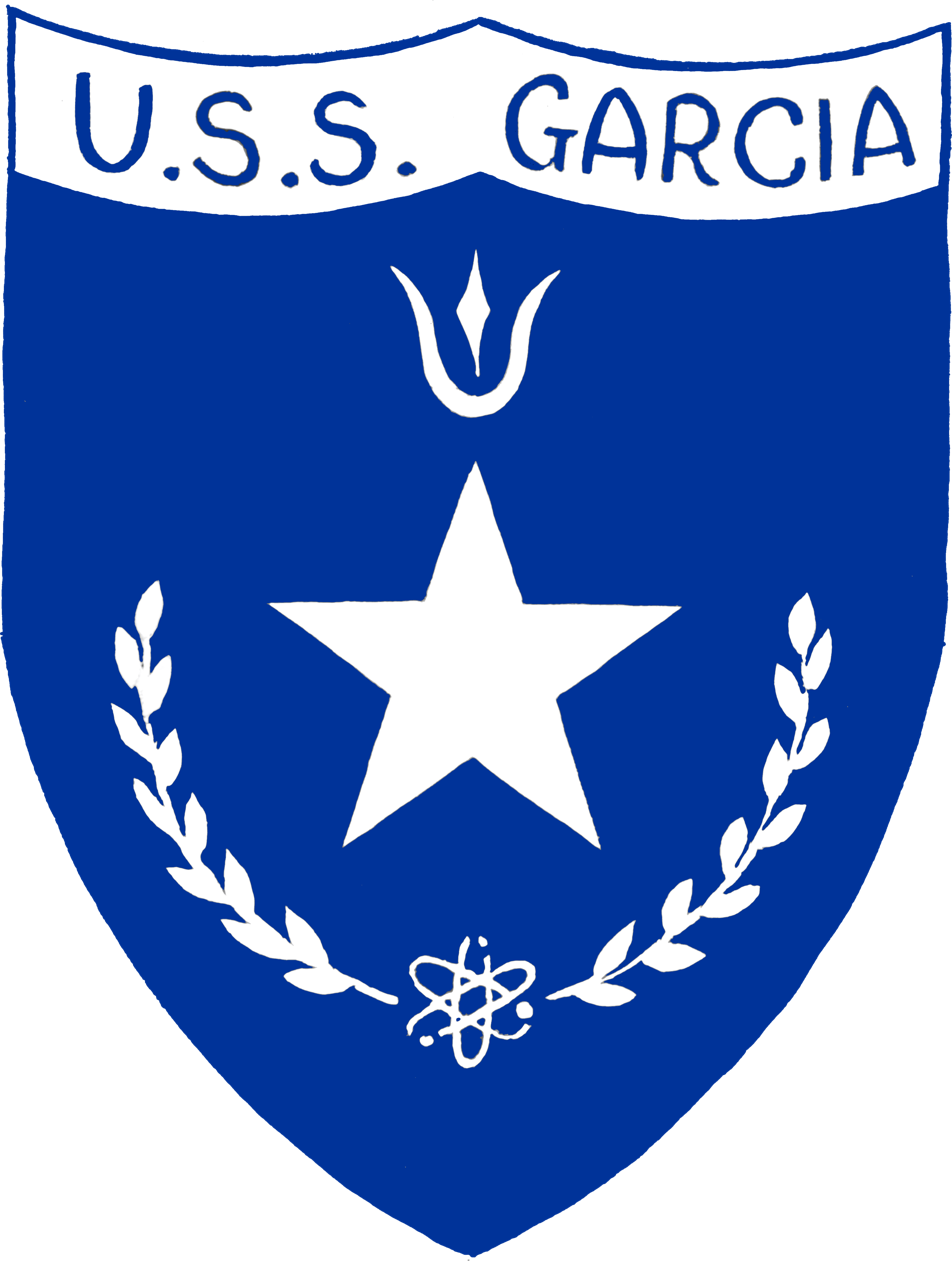
- Badge

History

Pakistan
- Namesake: Saif
- Acquired: 31 January 1989
- Out of service: 1994
- Renamed: Siaf
- Identification: F264

General characteristics
- Class & type: Garcia-class frigate
- Displacement: 2,624 tons (light)
- Length: 414 ft 6 in (126.34 m)
- Beam: 44 ft 1 in (13.44 m)
- Draft: 24 ft 6 in (7.47 m)
- Installed power: 2 Foster-Wheeler boilers; 35,000 shp (26,000 kW)
- Propulsion: 1 Westinghouse turbine, 1 screw
- Speed: 27 knots (50 km/h; 31 mph)
- Complement: 16 officers; 231 enlisted
- Sensors & processing systems: AN/SPS-40 air search radar; AN/SPS-10 surface search radar; AN/SQS-26 bow mounted sonar
- Armament: 2 × single 5 in (127 mm)/38 cal. Mk 30 gun; 1 8-tube ASROC Mk16 launcher (16 missiles); 2 × triple 12.75 in (324 mm) Mk 32 torpedo tubes, Mk 46 torpedoes; 2 × MK 37 torpedo tubes (fixed, stern) (removed later)
- Aircraft carried: 1 x SH-2F Seasprite LAMPS I

USS Garcia (FF-1040) was the lead ship of her class of destroyer escort ships, later reclassified as frigates, in the United States Navy. She was named for U.S. Marine Private First Class Fernando Luis Garcia, the first Puerto Rican Medal of Honor Recipient.

Laid down on 16 October 1962 by Bethlehem Steel of San Francisco, California, Garcia was launched on 31 October 1963 and commissioned on 21 December 1964. Originally designated DE-1040, she was redesignated FF-1040 in 1975 as part of the Navy's 1975 ship reclassification.

She served in the Atlantic Fleet and was homeported in Newport, Rhode Island, and Charleston, South Carolina.

== Pakistan service ==
Following her decommissioning on 31 January 1989, she was transferred to Pakistan on the same day. Renamed Saif, she was returned to the United States on 13 January 1994 and was then sold for scrap on 29 March 1994.

== Awards, Citations and Campaign Ribbons ==
| Navy Unit Commendation (with one star) |
| Navy "E" Ribbon |
| Navy Expeditionary Medal |
| National Defense Service Medal |
| Armed Forces Expeditionary Medal |
