= Grisslehamn =

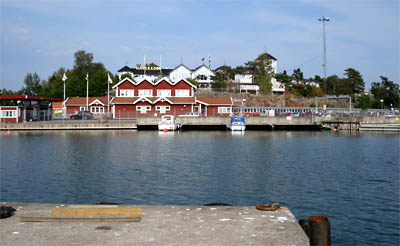
- Grisslehamns harbour, with the ferry terminal (the red building) and Hotell Havsbaden (the white building behind).

- Location within Stockholm Location within Sweden Location within European Union
- Coordinates: 60°05′55″N 18°48′55″E
- Country: Sweden
- Province: Uppland
- County: Stockholm County
- Municipality: Norrtälje Municipality

Area
  - Total: 1.22 km^{2} (0.47 sq mi)

Population (31 December 2020)
  - Total: 410
  - Density: 340/km^{2} (870/sq mi)
- Time zone: UTC+1 (CET)
  - Summer (DST): UTC+2 (CEST)

Grisslehamn is a locality and port located on the coast of the Sea of Åland in Norrtälje Municipality, Stockholm County, Sweden. The locality had 249 inhabitants in 2010.

The name Grisslehamn was first mentioned in a document from 1376 about the mail route between Sweden and Finland. This Grisslehamn was located some 20 km south of today's location. In the mid-18th century, most of the old village was destroyed in a fire, and it was decided to move Grisslehamn to its current location to make the mail route shorter. Conveying mail by row boat from Sweden to the Åland islands, whence it was transported to the Finnish mainland, was, together with fishing, one of the most important sources of income for the inhabitants of Grisslehamn and other parts of Roslagen for a long time, until steam ships took over the mail routes in the early 20th century.

Today the port is the Swedish terminal of the Eckerö Linjen ferries which cross to Berghamn on the island of Eckerö in the Åland islands.

The artist Albert Engström had a studio in Grisslehamn, where he painted oils and water colours of the Roslagen landscape. He lived in the town for a number of years, and his home is now a museum of his life and work.

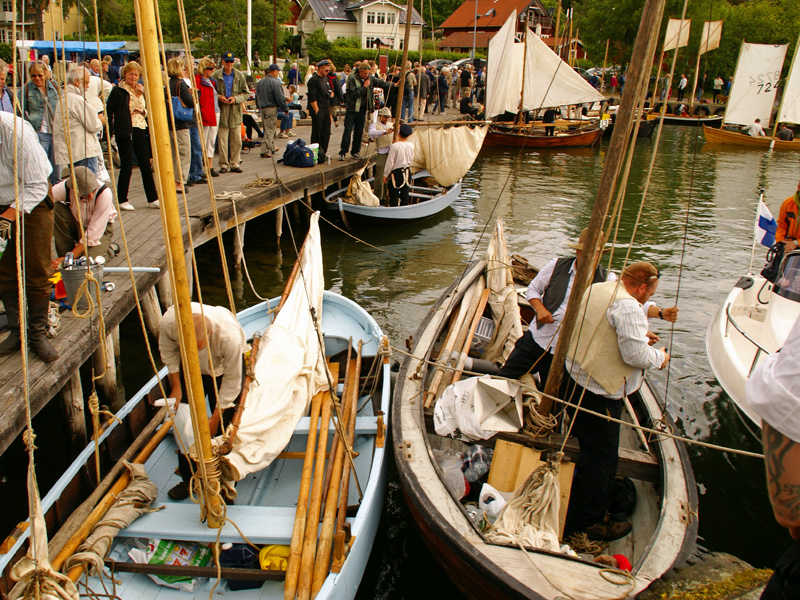
Traditional post boats at Grisslehamn

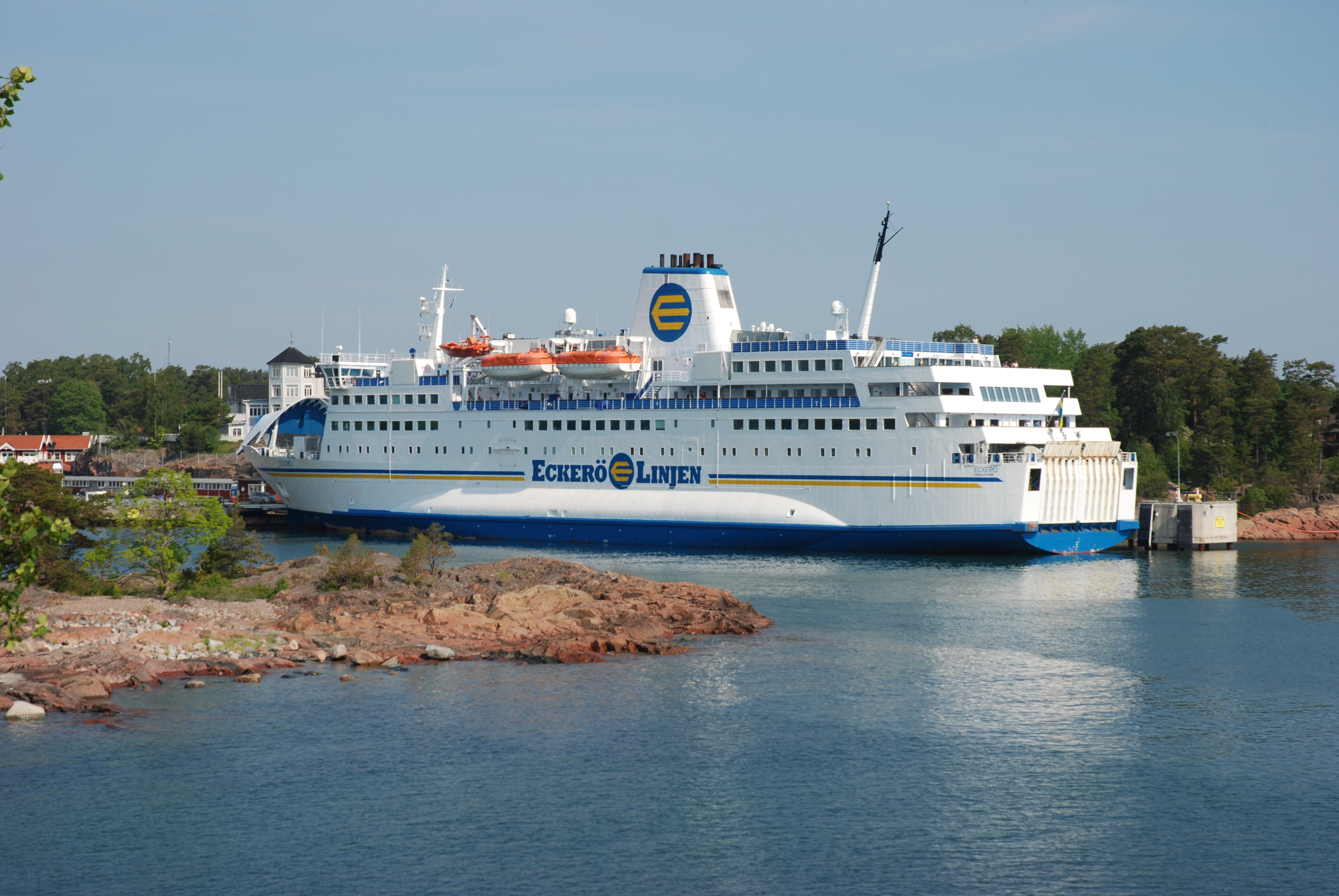
Eckerö Linjen ferry in Grisslehamn harbour

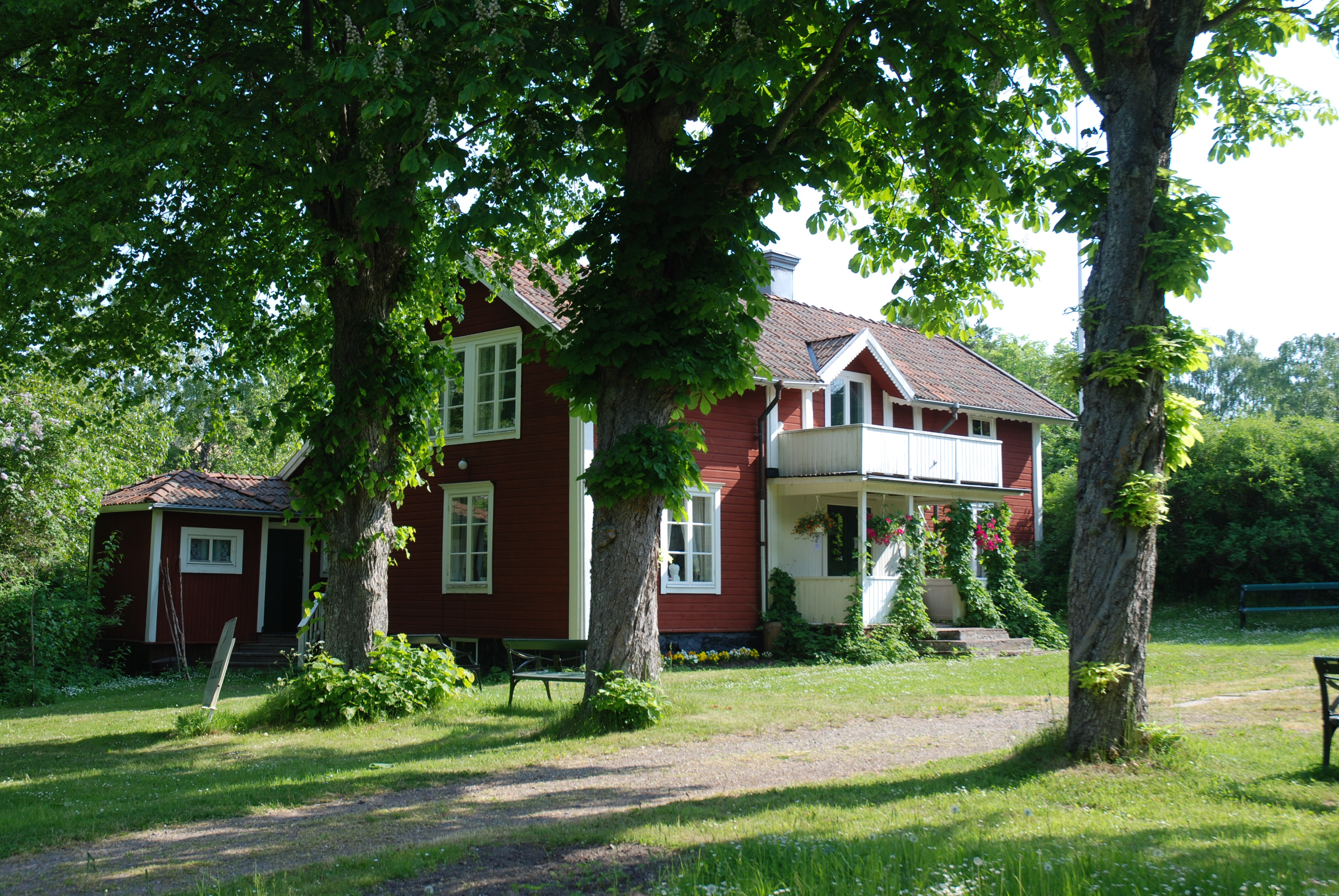
The Albert Engström museum

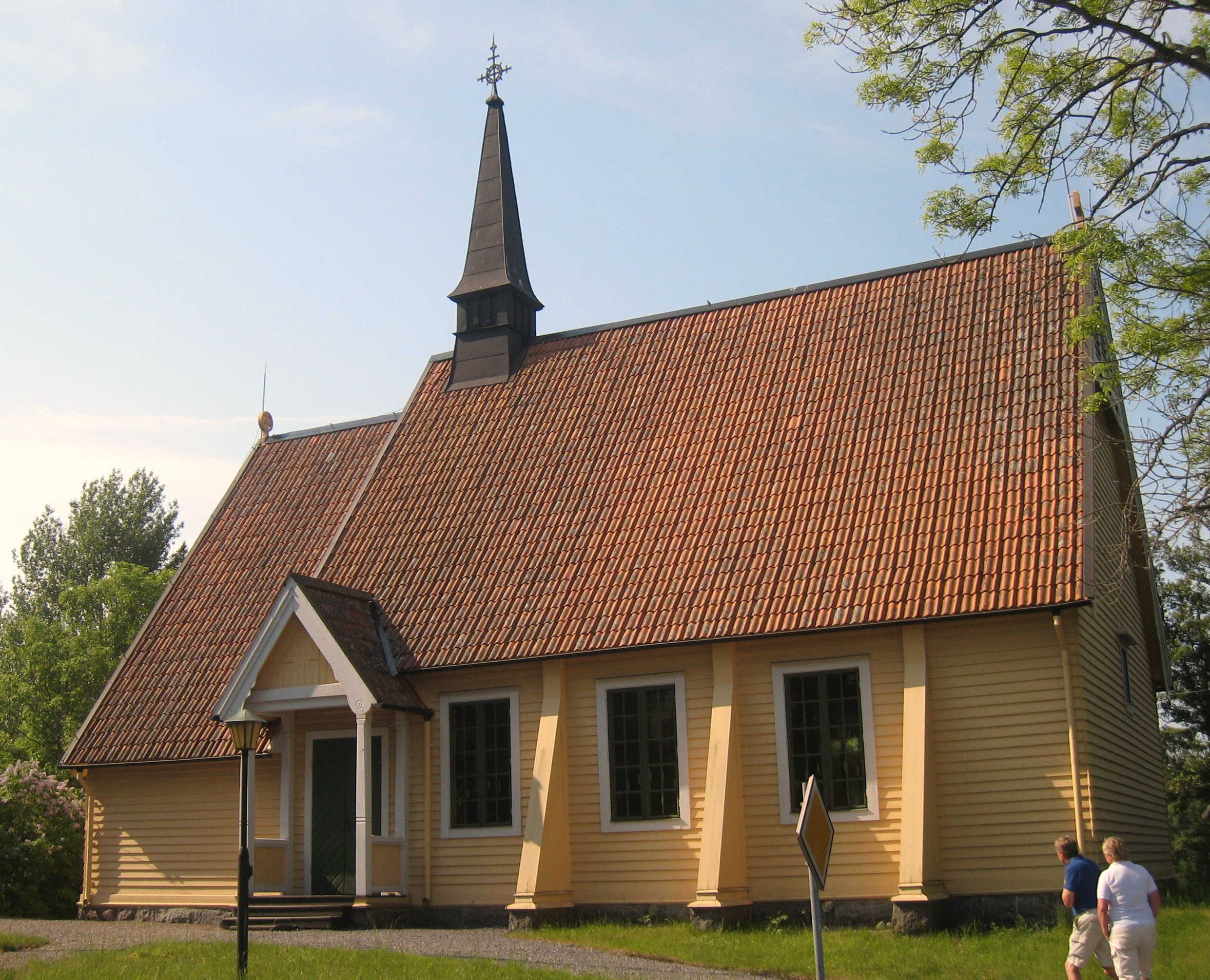
The chapel in Grisslehamn
