= Eckerö =

- Municipality
- Eckerö kommun
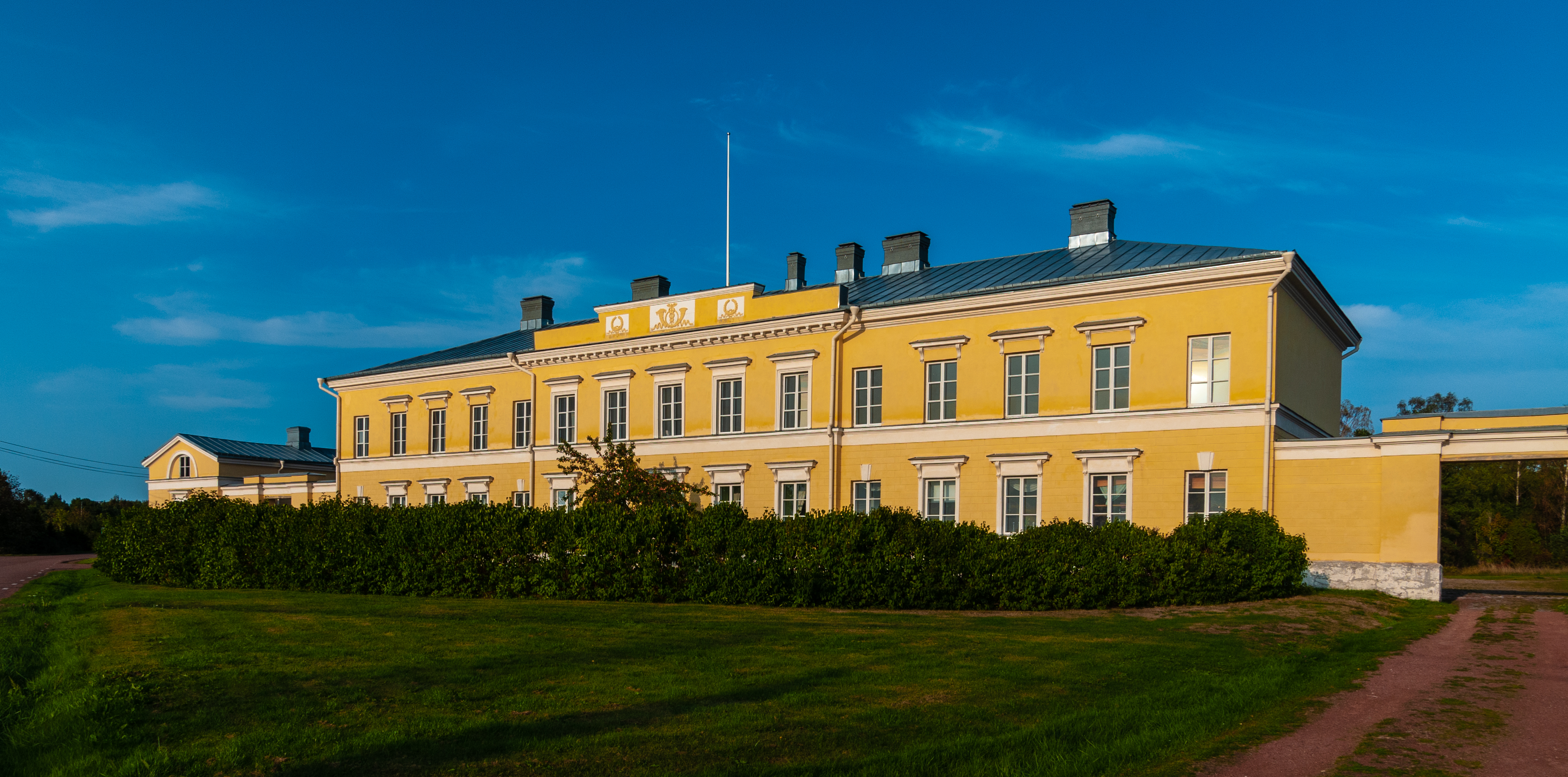
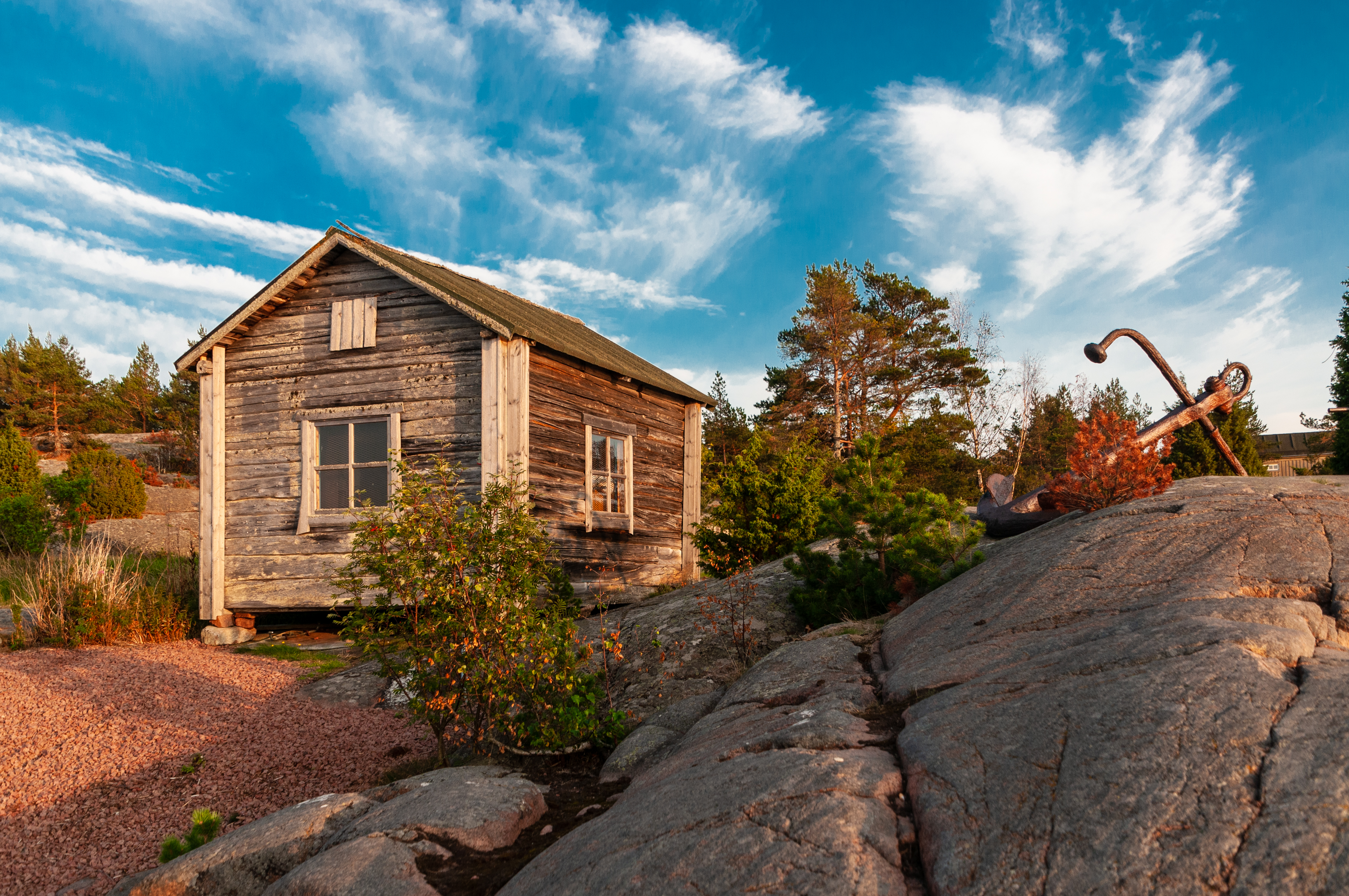
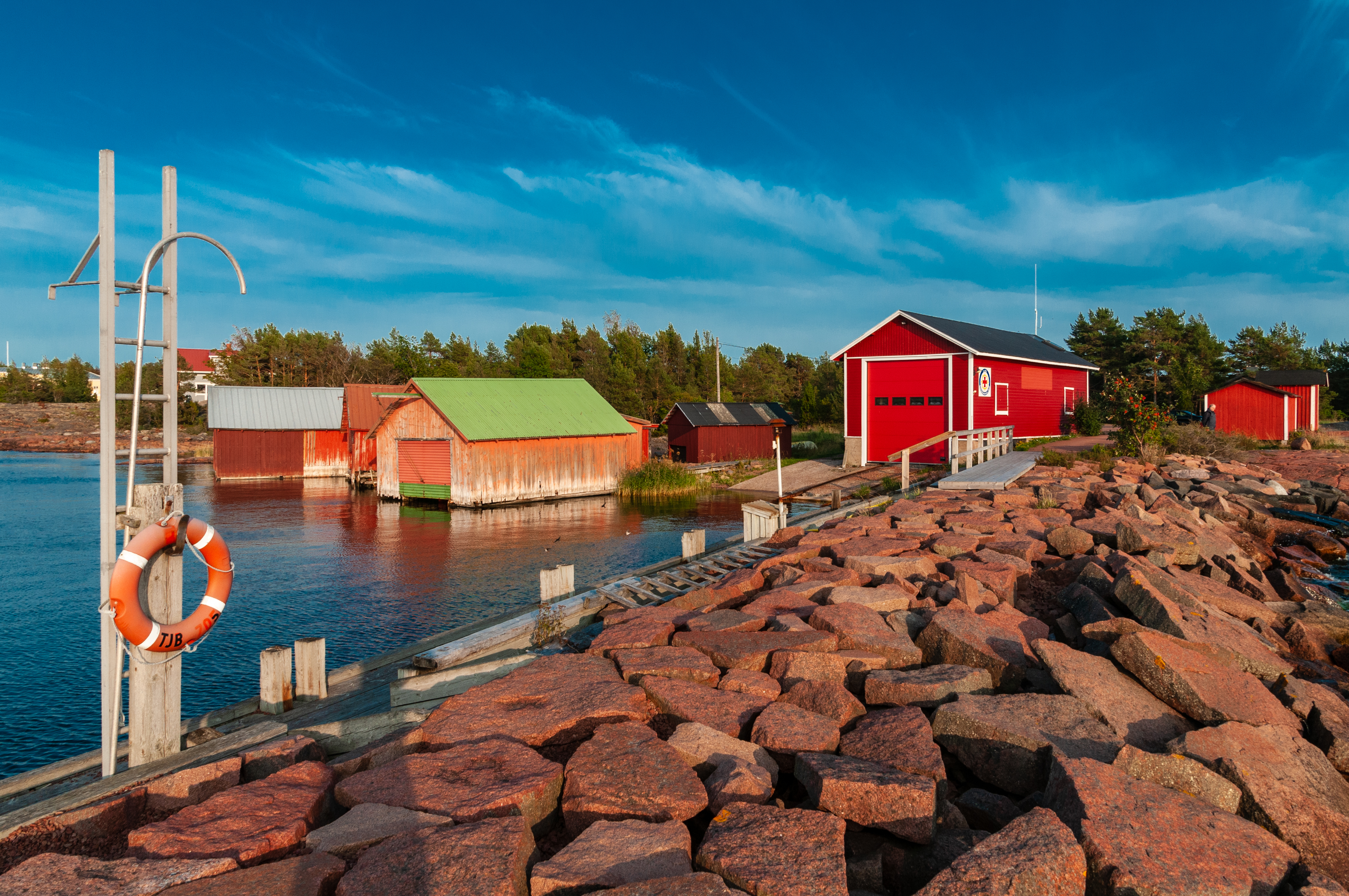
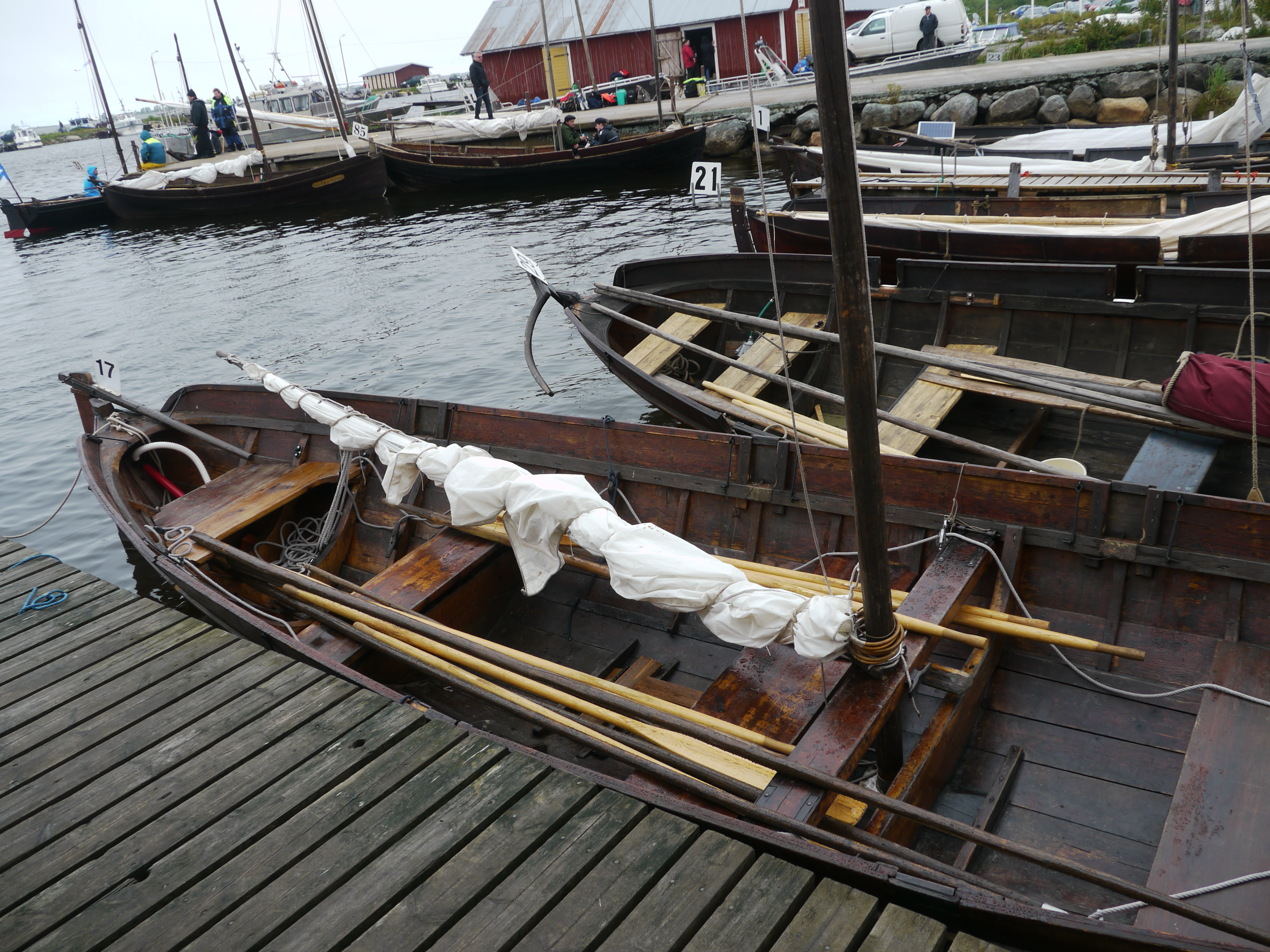
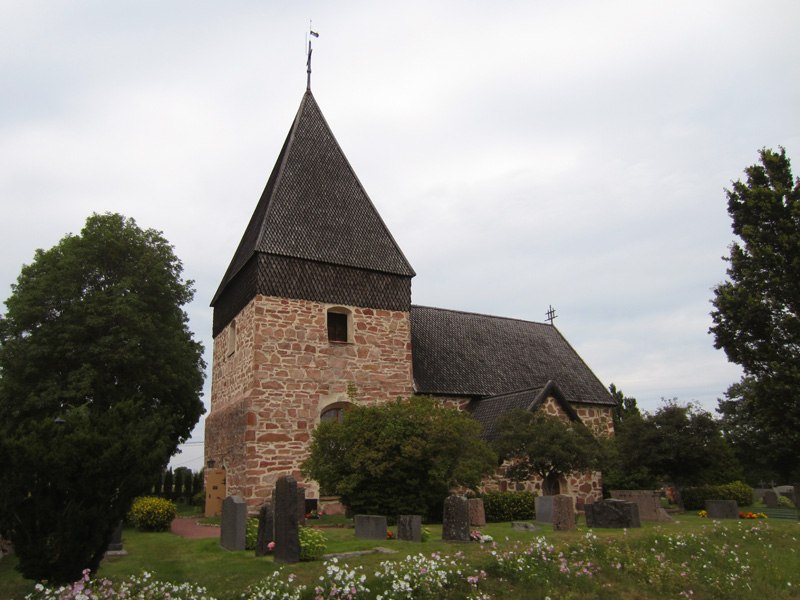
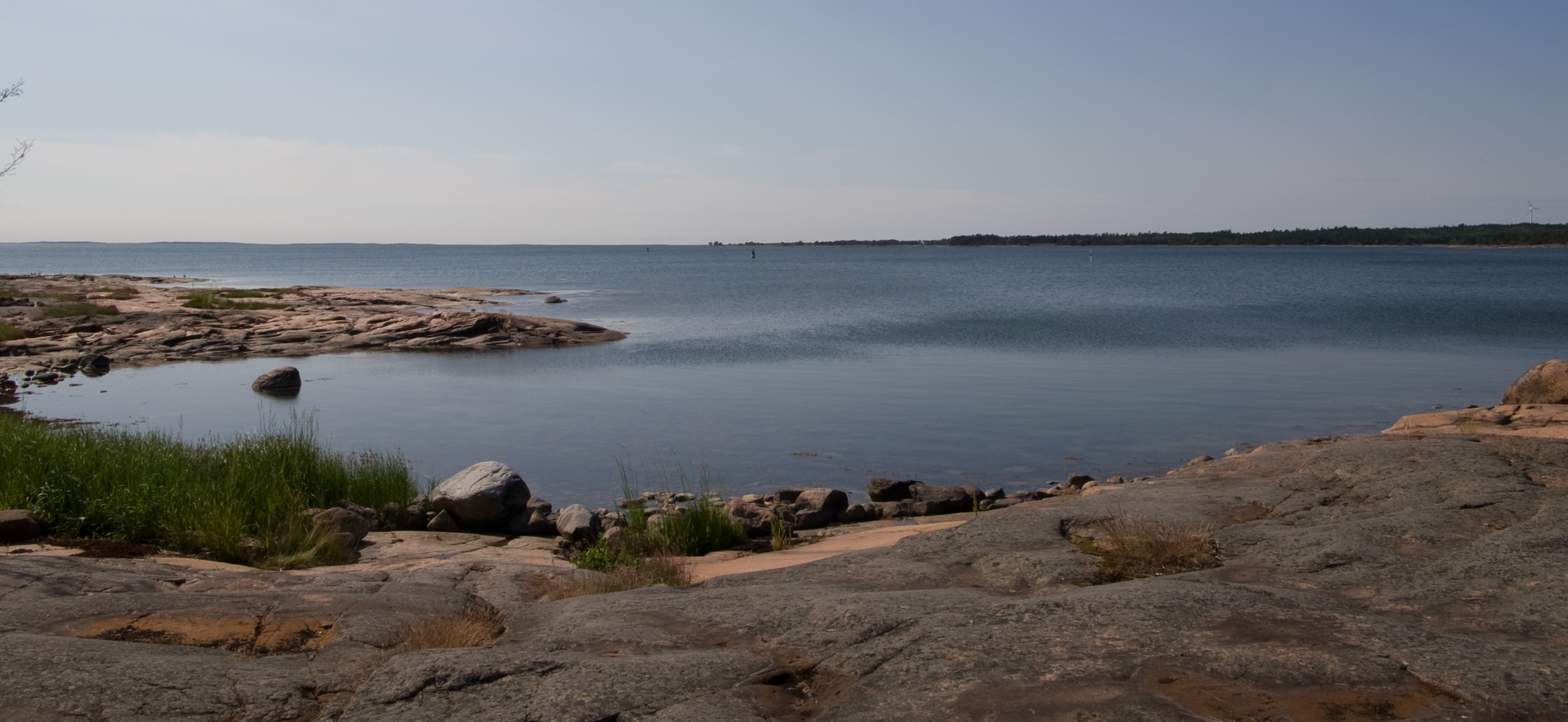
- Eckerö

- Coat of arms

- Location of Eckerö in Finland

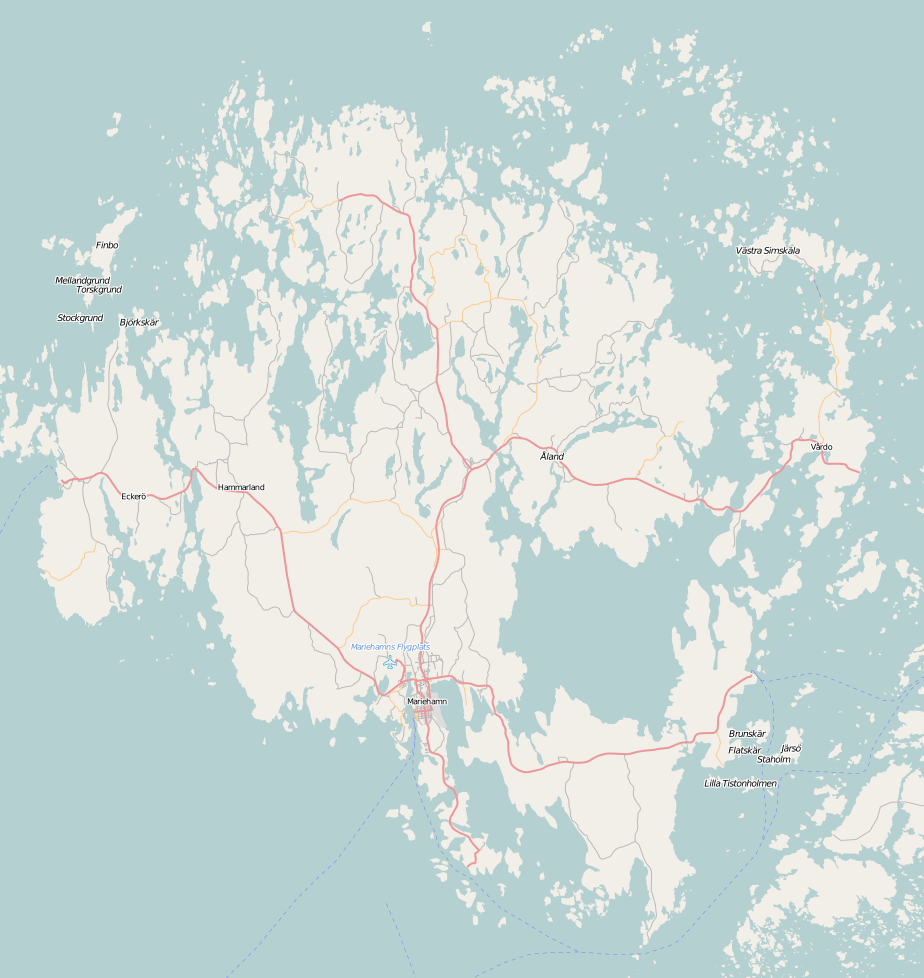
- Location in Åland
- Coordinates: 60°13′N 019°33′E
- Country: Finland
- Region: Åland
- Sub-region: Countryside

Government

Area (2018-01-01)
  - Total: 752.67 km^{2} (290.61 sq mi)
  - Land: 107.72 km^{2} (41.59 sq mi)
  - Water: 644.94 km^{2} (249.01 sq mi)
  - Rank: 297th largest in Finland

Population (2025-12-31)
  - Total: 961
  - Rank: 295th largest in Finland
  - Density: 8.92/km^{2} (23.1/sq mi)

Population by native language
  - Swedish: 85.7% (official)
  - Finnish: 4.5%
  - Others: 9.8%

Population by age
  - 0 to 14: 14%
  - 15 to 64: 59.6%
  - 65 or older: 26.4%
- Time zone: UTC+02:00 (EET)
  - Summer (DST): UTC+03:00 (EEST)
- Website: www.eckero.ax

Eckerö is a municipality of Åland, an autonomous territory under Finnish sovereignty. The municipality has a population of 961 (31 December 2025) and covers an area of 752.67 square kilometres (290.61 sq mi) of which 644.94 km^{2} (249.01 sq mi) is water. The population density is 8.92 inhabitants per square kilometre (23.1/sq mi).

The municipality is unilingually Swedish and 85.7% of the population are Swedish speakers. It is the westernmost municipality of Åland and Finland. The company Eckerö Linjen operates a ferry connection between Berghamn in Storby, Eckerö and Grisslehamn on Väddö, Norrtälje in Sweden.

The municipality has previously also been known as Ekkerö in Finnish documents, but is today referred to as "Eckerö" also in Finnish.

Eckerö's most famous building is the Post and Customs house. It is the largest building that has been erected to aid the postal services between Stockholm and St. Petersburg. The building was built during the Russian era in 1828. Architect C.L Engel made the construction plans.

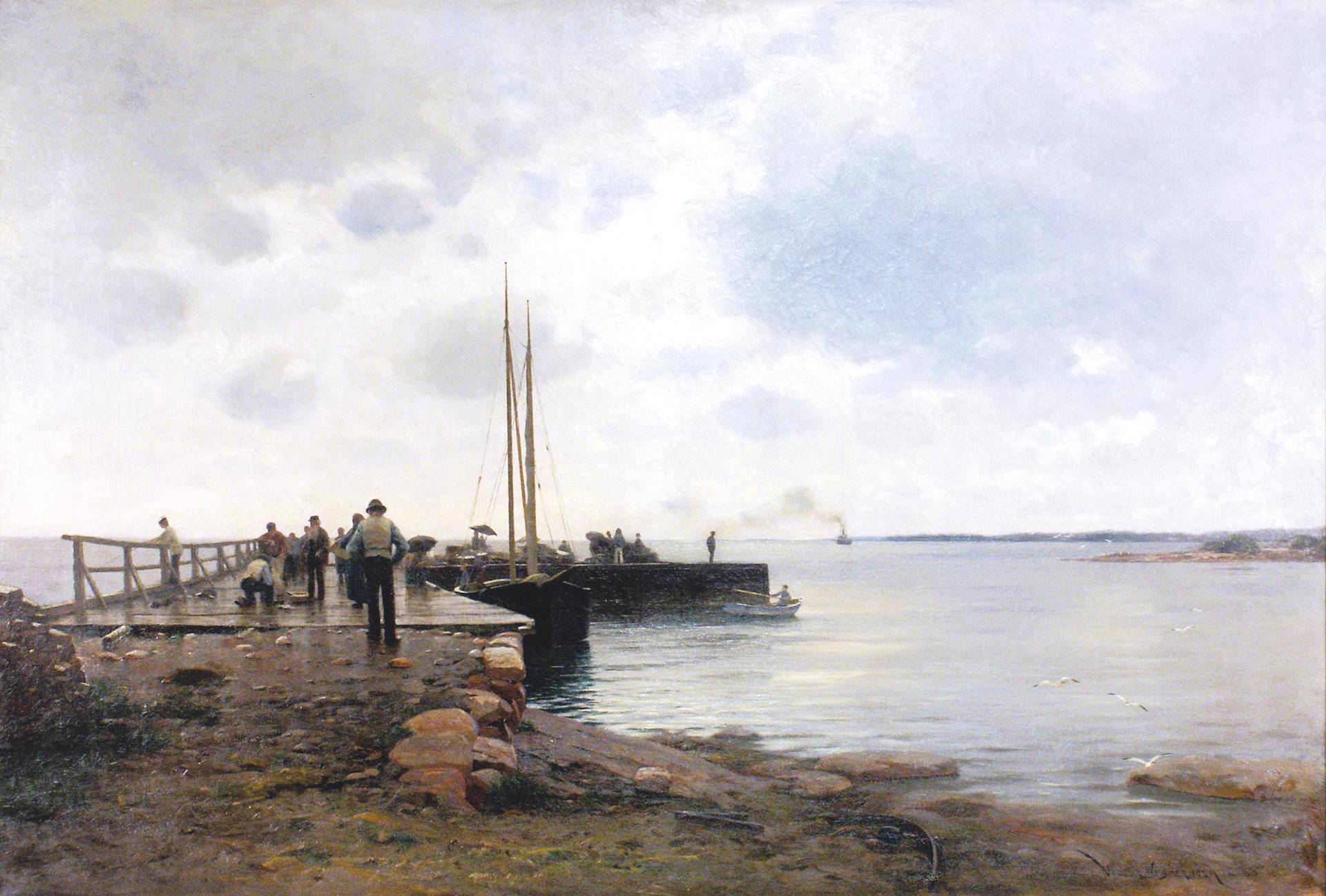
Eckerö Post Quay by Victor Westerholm in 1885
