= Wasaline =

Finnish shipping company

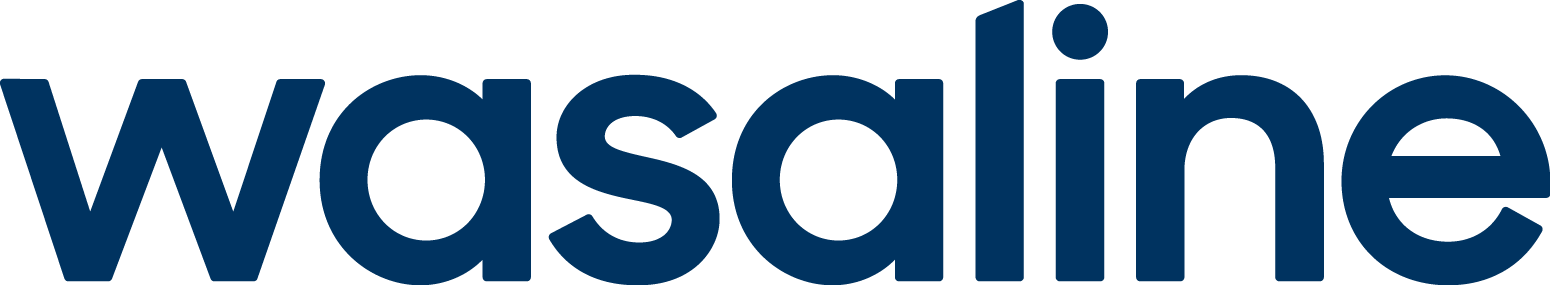

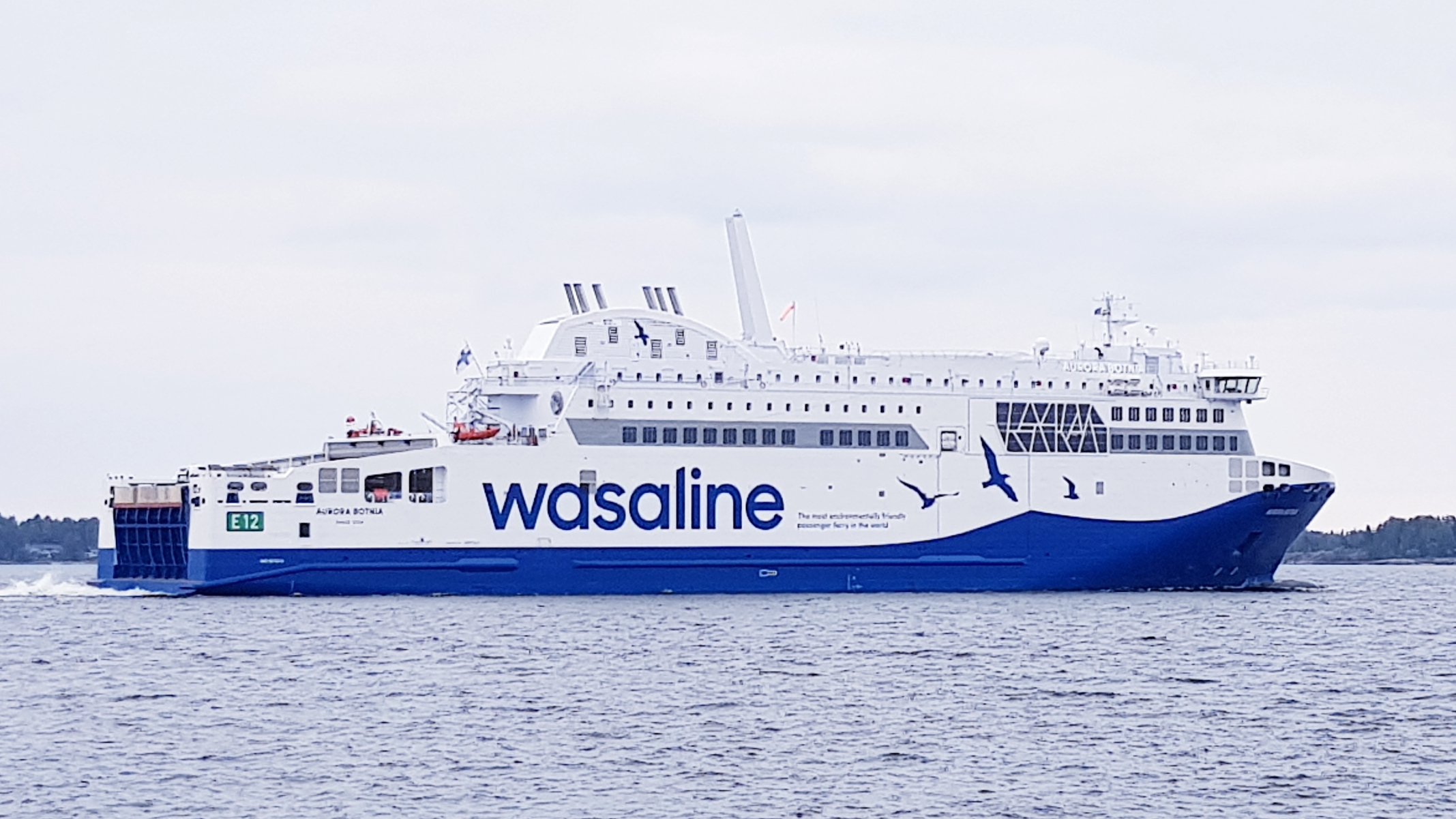
- Aurora Botnia, 2021
- Industry: Passenger transportation
- Predecessor: Vaasa-Umeå Ab; Vaasa-Umeå AB; Oy Vaasanlaivat - Vasabåtarna Ab; Wasa Line
- Founded: 2012; 14 years ago
- Headquarters: Vaasa, Finland
- Area served: Gulf of Bothnia
- Owner: Stena Line
- Website: https://www.wasaline.com/

Wasaline is the trade name of NLC Ferry Ab Oy, a Finnish shipping company that operates the passenger and freight ferry route between Vaasa, Finland and Umeå, Sweden.

== History ==
Rederi Ab Vasa-Umeå was founded in 1948 to transport passengers through Kvarken, the narrowest part of the Gulf of Bothnia, with its first journey in May aboard its first ship, the MS Turisten. Like its founders, residents of both sides of Kvarken are predominantly Swedish-speaking.

Its first ships were used steamers, only capable of summer traffic. In 1958, Merivienti Oy, a subsidiary of the Finnish forestry giant Enso-Gutzeit, became the largest owner of Rederi Ab Vasa-Umeå.

With funds from the new owner, the firm could purchase their first ship capable of carrying cars, the SS Korsholm III. In 1962, it was delivered its only newbuild, MS Vaasa, a freighter that spent most of its career in the company chartered elsewhere, until it was sold in 1964.

=== Oy Vaasa-Umeå Ab ===
Sold by Sessan Linjen in 1964, the MS Wasa Express was its first genuine car and passenger ferry, initiating a trend of adding "Express" to ship names. In 1967, two years after the company was renamed in the bilingual form Oy Vaasa – Umeå Ab, the operation between Vaasa and Sundsvall was launched after the purchase of MS Botnia Express.

In 1970, a line from Vaasa to Örnsköldsvik was opened. The following year the company expanded further, opening a line between Pori and Sundsvall, however it proved unprofitable and was cancelled the following year.

In 1976, Vaasa-Umeå purchased MS Viking 3 from Rederi Ab Sally, and reused the name Wasa Express for her. During the following decade three of her sister ships would also find their way into Vaasa-Umeå's fleet. In fact the company had considered ordering a newbuild of the same class in the early 70's, but had decided it would be too expensive.

=== Vaasanlaivat – Vasabåtarna ===
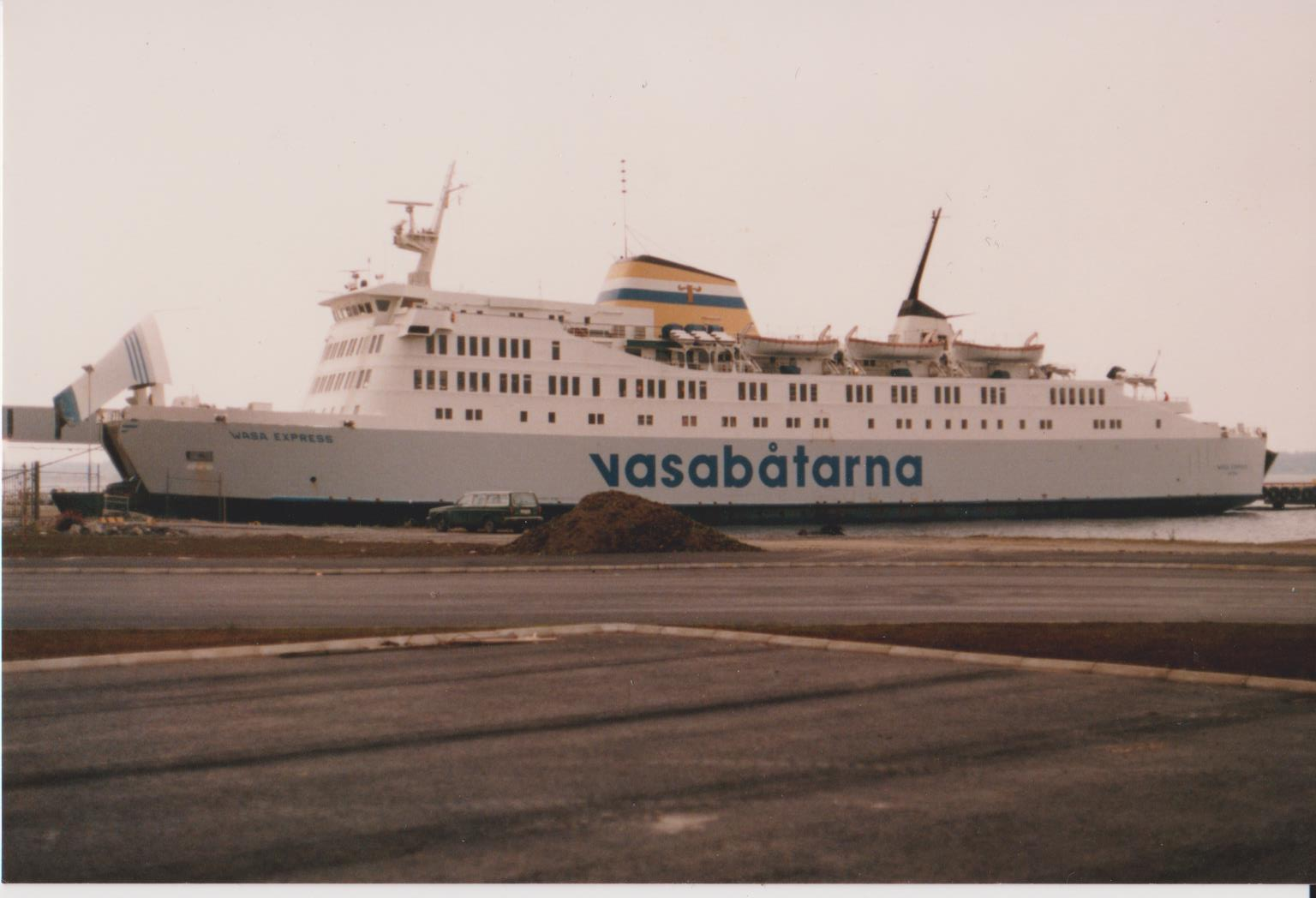
Wasa Express (former MS Viking 1) in Port of Vaasa in 1980s

Enso-Gutzeit became the sole owner of Vaasa-Umeå in 1979, and changed the company's name to Vaasanlaivat – Vasabåtarna (The Vaasa Boats). The same year Wasa Express' sister ship MS Botnia Express was added to the company's fleet.

In 1981, the company chartered MS Wasa Star from Rederi AB Gotland, bringing the first large ferry to the Gulf of Bothnia. Unfortunately there were not enough passengers to support such a large ship and it was laid up in autumn 1982, later subchartered to Karageorgios Line in Greece.

In 1982 Enso-Gutzeit decided to bow out of the shipping business, and Vaasanlaivat was sold to Rederi Ab Sally (most of their other operations passed to Effoa).

One of the longest-serving ships in the Gulf of Bothnia, the MS Fennia was acquired in 1986 from Jakob Lines, with part of the payment being the MS Fenno Express, a smaller ship more suited to Jakob's traffic.

When Sally was in a very precarious financial situation, the company was bought in 1987 by Effoa and Johnson Line, owners of Silja Line, which was decisive for the future of Vaasanlaivat.

=== Wasa Line ===
In 1989, Vaasanlaivat acquired Jakob Lines, hence starting to traffic between Jakobstad and Kokkola in Finland and Skellefteå in Sweden. Officially Jakob Lines survived until 1991, but by that time all their ships had the funnel markings of Vaasanlaivat.

In 1991, a year after the owners of Vaasanlaivat merged into EffJohn, the company was renamed to a more international name, Wasa Line. By the following year, it brought two ferries from its sister company, Silja Line: the new MS Wasa King and MS Wasa Queen.

As EffJohn was forced to reorganize its operations to cut costs, Wasa Line was merged into Silja Line in 1993. Silja continued to operate on Kvarken, but the line to Sundsvall was cancelled in 1996, and after the termination of tax-free sales on intra-European Union travel, Silja bowed out of traffic in the area altogether in the year 2000.

=== Kvarken traffic after Silja Line ===
For a while there was no traffic across Kvarken, until spring 2001 when the newly found RG Line purchased the Fennia from Silja Line and started up traffic from Vaasa to Umeå; RG Line filed for bankruptcy in November 2011. The Swedish company Botnia Link operated routes between Vaasa-Umeå and Vaasa-Härnosand; operations stopped in February 2002.

=== Current Wasaline ===
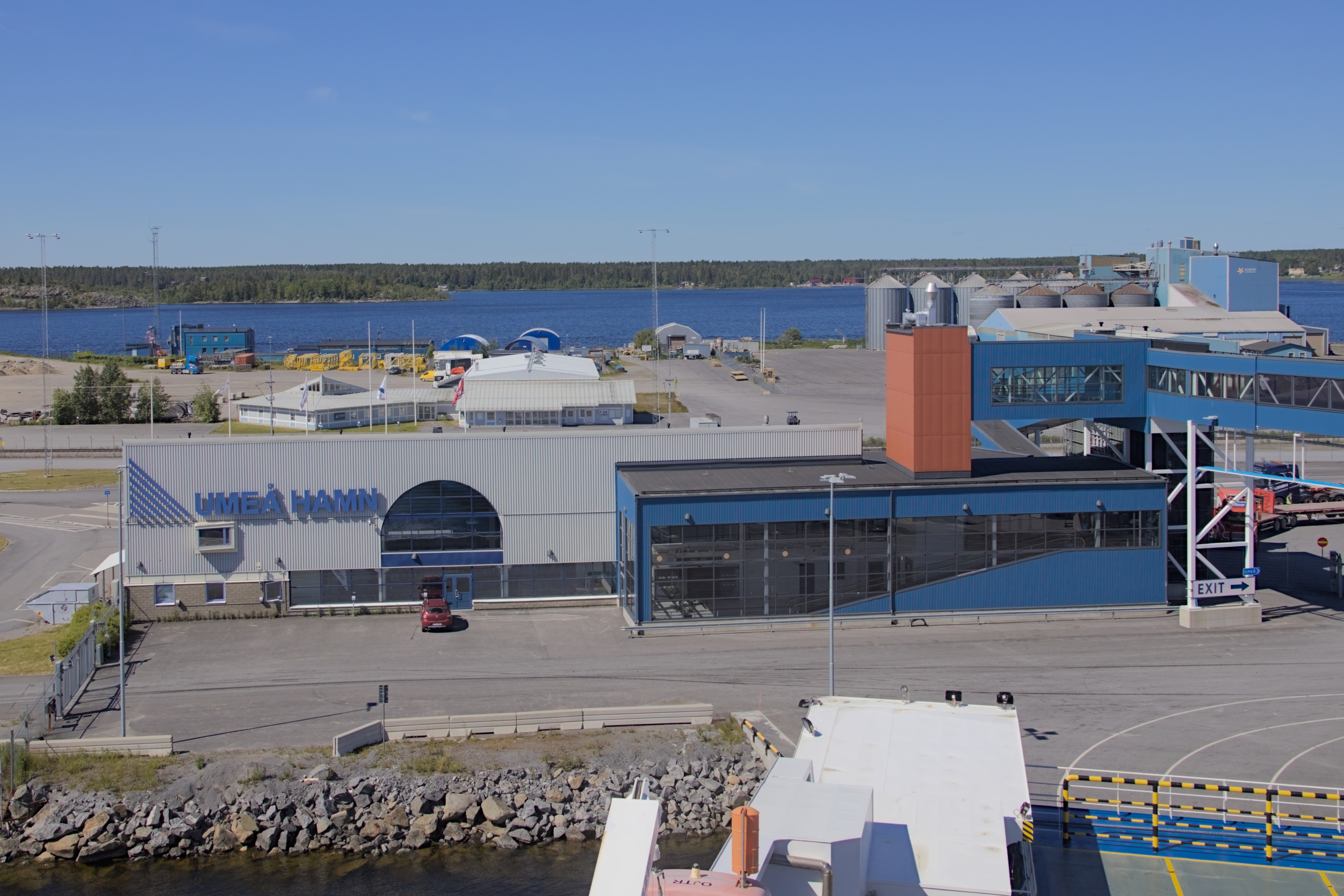
Wasaline terminal at Port of Umeå

To ensure ferry traffic between the two cities, the city of Vaasa and the municipality of Umeå founded a joint shipping company, NLC Ferry Ab Oy, in January 2012, acquiring the rights to the Wasaline brand from RG Line and starting operations with the ferry Wasa Express. Over the next years, Wasaline established itself as a reliable and valuable cargo carrier between Finland and Sweden and passenger numbers began rising once again.

Plans to replace the ageing Wasa Express were first introduced in 2016. Construction agreement between Kvarken Link (the company founded to run the newbuild project) with Rauma Marine Constructions shipyard was signed in January 2021.

Named Aurora Botnia after a competition, the new ferry began construction in Rauma, Finland, in September 2019, was launched in September 2020, and its sea trials began in May 2021. Aurora Botnia made its maiden voyage between Vaasa and Umeå on August 28, 2021.

In February 2026, Stena Line completed the purchase of Wasaline.

== Route statistics ==
	2020	2021	2022	2023	2024
Passengers	57,415	107,659	267,757	279,590	253,218
Passenger vehicles	14,532	24,590	55,661	63,647	59,183
Freight units	16,969	21,259	22,191	20,886	21,250
Company turnover	10,5 M€	16,4 M€	29,3 M€	29,1 M€	28 M€

== Ships ==
Ships operated by current Wasaline:

- Wasa Express (2013–2021)
- Aurora Botnia (2021–)

Ships on this route operated by previous companies. Not a complete list.

- Botnia Express (1979–1992)
- Wasa Star (1981–1982)
- Fennia (1986–1993)
- Wasa King (1991–1993)
- Wasa Queen (1992–1993)
