= MS Arberia =

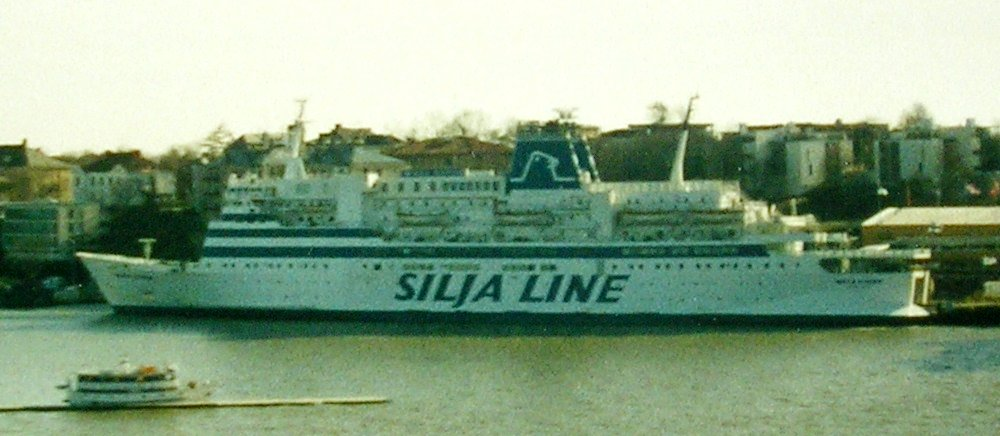
- MS Wasa Queen in Helsinki in the late 1990s in Silja Line colours.

History
- Name: 1975–1980: Bore Star; 1980–1986: Silja Star; 1986: Orient Express; 1986–1987: Club Sea; 1987–1989: Orient Express; 1989–1990: Eurosun; 1990: Orient Express; 1990–1991: Eurosun; 1991–1992: Orient Sun; 1992–2009: Wasa Queen; 2009–2011: Arberia; 2011–2013: Amet Majesty
- Owner: 1975–1980: Steamship Company Bore; 1980–1986: Effoa; 1986–1989: Sea Containers; 1989–2001: EffJohn; 2001–2009: Star Cruises; 2009–2013: Chryses Finance Co.
- Operator: 1975–1976: Finnlines; 1976: Steamship Company Bore; 1976–1977: Finnlines; 1977–1980: Steamship Company Bore; 1980–1986: Effoa; 1986: Sea Containers; 1986–1987: Club Sea Inc; 1987–1989: Sea Containers; 1989–1990: Europe Cruise Line; 1990: Sea Containers; 1990–1991: Europe Cruise Line; 1991–1992: Orient Line Pte Ltd; 1992–1993: Wasa Line; 1993–2000: Silja Line; 2001–2008: Cruise Ferries; 2009–2013: Ilion Lines
- Port of registry: 1975–1980: Turku, Finland; 1980–1986: Helsinki, Finland; 1986–1991: Hamilton, Bermuda; 1991–1992: Singapore, Singapore; 1992–1993: Vaasa, Finland; 1993–2001: Mariehamn, Finland; 2001–2011: Panama City, Panama; 2011–2013: Chennai, India
- Ordered: June 1973
- Builder: Dubigeon-Normandie, Nantes, France
- Yard number: 143
- Laid down: 16 September 1974
- Launched: 30 January 1975
- Completed: 1975
- Acquired: 2 December 1975
- In service: 11 December 1975
- Out of service: 2013
- Identification: IMO number: 7360198
- Fate: Scrapped at Alang, India in 2013

General characteristics (as built)
- Tonnage: 12,343 GRT; 1,800 DWT
- Length: 153.00 m (502 ft 0 in)
- Beam: 22.04 m (72 ft 4 in)
- Draught: 6.10 m (20 ft 0 in)
- Ice class: 1 A
- Propulsion: 4 × SEMT Pielstick 12 PC2-2V-400 diesels; combined 17,600 kW
- Speed: 21 knots (39 km/h; 24 mph)
- Capacity: 1,200 passengers; 799 berths; 240 cars

General characteristics (currently)
- Tonnage: 16,546 GT; 1,995 DWT
- Capacity: 1,599 passengers; 762 berths; 210 cars

MS Bore Star was a cruiseferry owned by Chryses Finance Co. and operated by Ilion Lines on their Trieste–Durrës–Bari service. She was built in 1975 by Dubigeon-Normandie, Nantes, France as Bore Star for Steamship Company Bore, which used her in Silja Line services on the Baltic Sea. During the northern hemisphere winter months she was chartered to Finnlines for cruise services on the African west coast. In 1980 she was sold to Finland Steamship Company and renamed Silja Star but retained in Silja Line service. Between 1986 and 1992 she was used in different cruise and ferry services around the world for various operators under the names Orient Express, Club Sea, Eurosun and Orient Sun. In 1992 her ownership passed to Wasa Line and she was renamed Wasa Queen for Baltic Sea ferry service. In 1993 Wasa Line was merged into Silja Line and Wasa Queen returned to the Silja Line fleet. In 2001 she was sold to Star Cruises for use in Far Eastern ferry services and later casino cruising with its daughter company Cruise Ferries without a change in name. In 2008 Wasa Queen was withdrawn from service and in 2009 sold to her current owners.

== History ==
=== 1975-1986 ===
In 1972 the Finnish-Swedish ferry consortium Silja Line started around-the-year car/passenger ferry traffic between Helsinki and Stockholm, the capitals of Finland and Sweden respectively. The route proved highly profitable and after just one year of traffic Silja Line's owners (Finland Steamship Company, Rederi AB Svea and Steamship Company Bore) decided that each company would order a ship of identical design from the same shipyard that had built the 1972 ships.

MS Bore Star was the last of the new ships to be delivered, in December 1975. However it turned out that there weren't actually enough passengers for three ships in year-round traffic on the Helsinki—Stockholm service. As a result, Bore Star was chartered to Finnlines immediately after delivery. Until May 1976 she cruised around the Canary Islands and West Coast of Africa under the trade name Finnpartner (her official name remained unchanged). In June 1976 Bore Star was finally set on the traffic she was built for, and sailed as a third ship on the Helsinki—Stockholm service alongside her sisters Svea Corona and Wellamo until the end of October 1976 (she also briefly served on the Turku—Stockholm route in May and September). Between October 1976 and May 1977 Bore Star was again chartered to Finnlines for cruising in the Atlantic.

From June 1977 onwards Bore Star served on the Helsinki—Stockholm route. In the beginning of the year 1979 Steamship Company Bore changed its name to Bore Line. At this time passenger numbers on the Baltic Sea were raising rapidly and Finland SS Co (which had changed its name to Effoa in 1976) and Svea were planning to build new ships for the Helsinki—Stockholm service. Bore wanted to concentrate on freight traffic and as a result the company sold its share of Silja Line to the other owners in July 1980, and Bore Star's ownership passed to Effoa. Forllowing the sale she was transferred to the Turku—Mariehamn—Stockholm service. In September of the same year the ship was renamed MS Silja Star. In January 1986 she was replaced by the new Wellamo and sold to Sea Containers.

=== 1986-1992 ===
After being sold to Sea Containers the Silja Star was rebuilt at Lloyd Werft, Bremerhaven, Germany. In April 1986 she re-emerged as MS Orient Express and started sailing on a route connecting Venice, Pireus, and Istanbul. Between December 1986 and April 1987 the ship was chartered to Club Sea Inc who used for cruising on the Caribbean as MS Club Sea. After the charter she returned to her previous name and route until 1989 when she was chartered to Europe Cruise Line (who were in part owned by her old owners Effoa) as Eurosun for cruising on the Mediterranean. In December of the same year Europe Cruise Line bought the ship, but in May 1990 she was chartered back to Sea Containers, again renamed Orient Express and set on the Venice—Istanbul service. From November onwards she returned to Europe Cruise Line and under the name Eurosun.

In September 1991 the ship was sold to Orient Line (owned by EffJohn, the company resulting from a merger between Effoa and Johnson Line), renamed MS Orient Sun and started ferry service between Singapore and Jakarta, Indonesia. Like her previous routes this would prove to be short-lived. In March 1992 the ship ceased trading in the Far East and returned to the Baltic Sea.

=== 1992–2009 ===
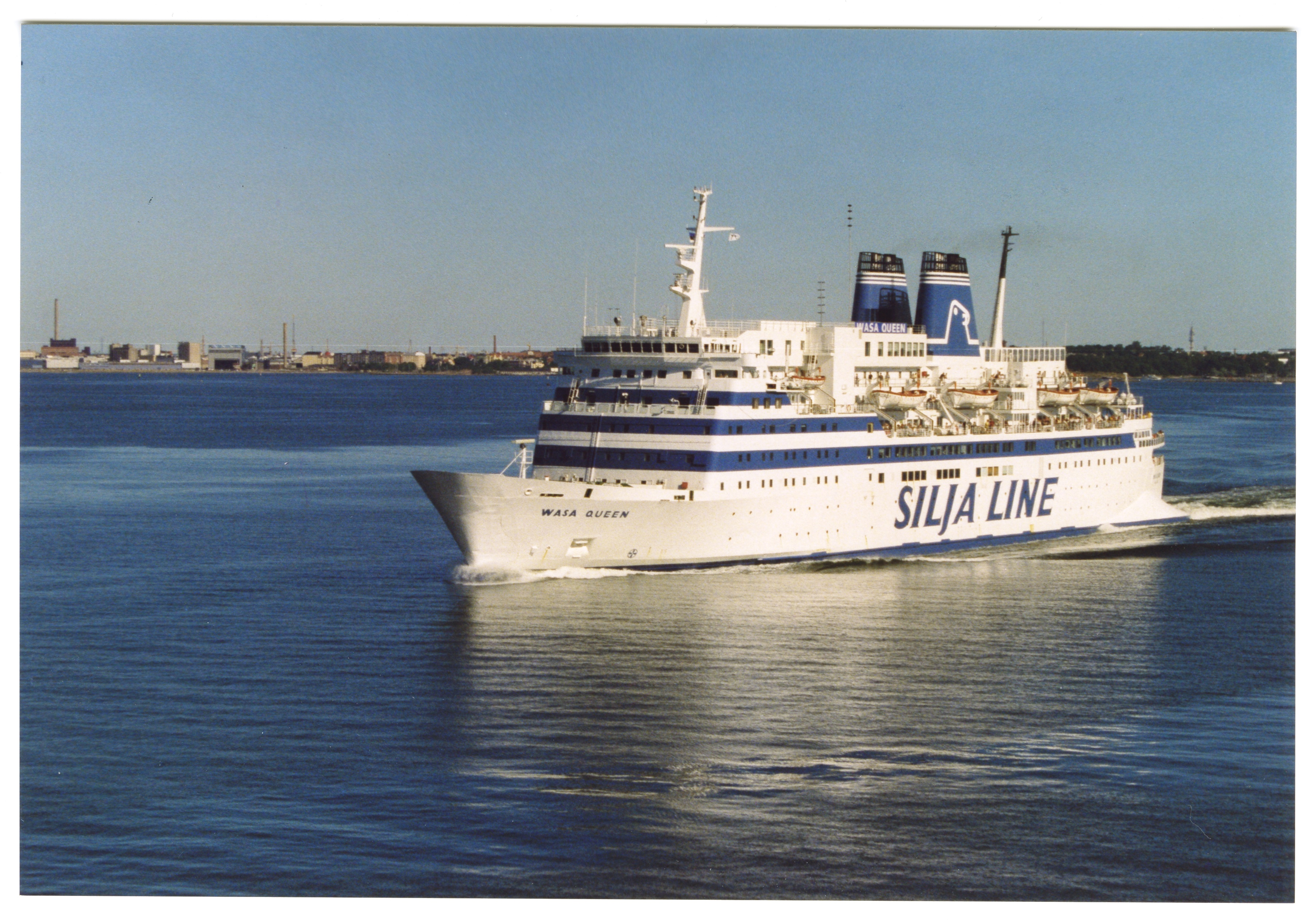
Wasa Queen in 1999

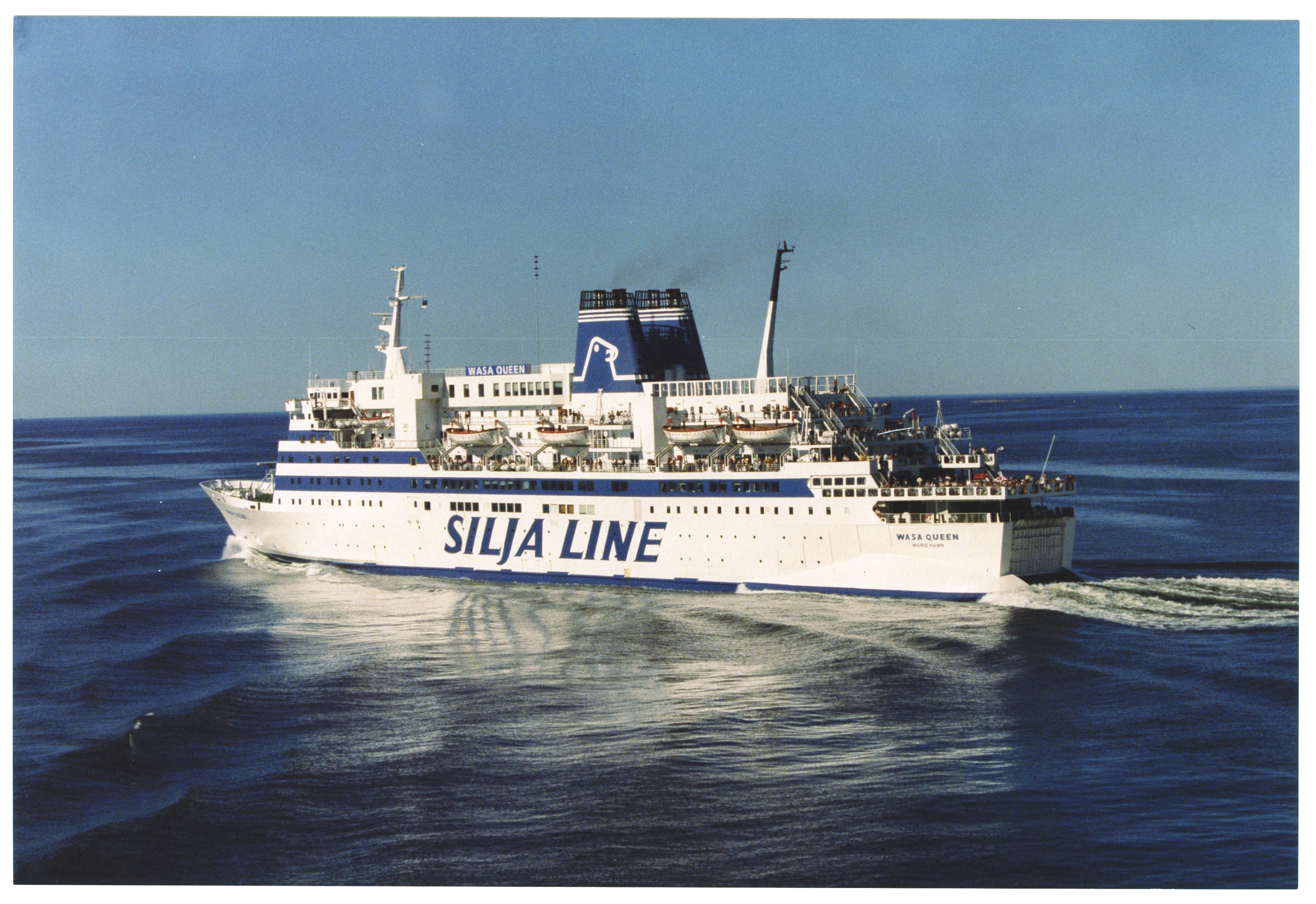
Wasa Queen in 1999

Between April and May 1992 the Orient Sun was rebuilt at Kotkan Telakka Oy, Kotka, Finland, for service on EffJohn's subsidiary Wasa Line. With the name MS Wasa Queen she started service between Vaasa in Finland and Sundsvall in Sweden on 15 May 1992. In addition to the Vaasa—Sundsvall route she also sailed from Vaasa to Umeå. In 1993 EffJohn reorganised their operations, merging Wasa Line into Silja Line. Wasa Queen was repainted in Silja Line's colours, but this time (somewhat surprisingly) her name wasn't changed, and she was kept on traffic from Vaasa. Many sources claim she was transferred to Silja Line on 31 December 1993, however a photograph showing her being painted in Silja Line colours in Vaasa harbour with MS Wasa King (which left Wasa Line fleet in January 1993) in the background suggests the Wasa Queen received Silja Line livery already in January 1993.

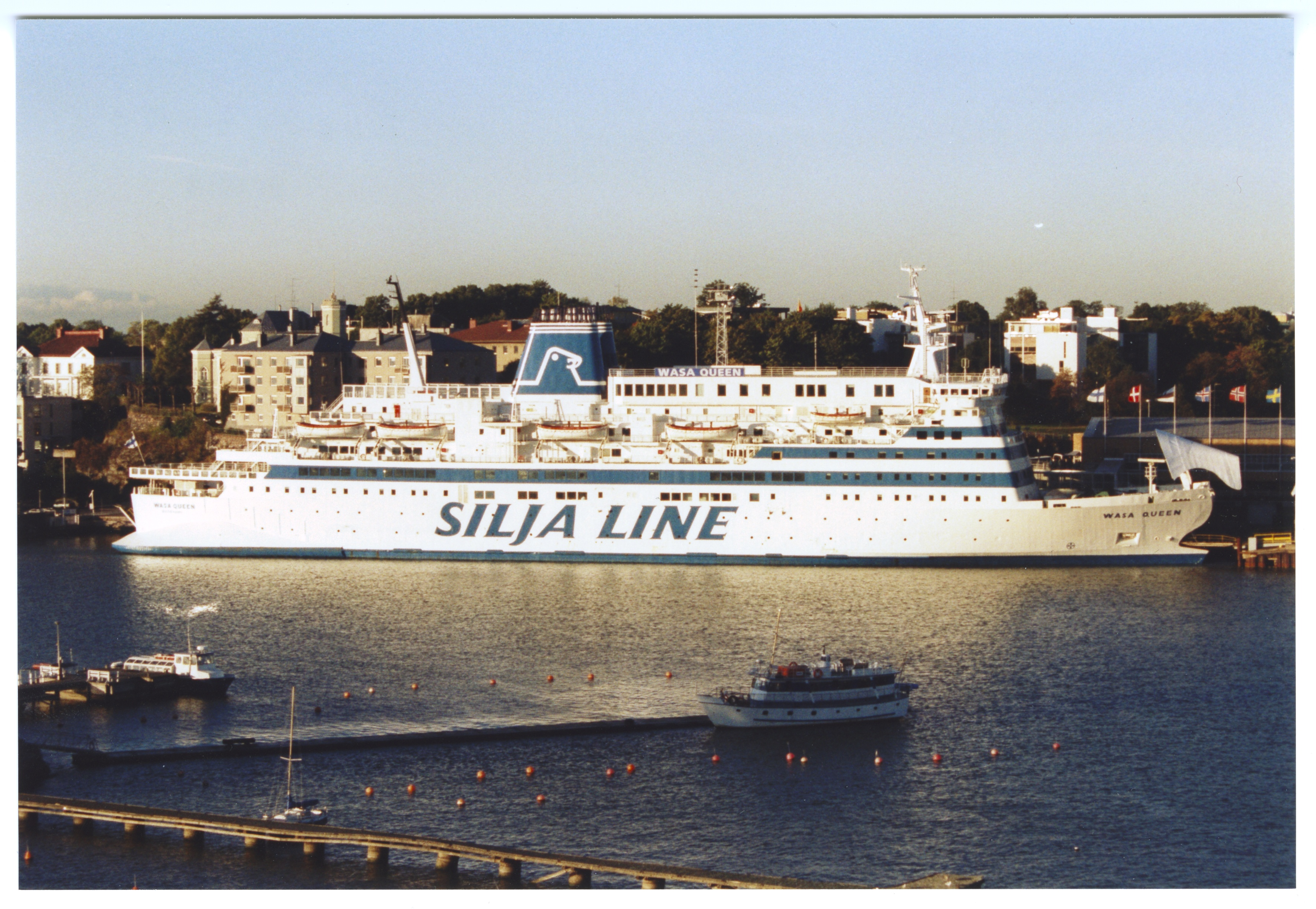
Wasa Queen in Helsinki

Profits on the lines from Vaasa were on the decline however, and between January and May 1996 Wasa Queen sailed on the fast-growing Helsinki—Tallinn route. For the summer season of 1996 she returned to Vaasa—Umeå service, but from September 1996 until September 1999 the Wasa Queen served continuously between Helsinki and Tallinn. During this time her timetables varied depending on whether she was the only Silja Line ship on the route or not. Until April 1997 she sailed alongside Silja Festival, with only one departure from each port per day. After Silja Festival stopped sailing on the route, Wasa Queen had two daily departures from each port. Starting from October 1997 GTS Finnjet spent the winter season sailing between Helsinki and Tallinn, and again during this time Wasa Queen had only one daily departure (during the times when Finnjet was on the route she also used Finnjet's terminal at Katajanokka, not Silja Line's normal Olympiaterminal).

In September 1999 Wasa Queen returned to sail from the city she was named after. During the same year tax free sales ended in traffic within the EU, meaning that most profits on the Vaasa—Umeå service disappeared. On 31 December 2000, Silja Line closed down traffic across kvarken completely, and Wasa Queen was laid up in Vaasa awaiting potential buyers. In July 2000 she was chartered as a hotel ship to the G8 meeting in Genoa. At the end of that charter, on 28 July, the ship was sold to Star Cruises and set sails for Singapore. In September 2000 she sailed for two weeks from Singapore under the banner of Star Cruises' new daughter company Cruise Ferries, after which she started traffic between Hong Kong and Xiamen.

However, the Hong Kong—Xiamen ferry route only operated briefly for a few months, after that she ended up sailing daily day cruises from Hong Kong to nowhere, departing in the morning and returning in the evening, for gambling purpose. In October 2004 she commenced sailing 6 overnight cruises per week in addition to the daily day cruises, bringing her departures to 13 per week. On 9 July 2007, Wasa Queen began making 12-hour casino cruises out of Port Klang, Malaysia. She was withdrawn from that service in October 2008 and subsequently laid up at Port Klang.

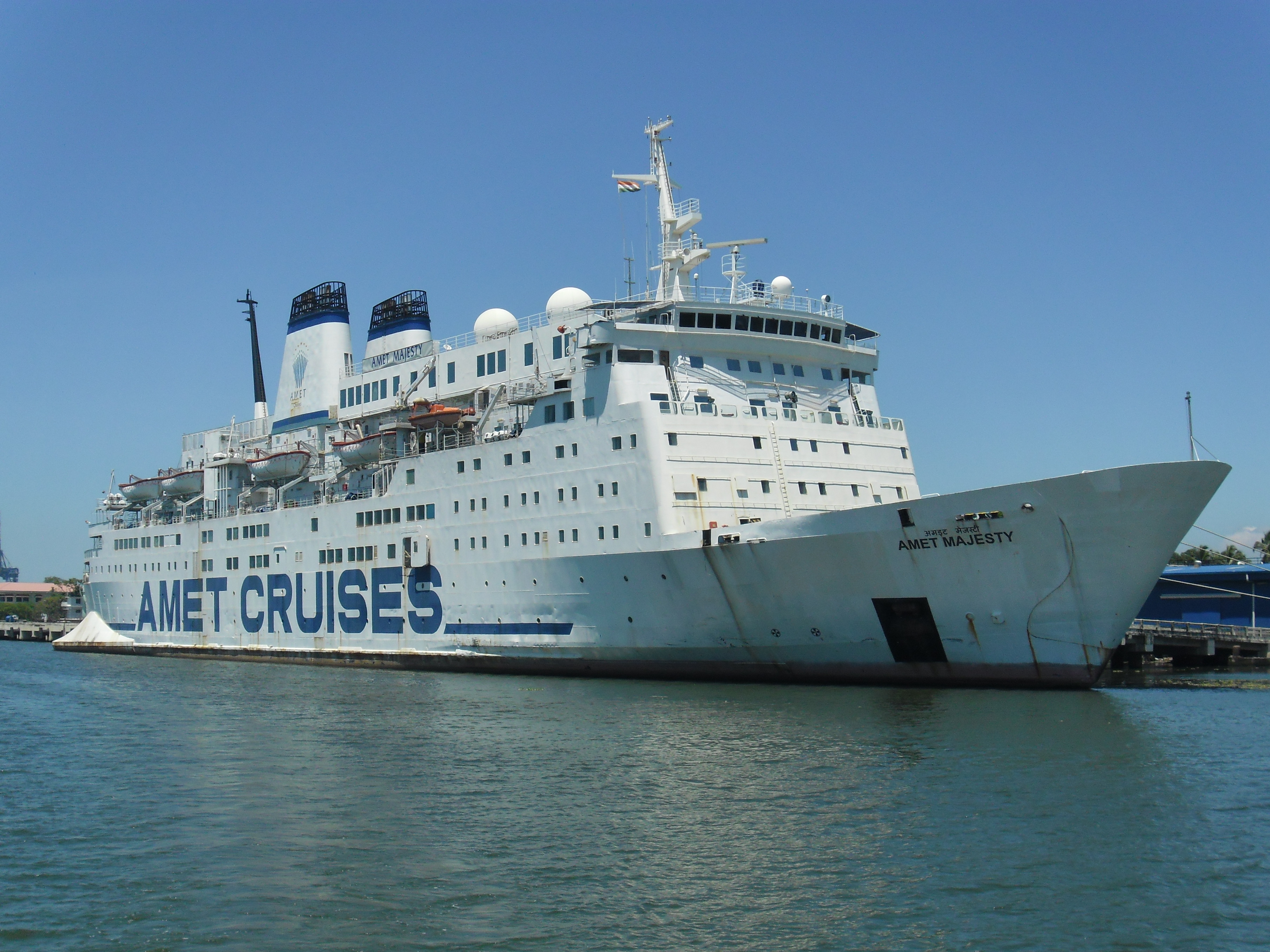
Amet Majesty

=== 2009–2013 ===
In April 2009 the Wasa Queen was sold to Chryses Finance Co. and renamed Arberia. In July of the same year she entered service on Ilion Lines' service connecting Trieste and Bari via Durrës.

=== 2011–2013 ===
AMET University bought it and renamed it to Amet Majesty. In May 2013 the ship was sold for scrap. The ship was broken up in Alang, India.
