= Rokkiporkkana =

Bridge in Helsinki, Finland

Coordinates: 60°9′32.68″N 24°54′57.56″E

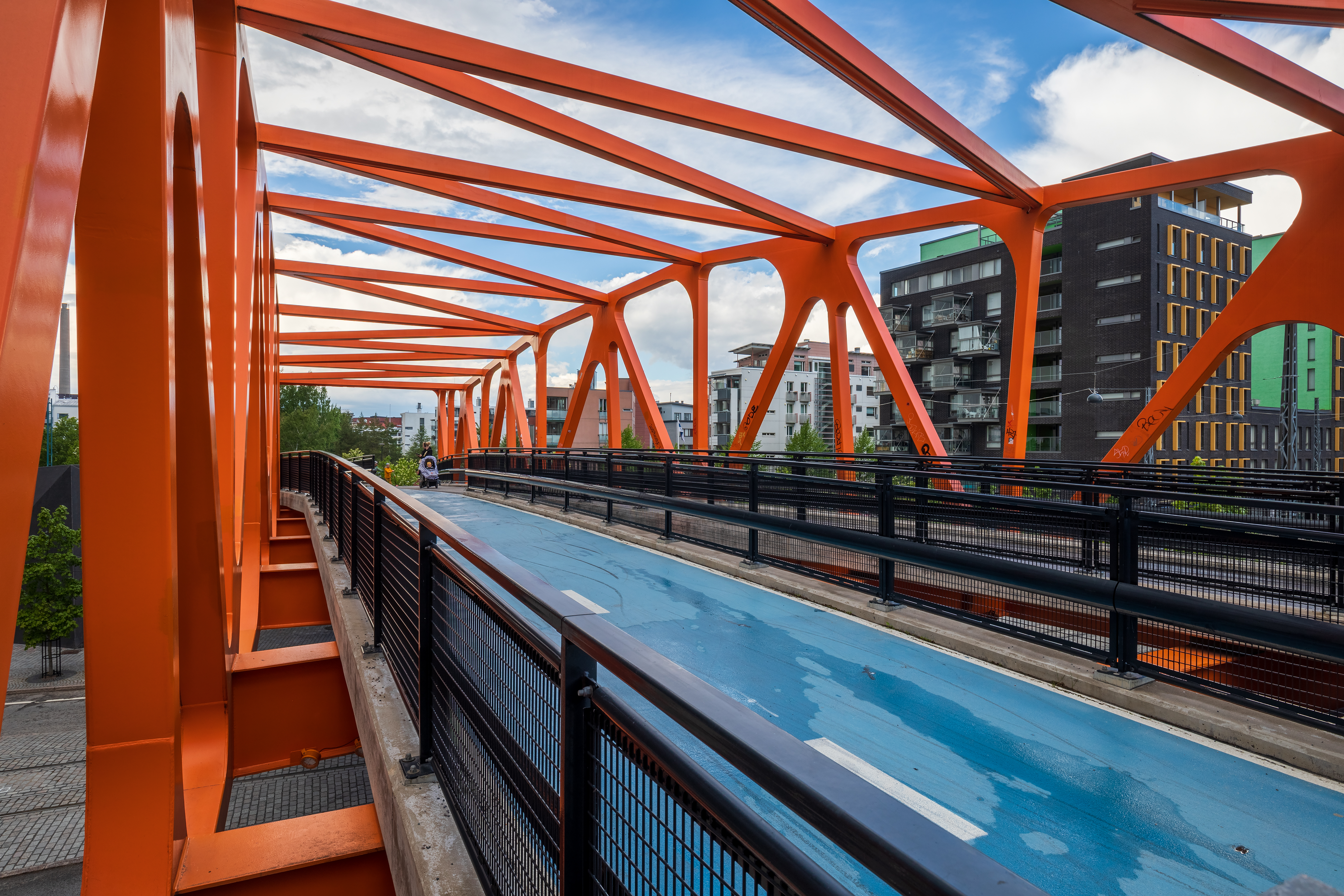
The Rokkiporkkana bridge in June 2022.

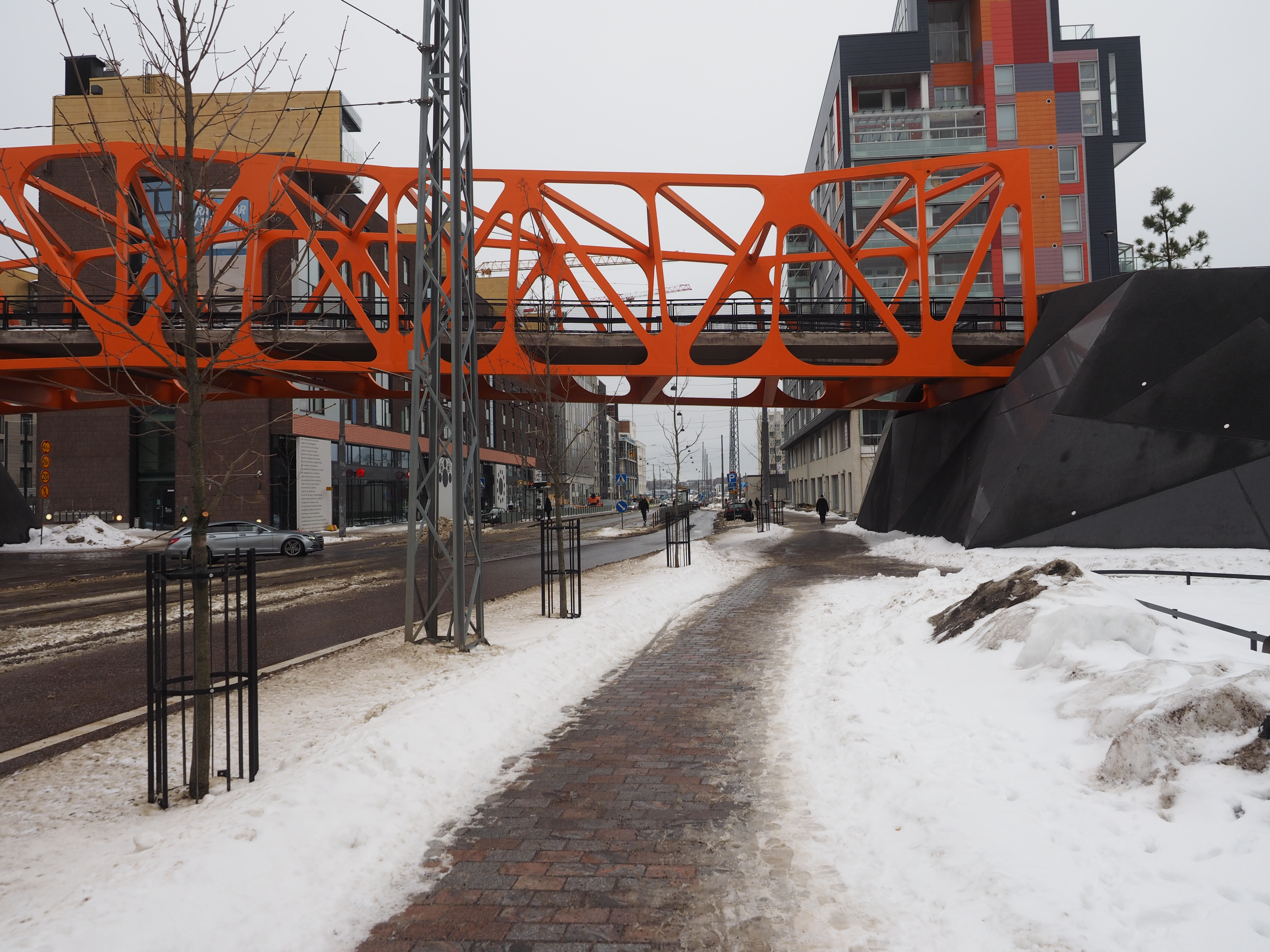
The Rokkiporkkana bridge viewed from Välimerenkatu in March 2021.

Rokkiporkkana (Finnish for "Rock and Roll Carrot") is a bridge in Jätkäsaari, Helsinki, Finland. The bridge is 44 metres long, made of steel and orange in colour. It is meant for bicycle and foot transport. It crosses the Välimerenkatu street and connects the parks Hyväntoivonpuisto and Selkämerenpuisto, enabling pedestrian transport between the residential blocks in Jätkäsaari and the Ruoholahti metro station.

The Rööriporkkana over the street Länsisatamankatu was opened for use on 31 October 2023. It is similar to Rokkiporkkana but a little shorter and narrower.

== Design ==
The bridge was designed by the architect bureau VSU maisema-arkkitehdit. The bridge reflects the colours and aesthetic of intermodal containers and container cranes reminiscent of the West Harbour. It is also part of the story of an "orc" living underneath the Hyväntoivonpuisto park, depicting the spine of the orc. The body of the bridge was built in Lithuania and transported by ship from Estonia in autumn 2016, and the bridge was inaugurated into use on 16 February 2018.

== See also ==
- Crusell Bridge
