= Jätkäsaari dumping site =

Unofficial dumping ground in Jätkäsaari, Helsinki

Coordinates: 60°09′17″N 024°55′07″E

The Jätkäsaari dumping site was an unofficial dumping ground in Jätkäsaari, Helsinki during 1930–44. The site is now part of the West Harbour of Helsinki. The place was never an official dumping ground, and it is not known for certain who exactly used it. It was used at least by private persons and companies, but possibly also by the City of Helsinki Sanitation Service.

== History ==
The construction of a harbour in this area began in 1913. The city wanted to expand the land area in the vicinity, and starting in the 1930s, it encouraged even its own residents to bring waste to Jätkäsaari so that more of the sea could be filled. The actual dumping site was located in Hietasaari, from the tip of the island towards the sea, but there were landfilling activities in other spots in the area as well. The location of this dumping site was a bit to the west of the current location of Verkkokauppa.com, beneath the asphalt field next to it.

The waste taken to the site consisted of surplus land, waste from demolished buildings, vegetables gone bad, ashes, paper waste, garden waste and landfill soil. The waste was dumped into the sea, the bottom of which consisted of layers of clay, and the landfill extended in places to a depth of 15 metres (49 ft). Among the waste, there are also 4 to 6 barges, with hulls 20 to 30 metres (66 to 98 ft) long. The composition of the waste is not typical of landfill sites.

In terms of the volume of traffic and goods, the harbour was the biggest one in Helsinki from the 1960s on, and it was expanded in the 1970s as well. Now, however, its freight functions have been moved to the Vuosaari Harbour.

== Restoration and investigations ==
Most of the former dumping site is located to the south of the first areas to be restored. The planning of the restoration work of the former dumping site has begun, and a special environmental permit has been sought for the restoration work.

Soil samples have been taken from 460 places with a total of 1360 samples having been obtained. The investigation of these samples has yielded more than 35,000 separate pieces of information. The topics that are most intensively researched are the concentrations of heavy metals, oil-based hydrocarbons, polycyclic aromatic hydrocarbons, and in some places the occurrence of asbestos.

Groundwater has been investigated from 15 observation and sample tubes and landfill gas in 20 separate points. Attention is paid to the physical characteristics of the groundwater and to the concentration of metals, oil-based hydrocarbons and polycyclic aromatic hydrocarbons.

A beach for swimmers has also been planned in the area. The microbiological qualities of the water between the future beach and the former dump have also been studied.

Samples of the sediments have been taken from 26 places. Physical qualities of the sediments have been studied, as well as the concentrations of heavy metals, oil-based hydrocarbons, polychlorinated biphenyls and polycyclic aromatic hydrocarbons.

It is known that metals have been found in the area in small quantities. It is also known that the dump has caused the contamination of the groundwater.

== The former dumping site today ==
The contaminated soil and the waste have been sealed off by a layer of asphalt for a long time. With the exception of the passenger terminal, the whole West Harbour of Helsinki is turning into a residential neighbourhood. The exact site of the former dumping site has been found unfit for development, as the landfill extends deep into the bottom of the sea. Soil contaminated with inorganic substances can be left under the blocks to be built with certain restrictions.

The soil must be restored in certain places, and the area that was filled with municipal solid waste (i.e. the dumping site) will be sealed off and secured at its current location, and a recreational and sports park will be constructed above it. The soil will be isolated from the plants so that the contaminants will not find their way to them. Certain areas in the park will be designated as the final disposal site of soil that is mildly polluted with inorganic compounds as a result of construction activities.

Before the finishing touches are given to the sports park, insulation, gas collection and protective layers will be built on the site. On the edges of the landfill, it is also possible to substitute clean soil for polluted soil.

A cross-section of the dumping site has been published in the city plan for the area, on page 48. From the diagram, one can find the depths and pollutants that were studied and their amounts in rough terms.
