= Pihlajasaari =

Two islands in Helsinki, Finland

Coordinates: 60°08′15″N 24°54′50″E

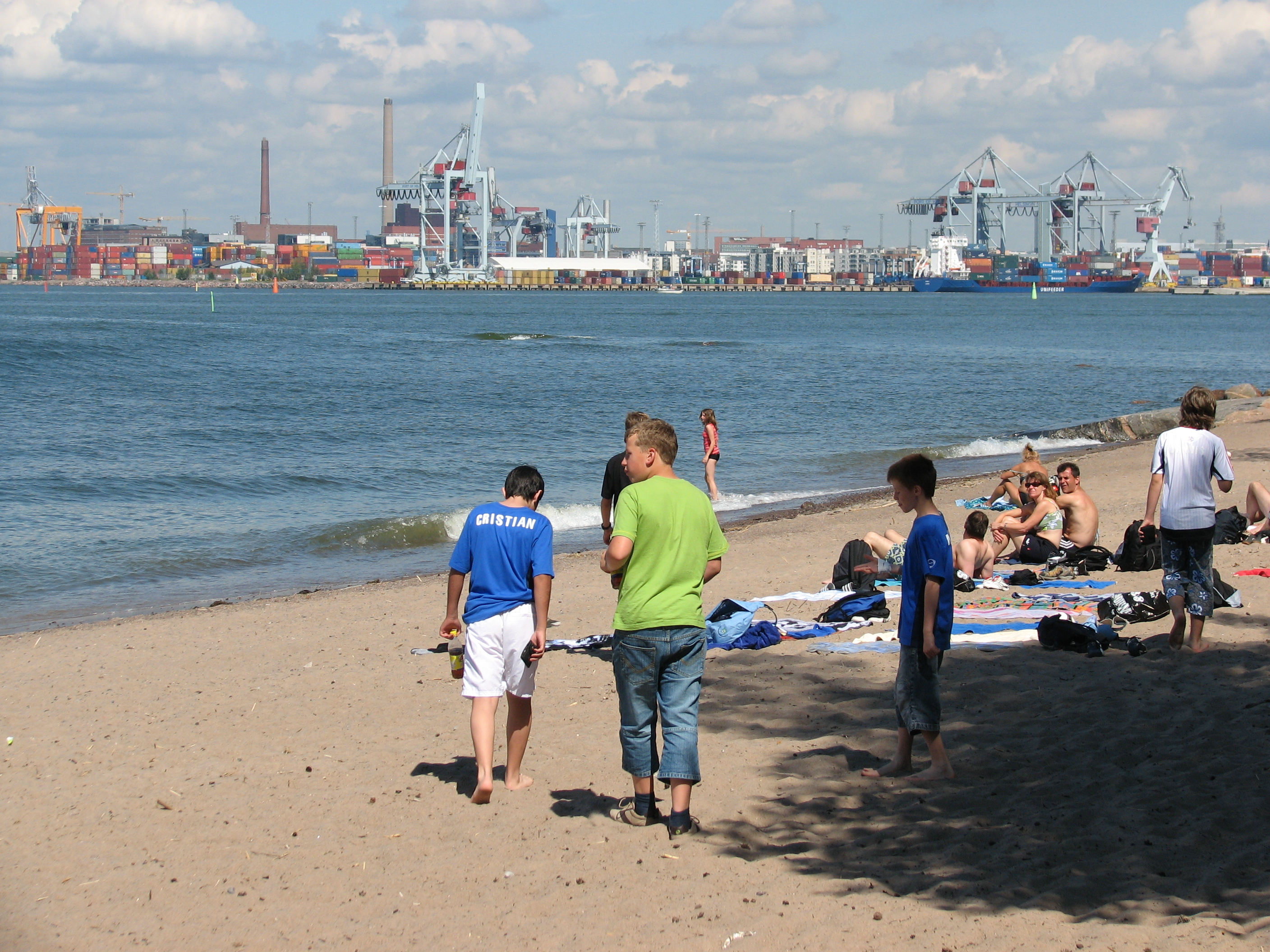
The main beach of Pihlajasaari is just opposite the Port of Helsinki and the Helsinki New Shipyard.

Pihlajasaari (Rönnskär in Swedish) is an island group and outdoor recreational area in Helsinki, Finland, located off the district of Hernesaari in the city's southern archipelago.

Pihlajasaari consists of two separate islands connected with a bridge. It operates mostly as a holiday beach resort and has no permanent residents.

== Access ==
Pihlajasaari is reachable by boat. In the summer, passenger waterbuses operated by JT-Line run from Merisatama (Kaivopuisto) and Ruoholahti in central Helsinki to the island several times per day, with a crossing time of about ten minutes. There is also a visitors’ marina with berth spaces for private boats; the city advises against landing elsewhere on the island because of exposed rocks and safety concerns.

== Geography ==
Pihlajasaari is characterised by a mixture of sandy beaches, rocky shorelines, herb-rich groves and coastal forest. Much of the shoreline is made up of smooth glaciated rocks, while the main public swimming beach on the western island is a shallow sandy beach several hundred metres long that is especially popular with families.

The City of Helsinki maintains a marked nature trail, around 2–3 kilometres in length, which runs across both main islands and passes through rocky seashore, forest and herb-rich vegetation. Parts of the forest on Pihlajasaari are protected as a small nature reserve because of their herb-rich ground flora and birdlife.

== Recreation ==
=== Beaches and naturist beach ===
The western island has a public sandy beach and several smaller swimming places, along with rocky headlands used for sunbathing and picnicking. Pihlajasaari is frequently described in local media and tourism material as one of Helsinki’s most popular summer islands because of its combination of beaches, varied terrain and services.

Eastern Pihlajasaari includes a designated unisex (naturist) nudist beach, separated from other areas of the shore. National and local media list Pihlajasaari as one of Finland’s two official naturist beaches, alongside Yyteri in the city of Pori and several other locations. A feature article from Finland’s official country portal notes that the naturist beach at Pihlajasaari is unisex, in contrast to the gender-segregated naturist areas at Seurasaari, and that its rocky shoreline makes it more suitable for sunbathing than for swimming.

=== Facilities and services ===
Pihlajasaari has a range of visitor facilities, including cooking shelters, picnic areas, saunas, a kiosk and café, and Restaurant Pihlajasaari, which operates in a former villa building near the main pier. The island’s past as a villa district is visible in the remaining historic villas scattered among the forests and along the shoreline. Camping is permitted for a fee at a designated campsite on Eastern Pihlajasaari; camping elsewhere on the islands is not allowed.

Yle and other Finnish media describe Pihlajasaari as a popular day-trip destination for residents and tourists. Summer feature articles highlight its combination of sandy beaches, rocky outcrops, restaurant and saunas, and note that ferries can be crowded on warm days.

== Environment ==
In 2013, large quantities of construction waste, including fibreglass debris, washed ashore on Pihlajasaari’s beaches from harbour works at Jätkäsaari. The Helsinki Environment Centre concluded that the pollution violated Finland’s Waste Act and identified municipal bodies responsible for the clean-up. The incident received national environmental press coverage and prompted clean-up measures on the island’s shores.

== See also ==
- List of islands of Finland
- Yyteri
- Seurasaari
