= Helsinki harbour tunnel =

Proposed road tunnel

The Helsinki harbour tunnel is a proposed road tunnel connecting Port of Helsinki's West Harbour to the Länsiväylä highway. The 1.9-kilometre (1.2 mi) tunnel would alleviate congestion the harbour causes in Jätkäsaari, as the port plans to move all ferry traffic to Tallinn from Katajanokka Terminal to the West Harbour and close the South Harbour entirely.

The zoning plan permitting the construction of the tunnel was approved by the Helsinki city council in a vote in December 2025. The tunnel is estimated to cost €320 million and would be paid by the city-owned Port of Helsinki.
