= Hernesaari =

Coordinates: 60°09′N 24°56′E

Hernesaari Ärtholmen
- Helsinki Subdivision
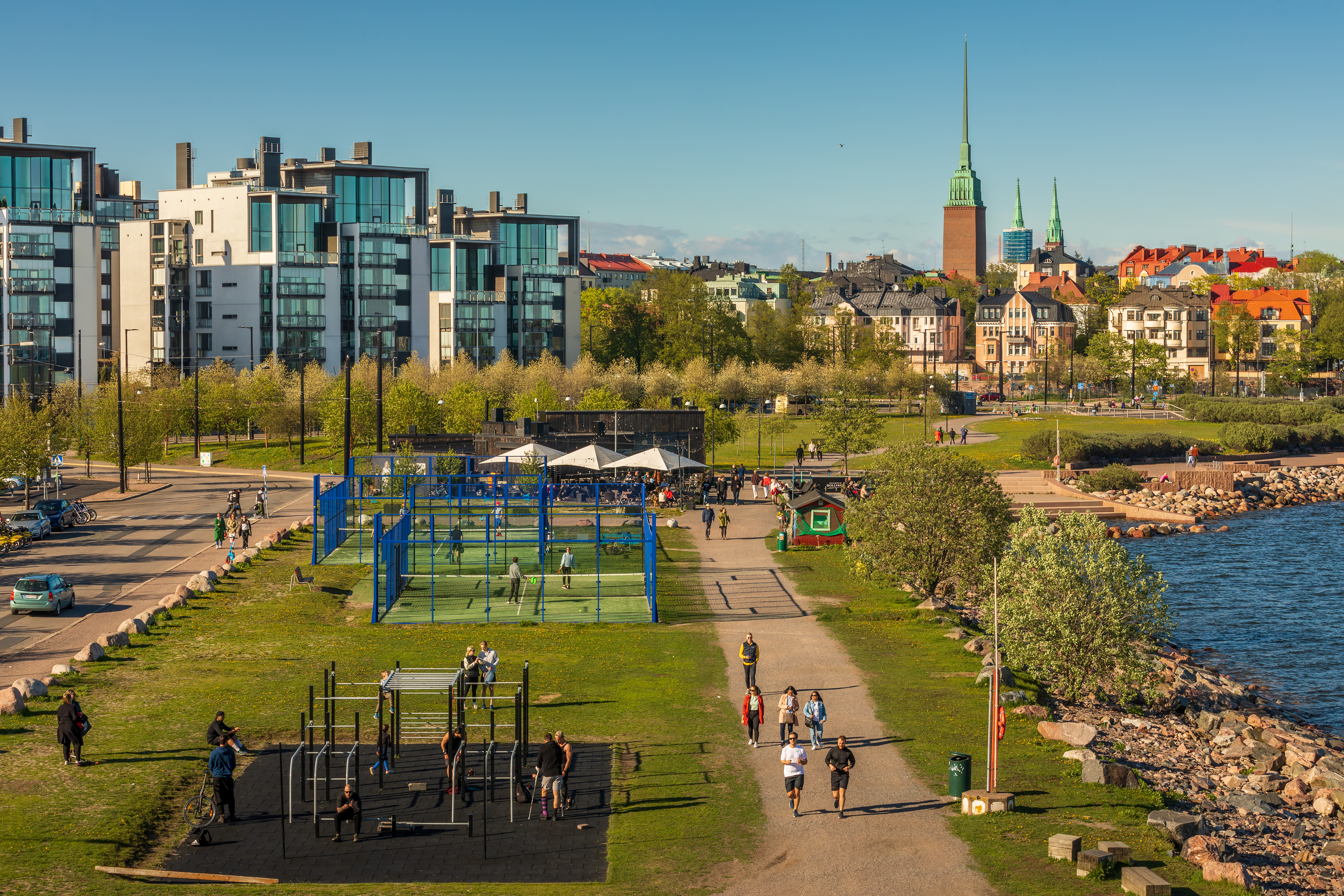
- View towards St. Birgit Park (Pyhän Birgitan puisto) at Hernesaarenranta in Hernesaari in May 2022.

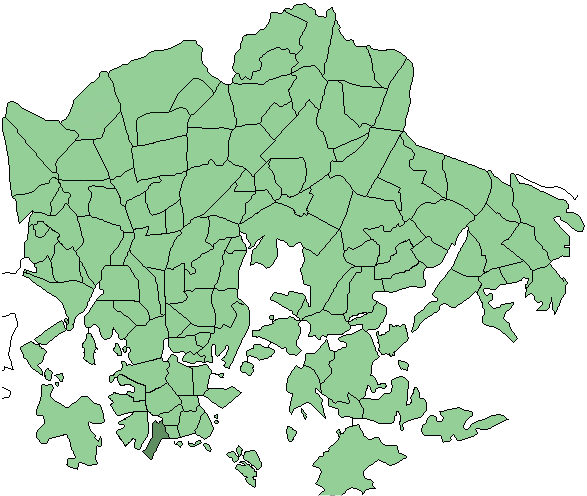
- Position of Hernesaari within Helsinki
- Country: Finland
- Region: Uusimaa
- Sub-region: Greater Helsinki
- Municipality: Helsinki
- District: Southern
- Area: 0.49 km^{2} (0.19 sq mi)
- Population: 762
  - Density: 1,555/km^{2} (4,030/sq mi)
- Postal codes: 00150
- Subdivision number: 204
- Neighbouring subdivisions: Punavuori, Eira, Länsisaaret, Jätkäsaari, Länsisatama

Hernesaari (Finnish: [ˈhernesˌsɑːri]; Swedish: Ärtholmen) is a subarea of the Länsisatama district in the southernmost part of Helsinki. It consists of the peninsula west of Eira and the former islands of Munkkisaari and Hernesaari, which have been connected to it by land reclamation. Administratively, Hernesaari belongs to the Ullanlinna basic district, which in turn is part of the broader Southern major district of Helsinki.

The subarea was named Munkkisaari until the beginning of 2013, when the City Board decided to rename it Hernesaari.

East of Hernesaari are Eira and Punavuori. The boundary with them is Telakkakatu, whose median carried the Helsinki harbor railway until 2008. To the west, on the far side of Hietalahti, lies Jätkäsaari, which, like Hernesaari, is part of the Länsisatama district. At the base of the peninsula is a small apartment-block area named Eiranranta, based on a detailed plan approved in 2004, with a street of the same name running past it. Off Hernesaari lie the Pihlajasaari islands, popular in summer, which belong to the Länsisaaret subarea. Hernesaari contains the southernmost point on Helsinki’s mainland. It is also the southernmost point of Helsinki’s inner city, although the southern tip of Lauttasaari extends even farther south.

== History ==
The original Hernesaari was a rocky island in the southern part of the present subarea. The island is known to have been leased as summer grazing for cattle as early as the early 18th century, and it was also used by fishermen. In the early 20th century, the area had dwellings, outbuildings, and pier structures, which were later demolished to make way for port and shipyard operations. Illegal liquor trade took place on the island during Prohibition in 1919-1932, and the temperance department of the Ministry of Social Affairs asked the City of Helsinki to take measures to end the trade in spirits.

== See also ==
- Hietalahti shipyard
- Jätkäsaari
