= Clarion Hotel Helsinki =

Hotel in Jätkäsaari, Helsinki, Finland

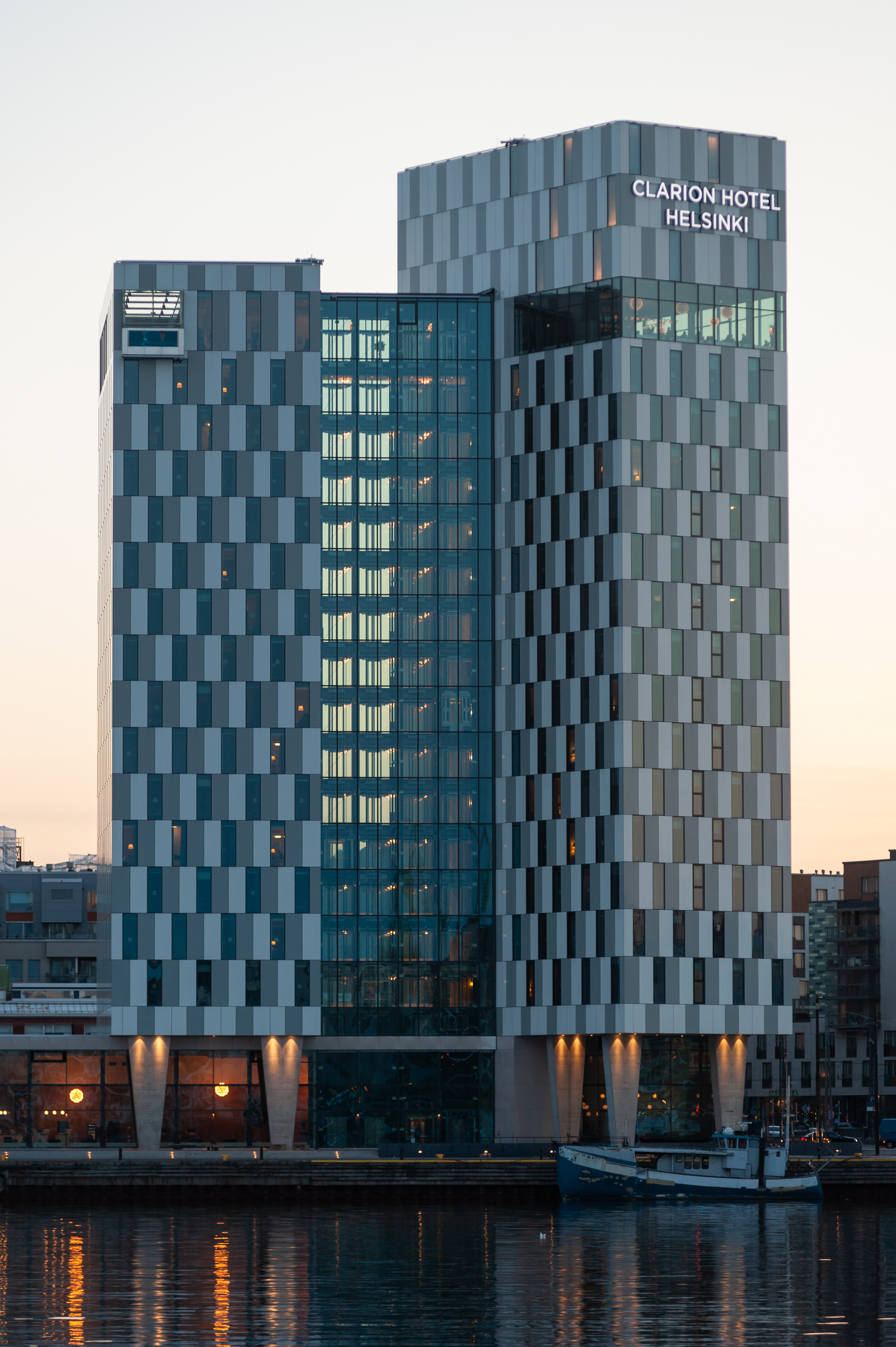

General information
- Status: Completed
- Address: Tyynenmerenkatu 2
- Town or city: Helsinki
- Country: Finland
- Coordinates: 60°09′35″N 24°55′19″E
- Elevation: 78 m
- Opened: 17 November 2016
- Owner: Nordic Choice Hotels

Technical details
- Floor count: 16

Design and construction
- Architect(s): Arkkitehdit Davidsson Tarkela Oy

Clarion Hotel Helsinki is a hotel in the Jätkäsaari district of Helsinki, Finland, opened on 17 October 2016. The building has 16 floors, is 78 metres (256 ft) tall and has 425 hotel rooms as well as 15 convention and event rooms. The top floor contains a gym, a sauna and a rooftop pool. The building was commissioned by the Norwegian building millionaire Arthur Burchardt. The hotel is managed by the Nordic hotel chain Strawberry and is the chain's first hotel in Finland. Strawberry is a franchising partner of the international Choice Hotels chain, owned by the Norwegian "hotel magnate" and environmental activist Petter Stordalen.

Of the two 16-floor towers in the hotel one has an interior decoration with a light Finnish style and the other has one with an international darker style.

The protected harbour warehouse building designed by Lars Sonck, located next to the building, was renovated into a convention centre.
