= Crusell Bridge =

Bridge in Helsinki, Finland

Coordinates: 60°09′38″N 24°54′30″E

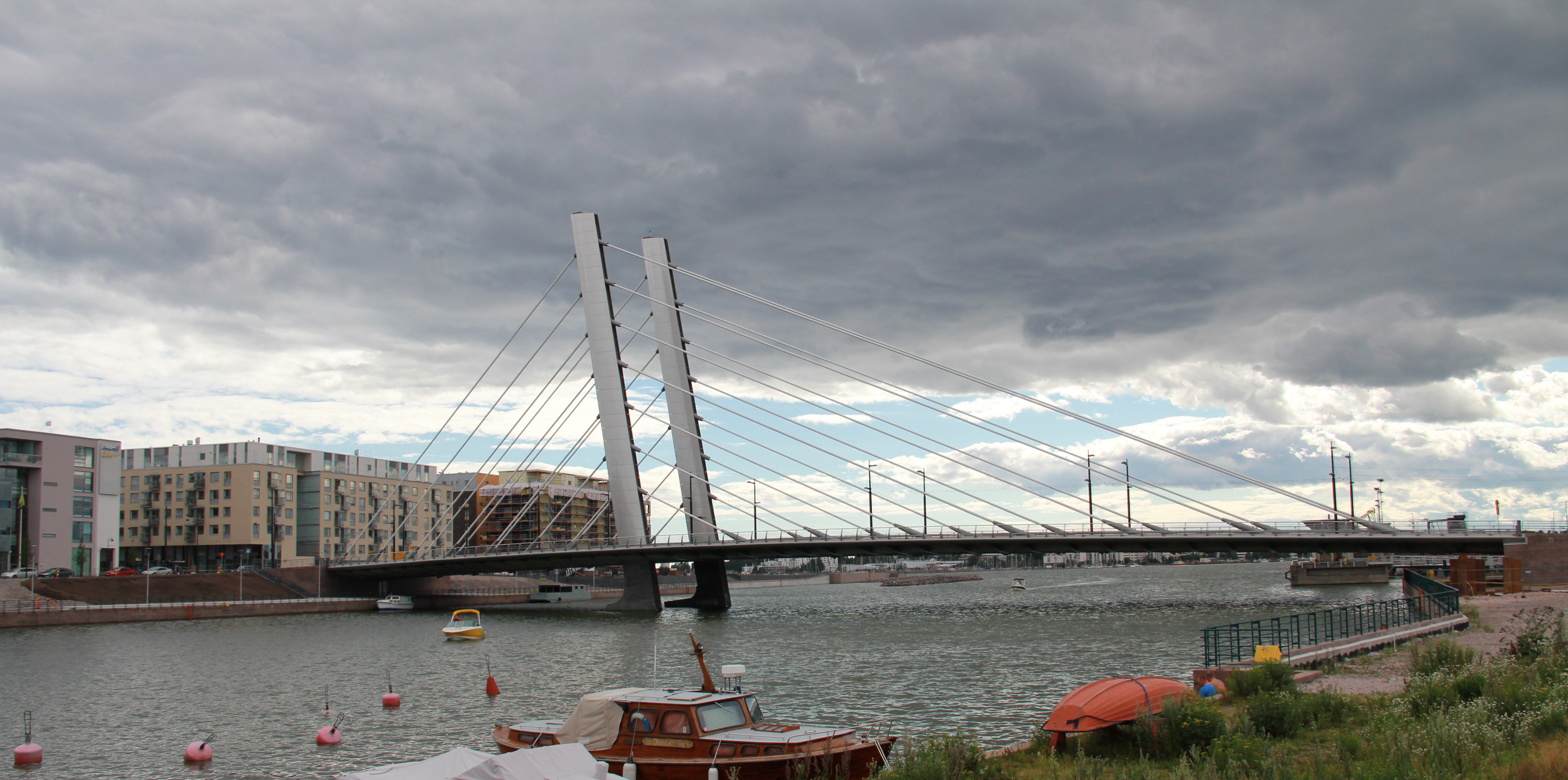
The bridge viewed from Ruoholahti towards the sea.

The Crusell Bridge (Finnish: Crusellinsilta, Swedish: Crusellbron) is a bridge in the Länsisatama district of Helsinki, Finland, crossing the Ruoholahti bay in the Baltic Sea, about 24.8 metres wide and connecting the Ruoholahti and Jätkäsaari neighbourhoods. The bridge is a 173.4 metre long cable-stayed bridge, used by light traffic, automobile traffic and the Helsinki tram line 8. The bridge was inaugurated on 14 June 2011 by Mayor Jussi Pajunen. The bridge has been named after the Finnish composer and clarinet player Bernhard Henrik Crusell.

== Measurements and construction ==
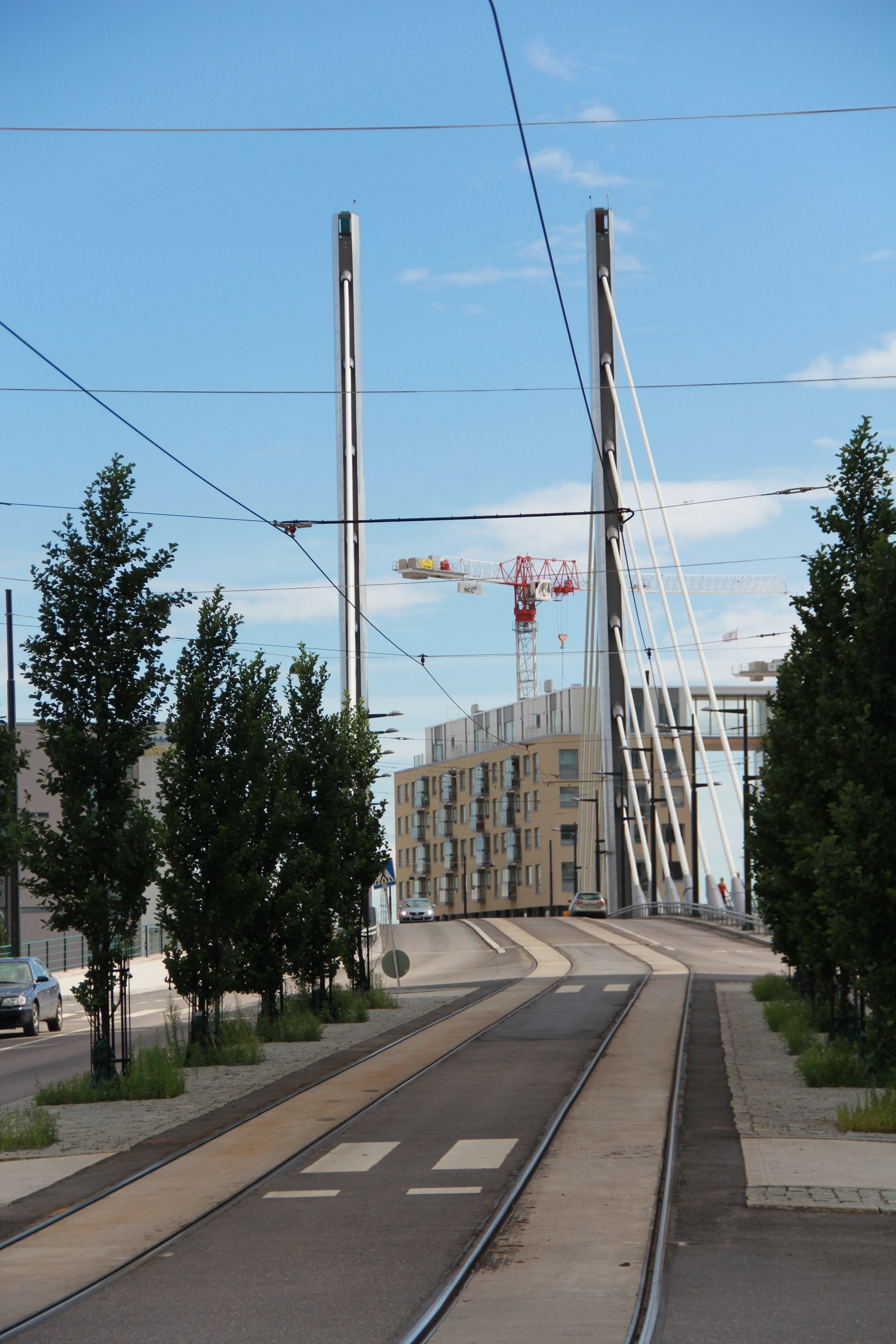
The bridge as seen from Ruoholahti.

The bridge is an asymmetric cable-stayed bridge with two openings. Its total length is 173.5 metres, the main stay is 92 metres, the Jätkäsaari-side stay is 51.5 metres and the width of the bridge is 24.8 metres. The bridge has light traffic ways on both sides, two lanes for automobile traffic and tram tracks in both directions in the middle. The pylon is made of steel and inclined, and its top is at a height of 49 metres from the sea surface. The supporting structure of the bridge is a tensioned concrete slab, on the side the bridge is a joined construction. The bridge has special lighting. The appearance of the bridge is meant for airiness and lightness.

The bridge was designed by WSP Finland with Pekka Pulkkinen as the lead designer. It was constructed by Skanska Infra and the construction cost 17.7 million euro.

== Design competition ==
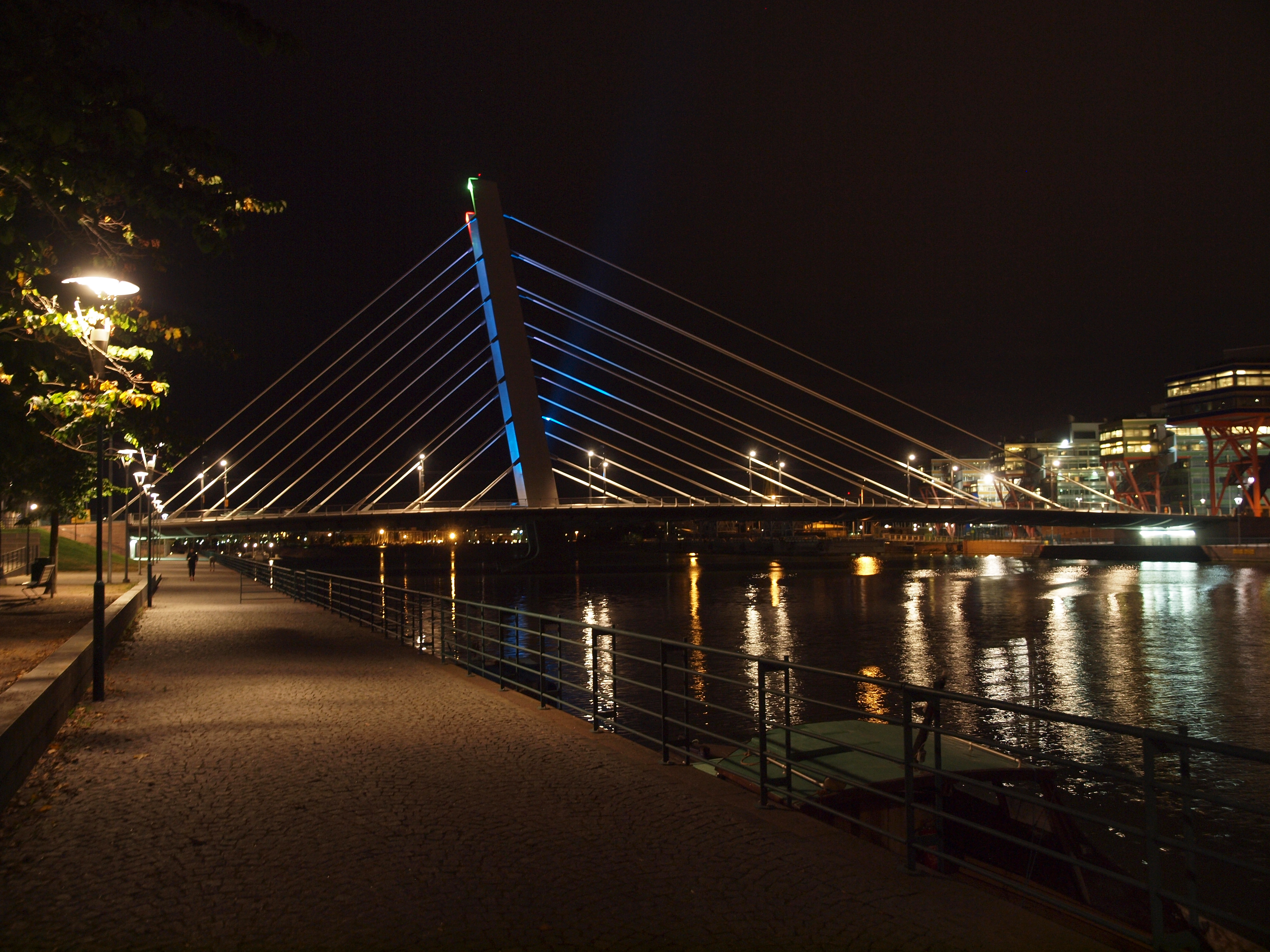
The Crusell Bridge is illuminated at night time.

A design competition was held for the construction of the bridge, and it was resolved in spring 2002 and won by a bridge design by the British architect Ian P. T. Firth. However, the design was not viewed as realisable because of economic reasons. Three designs from two Finnish design studios were chosen for later review. The winning entry was a design by the name of Merimiekat by the studio SuunnitteluKortes. WSP Group bought SuunnitteluKortes in 2004.
