= Länsisaaret =

Länsisaaret (in Finnish) Västra holmarna (in Swedish)
- Neighborhood of Helsinki
- Interactive map of Länsisaaret (in Finnish); Västra holmarna (in Swedish)
- Country: Finland
- Province: Southern Finland
- Region: Uusimaa
- Sub-region: Helsinki
- Time zone: UTC+2 (EET)
  - Summer (DST): UTC+3 (EEST)

Länsisaaret (Swedish: Västra holmarna) is a southeastern neighborhood of Helsinki, Finland.
