= Verkkokauppa.com =

Finnish retail business

Verkkokauppa.com Oyj
- Company type: Public limited company
- Traded as: Nasdaq Helsinki: VERK
- Industry: Retail
- Founded: 11 March 1992; 34 years ago
- Founder: Samuli Seppälä
- Headquarters: Helsinki, Finland
- Key people: Panu Porkka, CEO; Mikko Forsell, CFO; Arja Talma, Chairman
- Products: Consumer goods
- Revenue: ▲EUR 554 million (2020)
- Number of employees: 818 (2020)
- Website: verkkokauppa.com

Verkkokauppa.com Oyj is a Finnish online retailer located in Jätkäsaari, Helsinki. The company sells its products through its four megastores and over 2500 pickup locations in Finland, and is also home delivered and installed. The company was established in 1992 and it has over 800 employees in four locations. Verkkokauppa.com is trading under ticker VERK at OMX NASDAQ First North.

The company has over 70,000 articles in its selection from over 1,000 manufacturers and 25 main product groups. It sells computers, mobile phones, digital cameras, bicycles, white and brown goods, toys, accessories, components, grills, and pet supplies among others. The company also has over 250 private label brands and over 1,000 private label products.

The company's revenue was EUR 554 million in 2020, €431 million in 2017, €238 million in 2013, €225 million in 2012, €187 million in 2011, €173 million in 2010, €153 million in 2009, and €139 million in 2008. Verkkokauppa.com was founded in 1992 and it has more than 800 employees in four locations. The company's name "Verkkokauppa" literally means webstore in English. The company's current slogan is "Probably always cheaper".

Verkkokauppa.com was declared as Finland's most usable web shop by Adage in 2006 and chosen as the best webstore in Finland in 2010 by TNS Gallup. Verkkokauppa.com was Finland's 3rd most known online-brand after Google and Facebook in 2013 by Taloustutkimus.

In 2019, RichRelevance named the company the leading innovator in personalization.

== Shop-in-shop ==
Verkkokauppa.com has shop-in-shops or concept stores for ASUS, Microsoft, Sony, EA, TomTom, Nokia, Belkin, Western Digital, Acer, Intel, Apple, Canon, Gardena, HP, LG, Logitech, Sennheiser and Samsung.

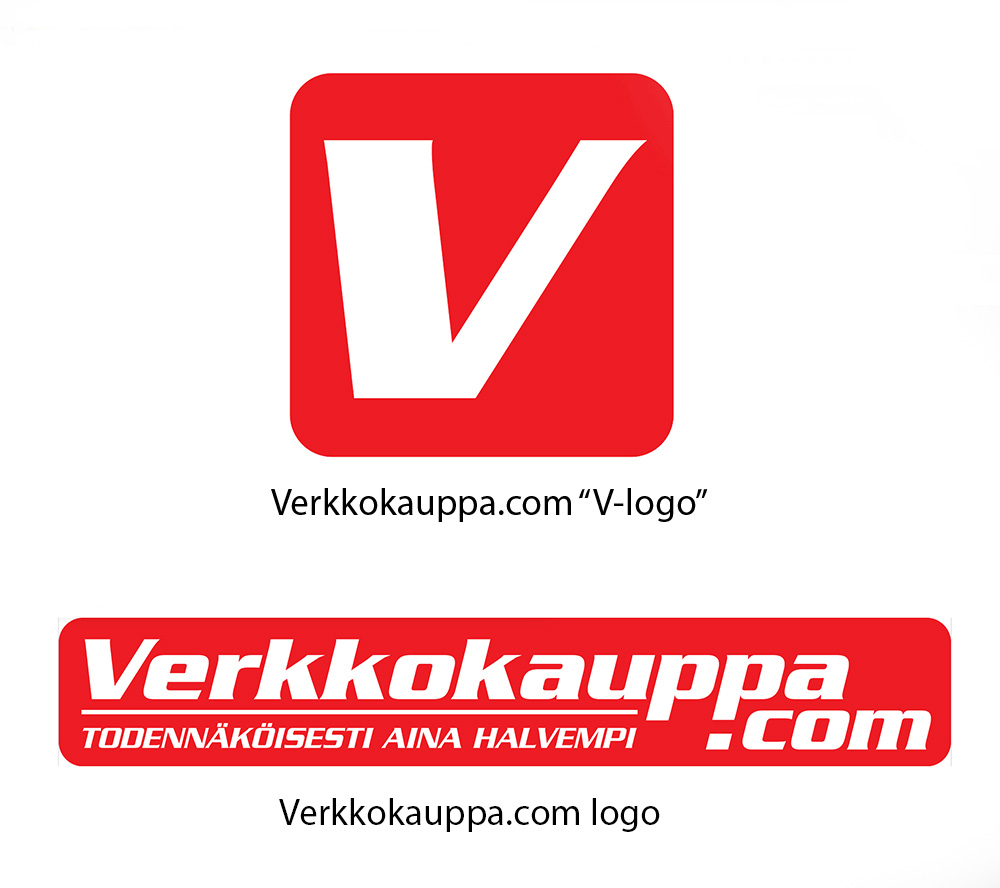
Verkkokauppa.com company logo.

== Sources ==
- Adage Usability study 2006
- Taloustutkimus Online-brands study 2013
- Verkkokauppa.com's Prospectus 2014
