= Jätkäsaari =

Area of Helsinki in Uusimaa, Finland

Jätkäsaari Busholmen
- Helsinki Subdivision
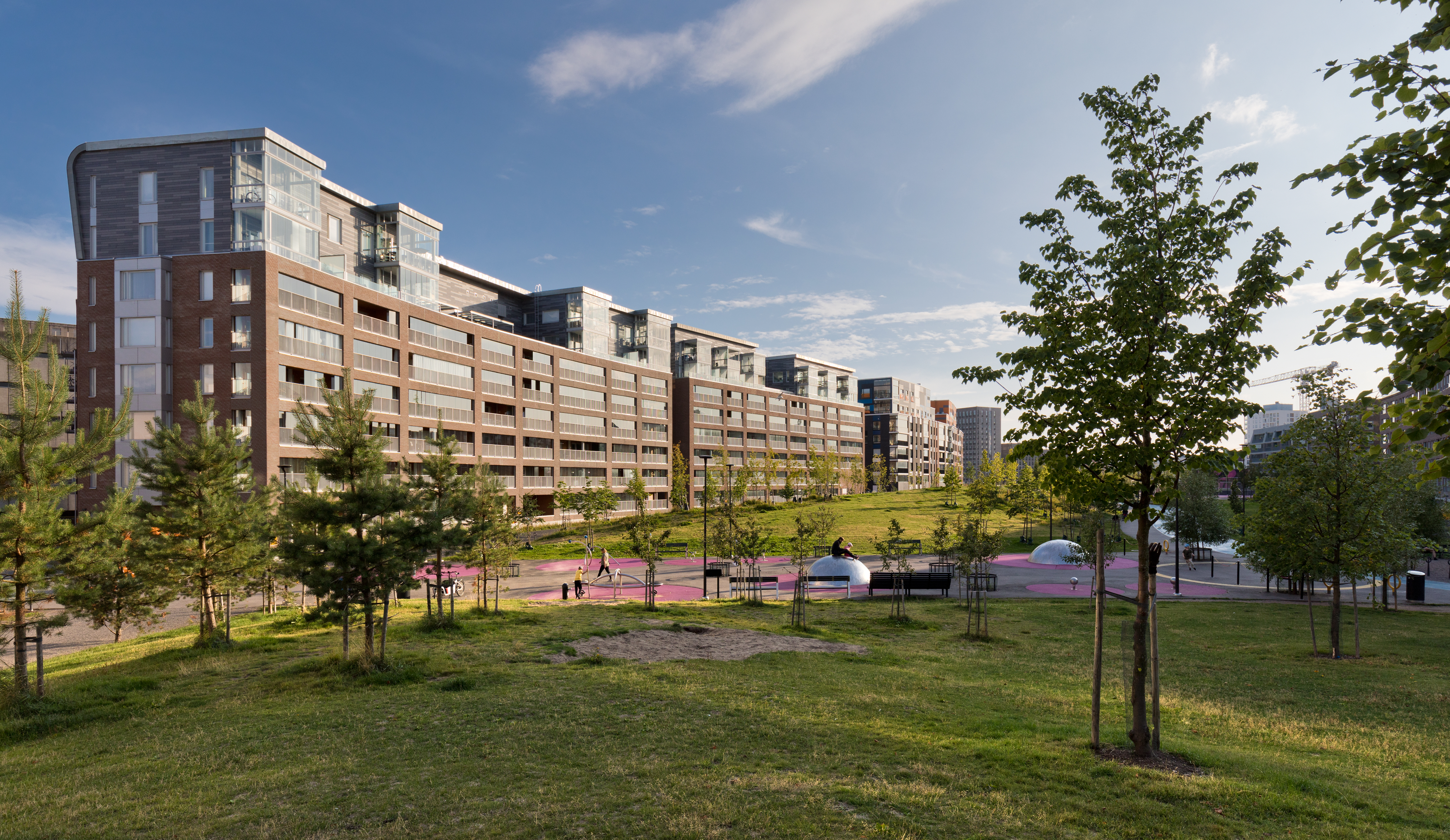
- Hyväntoivonpuisto park in Jätkäsaari

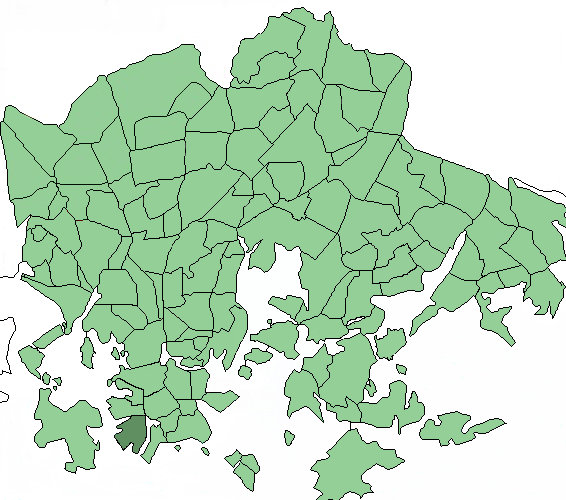
- Position of Jätkäsaari within Helsinki
- Coordinates: 60.15524°N 24.911714°E
- Country: Finland
- Region: Uusimaa
- Sub-region: Greater Helsinki
- Municipality: Helsinki
- District: Southern
- Area: 1.16 km^{2} (0.45 sq mi)
- Population (2022-12-31): 14 718
- Postal codes: 00180, 00220
- Neighbouring subdivisions: Ruoholahti; Punavuori; Munkkisaari; Lauttasaari

Jätkäsaari (Finnish: [ˈjætkæˌsɑːri]; Swedish: Busholmen) is a peninsula and a quarter in Helsinki, the capital city of Finland. It is part to the Kampinmalmi district and Länsisatama neighbourhood. It was the site of the main container port in Helsinki until late 2008, when the harbour moved to the new facilities in Vuosaari. The terminals for passenger ferries to Tallinn remain in Jätkäsaari at the West Harbour.

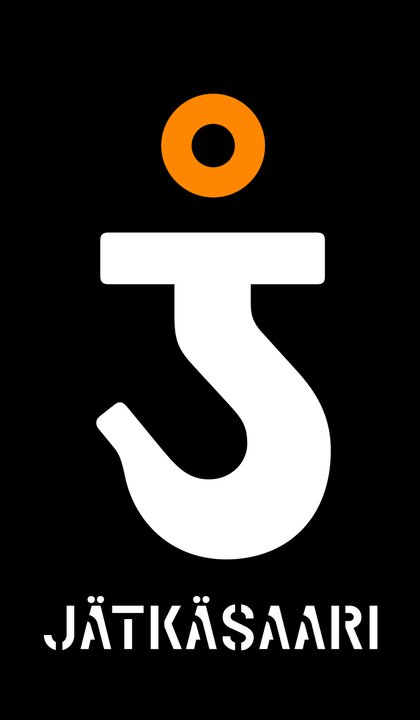
The logo of Jätkäsaari resembles a stylised hook of a harbour crane, with a connotation to the letter "J". The logo was designed by the Helsinki-based design company BOTH.

What is now known as Jätkäsaari (literally Docker Island in Finnish), was originally a group of four islands: Jätkäsaari (Busholm), Hietasaari (Sandholm), Saukko (Uttern) and tiny Saukonkari. The sea between the islands and the continent was filled, creating a peninsula to house harbour facilities. The area became an island once more with the construction of the Ruoholahti Canal. With most of the harbour operations having moved to the new Vuosaari Harbour, the construction of a new mixed-use city district began in late 2009, after a clean-up of contaminated soil was completed.

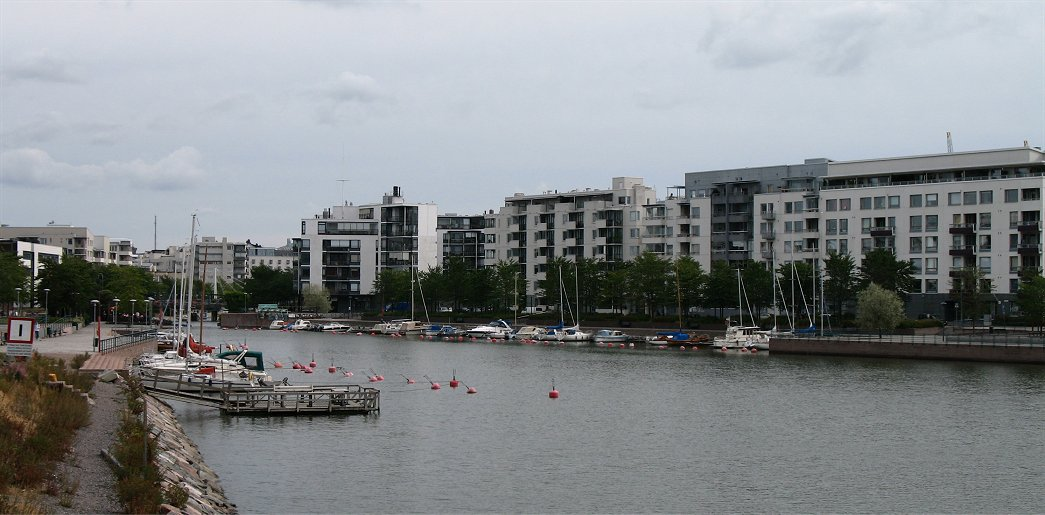
The Ruoholahti Canal, with Jätkäsaari on the right hand side

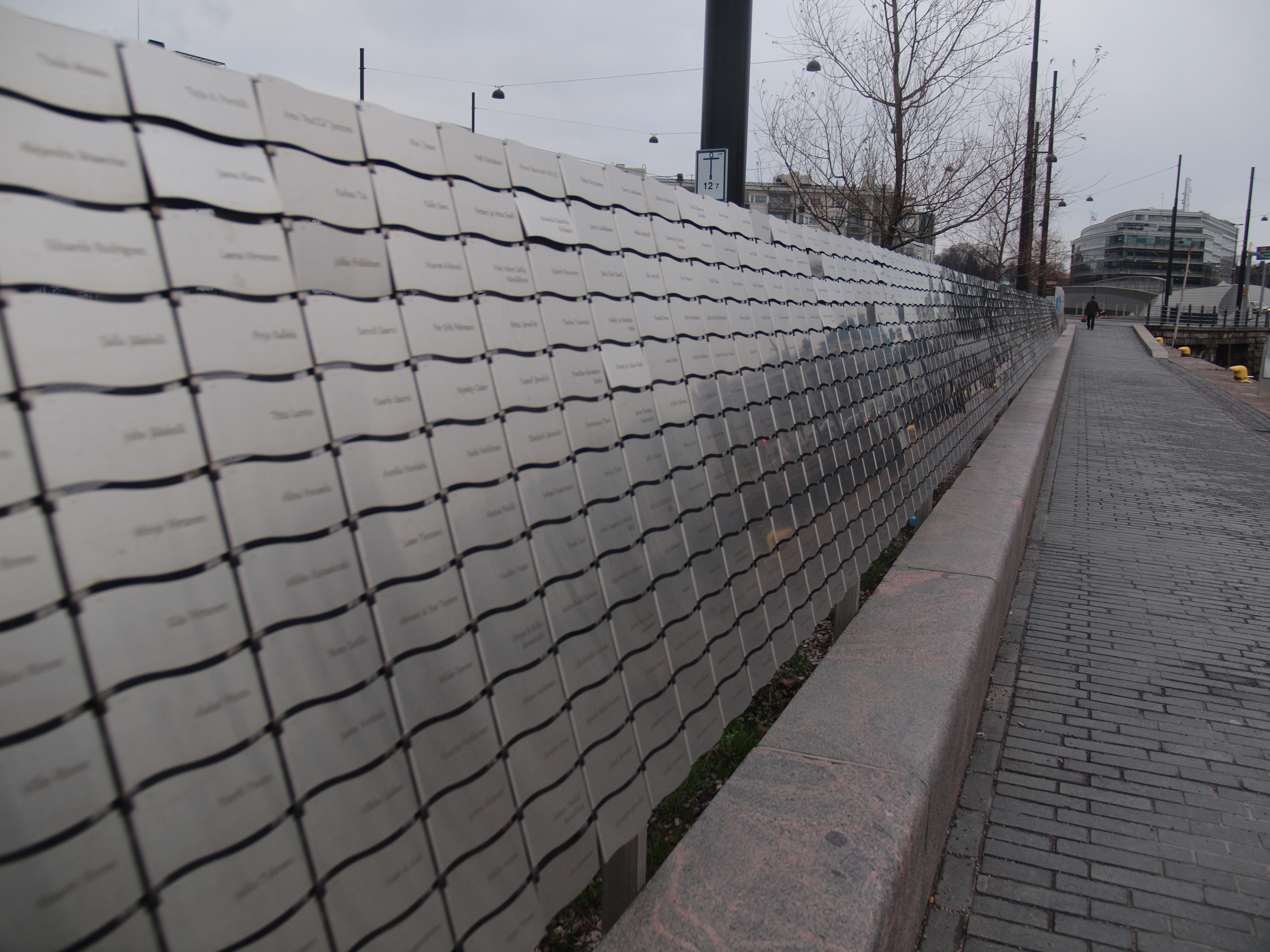
Horisontti is a sculpture on the eastern shore of Jätkäsaari, consisting of hundreds of tiny plaques, each bearing the name of a donator to the "Keep the Baltic Sea clean" campaign

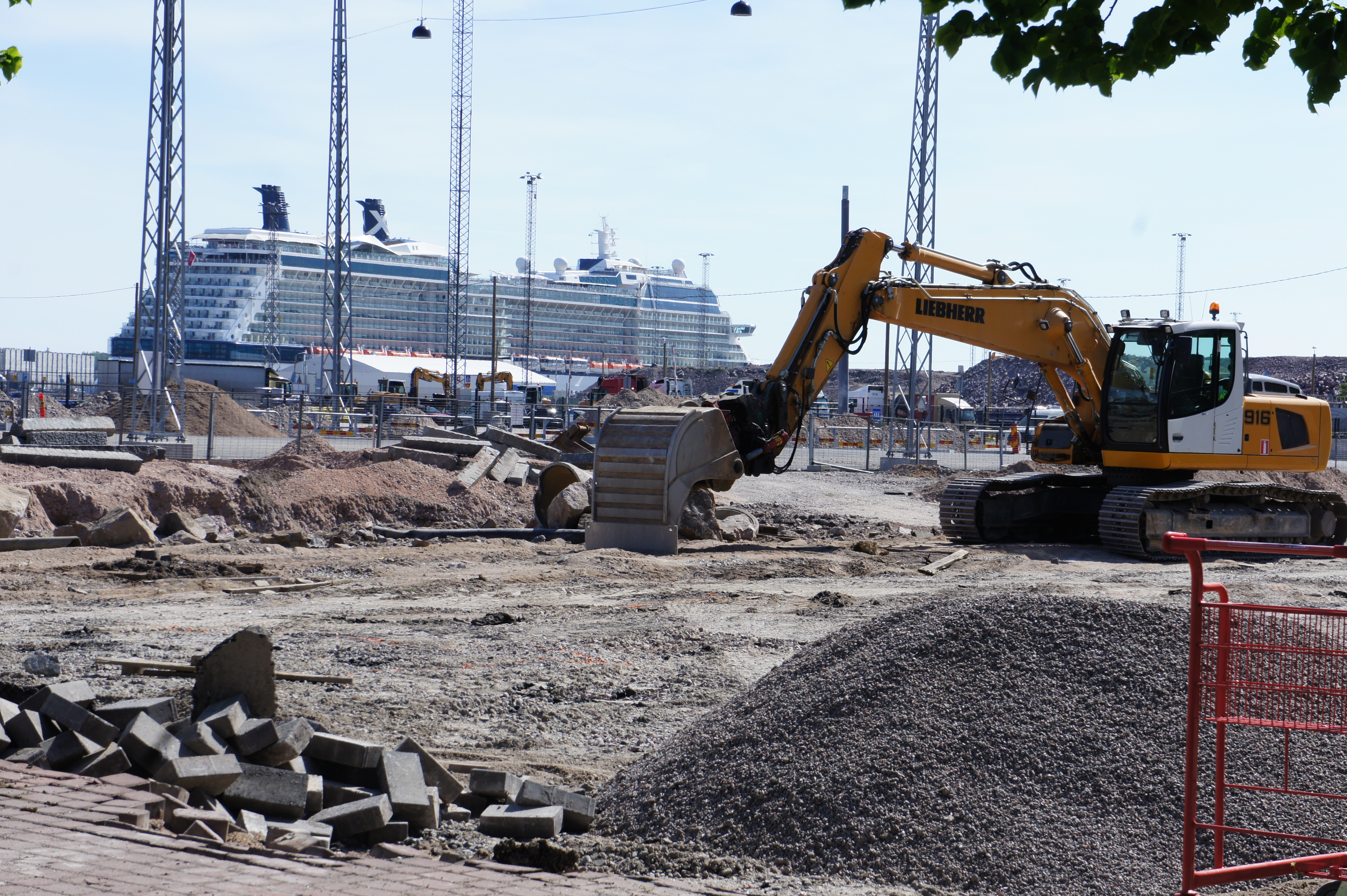
A construction site in Jätkäsaari. The 315 m long M/S Celebrity Eclipse is seen in the background

The new Jätkäsaari area is planned as an urban, densely built city district, built around the shoreline and an S-shaped park in the middle. The apartment blocks will be closed to protect the inner courtyards from wind; Jätkäsaari is known as one of the windiest districts in Helsinki. The planners envisage the completed area of having 17,000 residents as well as 6,000 jobs. The area will have several schools, kindergartens, sports facilities and public services. Public transport in Jätkäsaari is handled primarily by the Helsinki tram network. Waste collection is operated by automated vacuum collection. The street names of Jätkäsaari are based on the Finnish nomenclature of the regions of the Pacific Ocean, Atlantic Ocean and Caribbean Sea, such as Samoankuja ("Samoa Alley"), Bahamankatu ("Bahama Street"), Kuubankatu ("Cuba Street") or Hyväntoivonkatu ("Good Hope Street").

== History ==
=== Etymology ===
The name of the area has appeared in old documents as Busholmen (1696), Busholm (1750) and Buus Holmen (1777).

The Finnish name Jätkäsaari has been translated from Swedish. At the time, it was thought that the word bus in the Swedish name meant a dock worker (hamnbuse). Later it has been connected to the ancient Swedish word buza meaning a merchant ship. The latter meaning has also been connected with the island of Hästö-Busö in Ekenäs. There are also other suggestions: in local Swedish dialects bus means a bogeyman. Jätkäsaari was marked as "Mörkösaari" ("Bogeyman island") in some maps in 1912. Other explanations have sought the etymology from the words buts (hill) or bu/bo (cattle). It is however most likely that the word bus refers to some old harbour place. The Finnish name of the island was confirmed as Busholma in 1909 and later Jätkäsaari in 1928.

=== Inhabitation ===
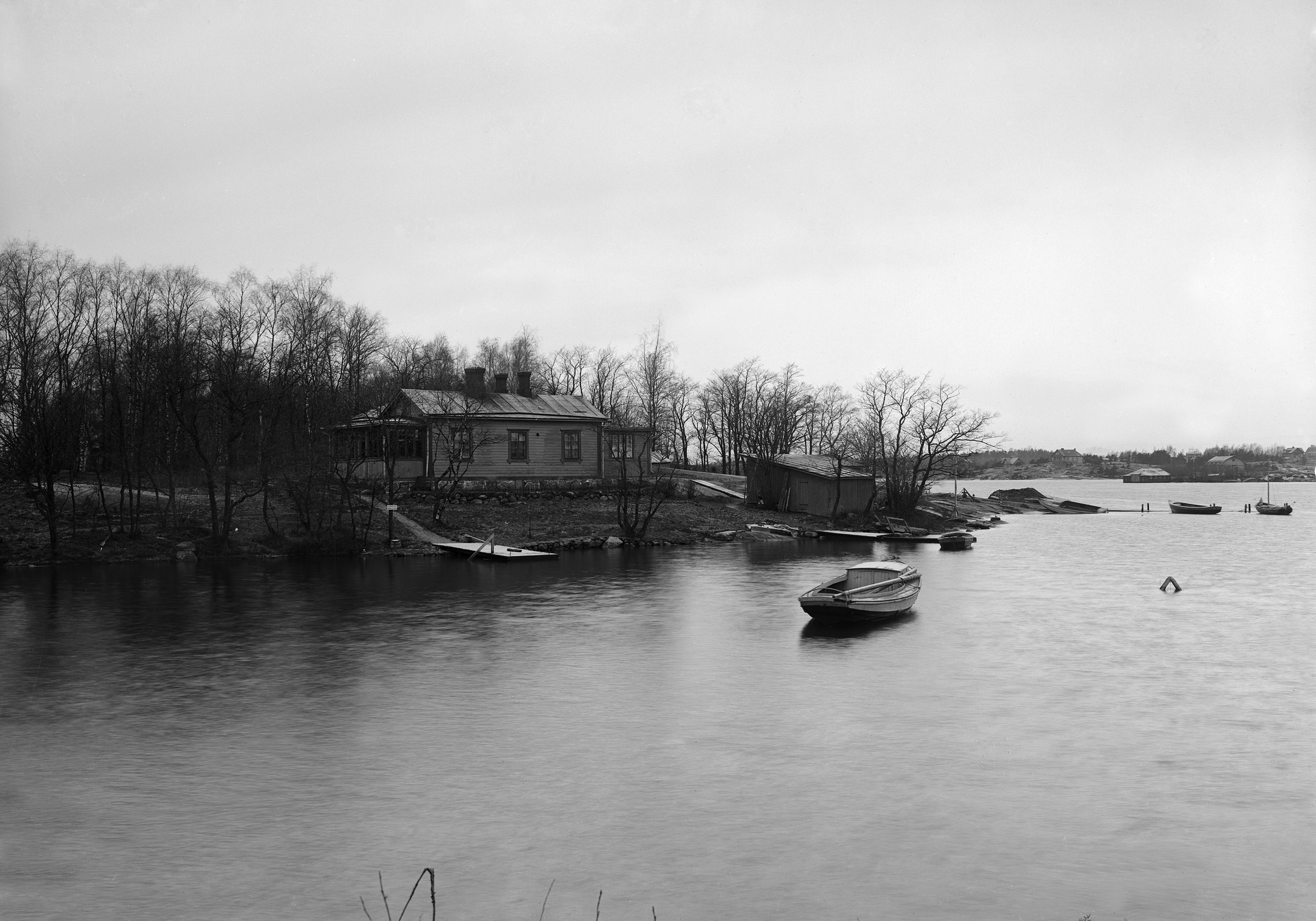
Inhabitation in Jätkäsaari in 1913.

The history of inhabitation on the island starts from the late 19th century. In 1865 there were only about twenty permanent inhabitants in Jätkäsaari in their little cabins. The permanent inhabitants of Jätkäsaari were professional fishermen, and it also served as an area of vacation villas for the gentry and as a recreational area for citizens of Helsinki. In summer it was a place for swimming and in winter a place for down-hill skiing.

=== As a cargo harbour ===
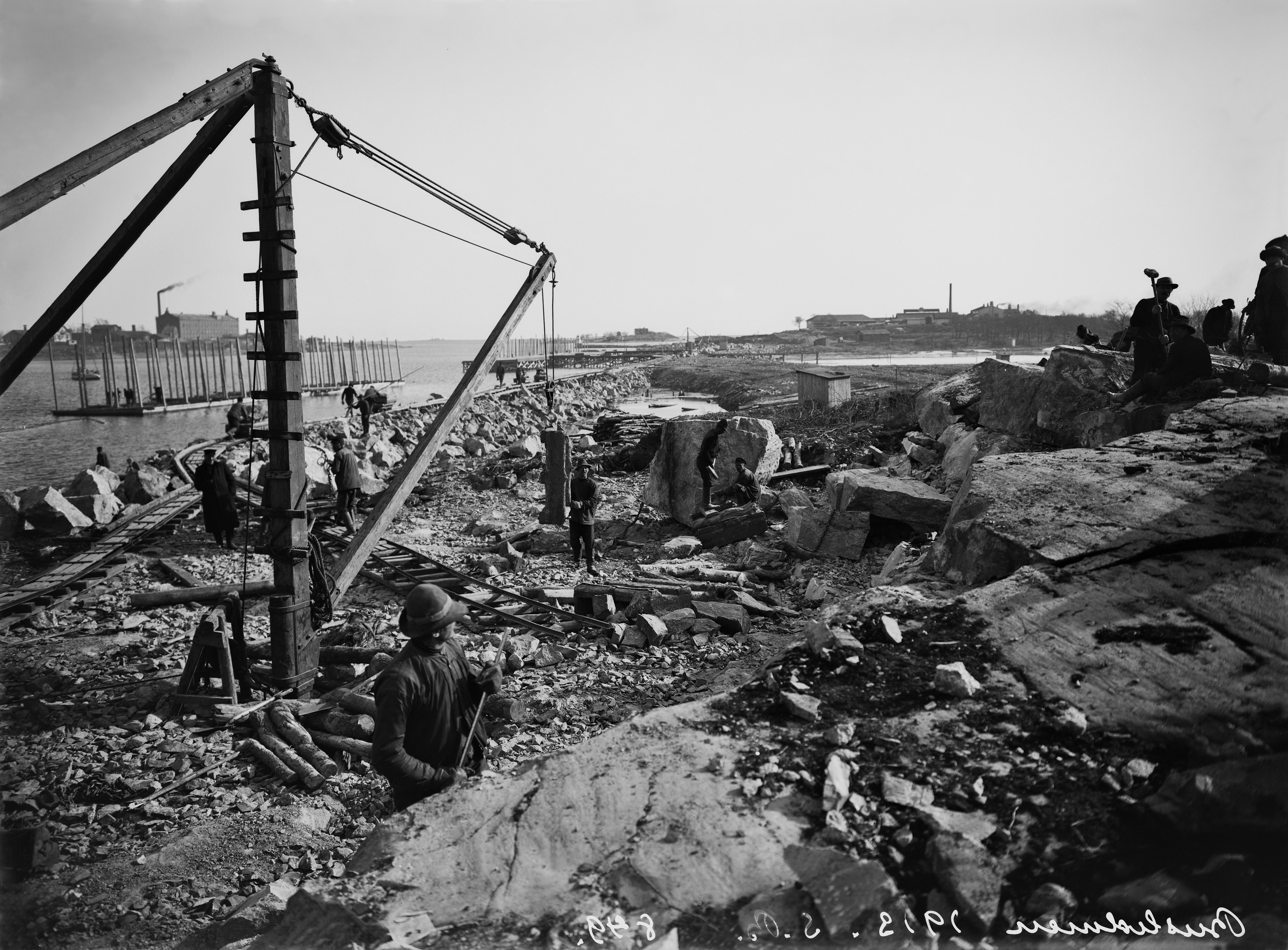
Construction of the harbour in 1913.

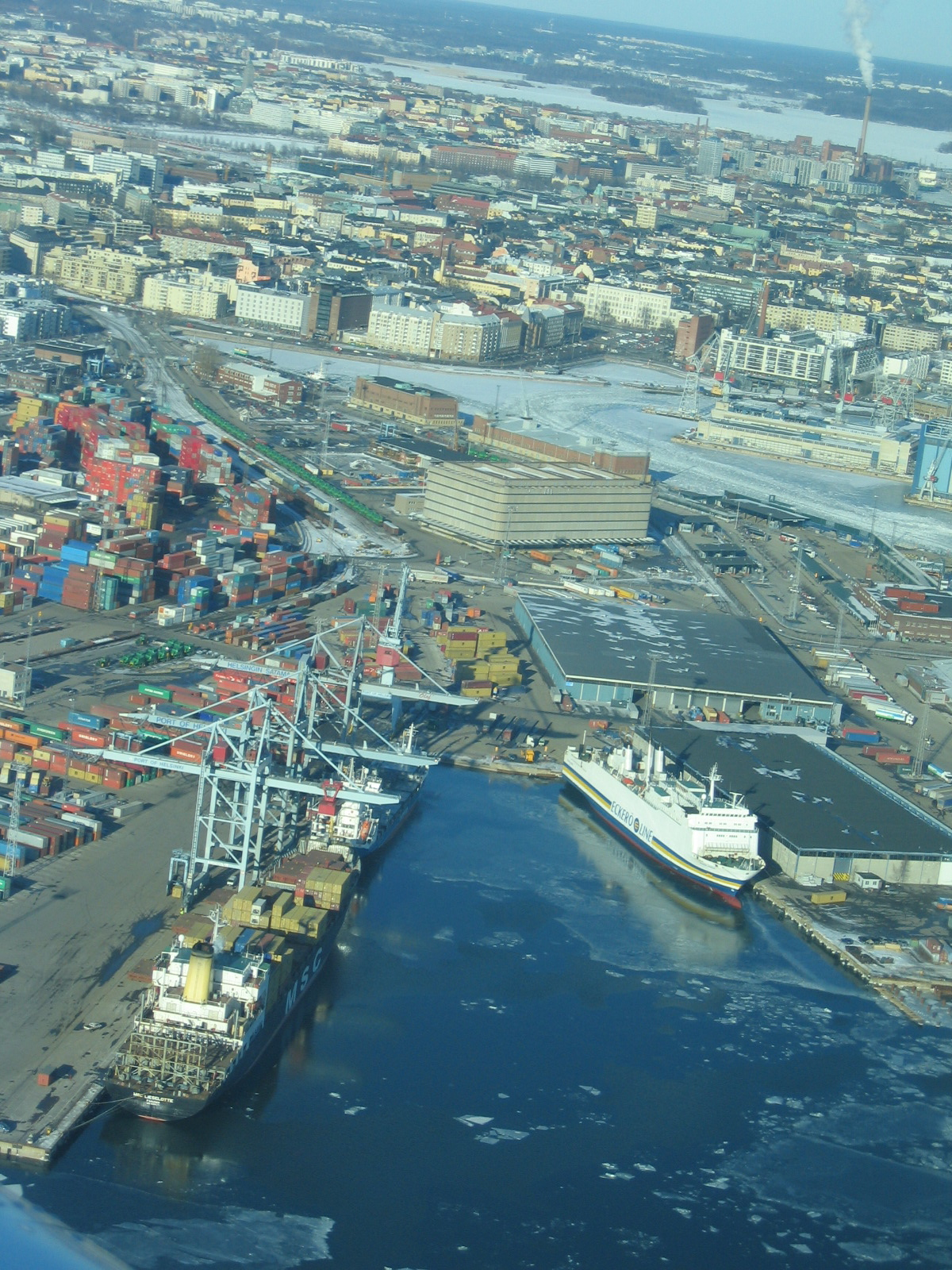
An aerial photograph of the Jätkäsaari harbour area in 2005.

The West Harbour was decided to be built in Jätkäsaari in 1911, but still in 1916 the city built a swimming facility on the island, which had to be dismantled already after three years. The construction of the harbour started in 1913, and the island was connected to the mainland by a wide bridge with railway tracks running in the middle. The new branch of the Helsinki harbour rail running from the Helsinki Central Station to Katajanokka, branching off to Jätkäsaari, was built in 1916. A long pier was built in the harbour. The neighbouring islands of Hietasaari and Saukko were merged to the Jätkäsaari harbour area by leveling them and filling the sea in between them with reclaimed land. The name Jätkäsaari for the new continuous area was established in 1928. In the 1930s, the area was used as dumping site.

In terms of traffic, the harbour was the largest in Helsinki since the 1960s, and its expansion continued in the 1970s. The area was still being expanded with reclaimed land, and when a part of the bay to the north of Jätkäsaari was filled in, Jätkäsaari changed from an island to a large peninsula. During the next decades, the traffic in the West Harbour grew to the full extent of its capacity. Train and truck traffic to and from the harbour started to become overwhelming in terms of the traffic connections in the city centre. The nearly century-old harbour finally moved to the Vuosaari Harbour with a larger capacity in November 2008, and only passenger traffic to Estonia (mostly to Tallinn) remained at the West Terminal. Construction of a new residential area started in the place of the previous huge container port. The last of the railway tracks were dismantled in spring 2009.

=== As a residential area ===
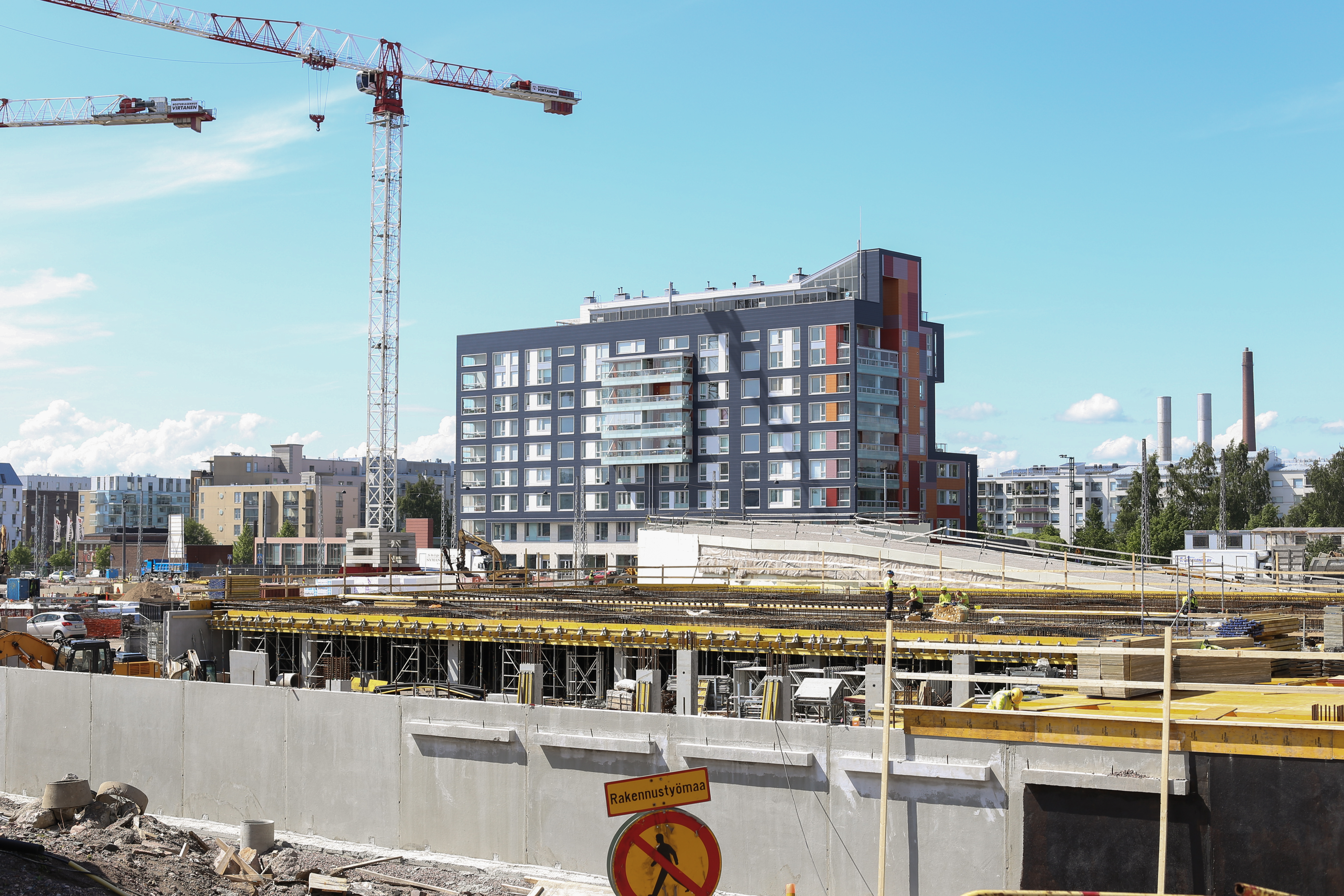
Residential construction in 2015.

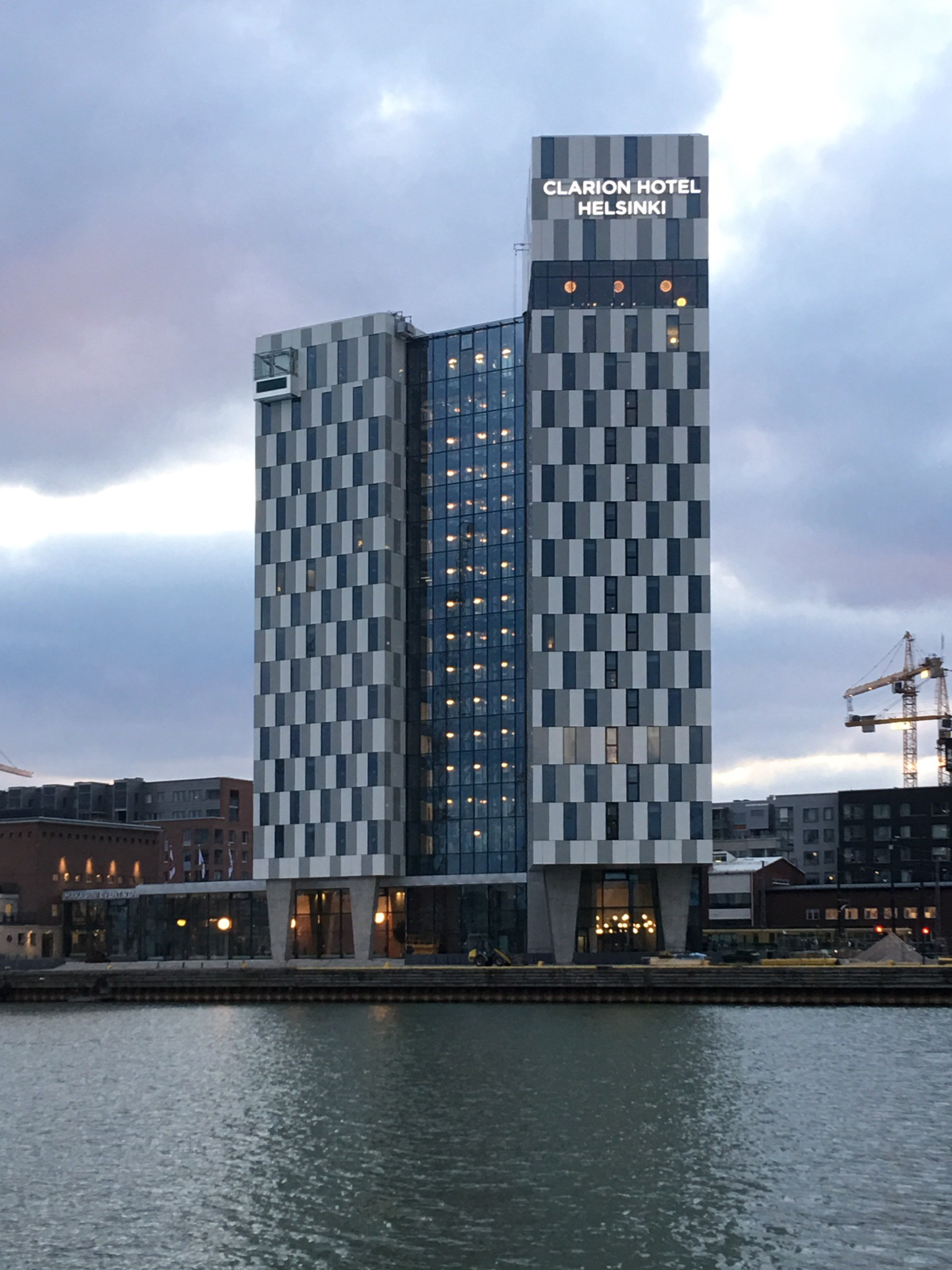
Clarion Hotel Helsinki was opened in October 2016.

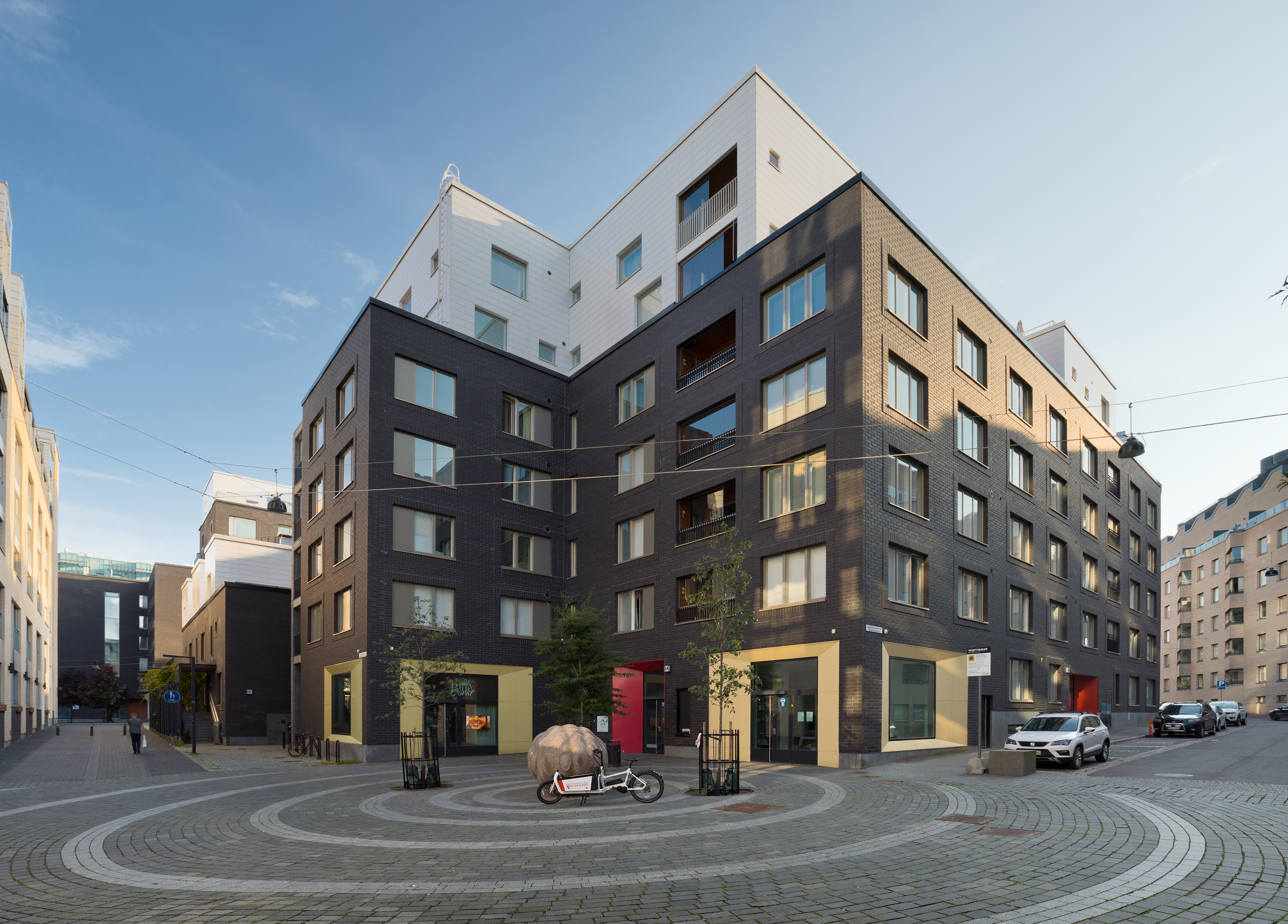
A residential building on Juutinraumankatu.

The entire Jätkäsaari area has an area of over 100 hectares. The part of the island north of Laivapojankuja was converted into a residential area already in the 1990s as part of the construction project of Ruoholahti, and at the same time the Ruoholahti canal was dug, making the area into an island once again. The most part of Jätkäsaari still remained in use for the harbour.

In 2006, a layer of sediment about half a metre thick was found in the seafloor in front of Jätkäsaari containing large concentrations of tributyltin, hazardous to the marine life. It was determined to have accumulated from a special coating used on ships. The contaminated layer was removed by way of dredging.

After the container port moved to Vuosaari in November 2008, Jätkäsaari begun to be rebuilt into a new district with 18 thousand inhabitants and 6 thousand jobs as part of the Länsisatama construction project in 2010. The first buildings were constructed once the soil had been cleaned and streets had been built. An automated vacuum collection system Rööri started operation in early 2014.

The old Huutokonttori building, originally built as an employment office for sailors, has been converted into a fire station and also serves as the Jätkäsaari information centre and library. The flagship store of the Verkkokauppa.com chain and the Finland head office of Tallink Silja are also located next to the West Harbour. The 16-floor Clarion Hotel Helsinki was opened in October 2016.

Plans exist to build about 300 new apartments, a swimming hall and sport facilities in Bunkkeri, an old warehouse of the cargo ship harbour. In 2023, the city moved to withdraw from the contract, citing not being able to find an investor for the project. In 2019 there were plans to build a new parking garage, a new sports centre and a 24-floor Royal Center hotel in Jätkäsaari, construction of which started in early 2020. A primarily Swedish-speaking block named Kvarteret Victoria was also built in the area.

=== As a concert venue ===
American pop singer-songwriter Madonna performed at the site of the former container harbour in Jätkäsaari on 6 August 2009 as part of her Sticky & Sweet Tour. Over 85,000 tickets were sold, making it the largest for-pay concert ever held in the Nordic countries. Surrounding air and maritime space were closed for the event, a move usually reserved for matters of national security at the time.

== Transport ==
=== Public transport ===
By design, Jätkäsaari has 3 operating tram lines (trams 7, 8, 9) but no bus lines. The large number of arriving and departing ship passengers at the passenger harbour means that occasionally trams are fully packed. However, a metro stop and several bus lines can be found in neighbouring Ruoholahti district which is less than a 15-minute walk from the harbour.

The tram line 8 originally had its terminus in Salmisaari but it was expanded via the Crusell Bridge to Saukonpaasi in Jätkäsaari in early 2012 and the tram line 9 from the city centre was expanded to the West Terminal in August 2012. After the tram tracks on Välimerenkatu were completed in August 2017 the terminus of tram line 9 moved to Saukonpaasi, but after the new Atlantinsilta bridge was completed in May 2021 the tram line was extended via Atlantinkatu to the West Terminal.

There is a taxi station at the West Terminal. Taxis from the Ruoholahti metro station and the Seaside hotel also come to the area.

=== Tunnel project ===
In February 2021, the Helsinki City Council approved the construction of a tunnel from Jätkäsaari to the Länsiväylä motorway. The projected cost of the tunnel is 180 million euro. As of 2023, construction is planned to begin in 2025, with the tunnel opening for traffic in 2028.

== Post office and post codes ==
There is a post office open 24/7 in Jätkäsaari in the premises of the Verkkokauppa.com store. It serves the post code areas of 00180 and 00220 Helsinki. The street Välimerenkatu acts as a divisor between them, so that the odd numbers on its northwestern side have the post code 00180 and the even numbers on its southeastern side have the post code 00220.

== Gallery ==
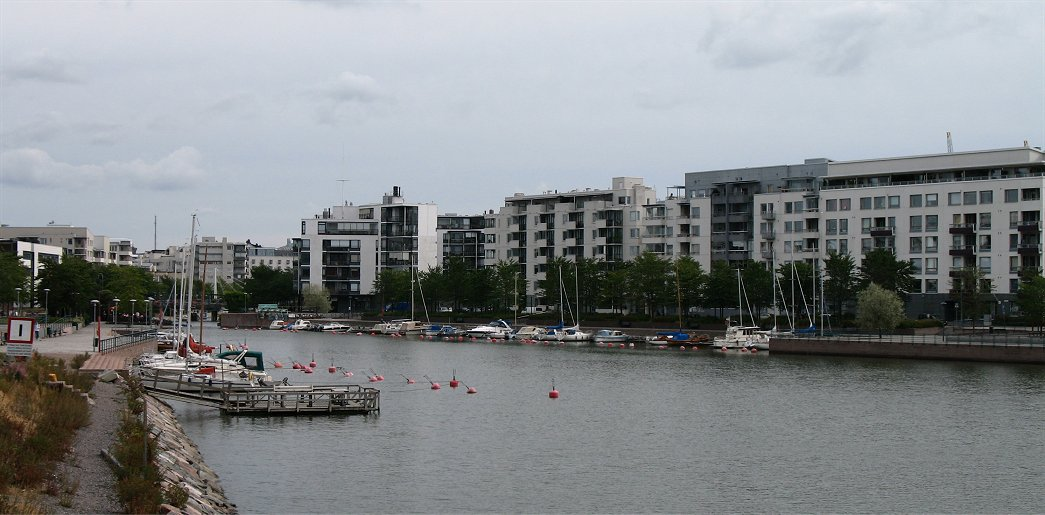
Apartment buildings on the northern shore of Jätkäsaari along the Ruoholahti canal.

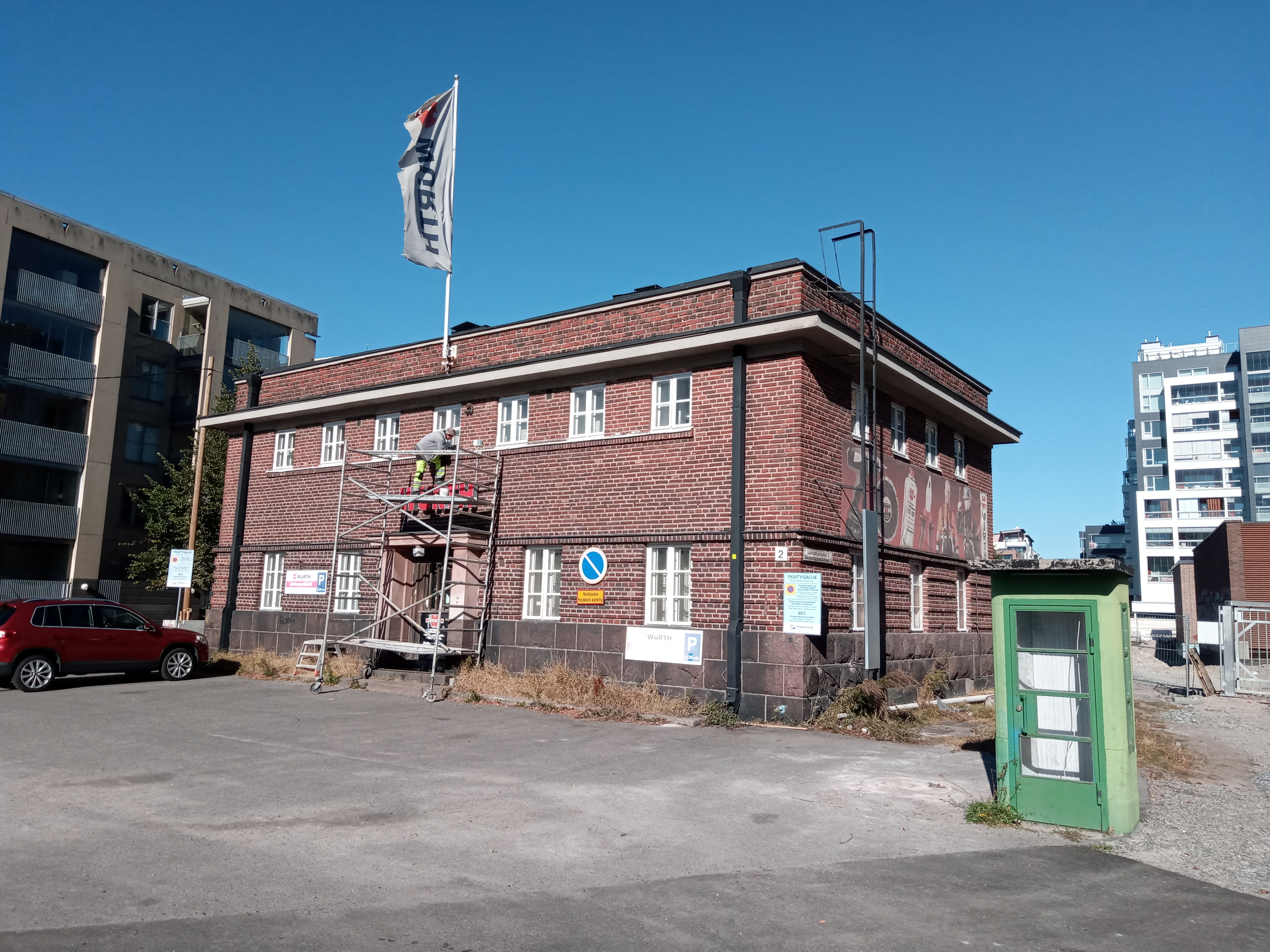
The harbour management office designed by Lars Sonck in 1929 on Laivapojanaukio is one of the four protected buildings in Jätkäsaari.

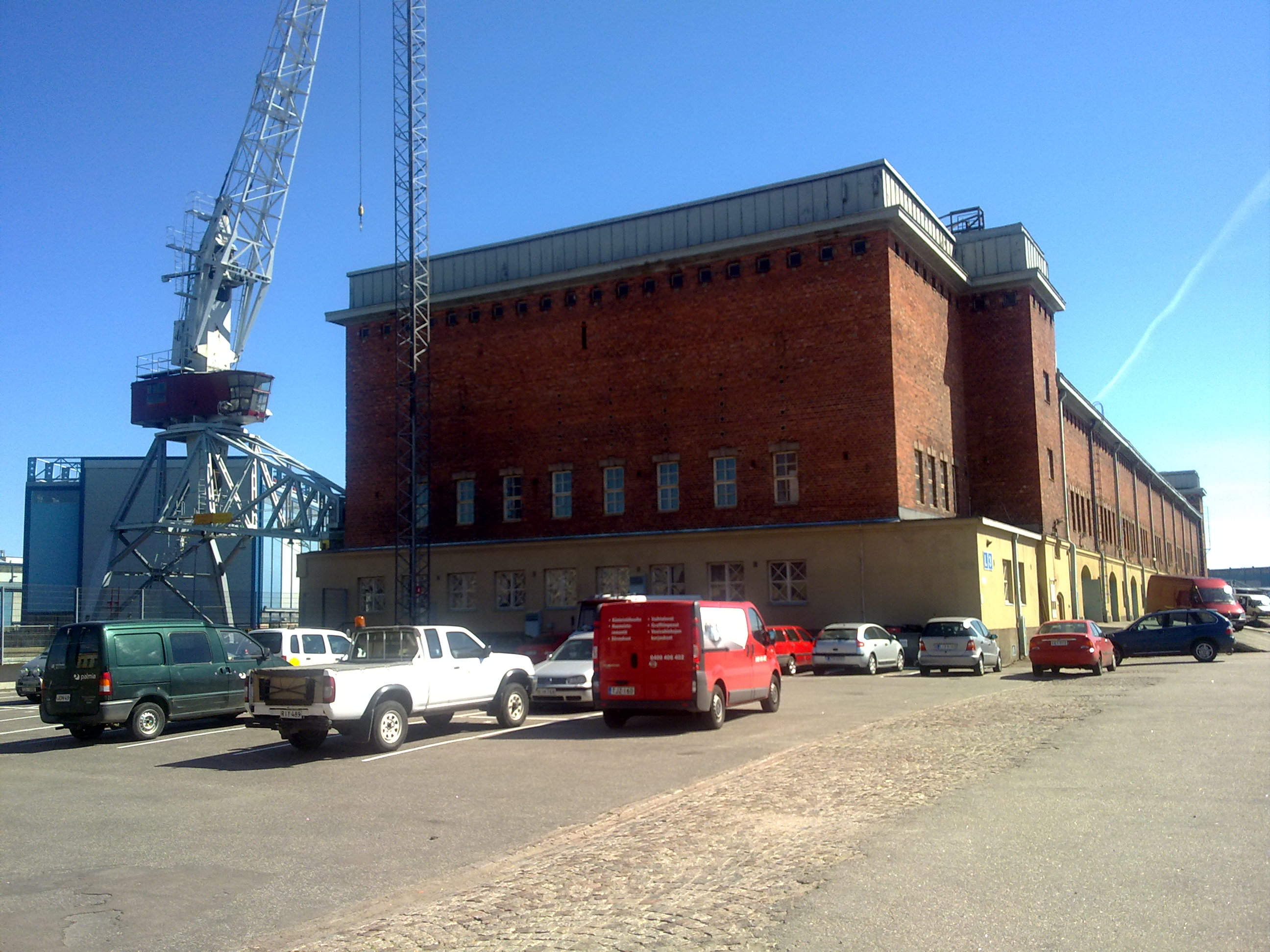
The coastal warehouse L3 on Tyynenmerenkatu.

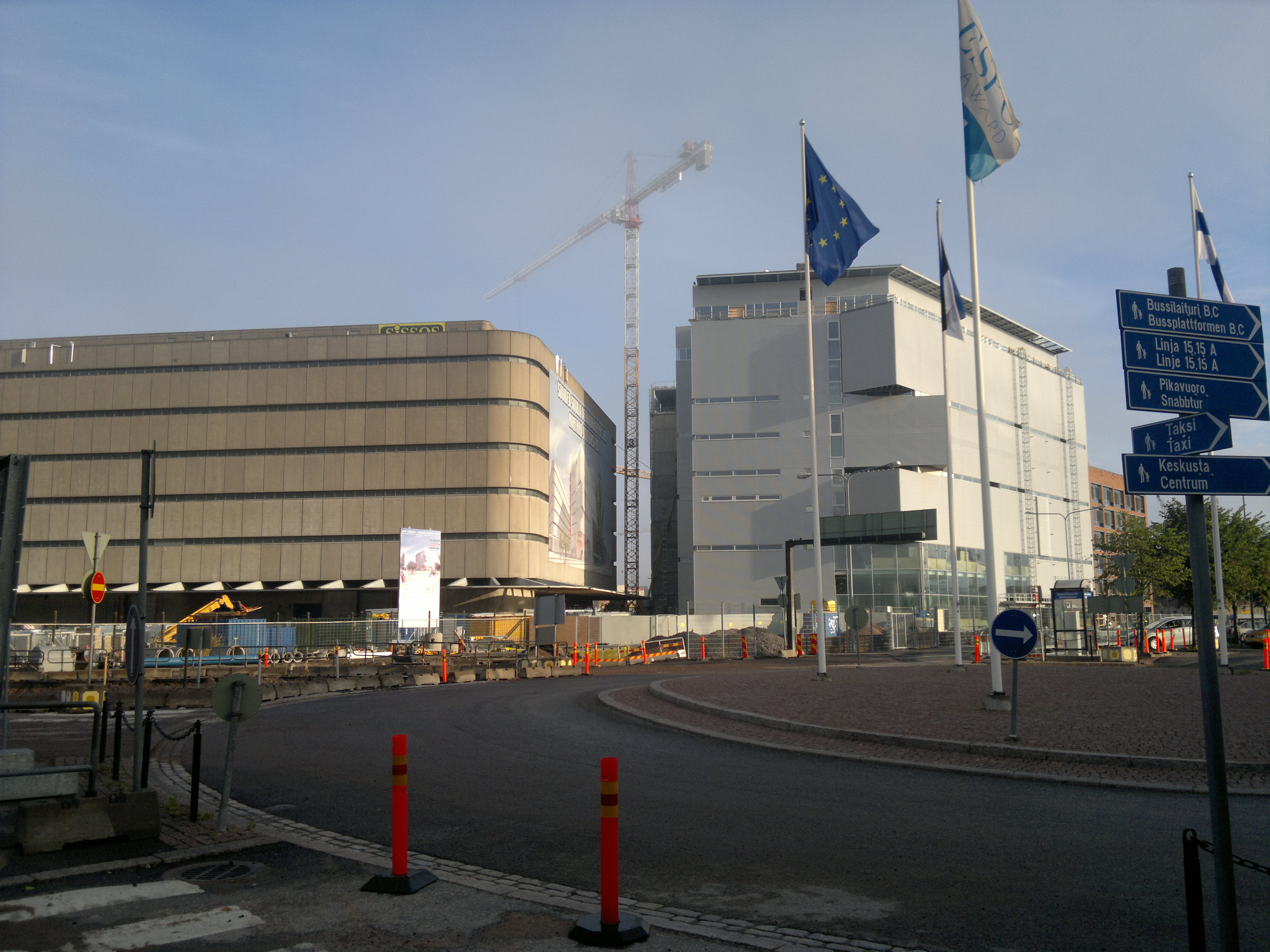
Verkkokauppa.com and Bunkkeri.

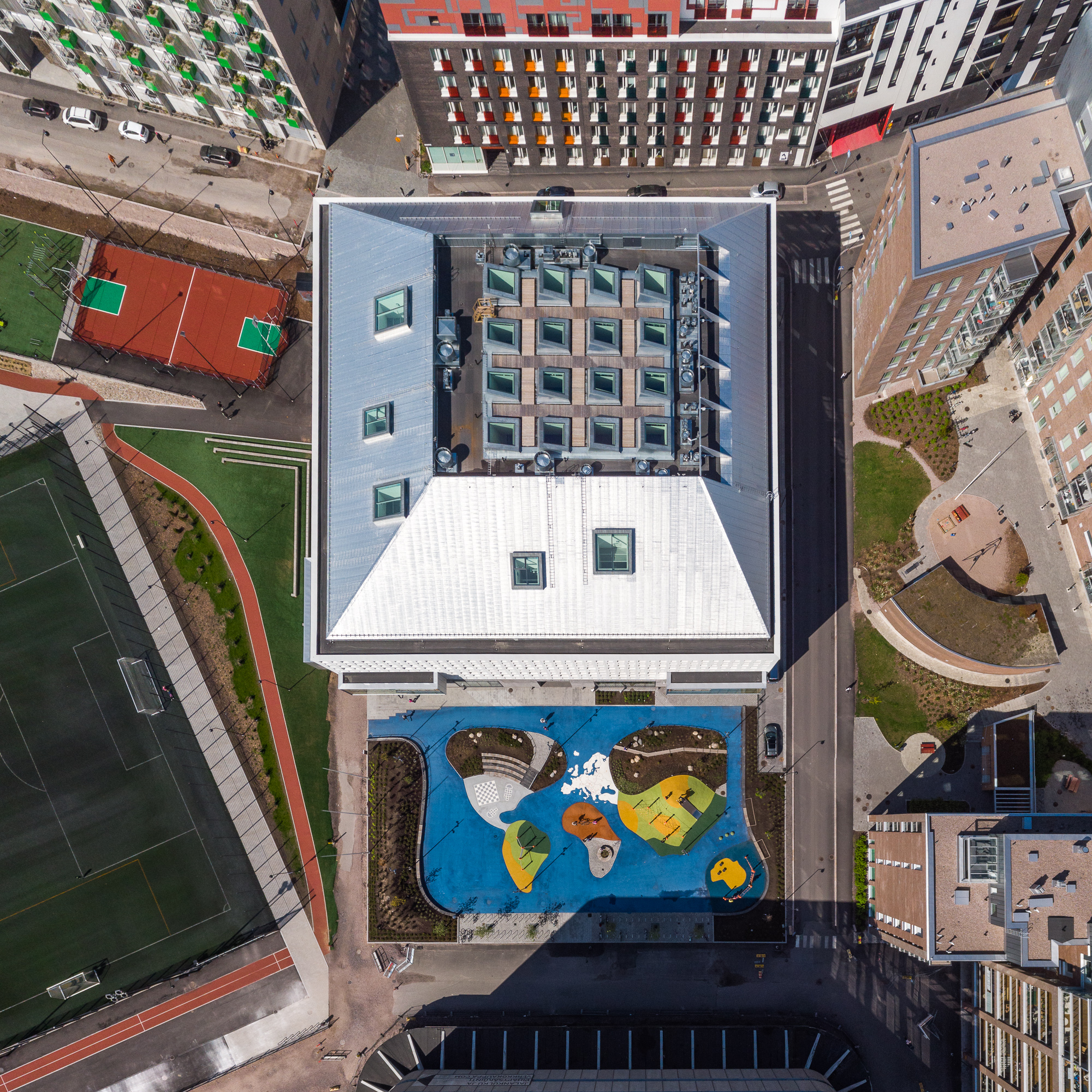
Jätkäsaari comprehensive school.

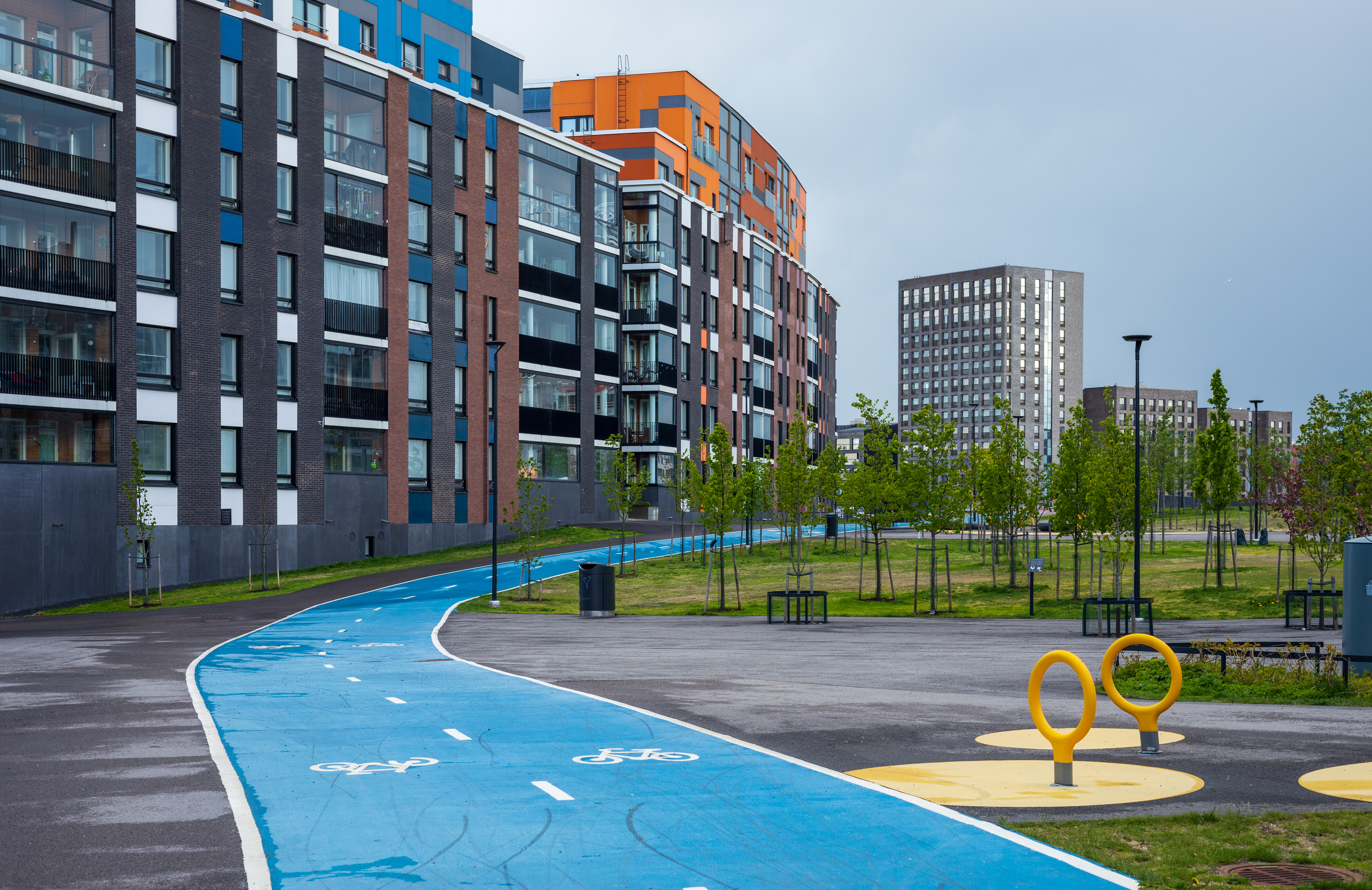
Hyväntoivonpuisto park.

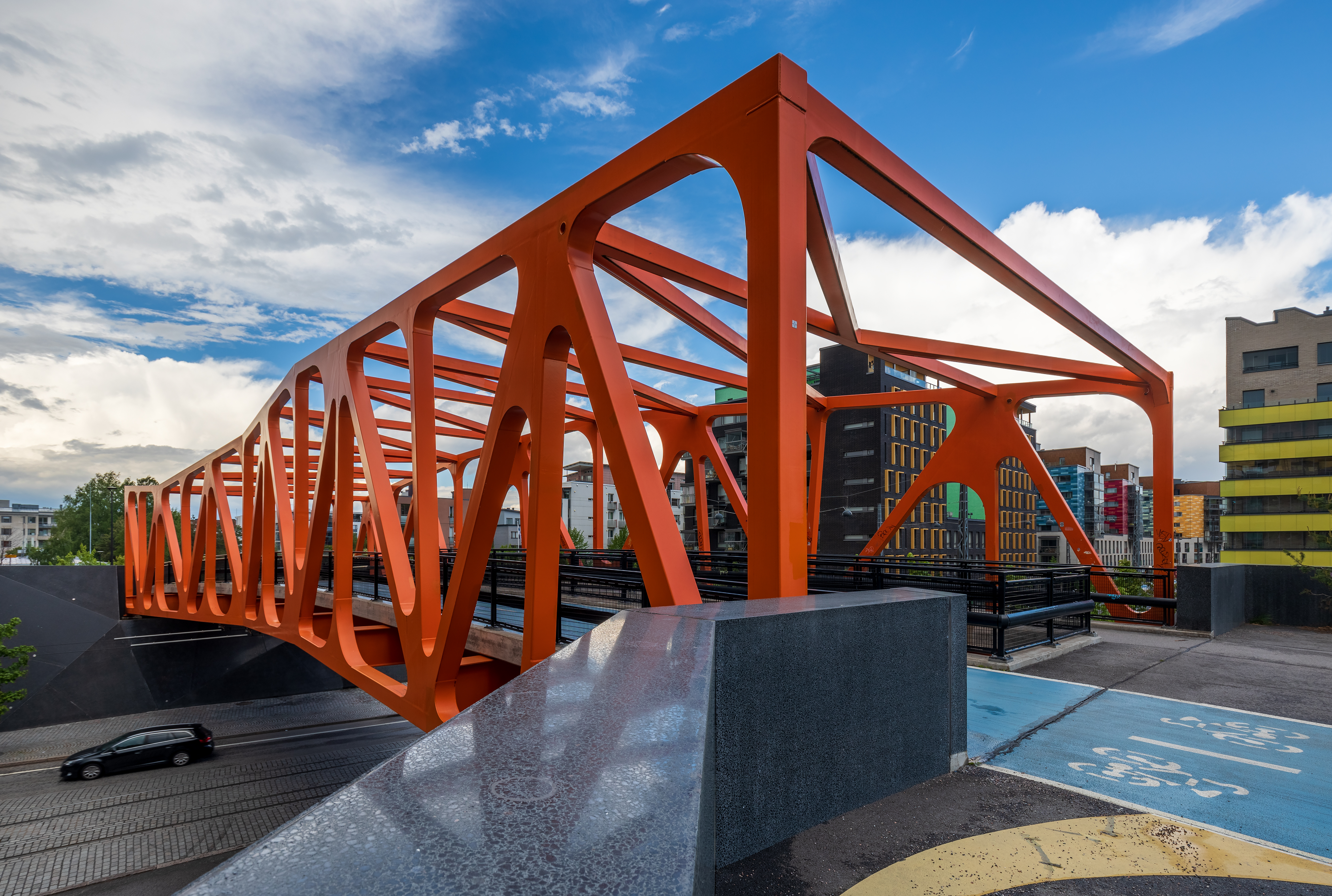
The "Rokkiporkkana" ("Rock'n'roll carrot") pedestrian bridge crosses over Välimerenkatu.

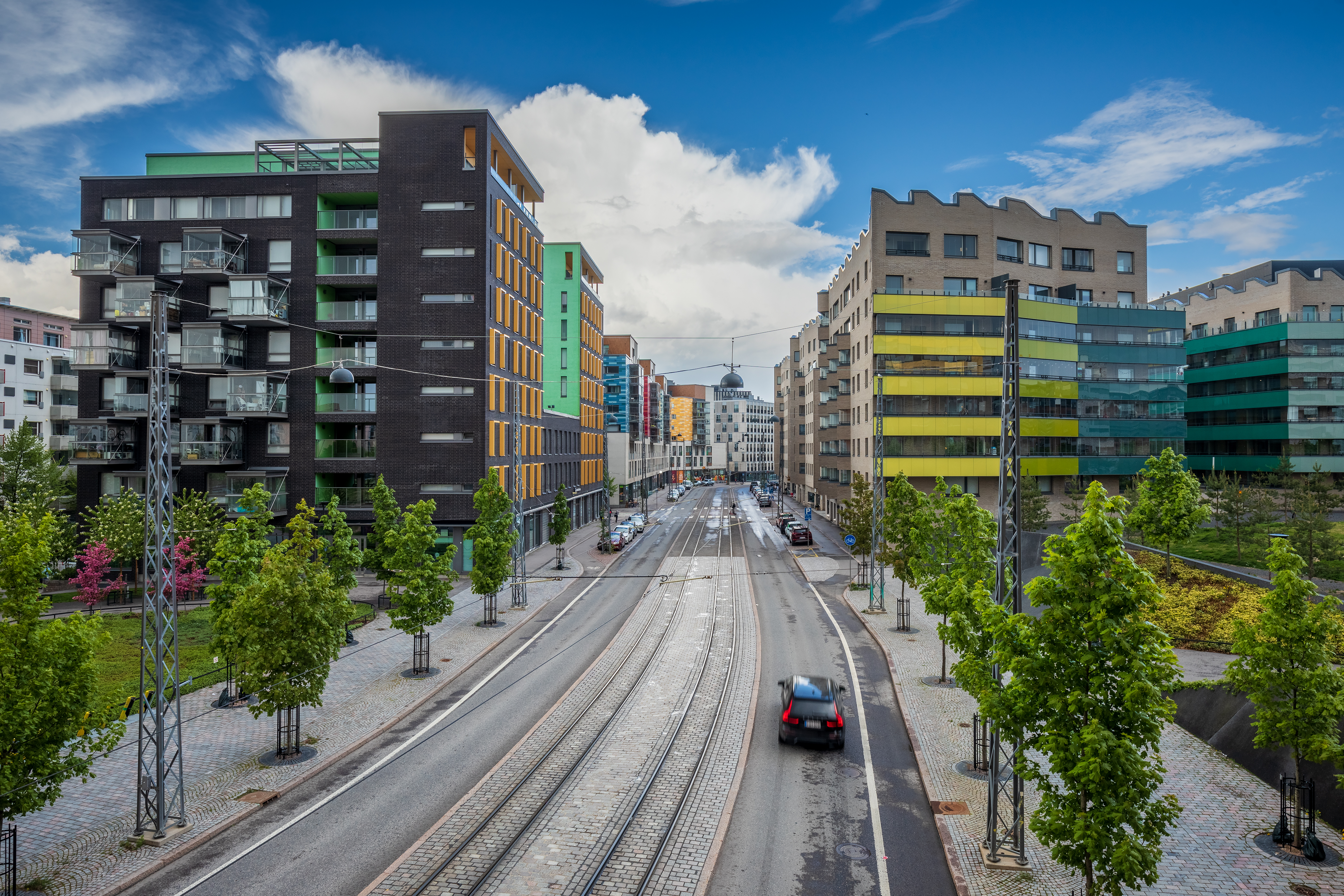
A view along Välimerenkatu.

== See also ==
- Subdivisions of Helsinki
  - Hernesaari
- Crusell Bridge
