= West Harbour, Helsinki =

Harbour in Helsinki, Finland

Coordinates: 60°09′21″N 024°54′51″E

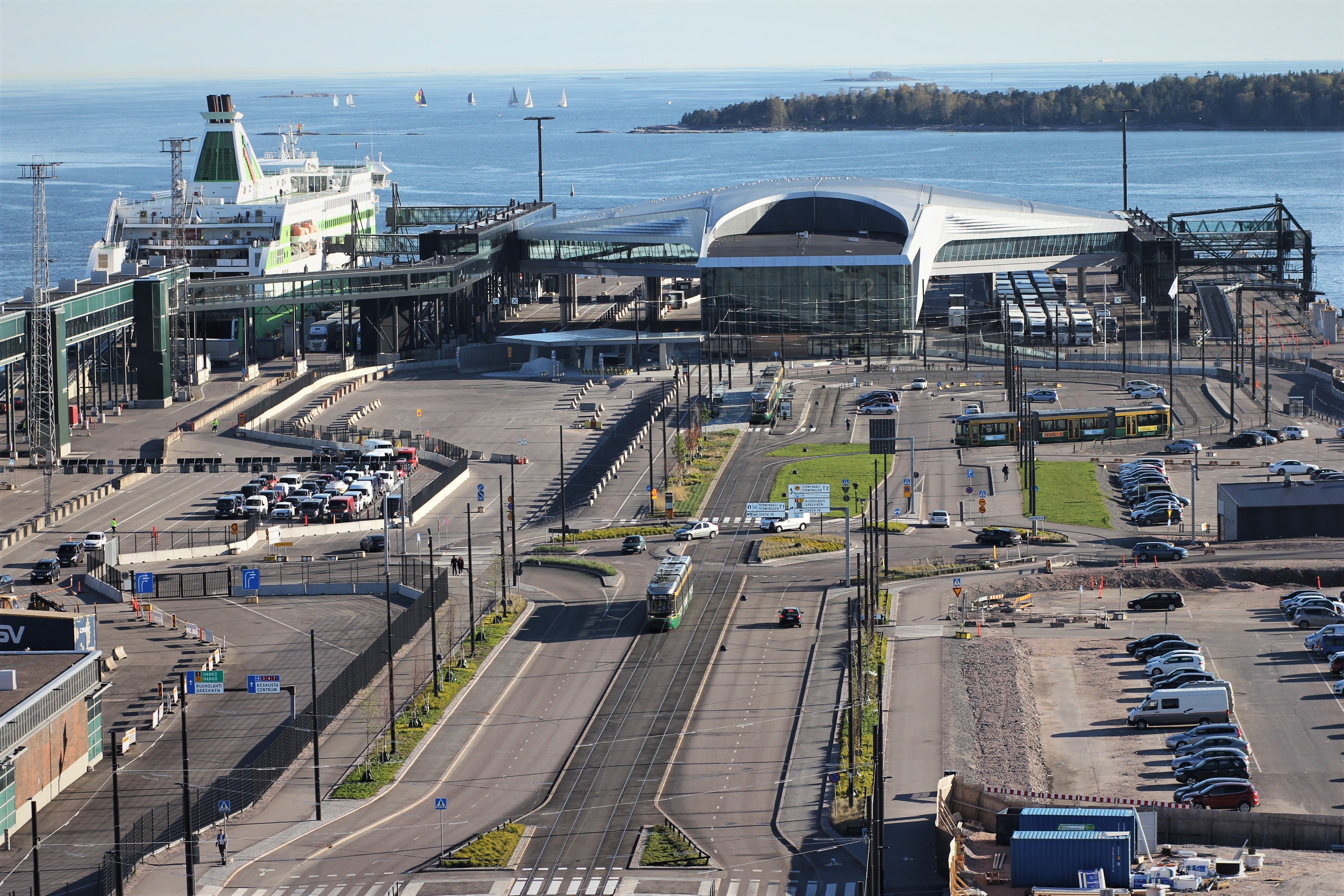
The West Terminal 2 building in 2019.

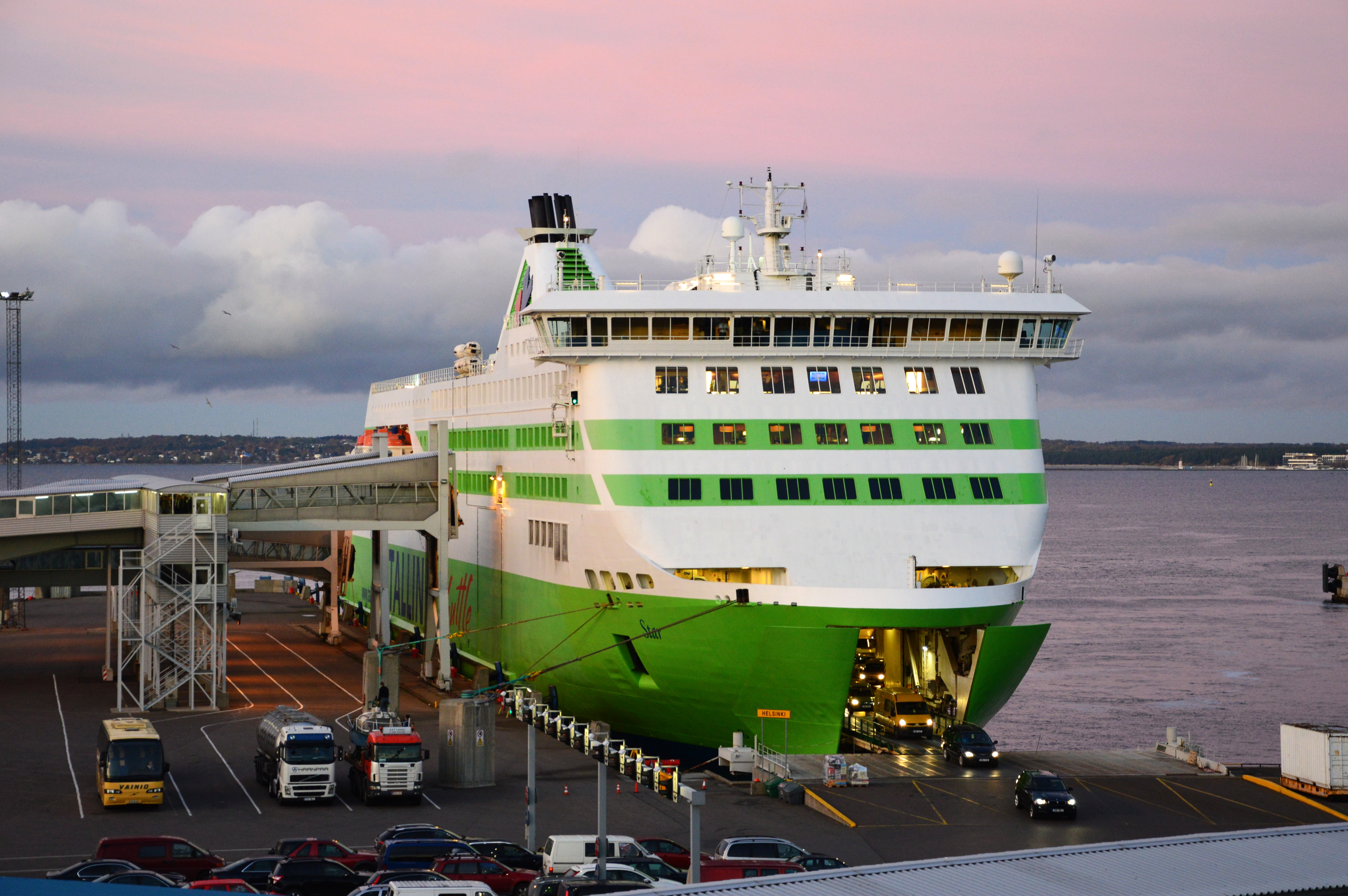
Cars being unloaded from Tallink's MS Star.

The West Harbour (Finnish: Länsisatama, Swedish: Västra hamnen) is a passenger and cargo harbour in the Jätkäsaari district of Helsinki, Finland, in the southwestern part of the Helsinki peninsula. The harbour area also includes a pier on the west side of Munkkisaari, used by cruiseliners. The harbour is operated by the Port of Helsinki.

The West Harbour is one of the two passenger harbours in the central part of the city of Helsinki: the South Harbour around the Market Square is also used for passenger traffic, primarily by services to Mariehamn and Stockholm.

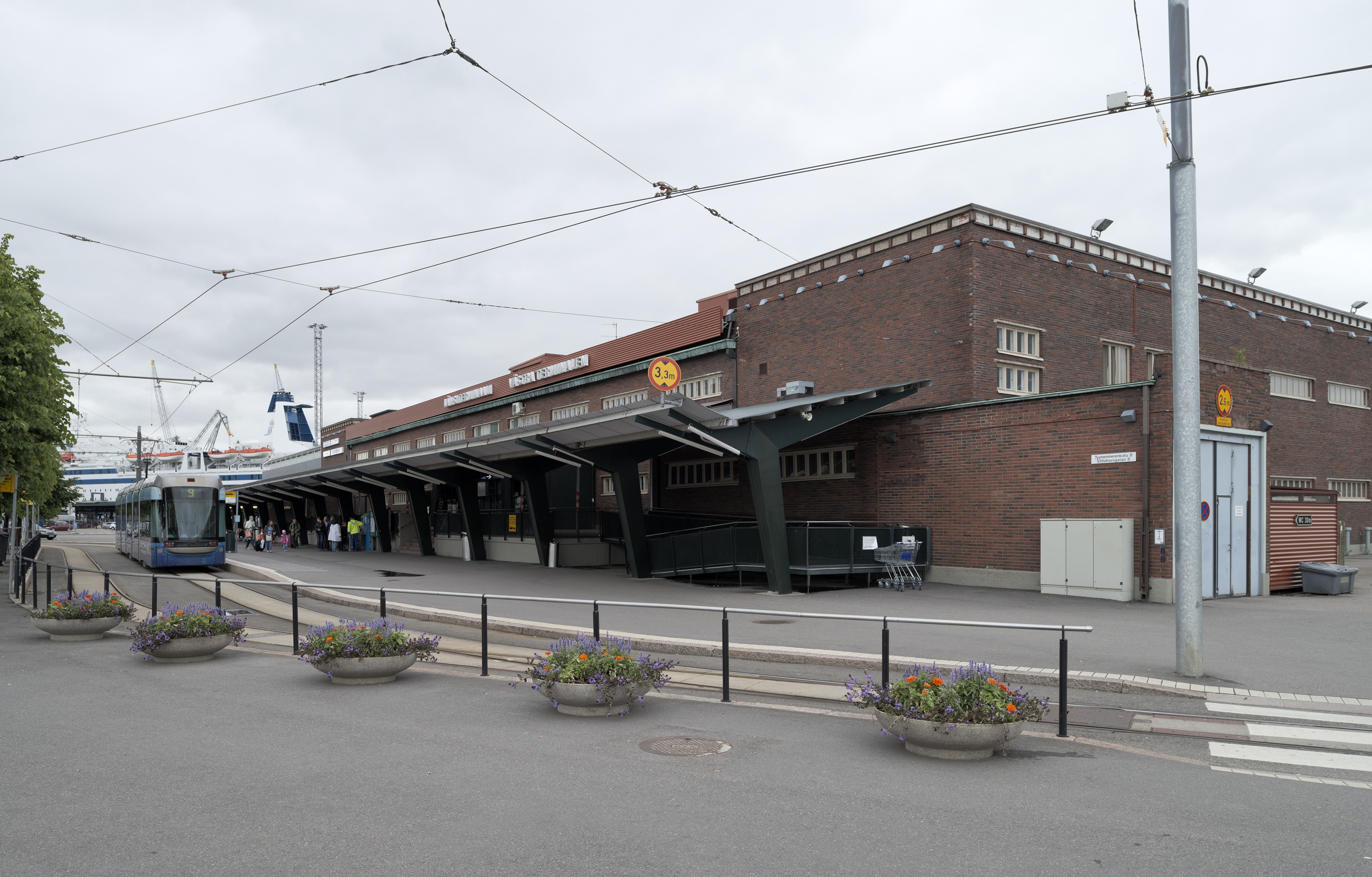
The former West Terminal 1 building in 2014.

The West Harbour has a single operational passenger terminal, West Terminal 2 (Finnish: Länsiterminaali 2, Swedish: Västra terminalen 2), which opened in 2017. West Terminal 2 is used by Tallink and Eckerö Line for fast ferry traffic to Tallinn. The former West Terminal 1 building, which was built in 1941 and mainly used by ships heading to Saint Petersburg, was demolished in 2025, with plans to redevelop the site into a new terminal building. After the new terminal is completed, the West Harbour will have five places for ships to dock.

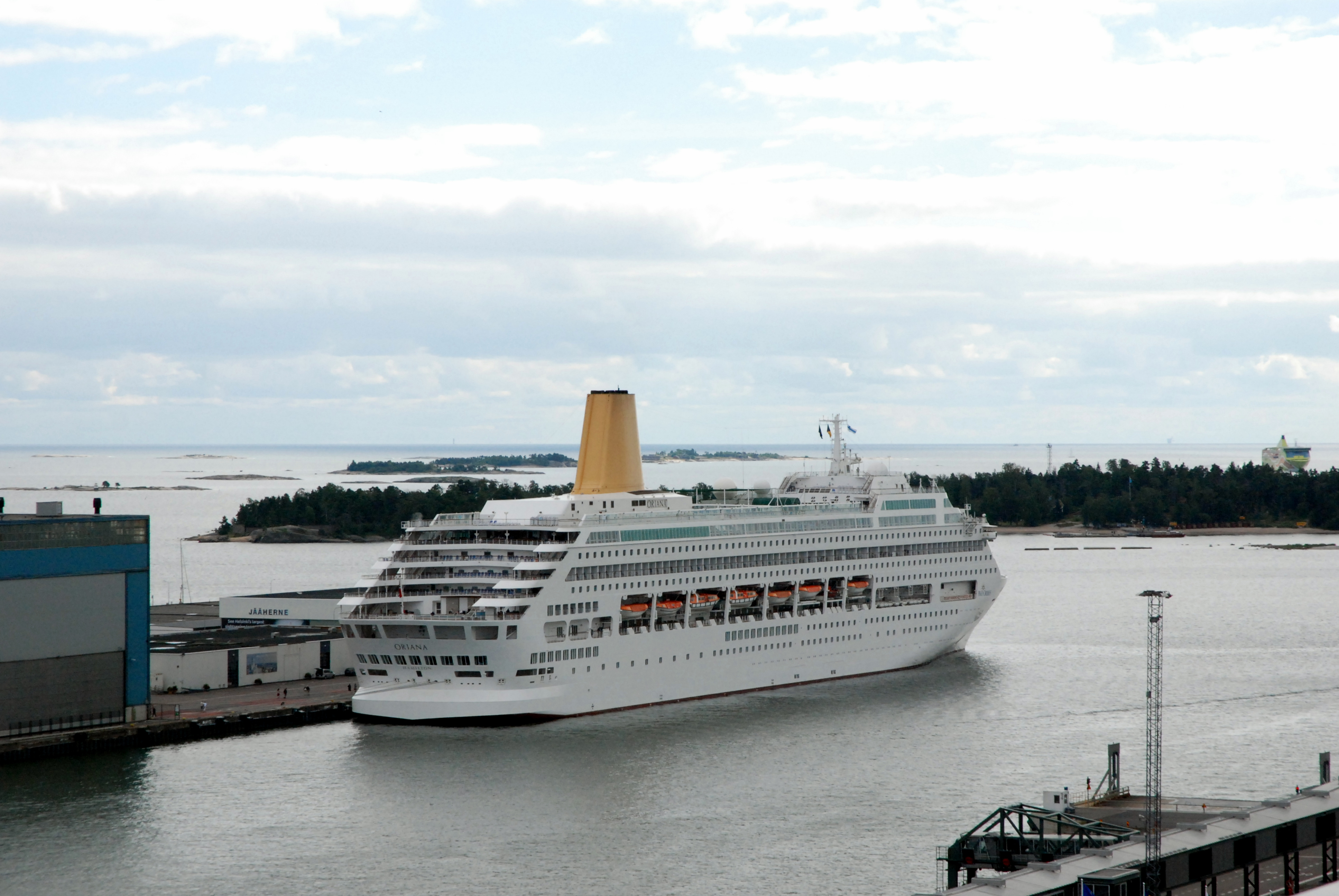
The ship Carnival Luminosa in Hernesaari in 2012.

The harbour area also includes the area of Hernesaari located east of Jätkäsaari, with three piers for international cruise ships on its western edge. The LHD pier serving ships as long as 360 metres was taken into use in Hernesaari in April 2019.

The passenger terminal is served by multiple Helsinki tram lines and the nearest metro station in Ruoholahti is a 1.3 km walk from the harbour.

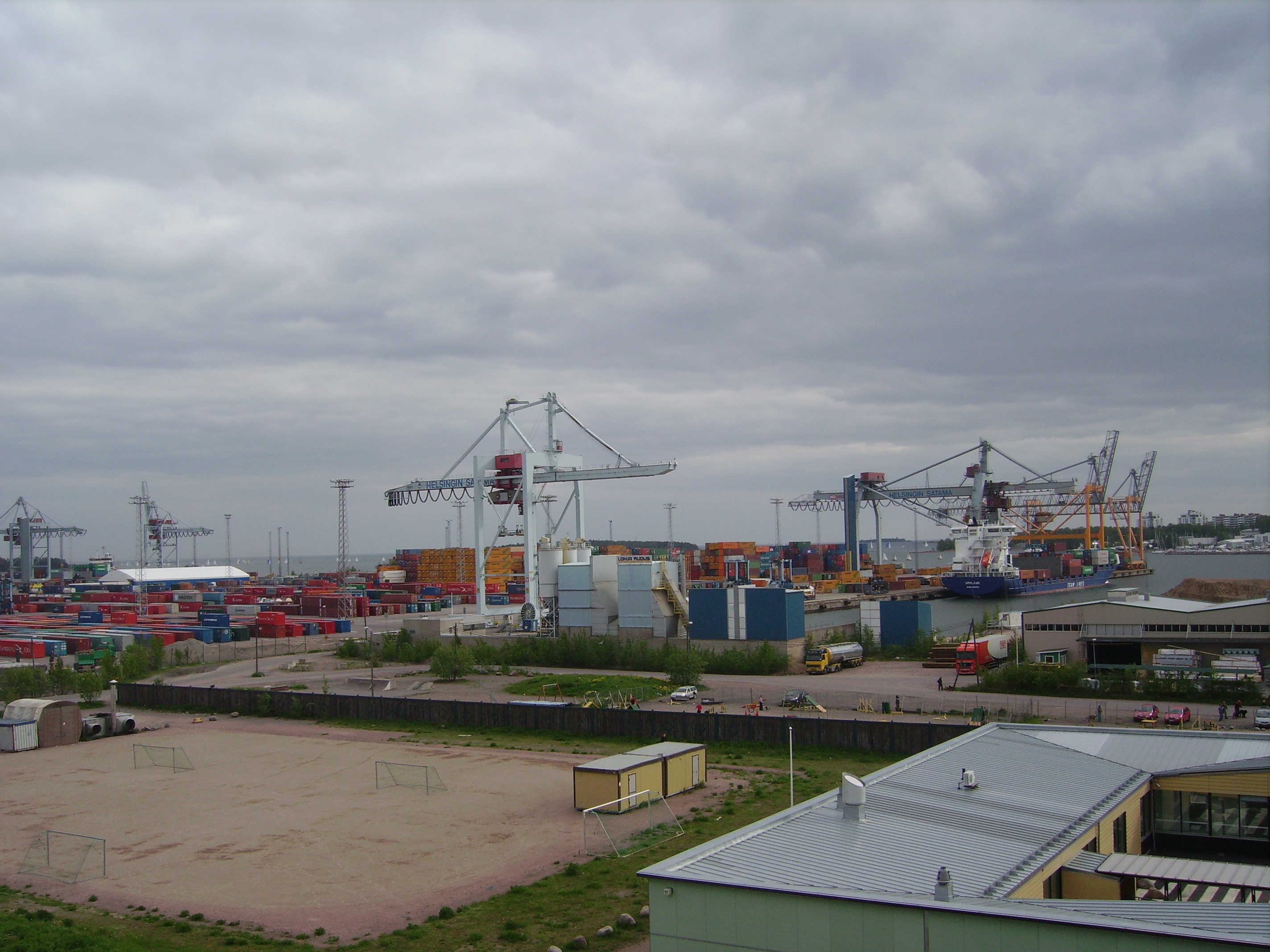
View of the West Harbour in 2006 when container traffic was still in operation.

Construction of the new residential area of Jätkäsaari continues as of April 2026, using land freed up after container traffic in the West Harbour was moved to Vuosaari Harbour in 2008. Cargo traffic in the West Harbour continues in the form of trucks driving off of roll-on/roll-off ships.

Immediately next to West Harbour, in the Munkkisaari quarter, there is the Helsinki shipyard in Hietalahti. However, it is not counted as part of the harbour area of Länsisatama.

Länsisatama is also the name of a subdivision of Helsinki, which encompasses a larger area than the harbour alone.

== Ships serving the terminal ==
Company	Ship	Route
(Estonia) Tallink	MS Megastar	Helsinki – Tallinn
(Estonia) Tallink	MS MyStar	Helsinki – Tallinn
(Estonia) Tallink	MS Victoria I	Helsinki – Tallinn
(Finland) Eckerö Line	MS Finlandia	Helsinki – Tallinn

== Usage ==
The harbour is used by around 7 million passengers per year in regular ferry traffic and by about 400 thousand passengers of international cruise ships. The traffic also includes about 1.3 million vehicles per year. Especially heavy-duty cargo traffic in Jätkäsaari is so significant that there are plans to move it underground. The City Council of Helsinki has approved a plan to construct a harbour tunnel from Jätkäsaari to the Länsiväylä highway. In addition, the current pier structure will be expanded and a new field area will be constructed at the southern tip of the harbour area.

The West Harbour employs over 800 people.

== History ==
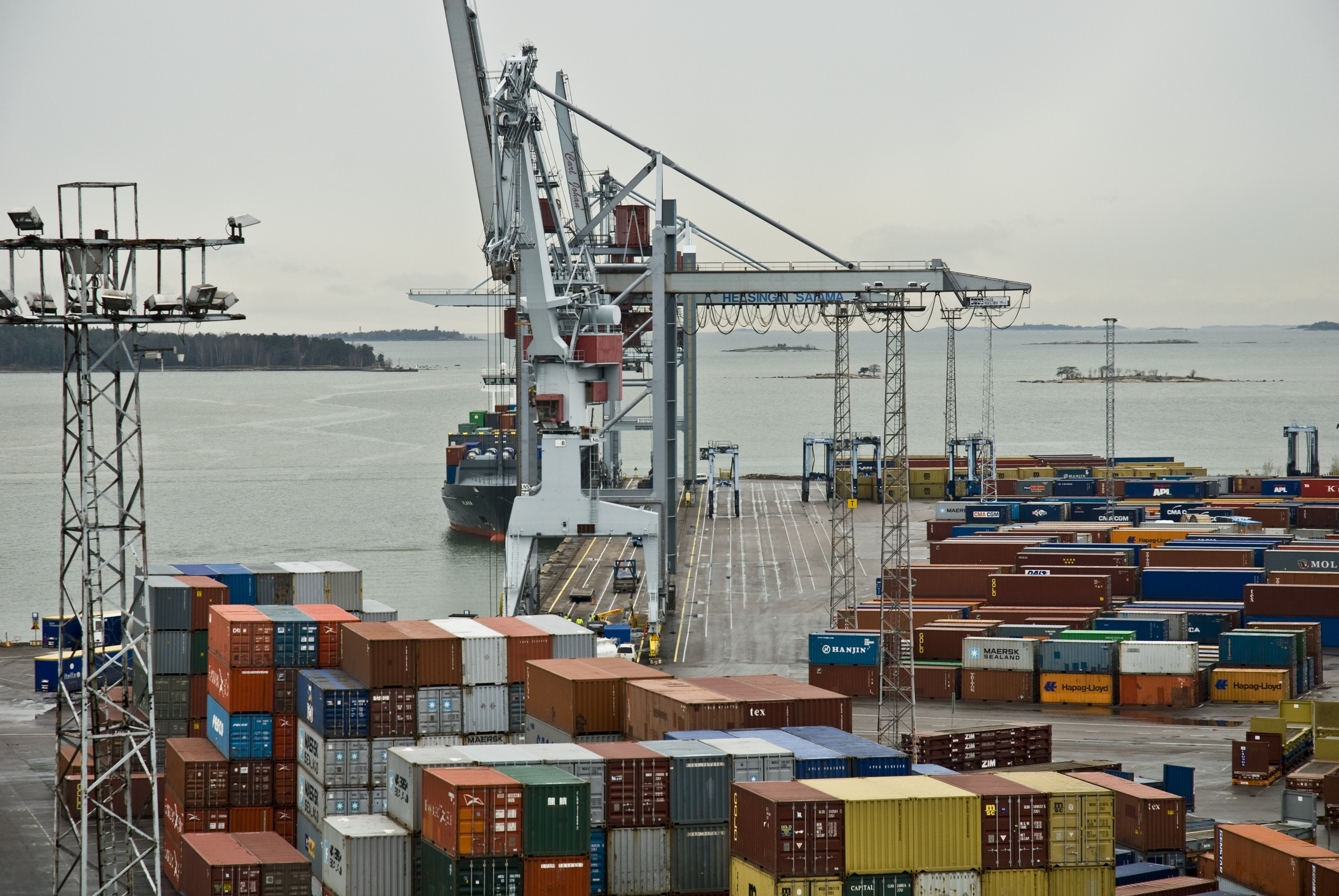
A harbour crane and stacks of containers in Jätkäsaari in October 2008, less than a month before the cargo harbour was moved to Vuosaari.

In the past, the West Harbour was a significant cargo harbour, also known as the Jätkäsaari harbour. It was born in 1911 when the city council granted money for levelling the area. In the next year, Hietasaari and Jätkäsaari were connected to the mainland by a causeway. The zoning plan was approved and construction started in 1913. The total sum granted for the construction was over two million Finnish markka. The plan was based on city engineer Gabriel Idström's statement that the capacity of the South Harbour would not be enough in the future to support marine traffic and trade.

The islands of Hietasaari and Saukko were annexed to the Jätkäsaari harbour area by levelling them and filling the area of sea between them. The seabed was dredged for the use of large ocean ships. In 1916 the area was connected to the Finnish main track line with the Helsinki harbour rail going through Kamppi. The harbour expanded fast during the boom in the 1920s and the name Jätkäsaari was established for the whole harbour area in 1928. The land fillings and the construction of the West Harbour were a solution to the capacity problem, as the Hietalahti harbour next to it built in the 19th century was running out of space.

In the 1930s the harbour area was divided into two parts: the Hietalahti harbour reserved for ocean liners and the Saukko harbour reserved for traffic of coal cargo, opened in 1925. Before World War II the area was developing into the largest harbour in Helsinki. The war interrupted this development, and the record numbers in the 1930s could only be reached again in 1955. In the 1950s the West Harbour was mainly converted into a goods traffic harbour, as traffic of coal cargo was moved to Hanasaari. In terms of traffic, the harbour was the largest in Helsinki since the 1960s, and its expansion continued in the 1970s. At the same time, the Sörnäinen Harbour on the other side of the central area of the city was being expanded, with the sea being filled and islands being connected around it.

In November 2008 the functionality of the container harbour was moved to the new Vuosaari Harbour, and the harbour track was dismantled. This cleared space in Jätkäsaari for thousands of new apartments.
