= Old City Harbour =

Port in Tallinn, Estonia

Old City Harbour (Vanasadam)
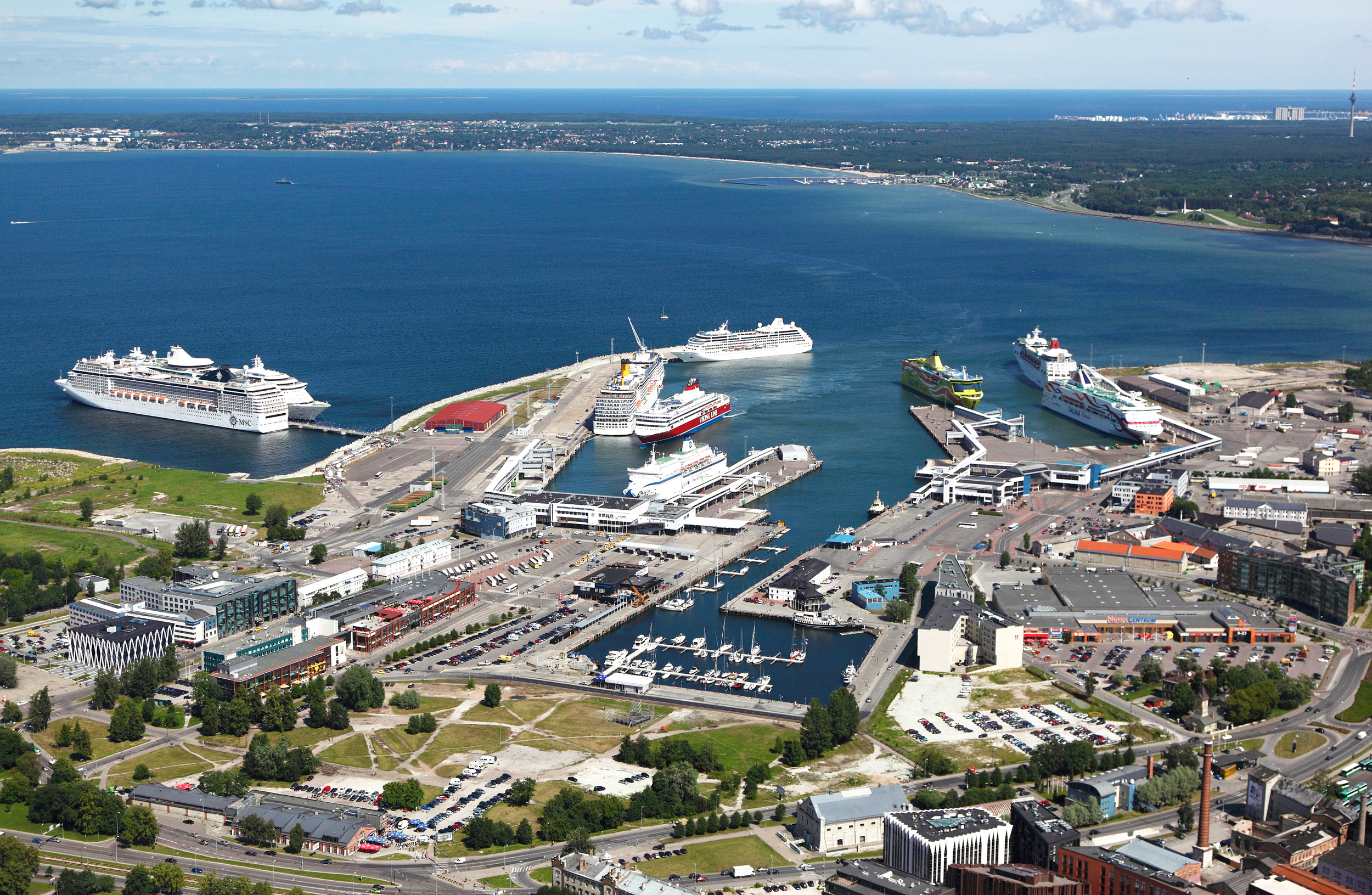
- Old City Harbour, Tallinn, Estonia
- Interactive map of Old City Harbour (Vanasadam)

Location
- Country: Estonia
- Location: Tallinn
- Coordinates: 59°26′40″N 24°46′00″E

Details
- Operated by: Port of Tallinn
- Type of Harbor: passenger harbour, cruise harbour, marina
- Size of harbour: 75.9 ha (aquatory)
- Land area: 52.9 ha
- No. of piers: 27

Statistics
- Passenger traffic: 7.75 million passengers (2023)
- Website http://www.portoftallinn.com/old-city-harbour

The Old City Harbour (Estonian: Vanasadam) is the main passenger harbour in Tallinn, Estonia. Regular lines serve routes to Helsinki (Finland) and Stockholm (Sweden)

== Overview ==
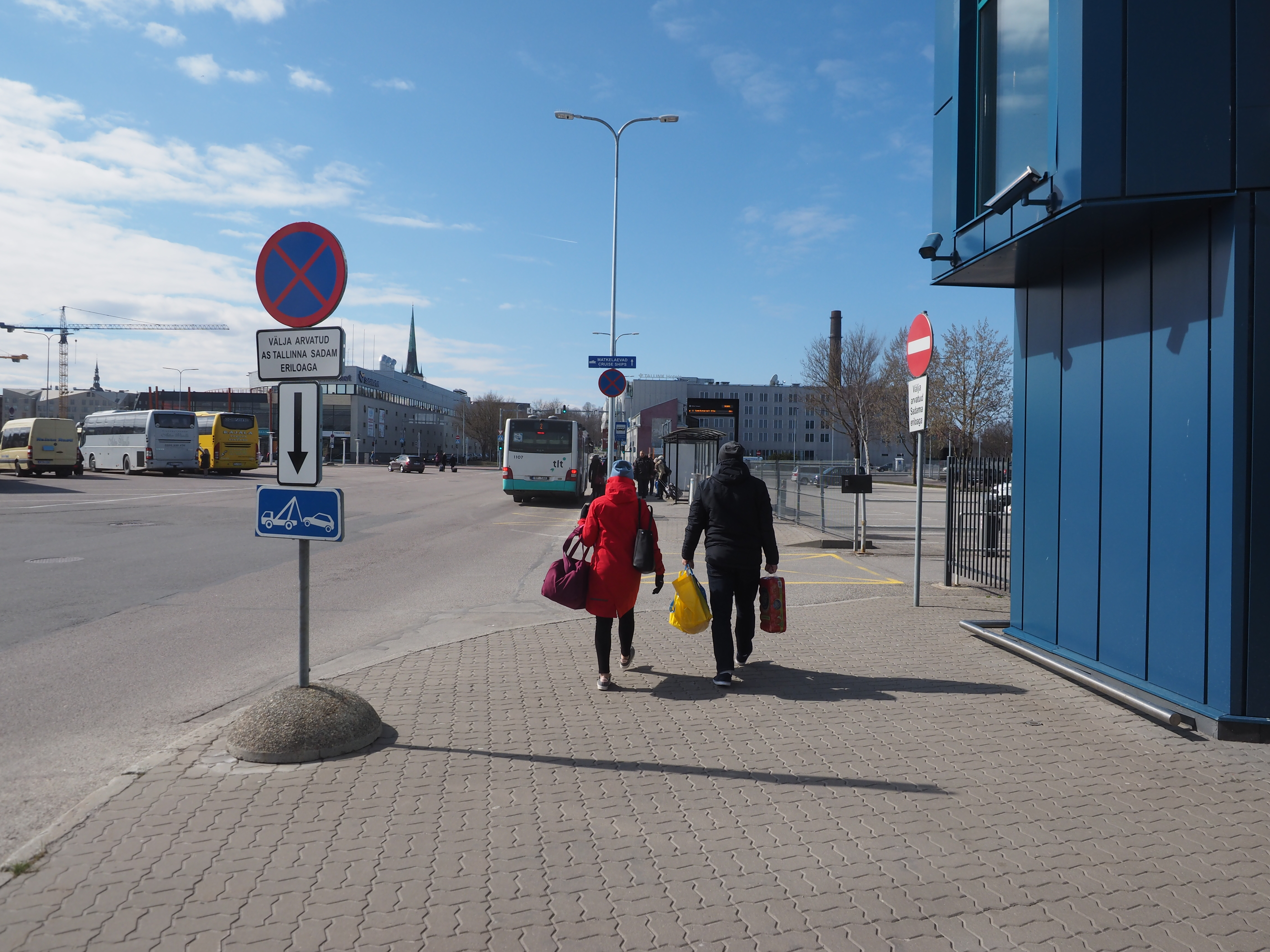
After arriving at the Tallinn Passenger Port, most tourists often walk along Sadama street to the Old Town.

Old City Harbour is one of the five ports within the state-owned company Port of Tallinn. It is one of the biggest and busiest passenger harbours in the world and also the biggest passenger harbour in Estonia. The port operates two passenger terminals (A and D), total length of its berths is 4.2 kilometres. Vessels with maximum length of 340 metres, 42 metres wide and draught of 10.7 m can enter the port. In 2019, the port served 10.64 million passengers.

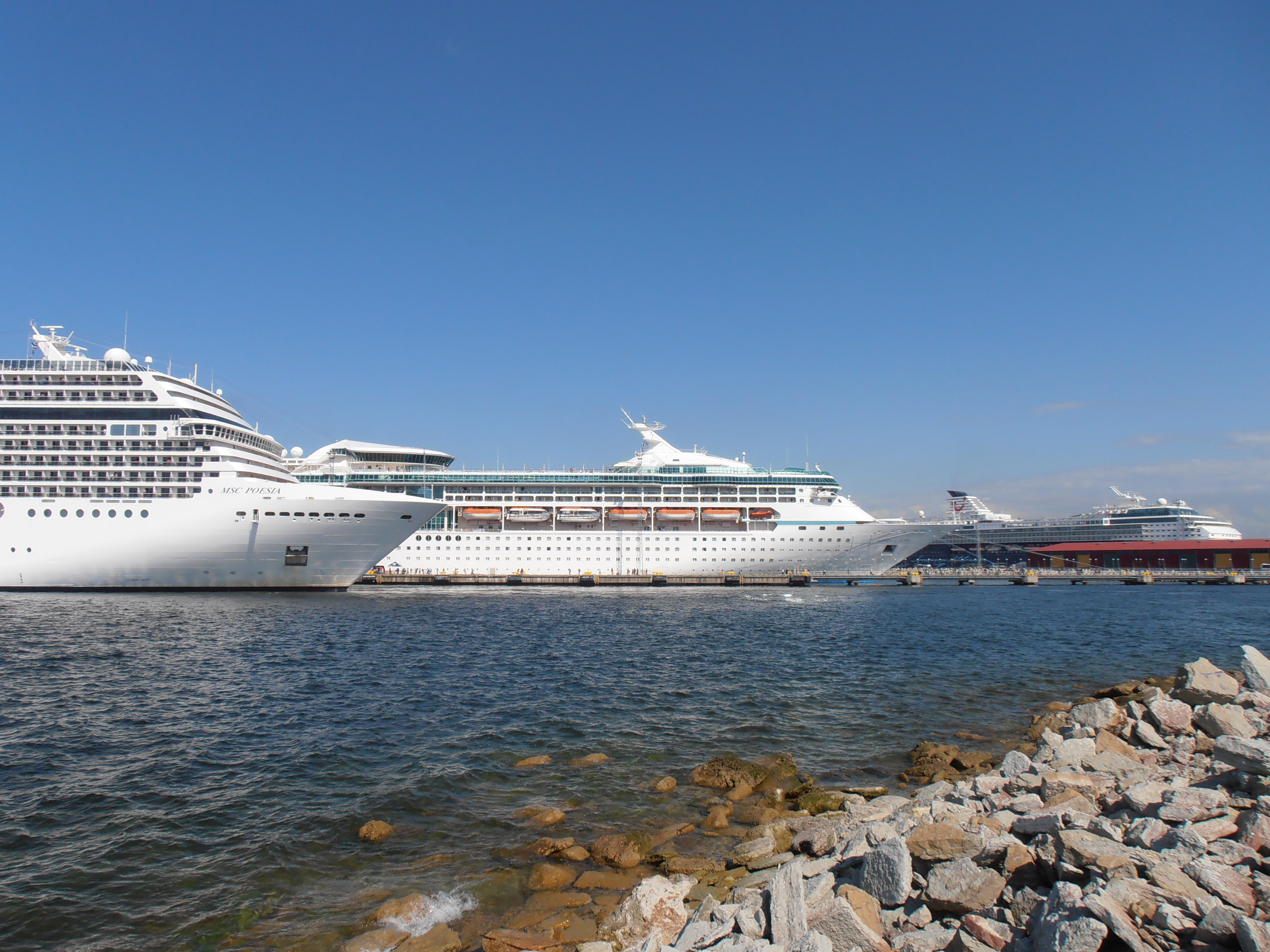
Cruise ships berthed at cruise terminal

The port is operating 339-metre long quay intended for cruise ships. It was completed in spring of year 2004 and its cost at the time was over 80 million kroons. The number of the cruise passengers is increasing steadily, also by the implementing of turnarounds in cooperation with Tallinn Airport. In order to cope with that numbers and increasing size of the cruise ships arriving in Tallinn, Port of Tallinn started in May 2013 the construction of the new quay next to the existing cruise ships quay in the Old City harbour. The total length of the quay built by the Estonian branch of BMGS is 421 metres. With the new quay, the Port of Tallinn is able to moor cruise ships up to 340 metres in length, up to 42 metres in width, and with the draft of up to nine metres. The total cost of the project was 9.34 million euros.

Also Old City Marina - a new marina for recreational vessels established in 2010 - is a part of Tallinn's Old City Harbour.

On 29 September 2017 at the EU Digital Summit in Tallinn, a partnership of Ericsson, Intel and Telia Estonia announced that they had implemented the first live public 5G network in Europe at the Tallinn Passenger Port to connect with Tallink cruise ships at the port.

== Terminals ==
=== A-terminal ===
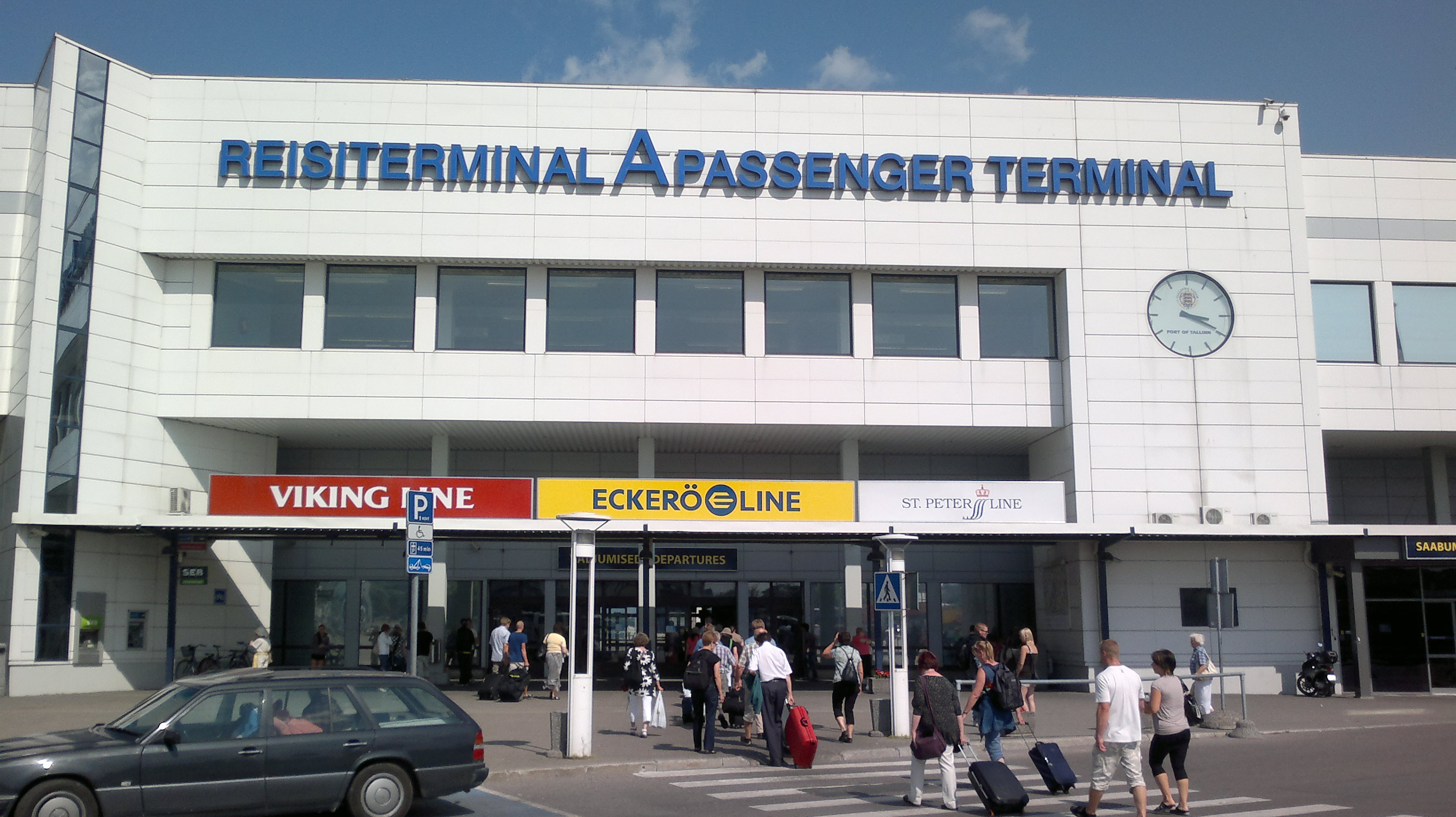
The A-terminal building

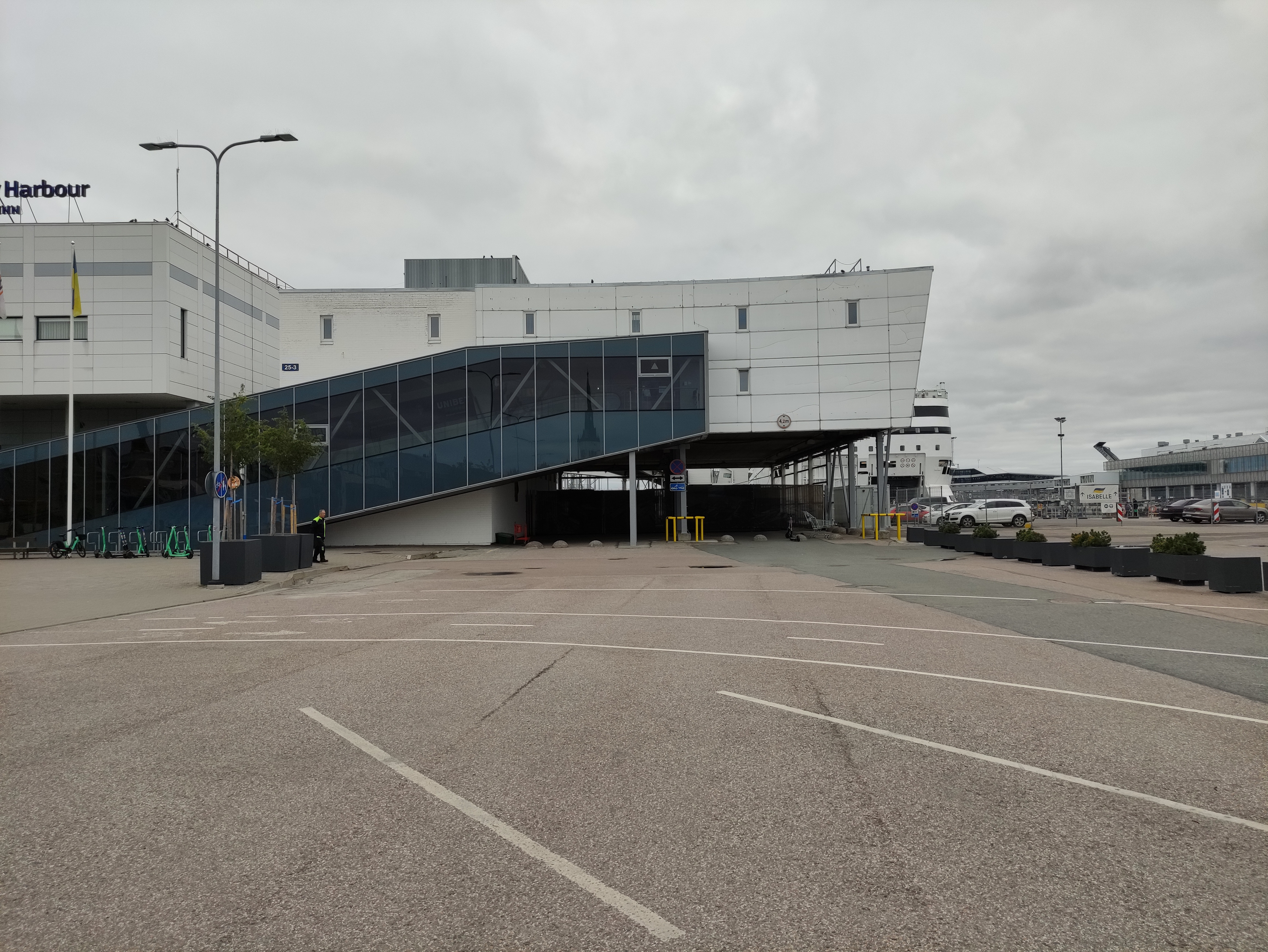
The former B-terminal building which now is part of A-terminal

Shipping companies Eckerö Line and Viking Line operate scheduled services from A-terminal to Helsinki. The A-terminal and the old B-terminal are connected to each other to provide more efficient passenger flow.

Terminal is served by tram line no T2.

Ships serving the terminal are:

Company	Ship	Route
(Finland) Eckerö Line	MS Finlandia	Tallinn – Helsinki
(Finland) Viking Line	MS Viking XPRS	Tallinn – Helsinki
(Finland) Viking Line	MS Viking Cinderella / MS Gabriella (during the summer season)	Tallinn – Helsinki – Mariehamn – Stockholm

=== D-terminal ===
The shipping company Tallink operates scheduled services from D-terminal to Stockholm and Helsinki. Over six million passengers travel through this ferry terminal annually. The terminal building was renovated in 2020 and the cost was 18.5 million euros.

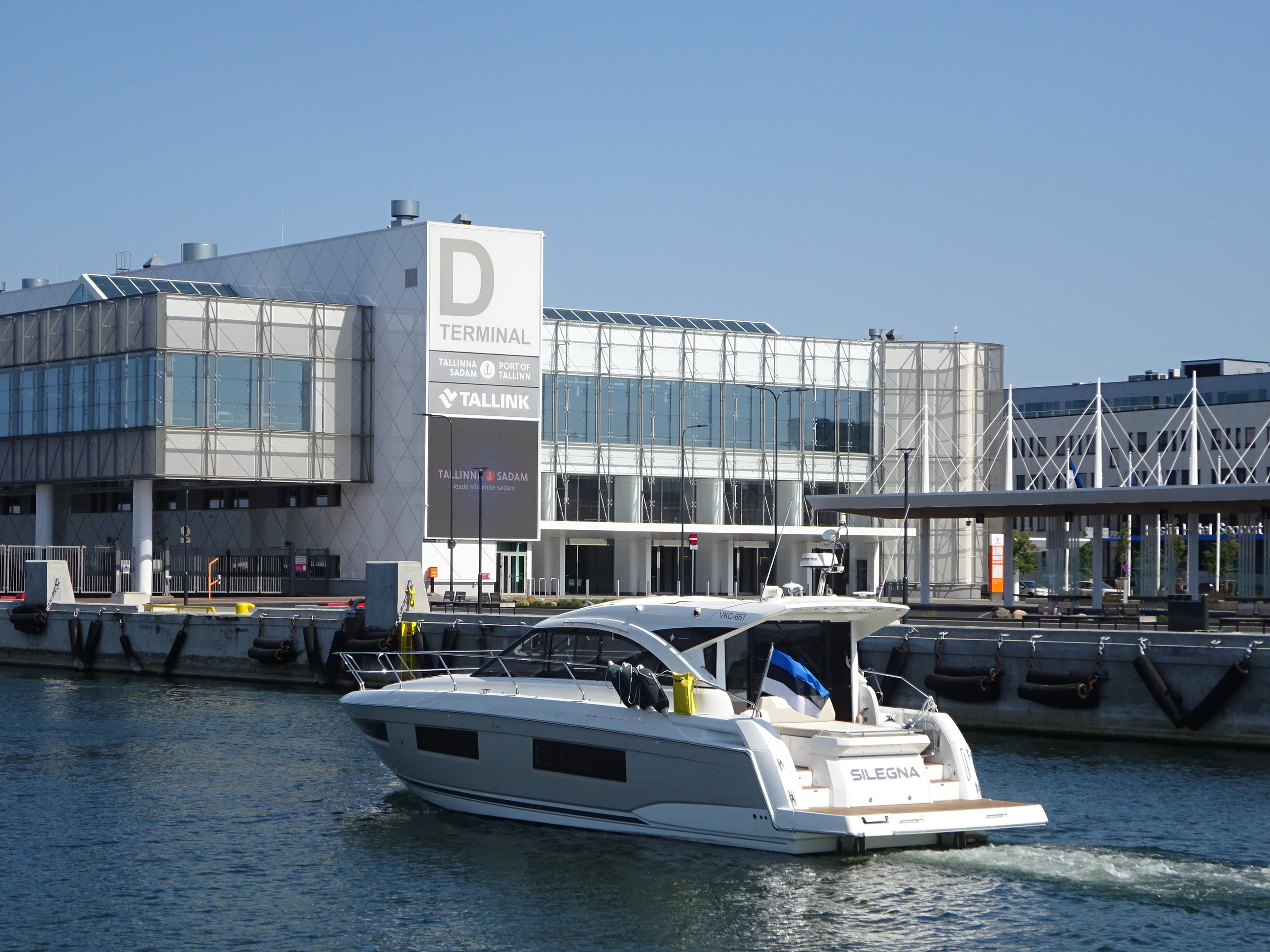
D-terminal in 2023

The terminal is served by bus lines 19, 25 and 66

Ships serving the terminal include:

Company	Ship	Route
(Estonia) Tallink	MS Megastar	Tallinn – Helsinki
(Estonia) Tallink	MS MyStar	Tallinn – Helsinki
(Estonia) Tallink	MS Baltic Queen	Tallinn – Mariehamn – Stockholm
(Estonia) Tallink	MS Victoria I	Tallinn – Helsinki

== Carriers and destinations ==
=== Regular carriers ===
Carriers	Destinations	Terminal
Eckerö Line	Helsinki	A
Tallink	Helsinki, Mariehamn, Stockholm	D
Viking Line	Helsinki Seasonal: Mariehamn, Stockholm	A

=== Cruise carriers (incl. all cruise ports) ===
Carriers	Destinations
MSC Cruise	Aarhus, Ålesund, Barcelona, Bergen, Copenhagen, Cork, Dover, Dublin, Flåm, Genoa, Gibraltar, Gothenborg, Greenock, Gdynia, Hamburg, Hellesylt/Geiranger, Helsinki, Haugesund, Ivergordon, Kiel, Klaipeda, Kotka, A Coruña, Le Havre, Lisbon, Marseille, Olden, Riga, Rotterdam, Saint Petersburg, Stavanger, Stockholm, Valencia, Visby, Warnemunde, Zeebrugge
Norwegian Cruise Line	Amsterdam, Brussels, Copenhagen, Gdynia, Helsinki, Klaipeda, Le Havre, Riga, Rostock, Saint Petersburg, Southampton, Stockholm, Warnemunde
Royal Caribbean	Aarhus, Amsterdam, Copenhagen, Fredericia, Helsinki, Klaipeda, Oslo, Riga, Saint Petersburg, Skagen, Southampton, Stavanger, Stockholm, Visby, Warnemunde

== Statistics ==
Annual passenger statistics for Tallinn Passenger Port
Year	Total passengers
2001	5,739,573
2002	5,944,942
2003	5,862,485
2004	6,737,926
2005	7,007,558
2006	6,760,149
2007	6,514,294
2008	7,247,366
2009	7,257,646
2010	7,915,113
2011	8,478,929
2012	8,841,679
2013	9,236,429
2014	9,569,313
2015	9,793,049
2016	10,173,297
2017	10,560,000
2018	10,619,000
2019	10,639,000
2020	4,333,000
2021	3,665,759
2022	7,213,655
2025	8,300,000

== Gallery ==
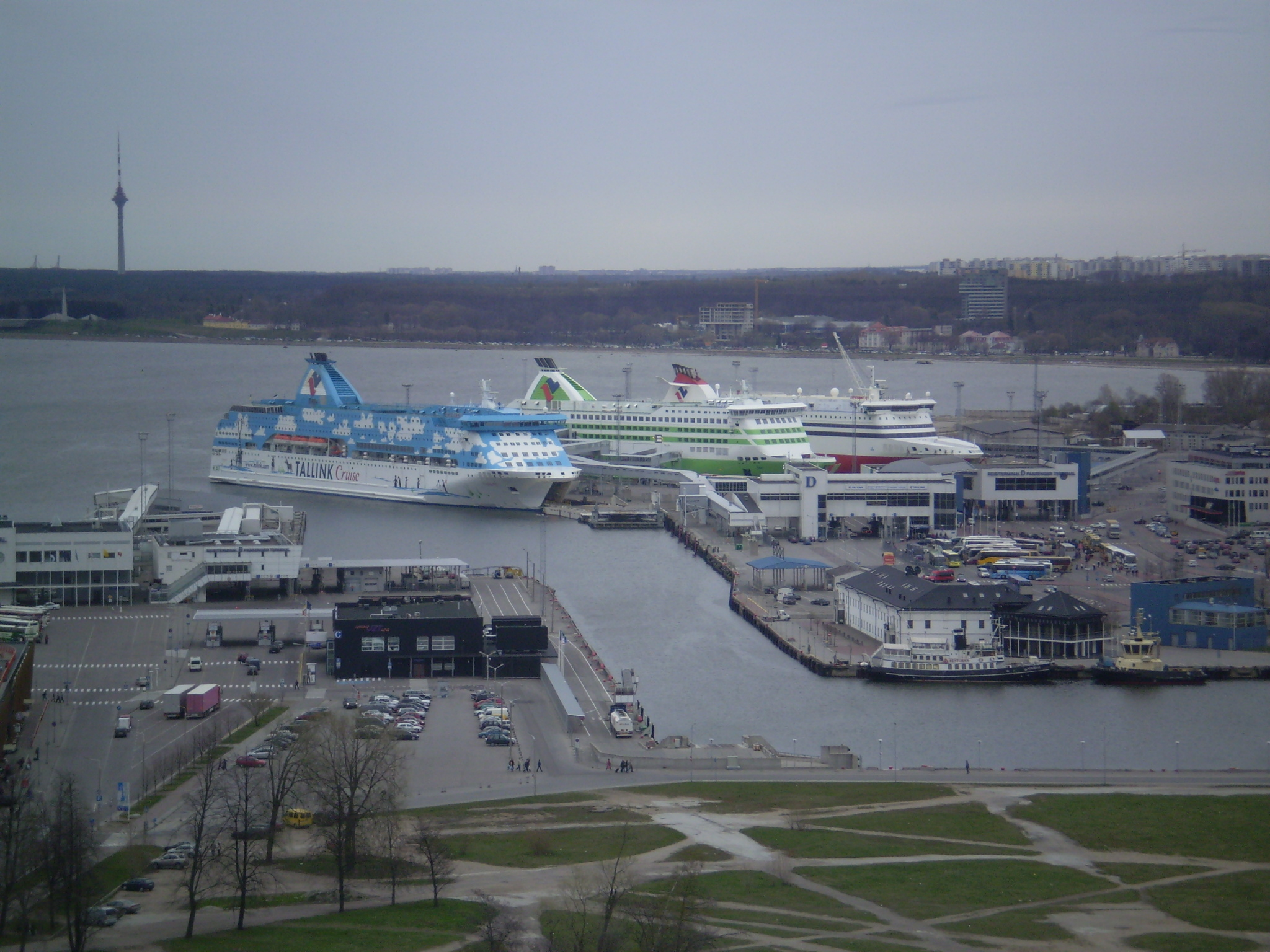

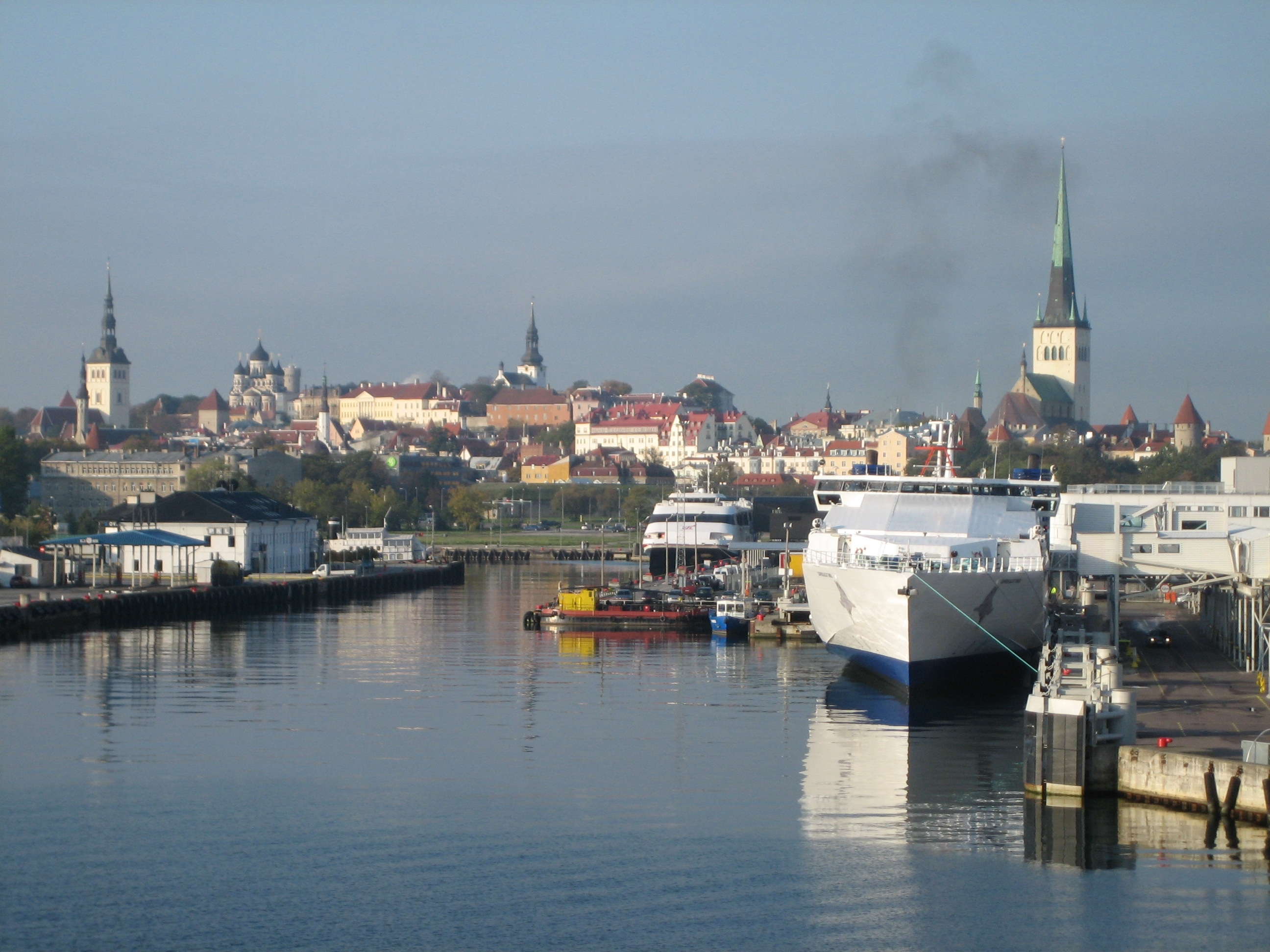

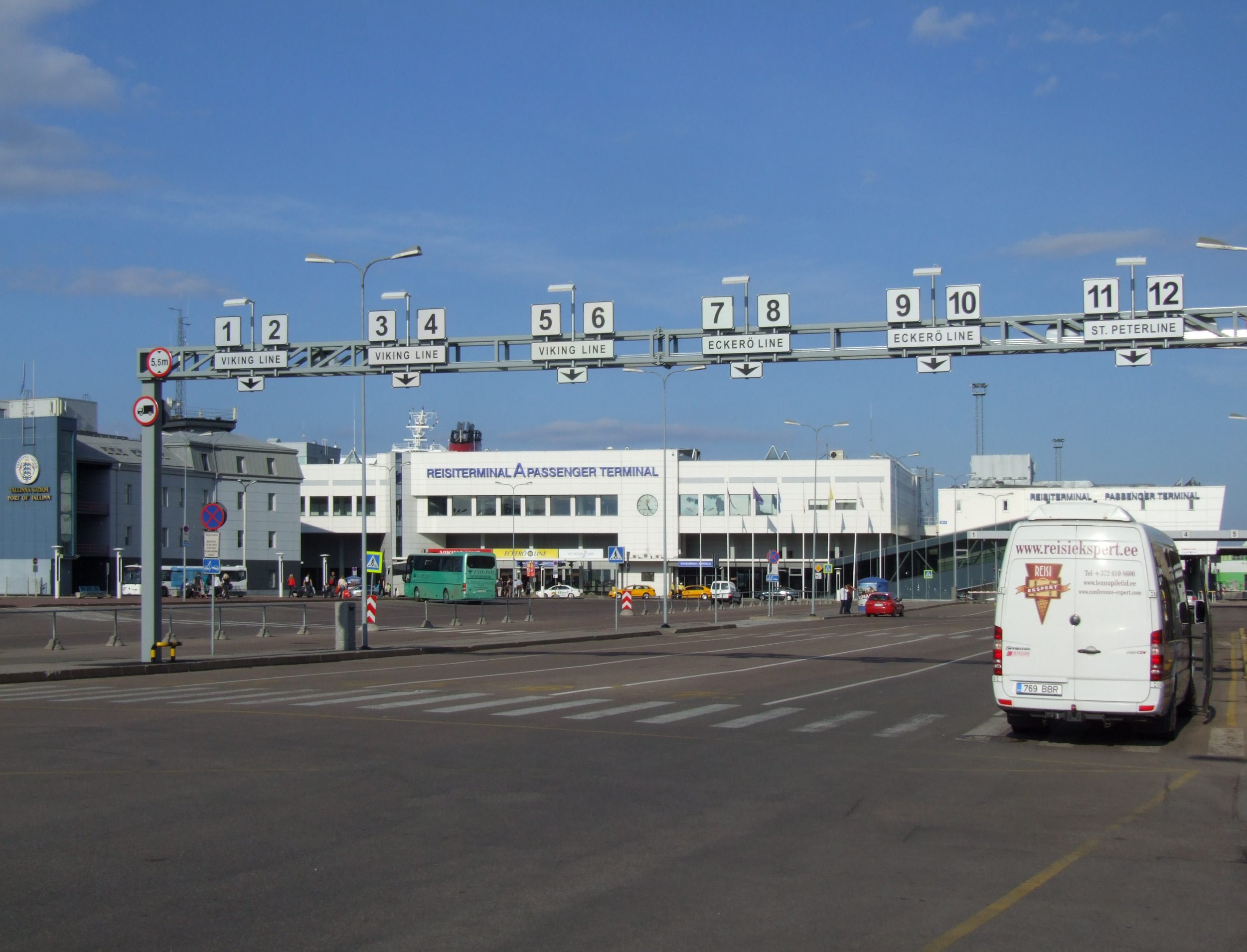
A-terminal in Old City Harbour

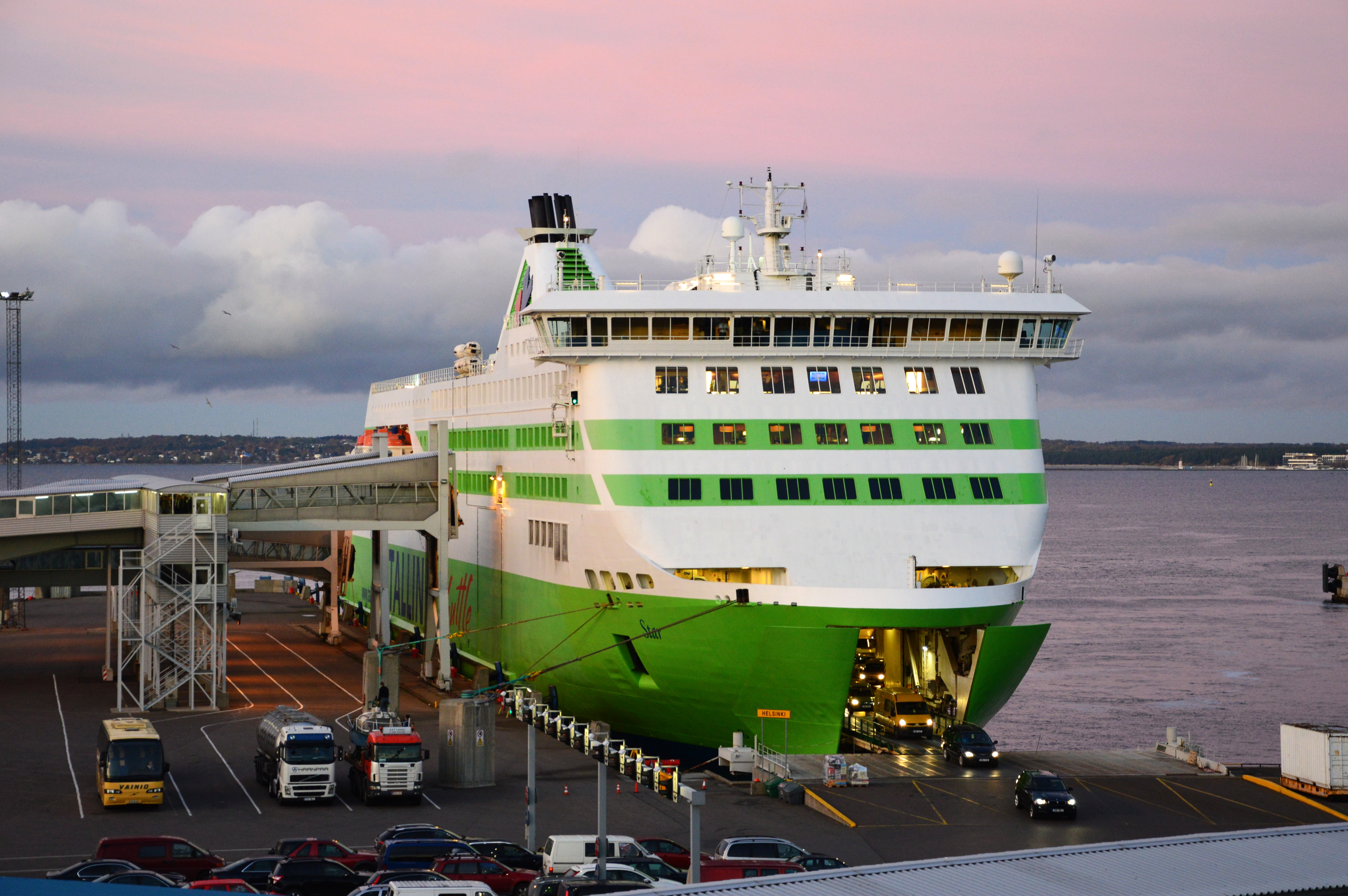
Tallinn Passenger Port, seen from the rooftop of Portus hotel

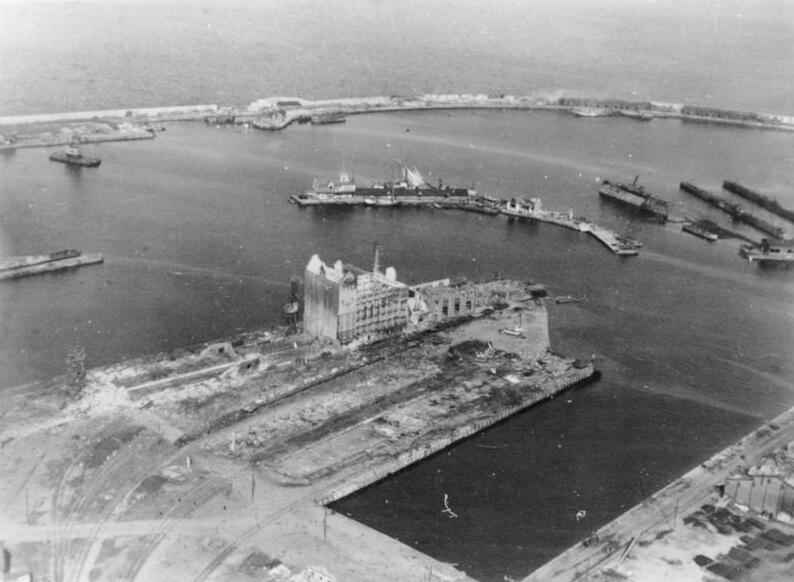
Harbour in 1941.

== See also ==
- Baltic Sea cruiseferries
- Transport in Estonia
