= MS Almariya =

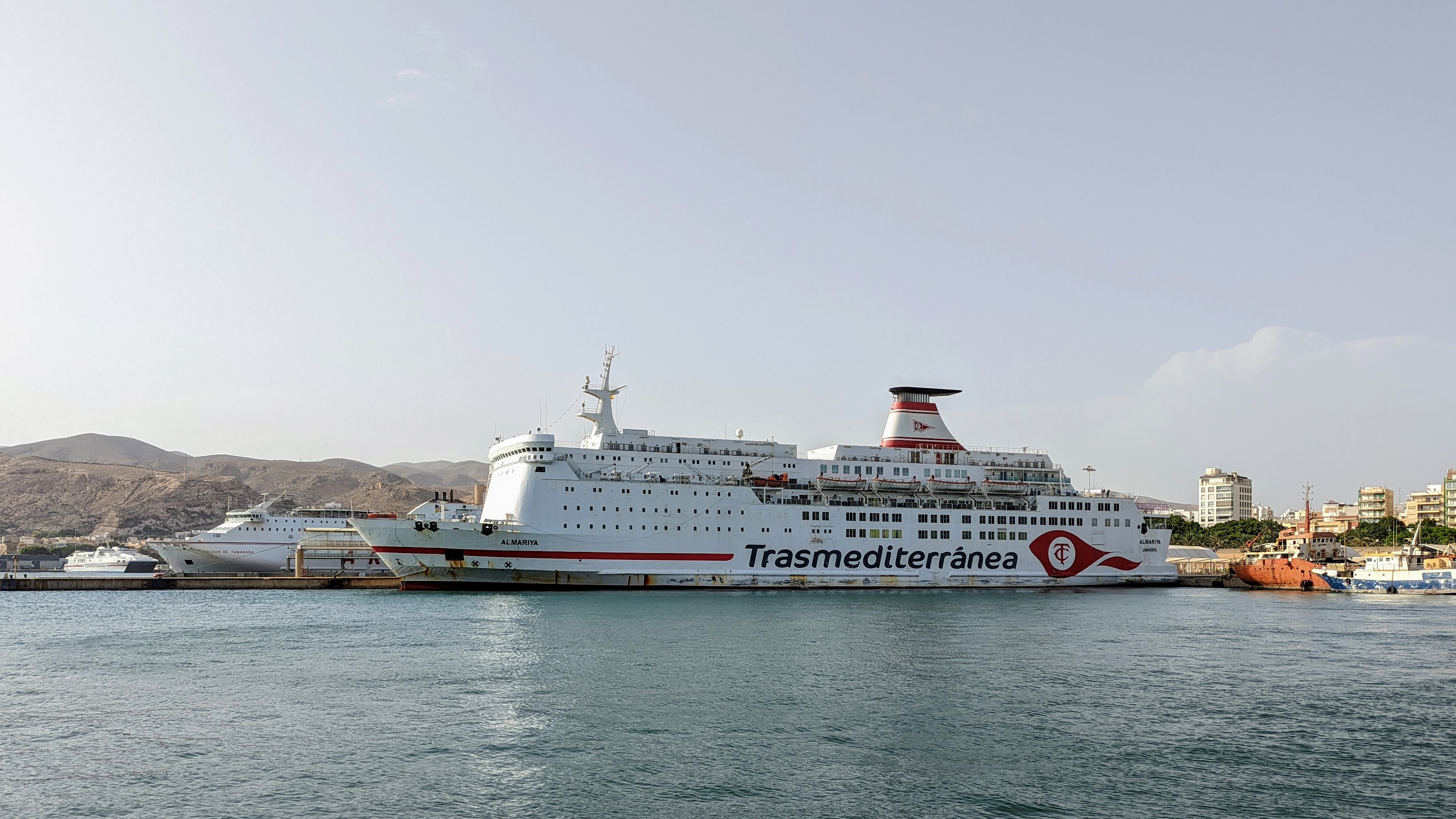
- Almariya in Almeria

History
- Name: 1981–1989: Olau Hollandia; 1989–1998: Nord Gotlandia; 1998–2013: Nordlandia; 2013-2016: Isabella 1; 2016 onwards: Almariya
- Owner: 1981–1989: Olau Line Ltd Co; 1989–1998: Nordström & Thulin Ab; 1998–2013: Rederi Ab Eckerö; 2013-2016: Isabella Cruises Co Ltd; 2016 onwards: Cia Trasmediterránea SA
- Operator: 1981–1989: Olau Line; 1989–1997: Gotlandslinjen; 1998–2013: Eckerö Line; 2013-2016: Isabella Cruises; 2016 onwards: Trasmediterránea
- Port of registry: 1981–1989: Hamburg, Germany; 1989–1998: Visby, Sweden; 1998–2013: Eckerö, Åland; 2013–2015: Belize City, Belize; 2015 onwards: Limassol, Cyprus
- Route: Almería–Nador
- Builder: AG Weser Seebeckwerft, Bremerhaven, West Germany
- Yard number: 1028
- Launched: 22 November 1980
- Acquired: 21 March 1981
- Identification: Call sign: 5BFT4; IMO number: 7928811; MMSI number: 210556000
- Status: in active service

General characteristics
- Type: Cruiseferry → Passenger ferry
- Tonnage: 21,473 GT
- Length: 153.40 m (503 ft 3 in)
- Beam: 24.20 m (79 ft 5 in)
- Draught: 5.82 m (19 ft 1 in)
- Ice class: 1 A
- Propulsion: 4 × Pielstick OC2-5L diesels; 15,300 kW (20,518 hp) combined
- Speed: 20 knots (37 km/h; 23 mph)
- Capacity: 2,048 passengers; 938 passenger beds; 530 vehicles (1,500 lane meters)

MS Almariya is a cruiseferry owned by the shipping company Trasmediterránea on their route connecting Almería, Spain, to Nador, Morocco. She was built in 1981 by AG Weser Seebeckswerft, Bremerhaven, West Germany for Olau Line as MS Olau Hollandia. Between 1989 and 1997 she sailed as MS Nord Gotlandia for Gotlandslinjen, between 1998 and 2013 as MS Nordlandia for Finnish shipping company Eckerö Line and was initially named MS Isabella 1 in Isabella Cruises service.

== History ==
=== Olau Line ===
MS Olau Hollandia was the first newbuild ever to be built for Olau Line. Up until that point the company had operated with used ships purchased or chartered from other companies, but after TT-Line acquired Olau in 1979, the new owners invested in building two new cruiseferries for the company. The Olau Hollandia and her sister MS Olau Britannia were more than twice the size of the largest ferries operated by Olau before that point (they were also larger than any ships operated by TT-Line at the time). The Olau Hollandia was built to be "NATO-compatible", so that she could easily be converted to a troopship if required. She was also built with a thicker hull than normal, enough to be classified under Finnish ice class 1 A Super (the highest possible class) when she began service on the Baltic Sea without any structural changes to her hull.

On 21 March 1981 the Olau Hollandia was delivered to her owners, and four days later she started operating on Olau Line's Sheerness (United Kingdom)–Vlissingen (the Netherlands) route.

In the late 1980s TT-Line decided to replace the Olau Hollandia and Olau Britannia with two newbuilds, also called MS Olau Hollandia and MS Olau Britannia. In preparation for delivery of the new Olau Hollandia, the old Olau Hollandia was sold to Nordström & Thulin, Sweden in August 1989, to be delivered in October 1989.

=== Gotlandslinjen ===
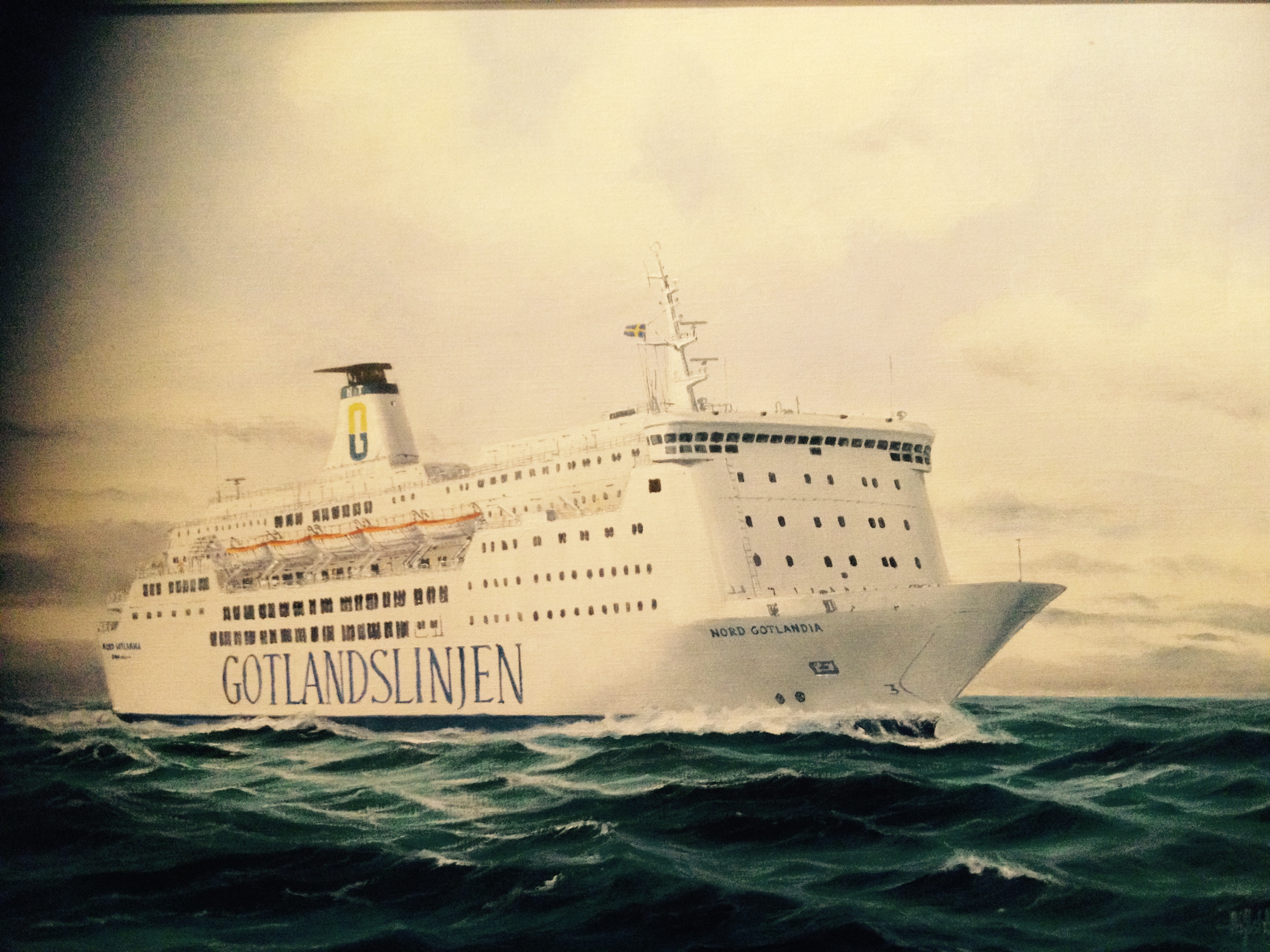
Painting of Nord Gotlandia during service between Gotland and mainland Sweden.

In 1987 Nordström & Thulin had won the state concession to operate ferry services between the island of Gotland and the Swedish mainland for the years 1988–97. N&T marketed their service as Gotlandslinjen, for whose traffic they bought the Olau Hollandia. Between October and December the Olau Hollandia was rebuilt at AG Weser Seebeckwerft and renamed MS Nord Gotlandia. After rebuilding she sailed to Stockholm where the ship was displayed to the public. On 1 January 1990 the Nord Gotlandia began service with Gotlandslinjen, on routes from Visby to Nynäshamn and Oskarshamn.

In July 1997 the Nord Gotlandia suffered a fire in the engine room. In the same year the Swedish government held a tender for the state concession for traffic to Gotland for the years 1998–2004, but this time N&T lost the concession to Destination Gotland. At the time N&T also owned 50% of EstLine, but the company decided not to transfer the Nord Gotlandia to EstLine. Instead she was sold to Eckerö Line, Finland in December 1997, to be delivered in January 1998.

=== Eckerö Line ===
On 1 January 1998 the Nord Gotlandia left Visby for Turku Repair Yard, Naantali, Finland, where she was taken over by Eckerö Line the following day. After being rebuilt for her new service, the ship emerged as MS Nordlandia and was placed on Eckerö Line's Helsinki–Tallinn service on 10 February 1998.

The ship damaged one of her propellers when leaving Helsinki on 30 April 2003 and had to be docked in Naantali for five days for repairs. During a hard storm on 28 October 2006 she rammed the quay in Tallinn, resulting in a hole above the waterline. The damage was quickly repaired, and the ship was back in traffic on 1 November.

In January 2011, the ship was docked in Naantali for eleven days (3–14 January 2011).

In December 2012 she was replaced by MS Finlandia.
