= Port of Helsinki =

- Interactive map of Port of Helsinki
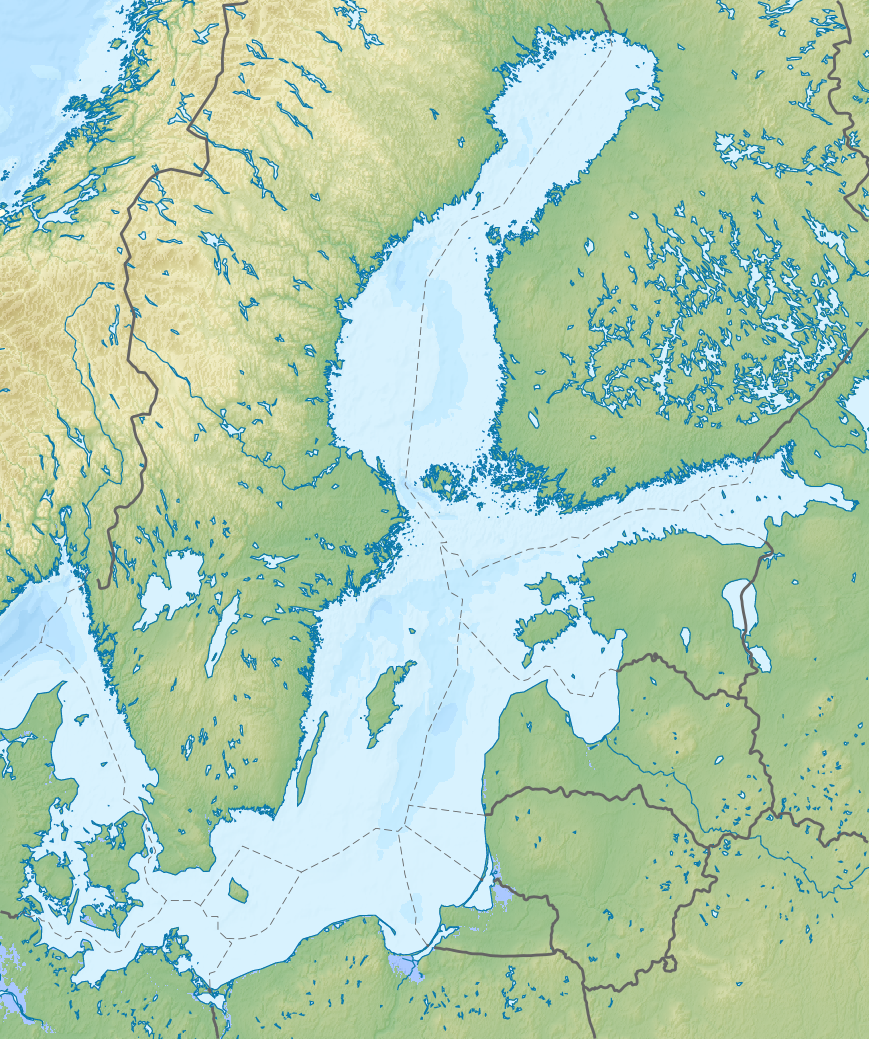
- Location within Baltic Sea

Location
- Country: Finland
- Location: Helsinki
- Coordinates: 60°09′53″N 24°57′30″E
- UN/LOCODE: FIHEL

Details
- Operated by: Port of Helsinki Ltd
- Owned by: City of Helsinki

Statistics
- Annual cargo tonnage: 13.4 million (2025)
- Passenger traffic: 9.5 million (2025)
- Annual revenue: €99.6, million (2024)
- Website www.portofhelsinki.fi

The Port of Helsinki (Finnish: Helsingin Satama, Swedish: Helsingfors Hamn) is one of the busiest passenger ports in Europe and the main port for foreign trade and passenger traffic in Finland.

For passenger traffic, the port operates regular liner connections to destinations such as Tallinn, Stockholm, and Travemünde, serving a total volume of 9.5 million passengers in 2025. The port's busiest route is between Helsinki and Tallinn, with 7.5 million passengers travelling between the two cities in 2025. Additionally, it is a popular destination for international cruise ships with 520,000 passenger arrivals in 2018.

As Finland's leading cargo port, a total of 13.4 million tonnes of goods were transported in 2025. The main export commodities are products for the forest industry, machinery and equipment, whereas in imports the most prominent product group are daily consumer goods.

In 2017, the Port of Helsinki acquired a majority stake in the Port of Loviisa, situated some 70 kilometres (43 mi) east of Helsinki.

The port is owned by the city of Helsinki and operated by Port of Helsinki Ltd.

The current port traffic volumes and urban population categorize Helsinki as a Large-Port City

== Harbours ==
Helsinki Harbours

The Port of Helsinki consists of three active harbours.

=== South Harbour ===
The South Harbour (Finnish: Eteläsatama, Swedish: Södra hamnen) is a bay and harbour area immediately next to the centre of the city of Helsinki. Silja Line operates from the Olympia Terminal on the west side of the bay, whereas Viking Line operates from the Katajanokka Terminal on the east side of the bay. Silja Line and Viking Line each operate one ferry to Stockholm via Mariehamn per day, and Viking Line also has multiple departures to Tallinn every day. Silja Line's MS Silja Serenade and MS Silja Symphony depart on alternate days to Stockholm Värtahamnen (via Mariehamn), Viking Line's MS Gabriella departs every second day to Stockholm Stadsgården (via Mariehamn) and MS Viking XPRS has multiple departures to Tallinn Terminal A every day. The Makasiini Terminal is also located on the west side of the bay but has been closed since the only regular operator, Linda Line, went bankrupt in 2017.

=== West Harbour ===
The West Harbour (Finnish: Länsisatama, Swedish: Västra hamnen) is a passenger and cargo harbour in the Jätkäsaari district of Helsinki. The harbour features two terminals: the older Terminal 1, and the newer Terminal 2 (completed in 2017). St Peter Line’s cruise service to St Petersburg with MS Princess Anastasia operated from Terminal 1. Tallink’s shuttle ferries MS MyStar, MS Megastar and MS Star to Tallinn Terminal D as well as Eckerö Line’s shuttle ferry MS Finlandia to Tallinn Terminal A operate from Terminal 2. The West Harbour area also includes the Munkkisaari Quay on the west side of neighbouring Munkkisaari, used by cruise ships in the summer. There is no terminal here, and cruise passengers are transported to Central Helsinki by shuttle buses.

=== Vuosaari Harbour ===
Vuosaari Harbour (Finnish: Vuosaaren satama, Swedish: Nordsjö hamn) is located in the suburb of Vuosaari and was opened in November 2008. It replaced the North Harbour and Laajasalo Oil Harbour and serves primarily container and Roll-on/roll-off traffic. The majority of passenger services operate from the other two harbours in Central Helsinki with the exception of Finnlines’ daily service to Travemünde on MS Finnstar, MS Finnmaid and MS Finnlady. Passengers on this ferry service check in at the Hansa Terminal and are transported to the ship by bus.

== See also ==
- Ports of the Baltic Sea
