= Rederiaktiebolaget Eckerö =

Finnish holding company

- Type: Aktiebolag
- Headquarters: Mariehamn, Åland, Finland
- Services: Group holding company
- Website: www.rederiabeckero.ax

Rederiaktiebolaget Eckerö is a Finnish holding company based at Mariehamn in Åland. The principal constituents of the group are:

- Birka Cruises, a company operating Baltic cruises from Stockholm in Sweden. Services terminated in 2020 and 50% of the only ship is owned by Viking Line
- Eckerö Line, a company operating car ferry services between Helsinki in Finland and Tallinn in Estonia.
- Eckerö Linjen, a company operating car ferry services between Berghamn in the Åland Islands and Grisslehamn in Sweden.
- Eckerö Shipping, a company providing freight shipment services between Finland and Sweden
- Williams Buss, a company providing bus services in the Åland Islands.

== Current fleet ==
Current as of 7 February 2026.

Ship	Type	Built	Entered service	Gross tonnage	Passengers (max)	Lane meters	Knots	Route	Flag and home port	Image
MS Eckerö	Cruiseferry	1979	2005–	12,358 GT	1.635	515 m	20	Eckerö – Grisslehamn	Grisslehamn, Sweden	
MS Finlandia	Cruiseferry	2001	2012–	36,365 GT	2.520	1.808 m	27	Helsinki – Tallinn	(Åland) Eckerö, Finland	
MS Finbo Cargo	Ro-Pax	2000	2019–	22,152 GT	366	2.000	22,5	Vuosaari – Muuga	(Åland) Eckerö, Finland	
MS Fjärdvägen	Ro-Ro	1972	2025–	8,990 GT	12	780	17,5	For sale, laid up in Mariehamn.	(Åland) Mariehamn, Finland	
MS Fjärdvägen	Ro-Pax	1987	2026–	20,783 GT	119	1.647	20,5	Långnäs – Naantali	(Åland) Eckerö, Finland	
MS Eckerö Link	Ro-Pax	1986	2026–	19,763 GT	900	1,265	21,3	Långnäs – Naantali	Grisslehamn, Sweden	

== Bibliography ==
- Sjöström, Pär-Henrik; Brzoza, Krzysztof (2011). Historien om den som kommer igen: Rederiaktiebolaget Eckerö 1961–2011. Ekenäs tryckeri. ISBN 9529285914.
