= Elenger =

Company based in Estonia

AS Elenger Grupp (previous Eesti Gaas)
- Industry: Oil and gas
- Headquarters: Tallinn, Estonia
- Area served: Estonia; Latvia; Lithuania; Finland; Poland; Germany
- Key people: Margus Kaasik (Chairman of the Board)
- Products: Natural gas Electric power CNG; LNG
- Services: Natural gas sale and distribution
- Parent: AS Infortar
- Subsidiaries: AS Gaasivõrk; AS GASO (Latvia); SIA Elenger (Latvia); UAB Elenger (Lithuania); Elenger OY (Finland); Elenger Sp. z o.o (Poland); Elenger Polska Sp.z o.o. Elenger Dystrybucja Sp. z o.o. Elenger Marine OÜ (Estonia)
- Website: www.elenger.ee

AS Elenger Grupp (previous Eesti Gaas) is an energy company with headquarters in Tallinn, Estonia. The company's main activity is selling and distributing of natural gas in Estonian, Latvian, Finnish, Lithuanian, Polish and German markets. Elenger product portfolio includes also LNG, CNG, and electricity, including solar energy.

== History ==
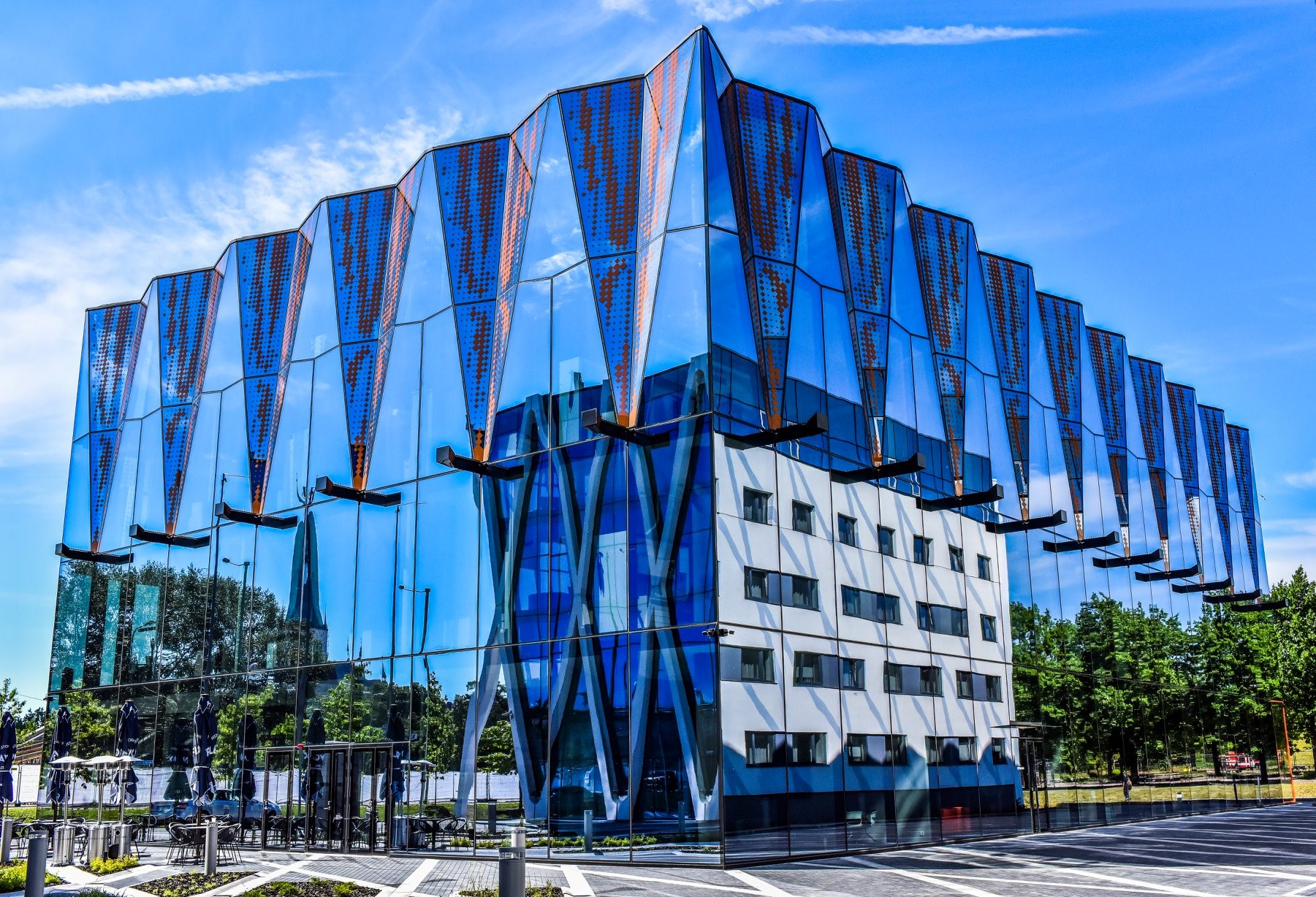
Eesti Gaas headquarters on Sadama tänav 7 in Tallinn (July 2019 - November 2023).

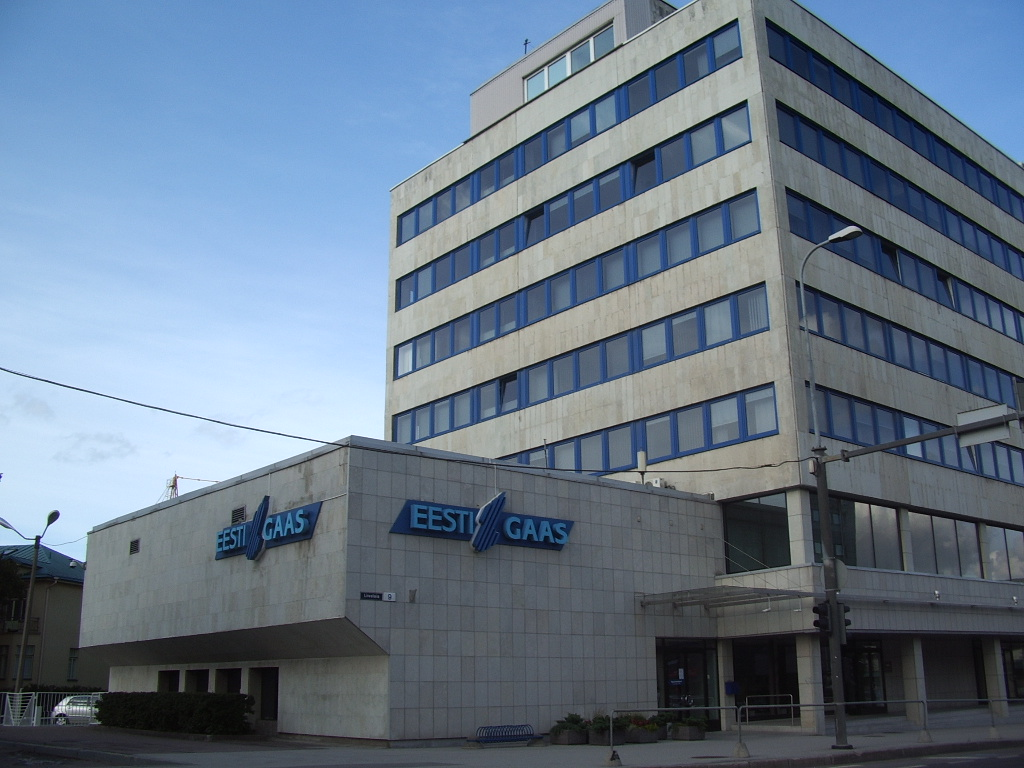
The former headquarters of Eesti Gaas on Liivalaia 9 in Tallinn (August 2008). The building was designed by Miia Masso and demolished in 2021.

The seed of company was planted on December 15, 1864, when Riga businessmen Mr. William Weir & Comp signed a concession agreement with the city of Reval (Tallinn), the capital of Estonia, for the construction and operation of a gas factory and water line in the city. The agreement was approved by His Imperial Majesty Alexander II.

In 1865, the first gas factory in Tallinn was completed, where the production of artificial gas from English coal began, which was initially used for street lighting. On December 17, the first gas lantern was lit on Tallinn Town Hall Square.

In 1948, the first gas transport company in Estonia was established From 1948–1957 it transported Estonian oil shale gas through the Kohtla-Järve – Leningrad pipeline to Leningrad, Later the pipeline was used in traverse mode to transport Russian natural gas to Estonia.

From 1963–1988, the company existed as the "General Administration of Gasification" under the Council of Ministers of the Estonian SSR. In 1988, the name 'Eesti Gaas' was first introduced, and in 1990, it became a state enterprise. In 1993, AS Eesti Gaas was incorporated. The company was partly privatized in 1993–1995. In 1993, a 30% stake in Eesti Gaas was transferred to Lentransgaz (now: Gazprom Transgaz Saint Petersburg), a subsidiary of Gazprom, to eliminate the gas debt dispute. In 1994, Ruhrgas (later: E.ON Ruhrgas) acquired about 15% of the company's shares while the management of the company, together with other private investors and the UK-based Baltic Republic Fund, acquired 7.5% of shares both. As a result, the government of Estonia kept a 39% stake. In December 1996, Ruhrgas increased its stake to 21%; 12% was sold to the public. In January 1999, the remaining state-owned shares were sold. Ruhrgas increased its stake up to 32%, Gazprom kept its 30% stake, and Neste (later Fortum) got a 10% stake. Later that year, Itera (now part of Rosneft) Latvian branch acquired nearly 10% stake from the Baltic Republic Fund. In following years, Gazprom increased its stake up to 37%, E.ON up to 33.66%, and Fortum up to 17.7% by buying shares from private investors. In 2014, E.ON sold its stake to Fortum, which became the largest shareholder with 51.4% stake. In February 2016, it was announced that Fortum will sell its stake to Trilini Energy, a company controlled by the investment firm Infortar, the major shareholder of the shipping company Tallink. Later, Trilini also acquired 50.9% of the shares owned previously by Gazprom and 1.15% of the shares owned by minority shareholders. Since 2016, the sole owner of Eesti Gaas has been the investment company Infortar.

In 1998, all regional subsidiaries of Eesti Gaas were merged into the parent company. In December 2004, the gas infrastructure construction activities were transferred to the separate subsidiary, AS EG Ehitus. In 2005, the gas grid services (transmission and distribution) were transferred to the newly established subsidiary company EG Võrguteenus. In 2013, the distribution network was separated from EG Võrguteenus into a newly established subsidiary of Eesti Gaas, AS Gaasivõrgud. In 2014, to implement the EU third energy package EG Võrguteenus was separated from Eesti Gaas.

In 2013, Eesti Gaas started to sell electricity.

In January 2018, Eesti Gaas started supplying liquefied natural gas (LNG) for the Tallink's ferry Megastar. In October 2018, Eesti Gaas announced that it will order 6,000-cubic-metre LNG barge for bunkering of ships in the northern and eastern part of the Baltic Sea. The barge would be ready by 2020, and it will be built by Damen Group.

In 2019, Eesti Gaas entered the Lithuanian and Finnish energy markets under the Elenger brand. In 2021, the LNG bunker vessel Optimus was launched.

After Russia's invasion of Ukraine in February 2022, the company made a full-scale LNG turnaround, creating new gas supply chains from the West. It also started sales operations in Poland. In April 2023, Eesti Gaas received the first commercial LNG cargo delivered through Finland's Inkoo terminal.

In July 2023, Eesti Gaas acquired Latvian gas distribution company Gaso from Latvijas Gāze. The shares of the owner company Infortar were first listed on the Nasdaq Tallinn stock exchange in December of the same year.

In 2024, the first gas storage capacity was purchased in Germany. The construction of the first solar park in Latvia was completed. In December 2024, Elenger acquired EWE's Polish energy business for €111.8 million, which included a 2,316-kilometre gas distribution network. The company also changed its name in Estonia, from Eesti Gaas to Elenger, in December.

In December 2025, Elenger announced a €6 million investment to increase battery capacity at its solar parks in Estonia and Latvia to 35 MWh. In June 2026, Infortar opened a €15 million bio methane plant at Halinga in Pärnu County, with Elenger purchasing the plant's entire output and managing its transport and sale.

== Operations ==
Elenger imports, sells and distributes pipeline natural gas, as also compressed natural gas (CNG), including compressed biomethan, as fuel for vehicles and liquefied natural gas (LNG) as fuel for ships. In addition to Estonia, Elenger also sells energy in Latvia, Lithuania, Finland and Poland.

Elenger has 11 CNG stations in Estonia which sell also biomethane. It provides LNG bunkering services to LNG-powered ships in Tallinn, Helsinki, and Hanko. The company delivers LNG by trucks from the LNG plant in Klaipeda LNG terminal in Lithuania, as also from Finland and Poland. Starting in 2022, the company will purchase natural gas from Norway and the USA, delivering it to the Klaipeda and Inkoo (Finland) terminals by LNG ships.

Elenger's subsidiaries AS Gaasivõrk owns and operates the natural gas distribution network in Estonia, AS Gaso in Latvia and Elenger Dystrybutcja Sp.z o.o. in Poland. Elenger also sells electricity and owns stakes in solar parks with a total capacity around 4 MW. In 2021 received its first LNG bunkering ship which was named Optimus.

== See also ==
- Energy in Estonia
