= G. W. Sundmans =

Restaurant in Helsinki, Finland

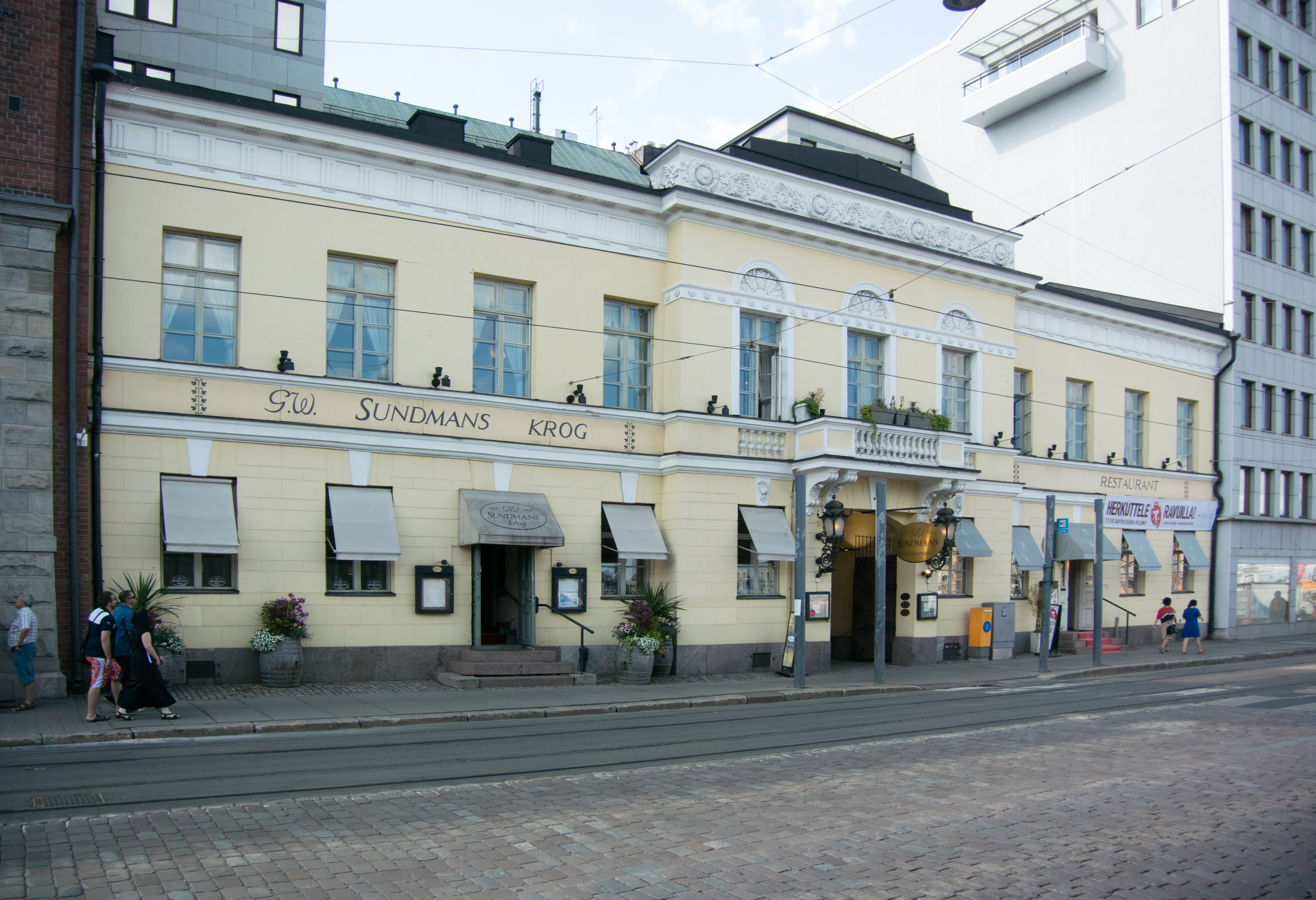
Restaurant G. W. Sundmans, 2014.

G. W. Sundmans was a restaurant on the Eteläranta street in central Helsinki, Finland. The restaurant closed down in 2015. The restaurant was built in an old bourgeois house in Helsinki, consisting of five rooms, two office rooms, an auditorium and a wine cellar suitable for various events and tastings.

The restaurant was named after ship captain and merchant Gustaf Wilhelm Sundman (1777 - 1835), who commissioned the house from 1817 to 1820. The house was designed by the creator of the historical centre of Helsinki, noted architect Carl Ludvig Engel. Keeping with an old tradition, the ground floor was reserved for business use, while the top floor was reserved for the owner's private apartment and representation.

Throughout the years, Gustaf Wilhelm Sundman rose into the ranks of the elite in Helsinki and had a strong part in developing the Port of Helsinki. After his death, the house belonged to the Sundman estate for a long time, and in 1861 it was transferred to his son, wealthy merchant Carl Wilhelm Ignatius Sundman. Later, the house belonged to Victor Ek and his estate for a long time and also served as the premises of the company Oy Victor Ek Ab. Restaurant activity started in the building after a renovation from 1988 to 1989. The renovation of the restaurant was designed by interior decoration architect Tuula Hagerström. According to her, she sought a "Finland-Swedish combination of mellowness and elegance", including elegance and correct behaviour connected to naturalness.

In 2001 G. W. Sundmans received a prestigious Michelin star but lost it in 2008. In 2013 the restaurant still received a Rising Star honorary mention in the Michelin guide. The restaurant also received the title of Restaurant of the Year from the Finnish Gastronomic Society in 2001.

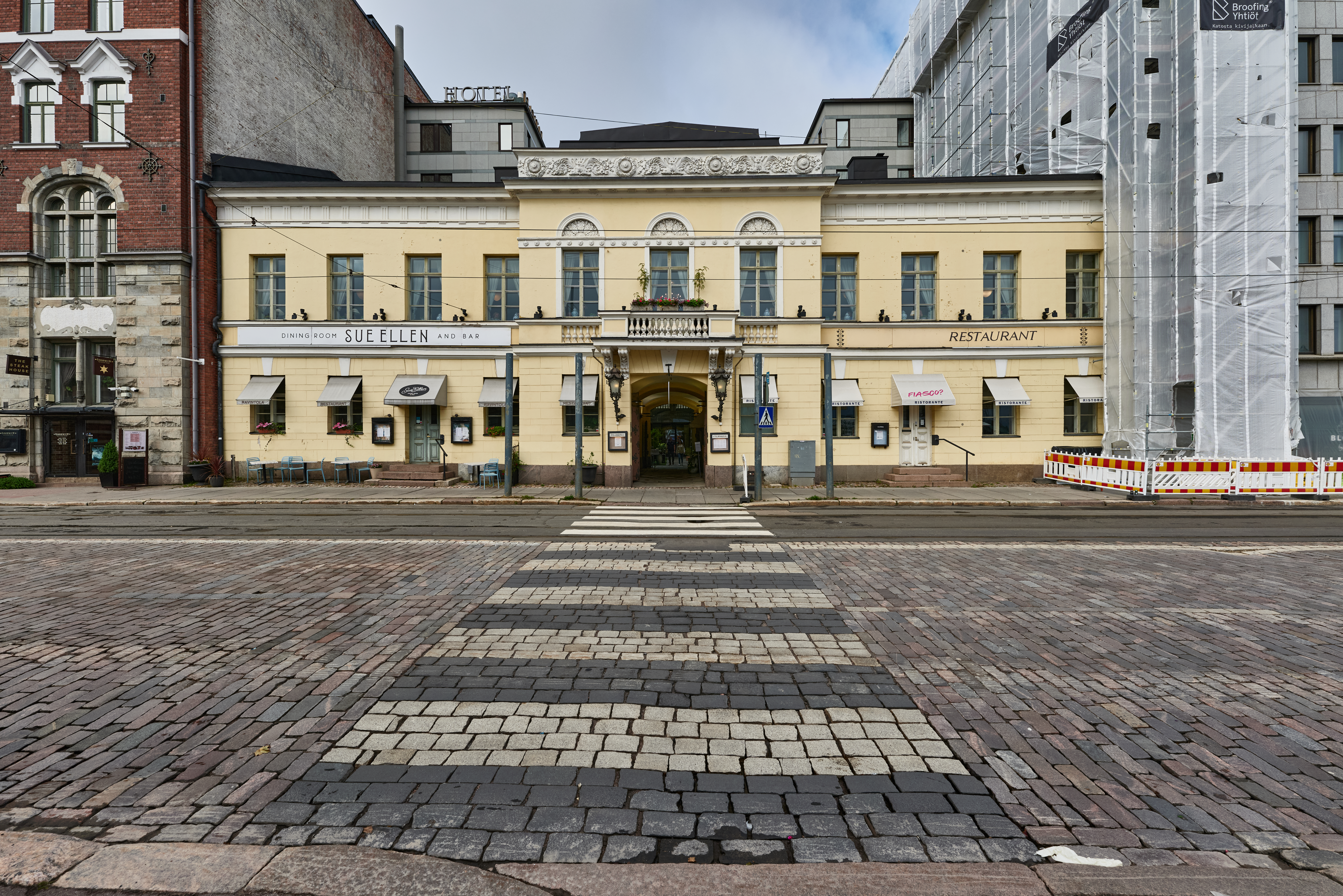
Restaurant Sue Ellen, 2022.

The restaurant was operated by Royal Ravintolat, who changed the restaurant into a catering restaurant in early 2015 and closed it down entirely at the end of the same year. The building now houses a new, unrelated restaurant, called Sue Ellen.
