= Optimus (ship) =

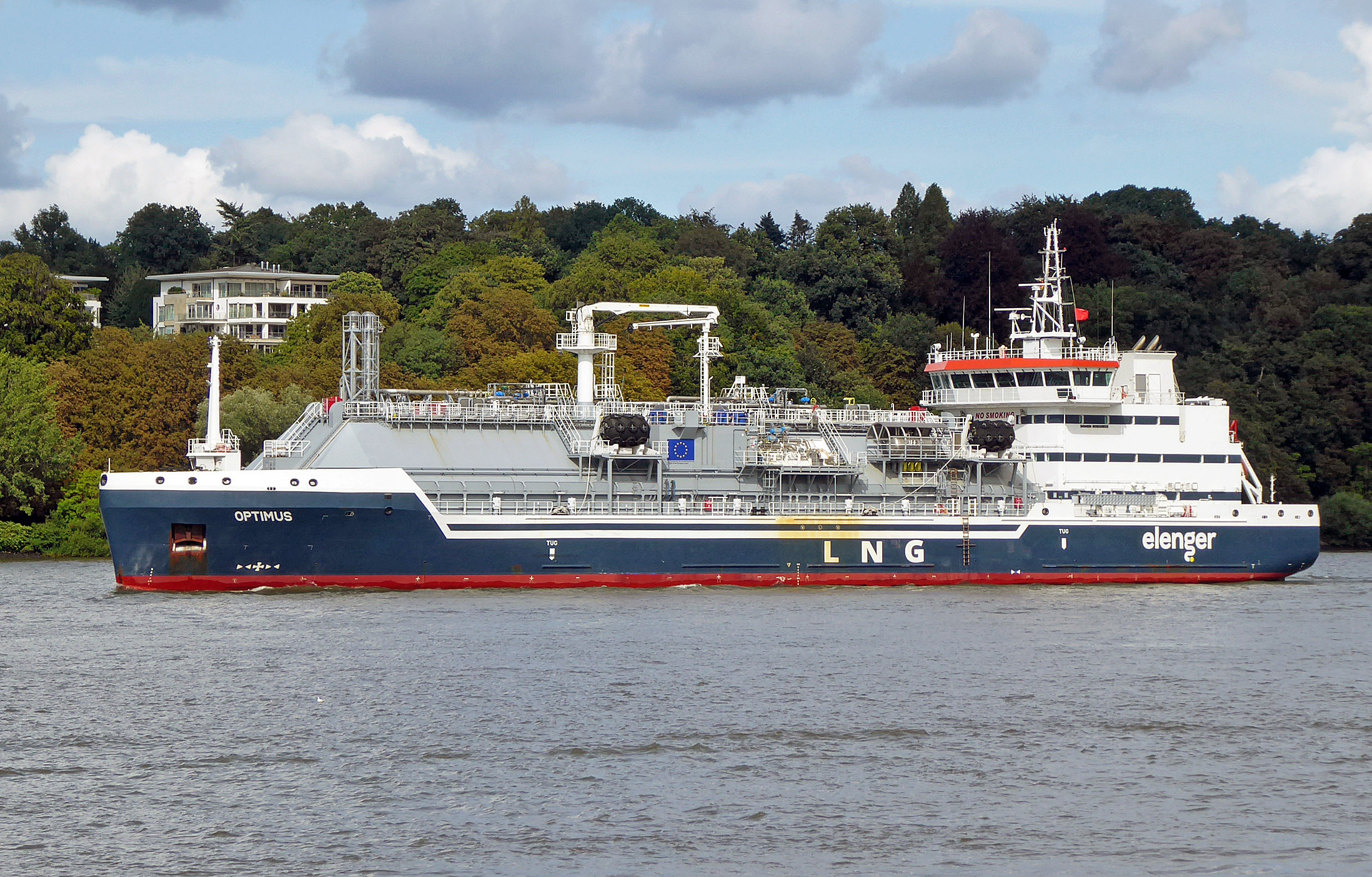

History
- Name: Optimus
- Owner: Eesti Gaas
- Port of registry: Latvia
- Builder: Damen Shipyard
- Laid down: 17 May 2019
- Launched: 8 September 2020
- Christened: 3 November 2021
- Completed: 2021
- In service: 19 March 2021
- Identification: Call sign: YLRT; IMO number: 9870472; MMSI no: 275525000
- Fate: In service

General characteristics
- Tonnage: 6,357 GT
- Length: 99.8 m (327 ft 5 in)
- Beam: 18.6 m (61 ft 0 in)
- Draught: 5.0 m (16 ft 5 in)
- Depth: 9.4 m (30 ft 10 in)
- Ice class: 1A
- Installed power: 2 × 1480 kW
- Speed: 13.4 knots
- Capacity: 6,000 m^{3} (210,000 cu ft) storage (LNG)
- Crew: 16

Optimus is a LNG bunkering ship which is owned by Eesti Gaas. The LNG vessel is operated by Eesti Gaas group business unit Elenger Marine. Optimus is the first LNG bunkering ship in the Baltic Sea.

The ship was ordered by Elenger for bunkering services for Tallink newbuild LNG fueled ships Megastar and MyStar. The first bunkering for Optimus was on November 5, 2021, when it was bunkering Tallink Megastar.
