= Translandia =

Emirati freight/passenger ferry

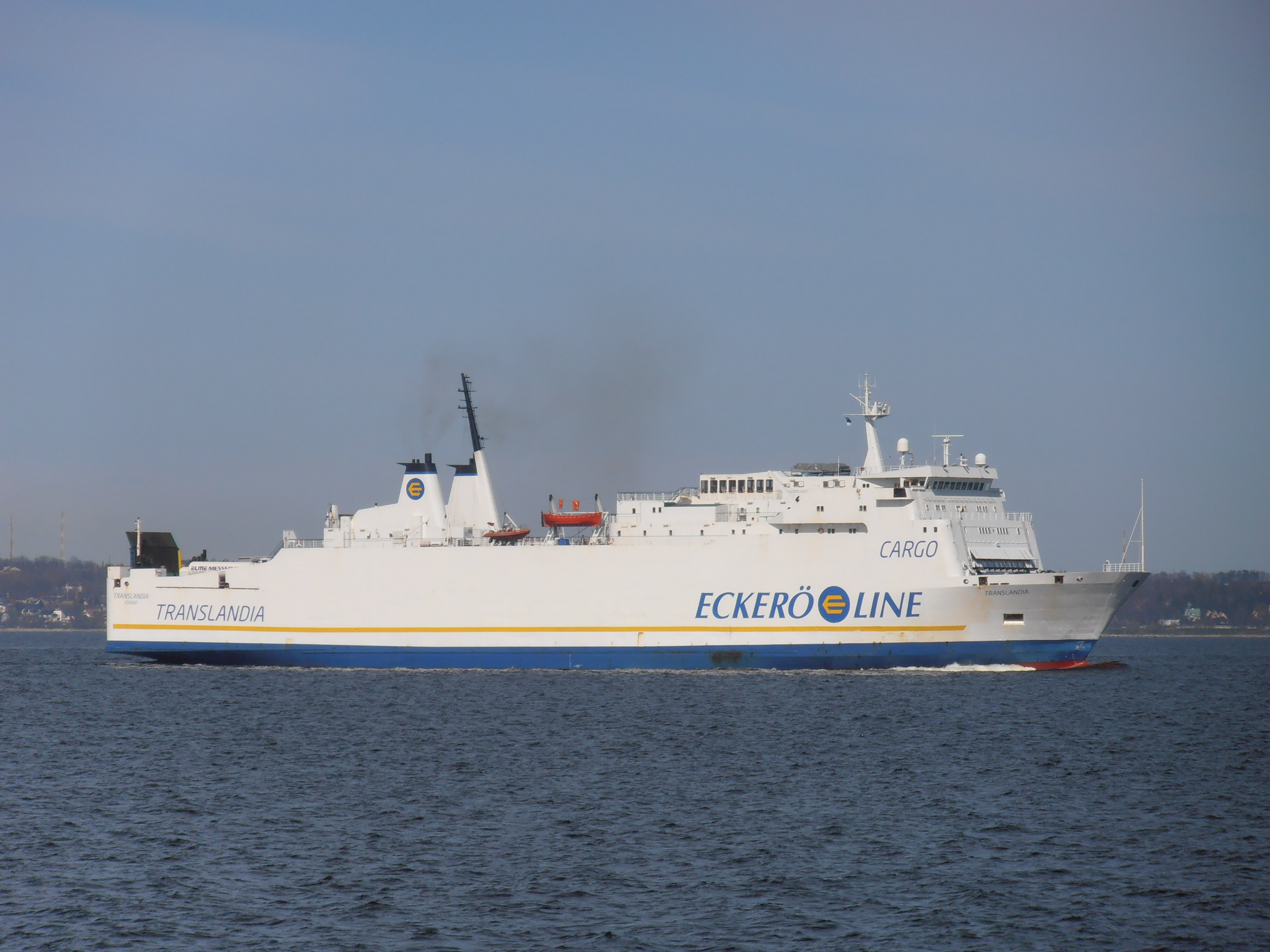
- M/S Translandia

History
- Name: 1976–1993: Transgermania; 1993–1995: Rosebay; 1995–1997: Eurostar; 1997–1998: Eurocruiser; 1998–2001: Rosebay; 2001–2004: Transparaden; 2004–2014: Translandia
- Owner: 2004–2013: Eckerö Line; 2013–2014: Salem Al Makrani Cargo Co
- Operator: 1995-1997: Sally Line; 2004–2013: Eckerö Line; 2013 onwards: Salem Al Makrani Cargo Co
- Port of registry: 2004–2013: Eckerö, Finland; 2013–2014: Moroni, Comoros
- Route: 2004–2012: Helsinki–Tallinn
- Builder: J. J. Sietas Werft, Hamburg, West Germany
- Yard number: 792
- Launched: 27 August 1976
- Christened: 1976
- Completed: 1 January 1976
- Acquired: 30 October 1976
- Maiden voyage: 4 November 1976
- Out of service: 2014
- Identification: Call sign: D6HL1; IMO number: 7429229; MMSI number: 616999287
- Fate: Scrapped at Alang, India in 2014

General characteristics
- Type: Ferry
- Tonnage: 13,867 GRT
- Length: 135.75 m (445 ft 4 in)
- Beam: 21.7 m (71 ft 2 in)
- Draught: 5.7 m (18 ft 8 in)
- Ice class: 1 A
- Installed power: 2 × MAN 6-52/55A diesels; 9,318 kW (12,496 hp) combined
- Propulsion: Twin screw, controllable pitch propellers
- Speed: 17 knots (31 km/h; 20 mph)
- Capacity: 63 passengers; 63 passenger beds; vehicles (1,624 lane meters)

Translandia was a freight/passenger ferry owned by the shipping company Salem Al Makrani Cargo from Dubai. She was built in 1976 by J. J. Sietas Werft, Hamburg, West Germany for Poseidon Schiffahrts oHG as the Transgermania. Between 2004 and 2012 she sailed for Finnish shipping company Eckerö Line on their route connecting Helsinki, Finland, to Tallinn, Estonia.

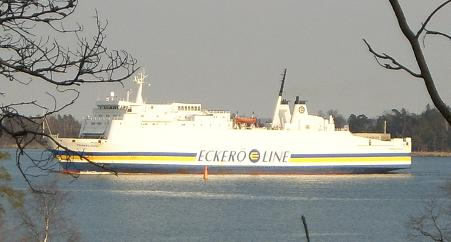
Translandia in April 2007
