= Vuosaari Harbour =

Seaport facility in Helsinki, Finland

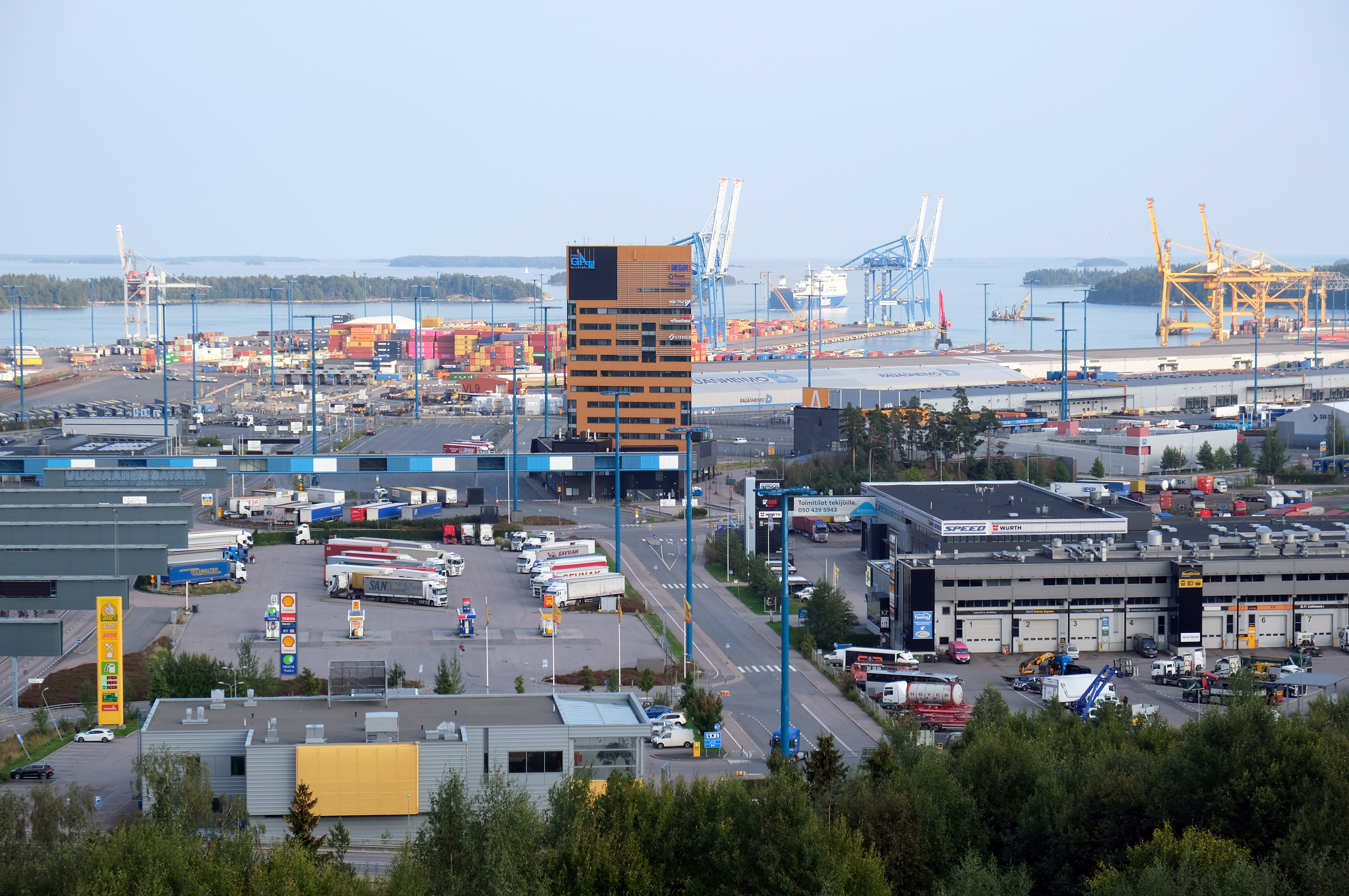
- View of the entrance of the port from a nearby hill
- Interactive map of Vuosaari Harbour
- Native name: Vuosaaren satama (Finnish); Nordsjö hamn (Swedish)

Location
- Country: Finland
- Location: Helsinki
- Coordinates: 60°13′N 25°11′E
- UN/LOCODE: FI VSS

Details
- Opened: 24 November 2008; 17 years ago
- Operated by: Port of Helsinki
- Owned by: Port of Helsinki
- Land area: 240 hectares (0.93 sq mi)

Statistics
- Vessel arrivals: 1,912 (2024)
- Annual container volume: 443,000 (2024)
- Value of cargo: c. €48 billion
- Passenger traffic: 371,000 (2024)
- Website www.portofhelsinki.fi/en/cargo-traffic-and-ships/vuosaari-harbour

Vuosaari Harbour (Vuosaaren satama in Finnish; Nordsjö hamn in Swedish) is a seaport facility in Helsinki, Finland, opened in 2008. A part of the Port of Helsinki system, it is Finland's leading cargo port by value of goods, and approximately half of Finland's cargo tonnage passes through the port. Operations at the port focus on container, roll-on-roll-off, and break bulk cargo, but a small amount of passenger traffic also takes place.

The port, which is in the suburb of Vuosaari in East Helsinki, was built on the site of the former Vuosaari shipyard between 2003 and 2008 in order to move most cargo traffic away from the ports of Helsinki's city center, which were at capacity, impractical to expand, and difficult for trucks to travel to. The port sits at the eastern end of Ring III (and thus has easy road access to the entire Greater Helsinki region), about 18 km east of the city center. The port also has a dedicated rail line that connects to the Finnish Main Line at Kerava, freeing the busiest parts of the line closest to Helsinki entirely for passenger traffic.

The centralization of cargo traffic to the outskirts of the city enabled the closing and redevelopment of Sörnäinen Harbour, the West Harbour container terminal and the Laajasalo oil harbour into the new mainly-residential areas of Kalasatama, Jätkäsaari and Kruunuvuorenranta. The closing of city center cargo ports also enabled the closing of a railway running along the city's waterfront and a large classification yard in Pasila, which have also been redeveloped. Passenger services and some ro-ro cargo traffic remain in the city center, at the Katajanokka Terminal, Olympia Terminal and the West Harbour.

== Passenger ships serving the terminal ==
Company	Ship	Route
(Finland) Finnlines	MS Finnlady	Helsinki – Travemünde
(Finland) Finnlines	MS Finnmaid	Helsinki – Travemünde
(Finland) Finnlines	MS Finnstar	Helsinki – Travemünde
(Finland) Eckerö Line	MS Finbo Cargo	Vuosaari – Muuga

== Gallery ==
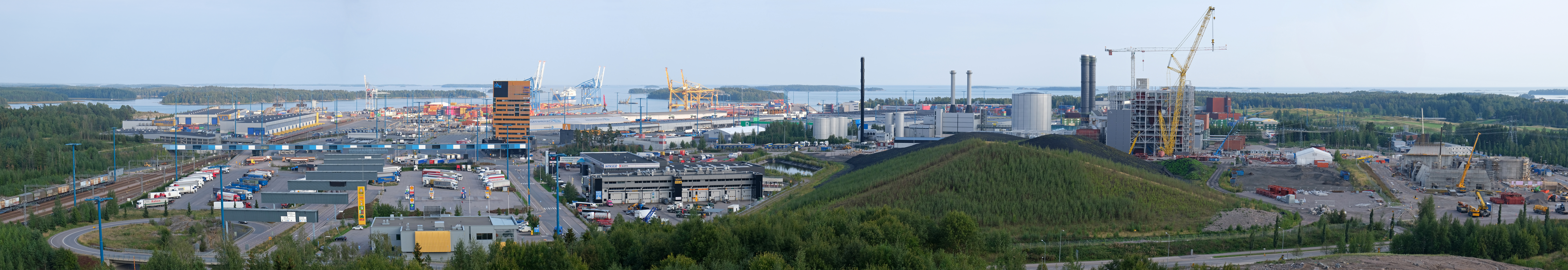
Vuosaari Harbour in 2021, seen from the nearby Vuosaarenhuippu hill
