= Port of Naantali =

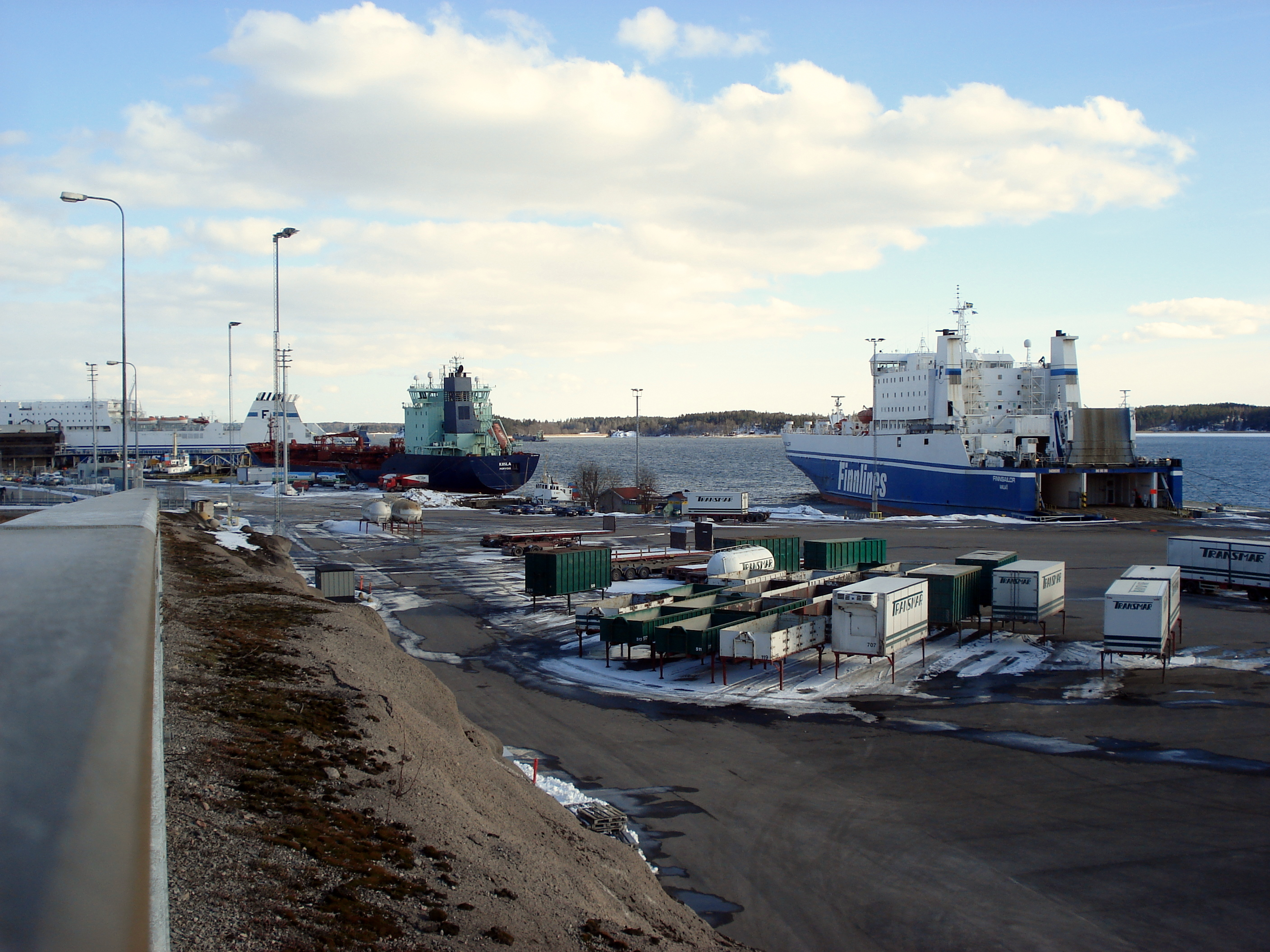
- Ships at port of Naantali

Location
- Country: Finland
- Location: Naantali
- Coordinates: 60°27′26″N 022°02′52″E
- UN/LOCODE: FI NLI

Statistics
- Vessel arrivals: 1580 (2018)
- Annual cargo tonnage: 7.8 million (2018)
- Website portofnaantali.fi

Aerial views of the Port of Naantali.

The Port of Naantali (Finnish: Naantalin satama, Swedish: Nådendal hamn) is a port located in the south-west of Finland, city of Naantali, where the mainland meets the beginning of the Turku archipelago. The port is the second largest in Finland in terms of passenger and cargo volume. The Port of Naantali's main volumes deriving from the liquid and dry bulk materials and ferry goods.

The port consists of three parts: Main Harbour (Finnish: Kantasatama), Luonnonmaa Harbour (which is located next to the Turku Repair Yard) and the Oil Harbour for Neste's Naantali refinery; all of which are managed by the Port of Naantali. At present, the port has both freight and passenger traffic and the connection from Naantali to Kapellskär in Sweden is operated by Finnlines.

The main entrance channel Naantalin väylä is 120 kilometres long and starts southern of Utö. Since 2009 it is cleared for vessels with drafts up to 15.3 m (50 ft), after it got extended from 13 metres which had been in effect since 1986.

== Ships serving the terminal ==
Company	Ship	Route	Notes
(Finland) Finnlines	MS Finncanopus	Naantali – Långnäs – Kapellskär	
(Finland) Finnlines	MS Finnsirius	Naantali – Långnäs – Kapellskär	
(Åland) Rederi Ab Fjärdvägen	MS Fjardvagen	Naantali – Långnäs	
