= Finbo Cargo =

Ferry built in 2000

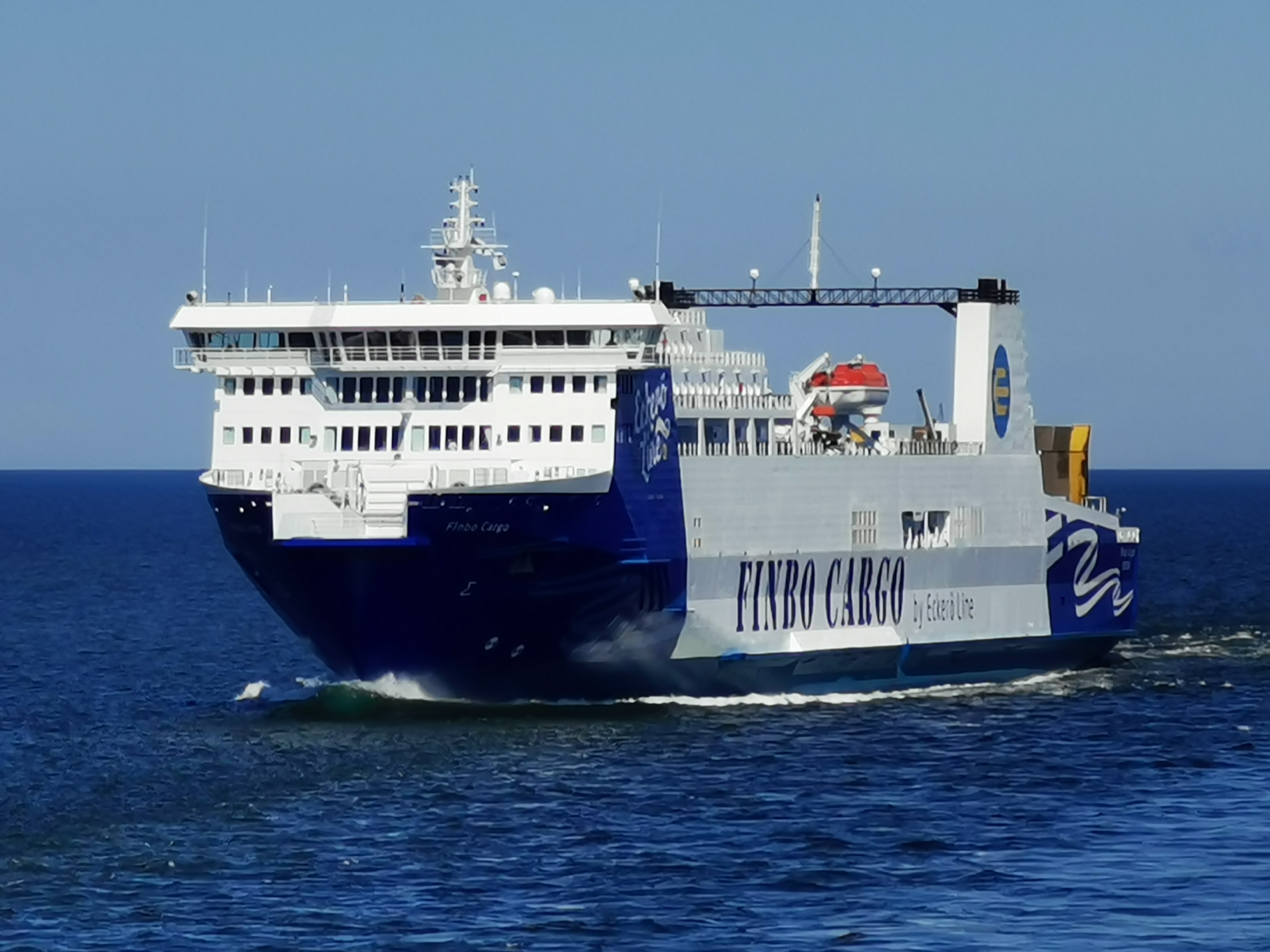
- Finbo Cargo en route to the Port of Tallinn on 18 July 2020.

History
- Name: Finbo Cargo (May 2019–present); European Endeavour (2007–May 2019); El Greco (2006–2007); Midnight Merchant (2000-2006)
- Owner: Finland Eckerö Line, (May 2019–Present); P&O Ferries (2007–May 2019); Acciona Transmediterranea (2006–2007); Cenargo International (2000–2006)
- Operator: Finland Eckerö Line, (May 2019–present); P&O Ferries (2010–May 2019); DFDS Seaways (2010); P&O Ferries (2009–2010); P&O Irish Sea (2007–2009); Acciona Transmediterranea (2006–2007); Norfolkline (2000–2006)
- Port of registry: 2000–2006: Nassau, (The Bahamas); 2006–2007: Santa Cruz De Tenerife, (Spain); 2007–2011: London, (United Kingdom); 2011–2019: Nassau, (The Bahamas); 2019 onwards: Eckerö, (Finland)
- Route: Dover—Dunkirk (2000-2006); Liverpool&—Dublin (2007 – May 2019); Vuosaari—Muuga (May 2019 – present)
- Builder: Fateema Machmouchi, Astilleros Españoles, Seville, Spain.
- Cost: $65 million USD
- Yard number: 290
- Laid down: 30 September 1998
- Launched: 26 November 1999
- Completed: 2000
- Maiden voyage: 5 October 2000 - (Dover-Dunkerque)
- In service: 5 October 2000
- Identification: Callsign: OJST; IMO number: 9181106; MMSI number: 230685000
- Status: In service

General characteristics
- Tonnage: 22,152 GT
- Length: 179.95 m (590 ft 5 in)
- Beam: 25.24 m (82 ft 10 in)
- Draught: 6.5 m (21 ft 4 in)
- Installed power: 4 × Wärtsilä 9L38 diesel engines producing 5,940 kW (7,970 hp) each at 600 rpm.; 2 × Wärtsilä 6L20 diesel engines producing 930 kW (1,250 hp) each at 900 rpm
- Propulsion: 2 × 4.85 m (15.9 ft) Wärtsilä Wichman propellers turning at 138 rpm; 2 x Brunvoll 1,300 kW (1,700 hp) bow thrusters
- Speed: 22.5 knots (41.7 km/h; 25.9 mph)
- Capacity: 366 from May 2019; 300 passengers; 120 freight vehicles.
- Crew: 47

Finbo Cargo is a roll-on/roll-off passenger ferry that was previously called European Endeavour which was owned and operated by P&O Ferries until May 2019. Eckerö Line purchased the ship from P&O in 2019 and is expected to take delivery in June 2019 and renamed her Finbo Cargo.

P&O took delivery of the ship in October 2007 from Acciona Trasmediterránea. She was the second P&O ship to have carried the name European Endeavour.

== History ==
The ship was built in 2000 for Merchant Ferries as Midnight Merchant for a planned service between Liverpool and Belfast, however, the ship was chartered to Norfolkline for their new service between Dover and Dunkirk and remained on that route until July 2006 when she was replaced by Maersk Dover, a newbuild.

In August 2006, she was chartered to Acciona Trasmediterránea for service in the Mediterranean and renamed El Greco registered under the Spanish flag.

On 26 June 2007, it was announced that P&O Ferries had agreed to purchase the ship in order to meet the growing demand for space from haulage customers throughout its operations. The ship will primarily be used on the Dover–Calais route but also on P&O Ferries Irish Sea and North Sea routes to cover for the refit of other vessels. The ship entered service with P&O on its Liverpool-Dublin route on 6 November 2007.

The ship has been involved in two incidents. On 22 March 2008, the ships mooring ropes parted resulting is her drifting across the eastern entrance of Dover Harbour. The ship was assisted back to her berth by a Dover Harbour tug. On 29 August 2008, the ship suffered a partial loss of electrical power, which resulted in a collision with Linkspan 7 in Calais. European Endeavour's 'cow catcher', a metal structure welded to the bow to support the bow ramp when deployed, was demolished and significant damage was caused to the linkspan.

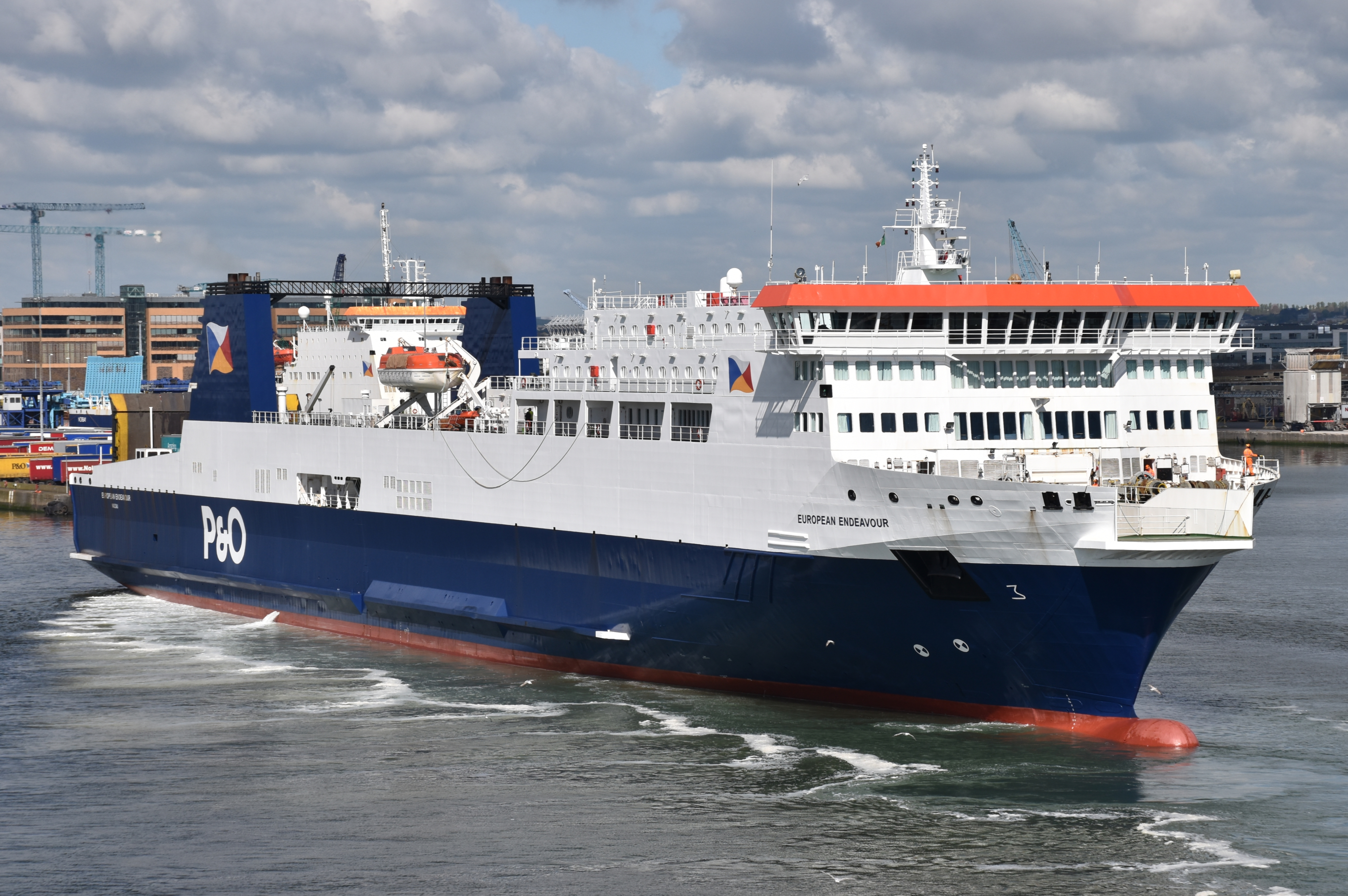
As European Endeavour in 2018

Due to a downturn in freight traffic P&O Ferries laid up the ship in Tilbury in May 2010. She was chartered to DFDS Seaways in August 2010 and early September 2010 to provide refit cover on the Birkenhead–Dublin and Belfast routes. On completion of this charter the ship was sent for its annual overhaul and then proceeded to Dunkirk for layup. She remained in Dunkirk until early February 2011, when she sailed for Liverpool in preparation for returning to service on the Liverpool-Dublin service replacing the M/V Norcape.

In May 2019, P&O sold European Endeavour to Eckerö Line. She was to act as a complement to Eckerö's Finlandia on the Helsinki to Tallinn route commencing in June berthing at Vuosaari Harbour on the outskirts of Helsinki. She joined the service following another dry docking with an increased capacity of 366 passengers. She only left the dry dock at Cammell Laird on 2 May 2019.

== Regular routes ==
- Dover–Dunkirk October 2000 - July 2006.
- Barcelona - Palma de Mallorca August - October 2006.
- Barcelona/Valencia-Palma de Mallorca/Ibiza/Mahón October 2006 - September 2007.
- Dover-Calais 11 January 2008 - May 2010.
- Liverpool - Dublin From February 2011 to May 2019.
- Helsinki - Tallinn from June 2019

It was P&O's intention that the ship would primarily be used between Dover and Calais but would also cover the refits of other ships on the following routes:-

- Hull-Rotterdam
- Hull-Zeebrugge
- Liverpool-Dublin 6 November 2007 – 16 December 2007
- Tilbury - Zeebrugge January 2009.

It was discovered that the ship was too wide to fit through the lock at Hull so she did not serve the routes from that port as intended. She was briefly used on a re-established Dover-Zeebrugge route but the service only lasted for one day due to lack of freight.

== Sister ships ==
- MS Kaiarahi (IMO 9147291, ex Stena Alegra, Norman Trader, T Rex, Ave Lübeck, Pau Casals, Europax Appia, Dawn Merchant)
- Aquaris Brasil (IMO 9147306, ex Norman Bridge, Ave Liepaja, Brave Merchant) modified into ad offshore support vessel)
- MS Isle of Inisheer (IMO 9181091 ex Ciudad de Mahon, Zurbaran, Northern Merchant)
- MV Cracovia (IMO 9237242, ex Drujiba, Murillo)
