= Eckerö Line =

Finnish shipping company

Eckerö Line Ab Oy
- Formerly: Eestin Linjat
- Type: Osakeyhtiö
- Industry: Shipping
- Founded: 1995
- Headquarters: Helsinki, Finland
- Area served: Baltic Sea
- Key people: Taru Keronen (President and CEO)
- Services: Passenger transportation Freight transportation
- Parent: Rederiaktiebolaget Eckerö
- Website: www.eckeroline

Eckerö Line is a Finnish shipping company owned Rederiaktiebolaget Eckerö. Eckerö Line operates two ferries between Helsinki, Finland and Tallinn, Estonia.

== History ==
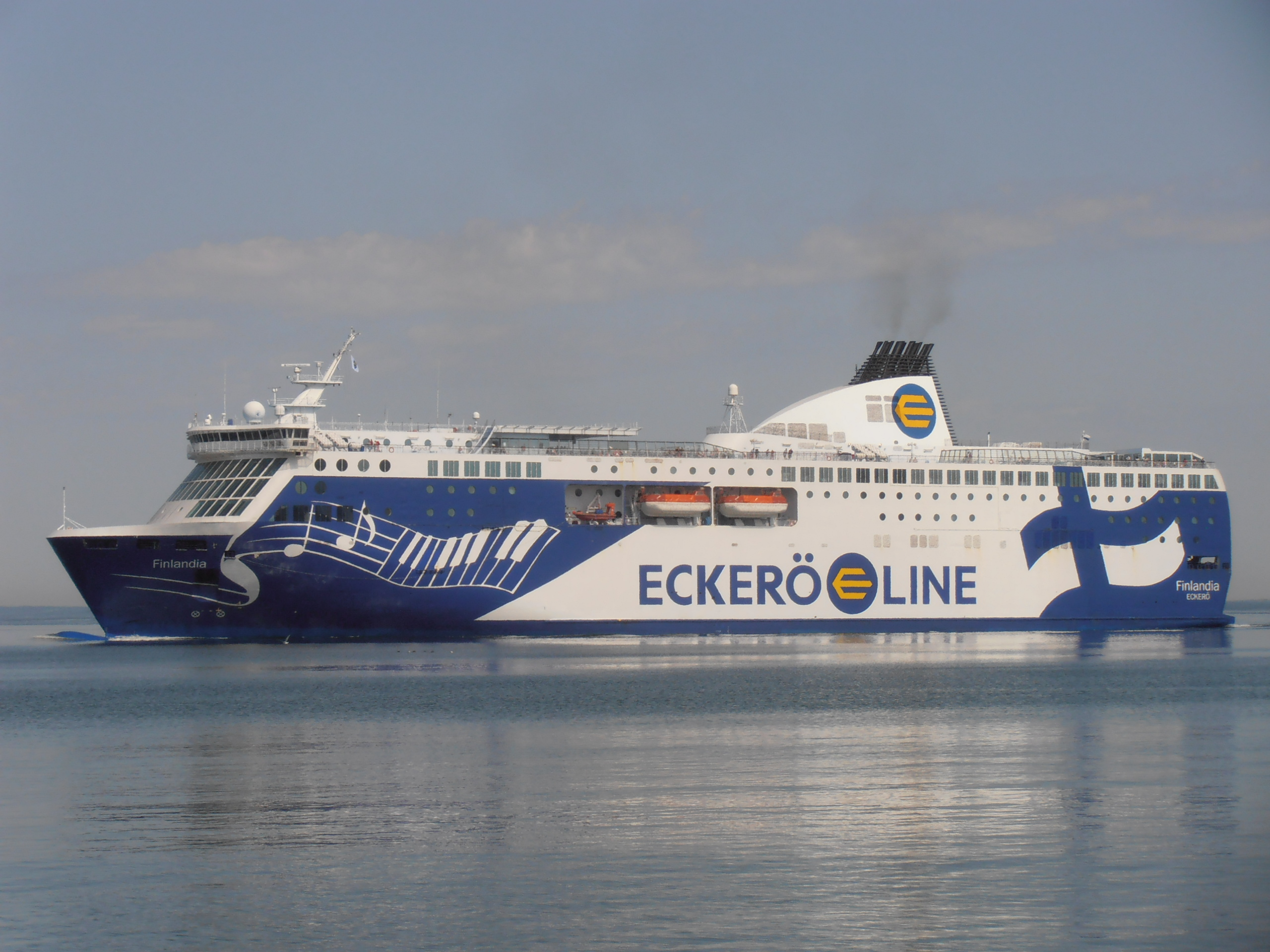
Finlandia

In 1992, Rederiaktiebolaget Eckerö and Birka Line founded Eestin Linjat to operate the Alandia on the fast-growing route between Helsinki and Tallinn. The name of the company was reportedly selected for practical reasons as it required the change of only a few letters to re-paint Eckerölinjen into Eestin Linjat (or vice versa). Similarly the livery of Eestin Linjat was very similar to that of Eckerö Linjen. However, due to the use of the word Eesti (Estonian for "Estonia") instead of the Finnish word Viro, the Finnish public presumed the new company was an Estonian one. This was made worse after the Estonia disaster in 1994 when many people in Finland began associating Eestin Linjat with EstLine, owners of the ill-fated Estonia. As a result of this Eestin Linjat changed its name into Eckerö Line in 1995 (with the livery of the ships made identical to those of Eckerö Linjen). At the same time a second ship, Apollo (a sister ship of the Alandia and Eckerö Linjen's Roslagen) was added to the route.

In 1998 Eckerö Line acquired its first cruiseferry, Nordlandia which replaced both of the previous ships sailing on the route. The Nordlandia also brought with it a slight change in livery as the typeface used in the ship's hull was changed from a heavy serif into a light, italicized sans-serif. In May 2004 Eckerö Line purchased the freight/passenger ferry Translandia as a second ship for the Helsinki–Tallinn route in response to the high demand for freight capacity after Estonia joined the European Union.

In May 2019 it was announced that P&O had sold the European Endeavour to Eckerö Line. She was renamed Finbo Cargo and is to act as a complement to Eckerö's current vessel the Finlandia on the Helsinki to Tallinn Route commencing in June berthing at Vuosaari on the outskirts of Helsinki. She will join the service following another dry docking with an increased capacity of 366 passengers.

== Fleet ==
=== Current fleet ===
Ship	Type	Built	Entered service	Gross tonnage	Passengers (max)	Vehicles	Knots	Route	Flag and home port	Image
Finlandia	Cruiseferry	2001	2012–	36,365 GT	2.080		27	Helsinki – Tallinn	(Åland) Eckerö, Finland	
Finbo Cargo	Ro-Ro	2000	2019–	22,152 GT	366		22,5	Vuosaari – Muuga	(Åland) Eckerö, Finland	

=== Former ships ===
Ships that are still in use are marked in green.

Ship	Built	In service	Current status
Apollo	1970	1995–1999	Scrapped in 2021
Translandia	1976	2004–2012	Scrapped in 2014
Nordlandia	1981	1998–2013	Renamed Almariya for Trasmediterránea in 2016
