= MS Megastar =

2016 ferry

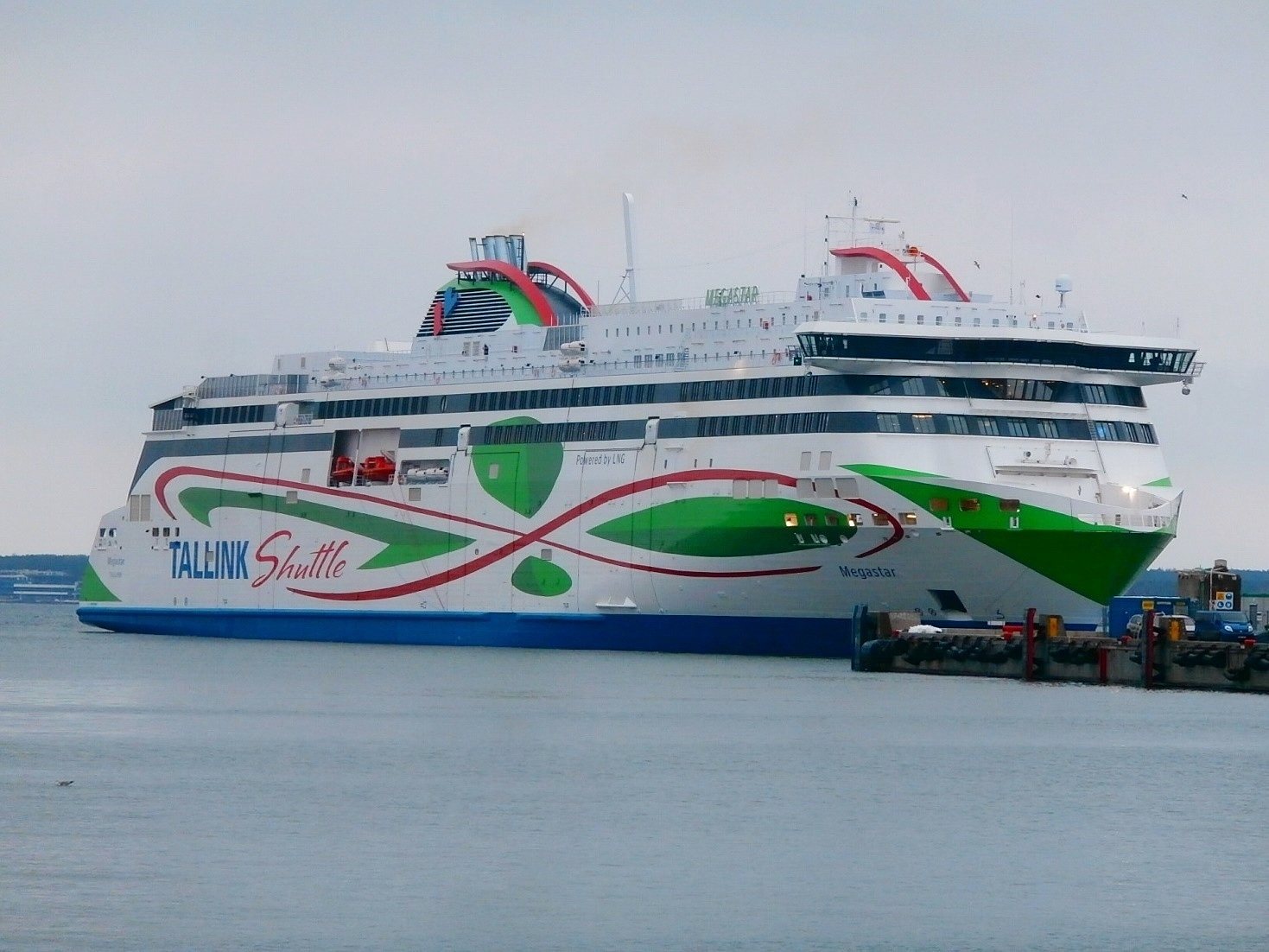
- Megastar

History

Estonia
- Name: Megastar
- Owner: Tallink
- Port of registry: Tallinn, Estonia
- Route: Tallinn–Helsinki
- Ordered: 27 February 2015
- Builder: Meyer Turku, Finland
- Cost: €230 million (2015)
- Yard number: 1391
- Laid down: 9 February 2016
- Launched: 15 July 2016
- Sponsored by: Tarja Halonen
- Christened: 1 July 2016
- Completed: 24 January 2017
- Maiden voyage: 29 January 2017
- Identification: Call sign: ESKL; IMO number: 9773064; MMSI number: 276829000

General characteristics
- Type: Ro-pax ferry
- Tonnage: 49,134 GT
- Length: 212 m (696 ft)
- Beam: 36 m (118 ft)
- Ice class: 1 A
- Installed power: 3 × Wärtsilä 12V50DF; 2 × Wärtsilä 6L50DF; combined 45,600 kW (61,200 hp)
- Propulsion: Diesel-electric; two shafts
- Speed: 27 knots (50 km/h; 31 mph)
- Capacity: 2,800 passengers

MS Megastar is a fast ro-ro/passenger (ro-pax) ferry built by the Meyer Turku shipyard in Turku, Finland, for the Estonian shipping company Tallink. Costing approximately €230 million, the vessel is the first ship in Tallink's fleet to operate on liquefied natural gas (LNG) as its primary fuel.

== Construction ==
Construction of Tallink's new car ferry began on 4 August 2015, with the keel laid on 9 February 2016. On 1 July 2016, the ship was officially named Megastar by former Finnish President Tarja Halonen. The name was selected from 21,550 public submissions received during a naming competition.

The vessel was floated out on 15 July 2016, with sea trials scheduled for late 2016. Megastar was delivered to Tallink on 24 January 2017.

== Service history ==
Following its delivery in January 2017, Megastar entered service on the Helsinki–Tallinn route. Along with MyStar and Finlandia, it is one of the main vessels operating on the route and is the fastest ferry currently in regular service between Helsinki and Tallinn.

== Technical details ==
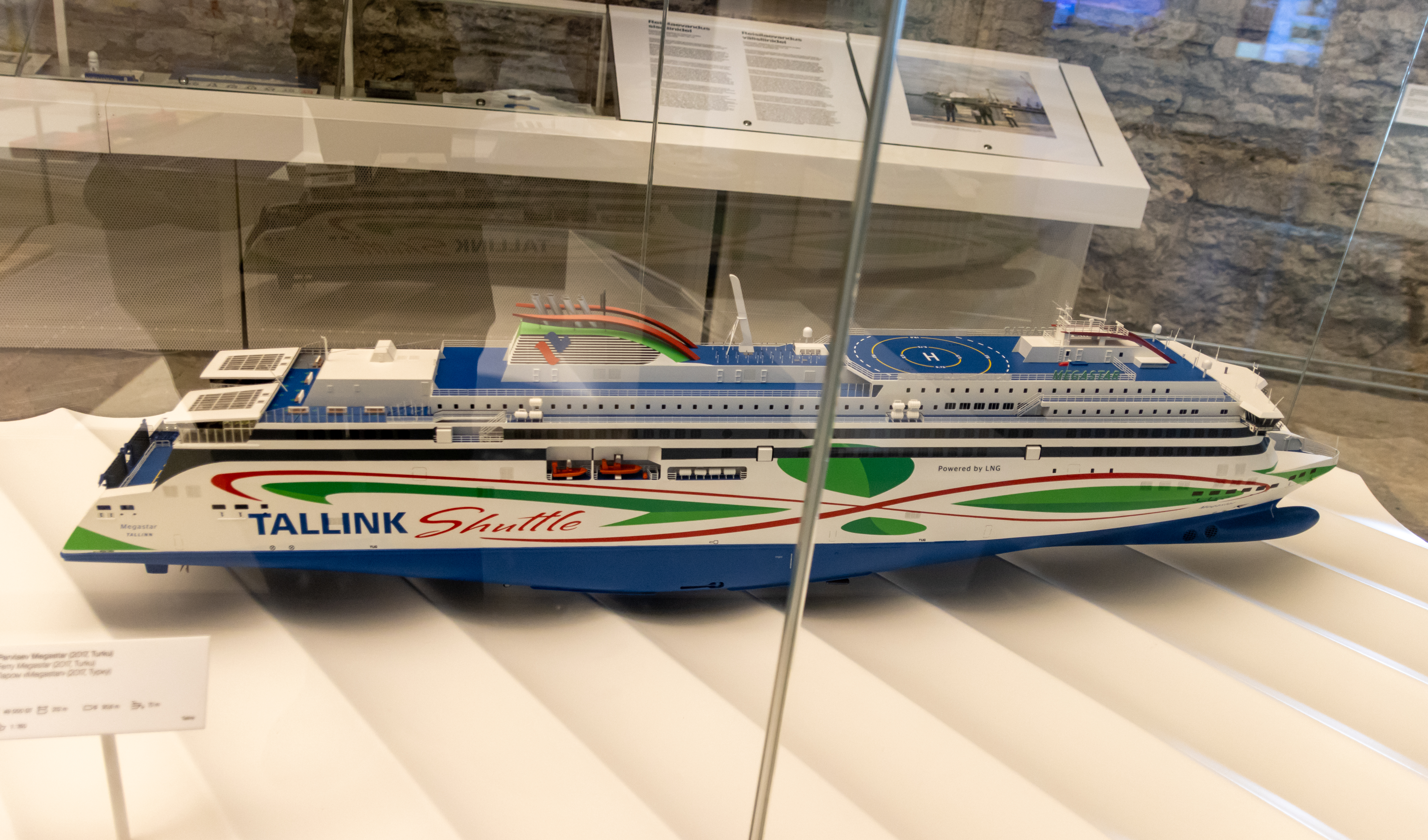
Model of the ship at Estonian Maritime Museum

Megastar is powered by three 12-cylinder Wärtsilä 12V50DF and two 6-cylinder Wärtsilä 6L50DF four-stroke dual-fuel generating sets. While capable of running on marine diesel oil (MDO), the engines will primarily use liquefied natural gas (LNG) as fuel. This reduces both sulphur oxide (SOx) and nitrogen oxide (NOx) emissions, and allows the vessel to comply with IMO Tier III emission limits as well as the additional restrictions of the Baltic Sea Sulphur Emission Control Area. The gas fuel is stored in two 300 m^{3} (11,000 cu ft) cryogenic storage tanks which, unlike in the previous LNG-fueled cruiseferry Viking Grace, are located inside the hull of the vessel, below the main deck. The propulsion system is diesel-electric, meaning that instead of being mechanically coupled to the twin propeller shafts, the main engines form a power plant which produces electricity for all electrical consumers ranging from propulsion motors to auxiliary systems and hotel functions. This allows starting and stopping engines depending on power demand and improves the fuel efficiency as the engines can run at their nominal power.

Megastar has a service speed of 27 knots (50 km/h; 31 mph).
