= Finlandia (2000) =

Cruiseferry built in 2001

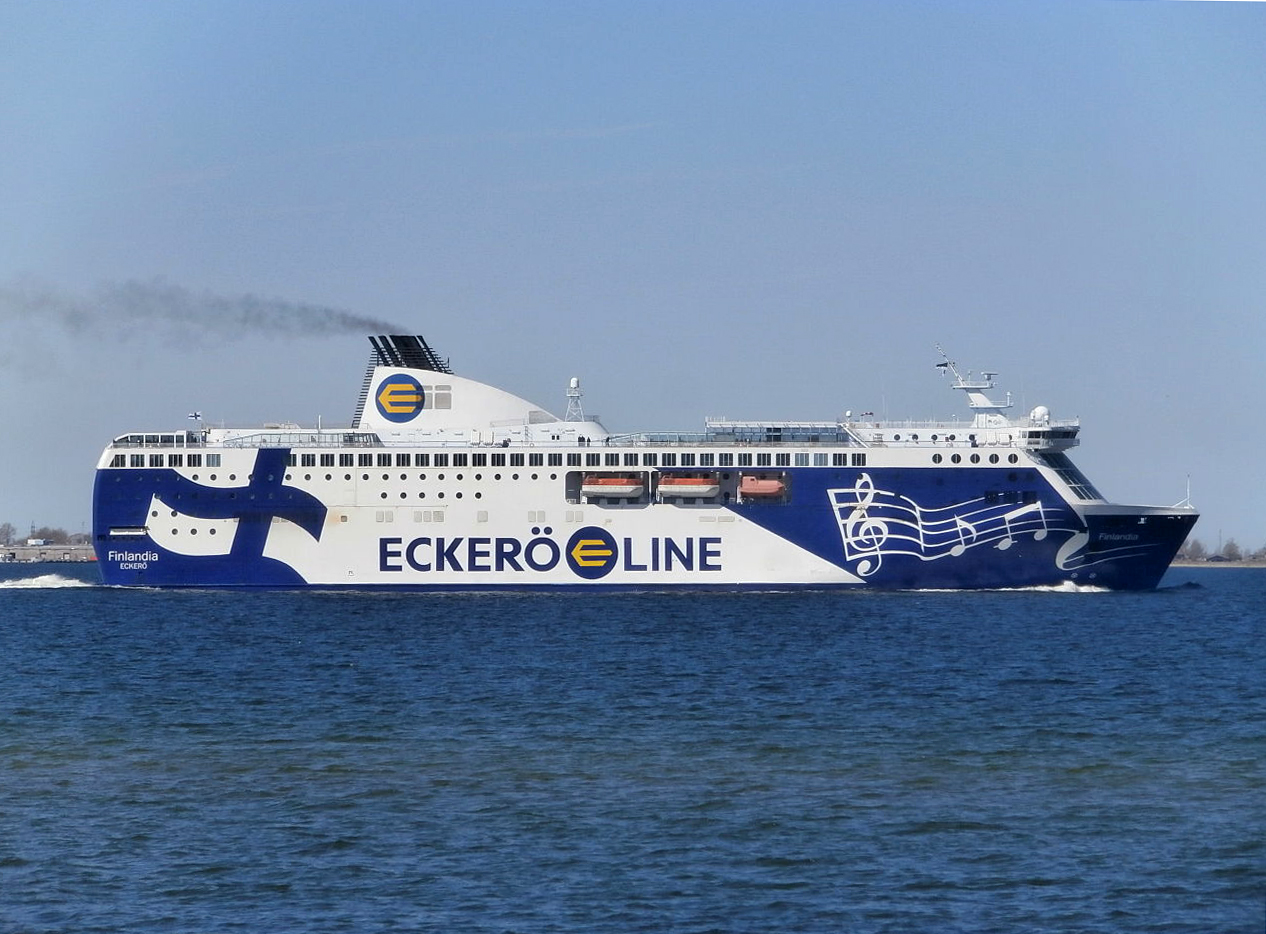
- Finlandia departing Tallinn on April 24, 2014.

History
- Name: 2001–12: Moby Freedom; 2012: Freedom; 2012 onwards: Finlandia
- Operator: 2001–12: Moby Lines; 2012 onwards: Eckerö Line
- Port of registry: 2001–12: Naples, Italy; 2012 onwards: Eckerö, Finland
- Route: Helsinki—Tallinn
- Builder: DSME, Seoul, South Korea
- Yard number: 7506
- Launched: 23 December 2000
- Home port: Eckerö
- Identification: Call sign: OJPP; IMO number: 9214379; MMSI number: 230628000

General characteristics
- Tonnage: 36,890 GT
- Length: 175 m (574 ft 2 in)
- Beam: 27.60 m (90 ft 7 in)
- Decks: 9
- Ice class: 1A
- Installed power: 4 × Wärtsilä 12V46 diesels
- Propulsion: 2 × Controllable pitch propellers
- Speed: 27 knots (50 km/h; 31 mph)
- Capacity: 2,080 passengers; 610 cars

MS Finlandia is a cruiseferry owned by Rederiaktiebolaget Eckerö and operated by the Finnish ferry operator Eckerö Line. The ship operates between Tallinn and Helsinki.

== History ==
She was launched in South Korea as Moby Freedom on 23. december 2000 and entered service 25. july 2001.

In 2012 Rederiaktiebolaget Eckerö bought and rebuilt her at Landskrona dockyard. This included, among other things, new propellers and ice-strengthening. Later she was renamed to Finlandia.

In 2019 during docking in Poland she received a new passenger door, shore power readiness and a ballast water treatment system.

During docking in 2026 she received a new seating area "Horizon seats", her buffet was renovated along with deck 8 flooring, Cafeteria Satama was expanded on deck 9 and preparations were made for new hybrid battery pack "Konttinen".

== Sister ships ==
The Finlandia is the second of three identical ships built by DSME and Fincantieri. The other two ships are Moby Wonder and Moby Aki. Tallink’s Superstar is also considered a sister ship, but the two ships are not identical.
