= MS Princesa Marissa =

Cruise ship built in 1966

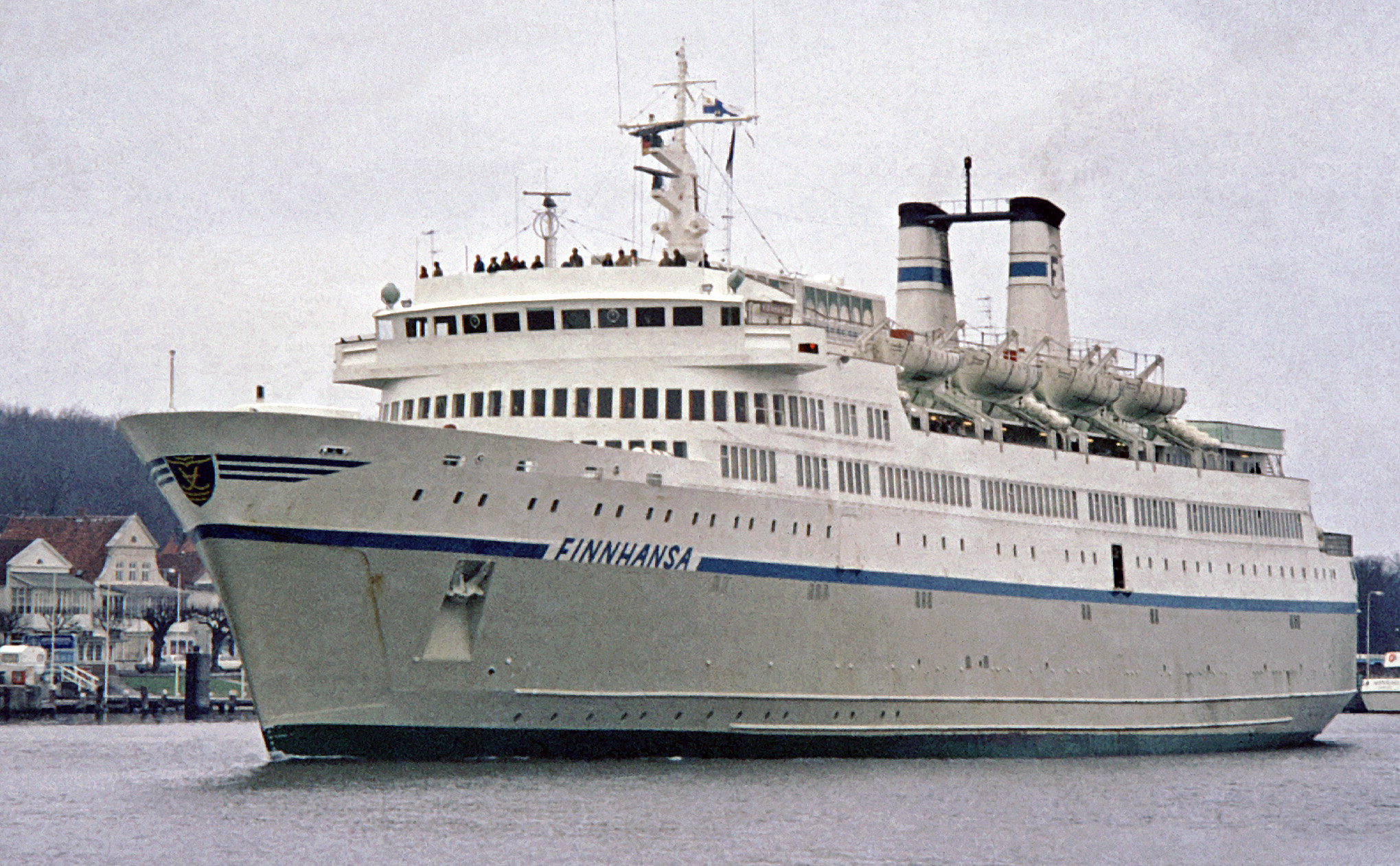
- Finnhansa in Travemünde, 1975

History
- Name: 1966-1977: Finnhansa; 1977-1987: Prisessan; 1987-2008: Princesa Marissa; 2008: Prince
- Owner: 1966-1977: Finnlines; 1977-1987: Birka Line; 1987-2008: Louis Cruise Lines
- Port of registry: 1966-1977: Helsinki, Finland; 1977-1987: Mariehamn, Finland; 1987-2008: Limassol, Cyprus; 2008–2008: Batumi, Georgia
- Ordered: November 1963
- Builder: Wärtsilä Helsinki Shipyard, Helsinki, Finland
- Yard number: 377
- Launched: December 1, 1964
- In service: 1966
- Out of service: 2008
- Identification: Call sign: 4LFF2; IMO number: 6509371
- Fate: Scrapped in 2008

General characteristics (as built)
- Tonnage: 7,481 GRT; 3,496 NRT; 2,510 DWT
- Length: 134.4 m (441 ft)
- Beam: 20.1 m (66 ft)
- Draft: 5.7 m (19 ft)
- Installed power: 2 × Wärtsilä-Sulzer 8RD56; 10,300 kW (combined)
- Propulsion: Two shafts
- Speed: 20 knots (37 km/h; 23 mph) (maximum)
- Capacity: 1,424 passengers; 350 berths; 308 cars

General characteristics (1972 refit)
- Tonnage: 9,491 GRT; 4,920 NRT; 2,002 DWT
- Capacity: 1,057 passengers; 875 berths; 95 cabins

General characteristics (1980 refit)
- Tonnage: 10,487 GT; 4,600 NT; 2,002 DWT
- Capacity: 853 passengers; 853 berths

MS Princesa Marissa was a cruise ship owned and operated by the Cyprus-based Louis Cruise Lines. She was built in 1966 by Wärtsilä Helsinki Shipyard, Helsinki, Finland as the RORO car/passenger ferry M/S Finnhansa for Finnlines, Finland. The ship also sailed under the colours of Birka Line as M/S Prinsessan.

== History ==
=== Finnlines service ===
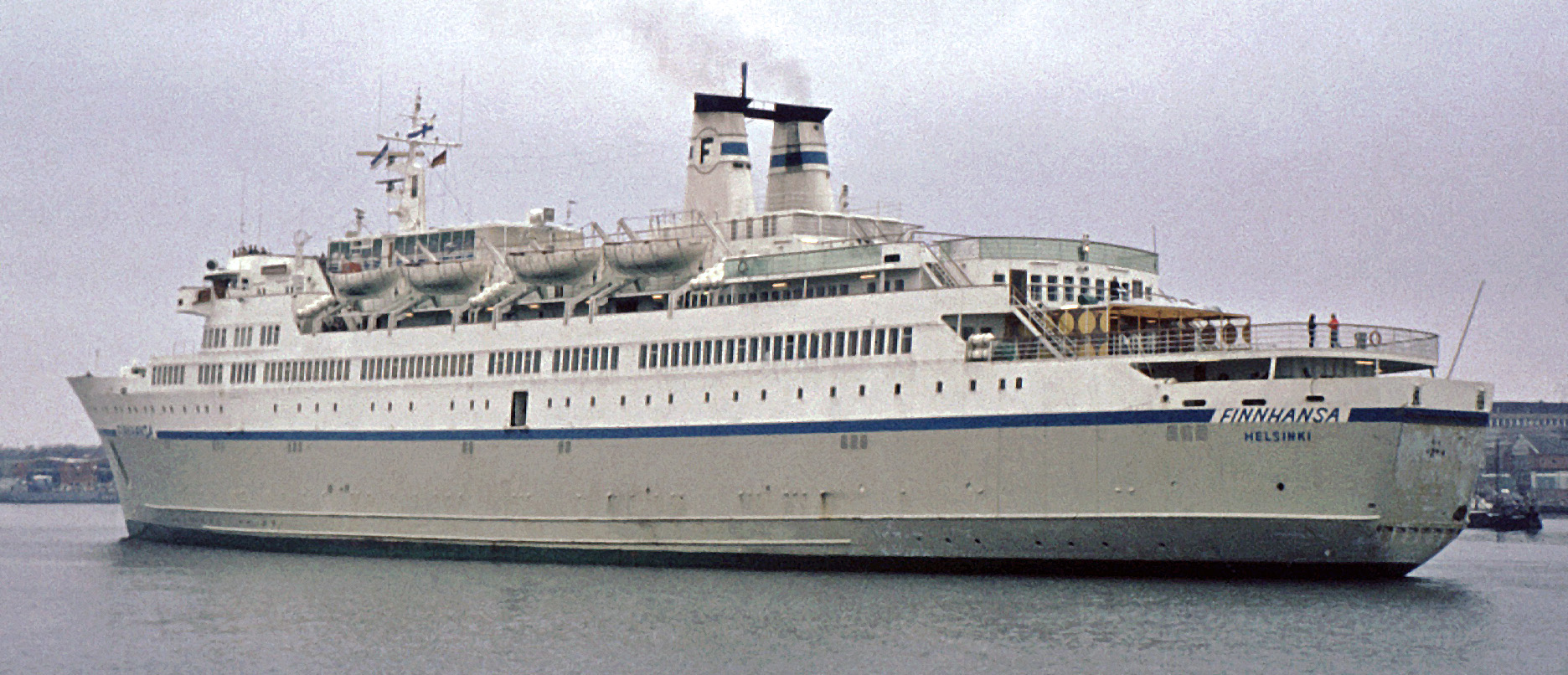
MS Finnhansa in Travemünde, 1975.

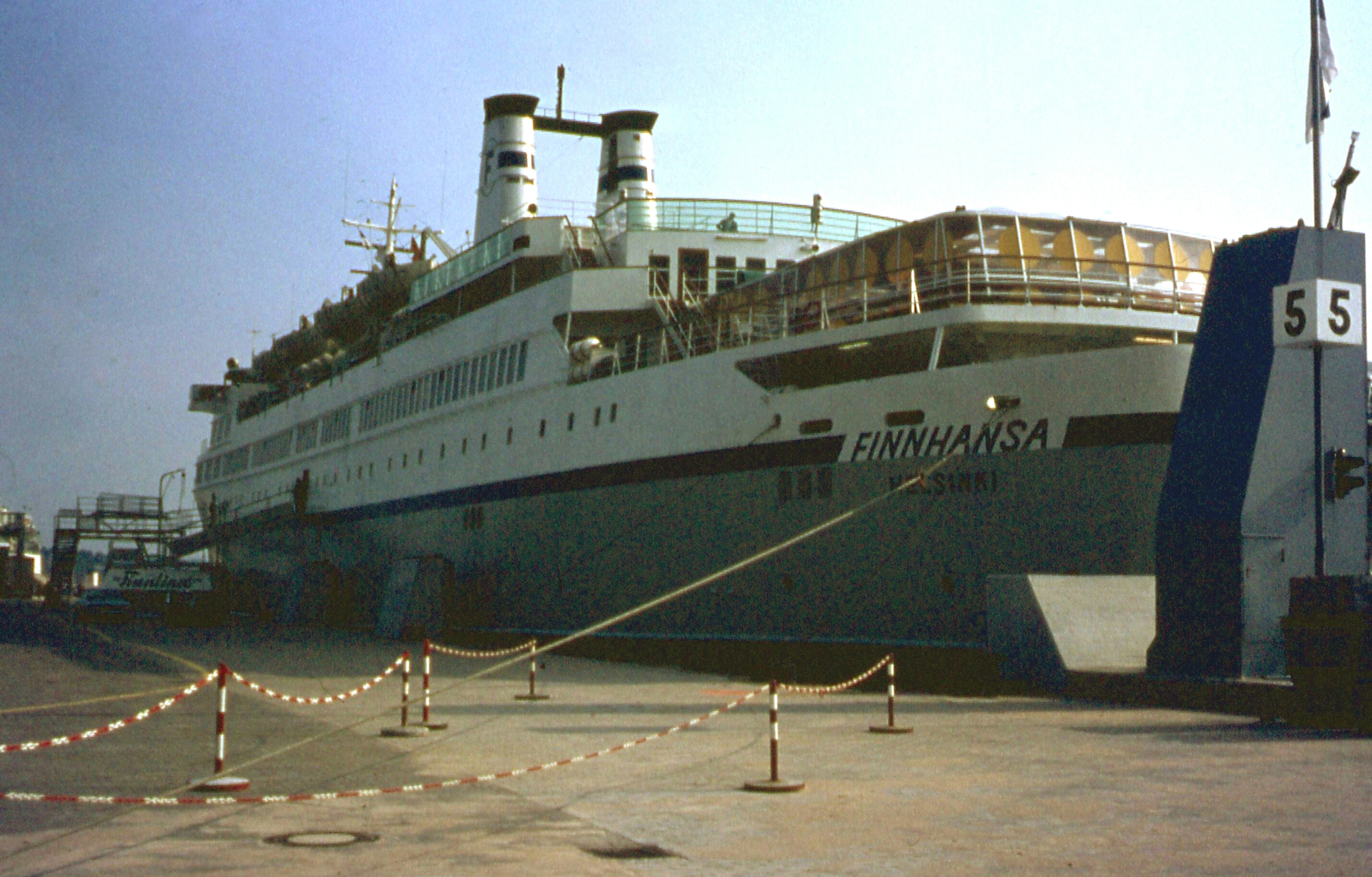
MS Finnhansa in Travemünde, June 1972.

Finnlines had begun car/passenger ferry operations from Finland to Germany in 1962 with M/S Hansa Express. The Hansa Express soon proved too small however, and already in November 1963 Finnlines ordered a pair of larger ferries to replace her. The first of these sisters, M/S Finnhansa, was launched on December 1, 1964, by Sylvi Kekkonen, the wife of Finnish president Urho Kekkonen. The ship was originally planned to be delivered in June 1965, but two fires on board during the fitting out phase, first one in March 1965 and the second in December of the same year, meant she wasn't delivered until March 28, 1966. Although she sailed under Finnlines' colours, the ship was actually owned by Merivienti Oy ("Sea exports Ltd."). At the time of her delivery, the Finnhansa was the largest ferry in the Baltic Sea. In June 1966 her sister M/S Finnpartner was delivered, but Finnhansa kept her title of "largest in the Baltic" as she was purposefully built 10 centimeters longer than her sister.

Originally the Finnhansa sailed on the route Helsinki (Finland) — Nynäshamn (Sweden) — Karlskrona (Sweden) — Lübeck (Germany) — Slite (Sweden) — Helsinki carrying up to 1424 passengers, but after a few years the route was simplified into Helsinki — Nynäshamn — Travemünde. During summer 1967 the ship made weekend cruises from Lübeck to Rønne (Denmark) and Helsinki to Sandhamn. In 1970 the Finnhansa, along with the entirety of Finnlines, was sold to the Finnish paper industry giant Enso-Gutzeit. In spring 1972 the ship was rebuilt at Howaldtswerke-Deutsche Werft, Kiel, Germany with 288 new cabin places. Additional rebuilding followed in spring 1973, when the ship's restaurant deck was rebuilt and the outside pool from her aft deck was removed.

In May 1977, following delivery of the new GTS Finnjet, the decision was made the withdraw the Finnhansa from service. However, she stayed in finnlines traffic for the time being, as a buyer wasn't found until September 1977 when she was sold to Birka Line, Finland, with the price of 50 million Swedish kronor, to be delivered in January 1978.

=== Birka Line service ===
On January 9, 1978, the ship was renamed M/S Prinsessan (the Birka Line ship to sail under the name), and on January 18 she began service on Birka Line's Stockholm — Mariehamn route. In 1980 the Prinsessan was rebuilt at Howaldtswerke-Deutsche Werft, Hamburg, Germany. New cabins were added in her car deck, her rear superstructure extended and new conference rooms added on top of her superstructure, somewhat compromising the ship's original sleek profile. On November 7, 1982, a small fire broke out on board while the ship was in Mariehamn, but it caused minimal damage and the ship left for Stockholm some two hours behind schedule.

In 1986 Birka Line took delivery of the new M/S Birka Princess, and in April of that year the Prinsessan was put up for sale and laid up in Mariehamn. She remained there for a year, until in April 1987 she was sold to Louis Cruise Lines, Cyprus for 3 million US dollars.

=== Louis Cruise Lines service ===
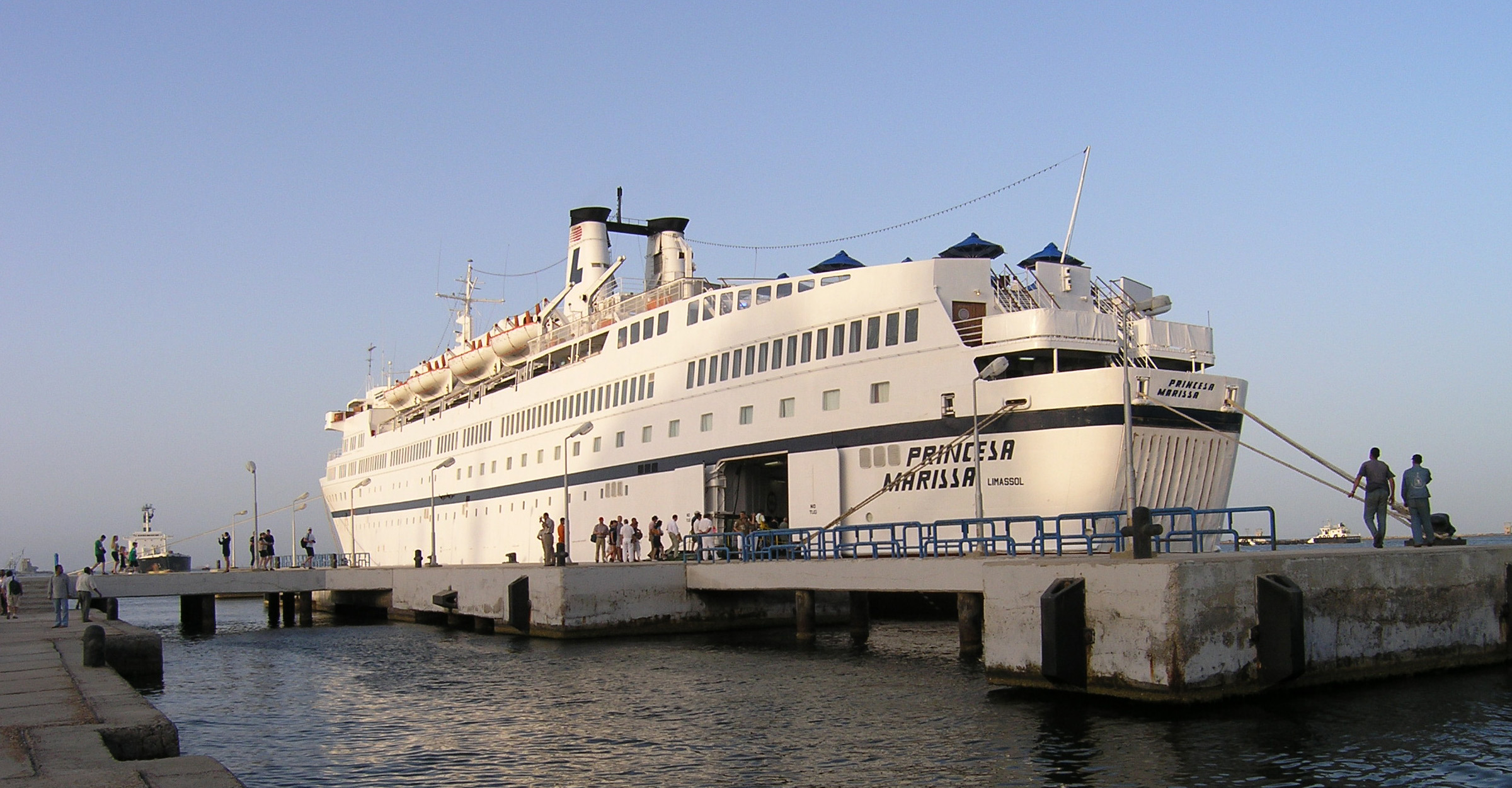
MS Princesa Marissa on Louis Cruise Lines service at Port Said on May 27, 2004

The ship was renamed Princesa Marissa after the founder's daughter, Marissa. Louis Cruise Lines used the Princesa Marissa for cruising around the Mediterranean, primarily from Cyprus to Egypt and Israel with the casino on board operated by Michel Bechara and the Stambouli Enterprises (Cyprus) Ltd. In 1995 the ship was once again rebuilt, this time cabins in the forward section of her fifth deck were enlarged, and even received large picture windows. Between June and August 2005 the ship sailed on the Pireus — Rhodes — Limassol route. After the end of this service she was laid up in Limassol. In May 2006 she was moved to Drapetsona where she was again laid up until June of the same year, when she returned to Pireus — Rhodes — Limassol service. In July 2006 the ship was chartered to German authorities to evacuate Canadian citizens and several other nationalities from Lebanon, after which she returned to normal service until August 11, 2006, when she was presumably again laid up. In May 2008 the ship was scrapped at Alang, India, under the temporary name "Prince", registered in Batumi, Georgia (Code Letters: 4LFF2). She arrived there on 16 June.

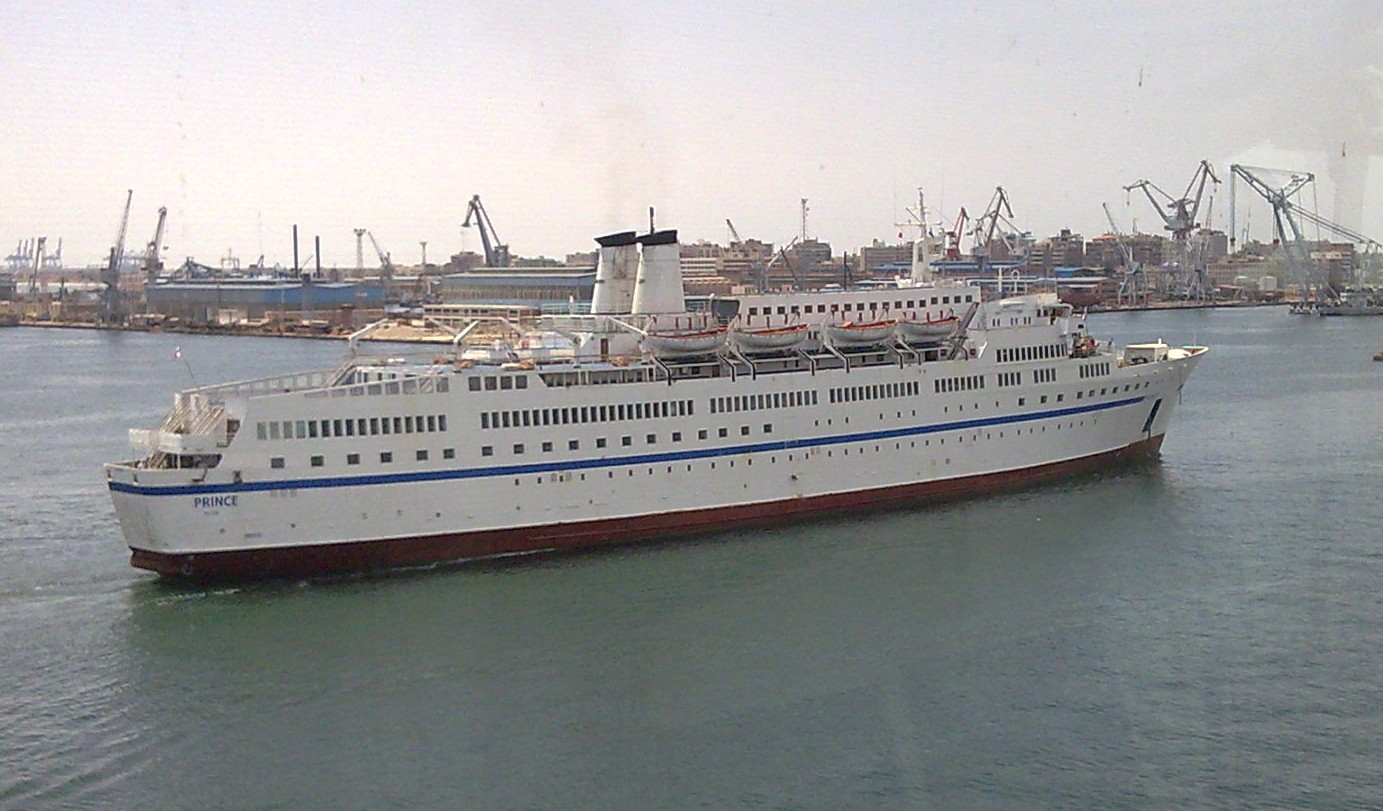
Prince in Port Said on May 23, 2008, during her last trip to the scrapyard of Alang.

== Decks ==
The ship had nine decks.
