= Jenny Saléns =

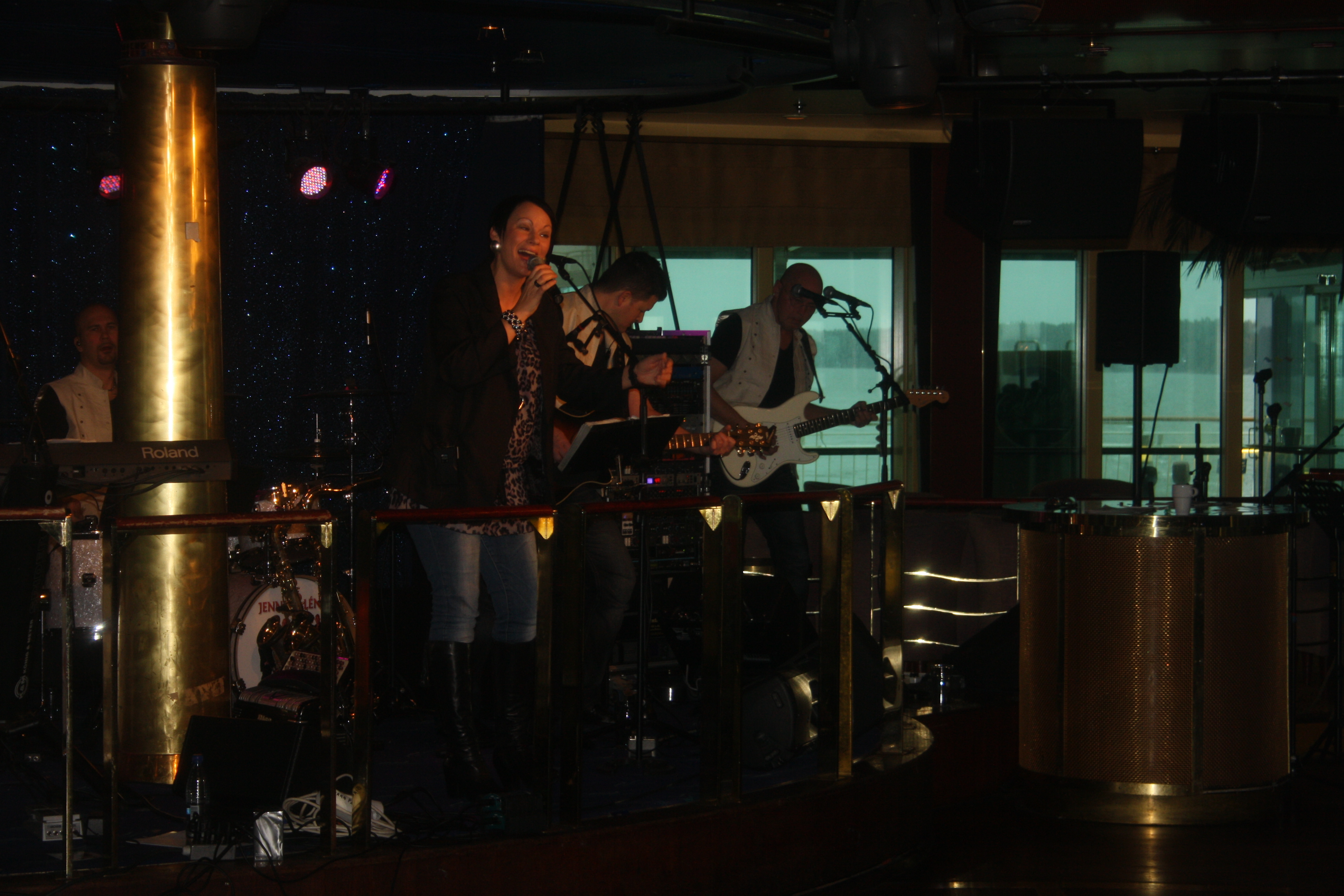
- Jenny Saléns live on board the M/S Birka Paradise. November 2011.

Background information
- Origin: Sweden
- Genres: Dansband music
- Years active: May 2003-

Jenny Saléns, established in May 2003, is a dansband from Sweden, scoring successes at the Swedish album chart. Saxophonist Niklas Adamsson won the "Wind musician of the Year" award at the 2007 Guldklaven awards. Later in 2007, Niklas Adamsson was appointed "Cultural Award Winner of the Year " in Hylte Municipality. On 5 January 2008, the live album "Vår egen bröllopsdag", with 15 songs recorded during a dancing event at Mälarsalen in Stockholm in November 2007. The band participated at Dansbandskampen 2008.

== Discography ==
=== Albums ===
- Vår egen bröllopsdag - 2008
- Nu bubblar blodet - 2012
- Mot nya mål - 2013
- För alltid - 2015

=== Singles ===
- "Kärlekens låga" - 2003
- "Aldrig mer" - 2004
- "Tack för kärleken" - 2006
- "Vår egen melodi" - 2006
- "Lovar du mer" - 2006
- "Mot kärlekens land" - 2007
- "Handen på hjärtat" - 2007
- "The Best" - 2009
- "Kom hem" - 2009

== Members ==
- Jenny Salén - vocals and accordion
- Niklas Adamsson - saxophone, guitar, vocals
- Nicklas Mörk - drums
- Robert Juth - guitar, vocals
