= MS Crown Iris =

Cruise ship built in 1992

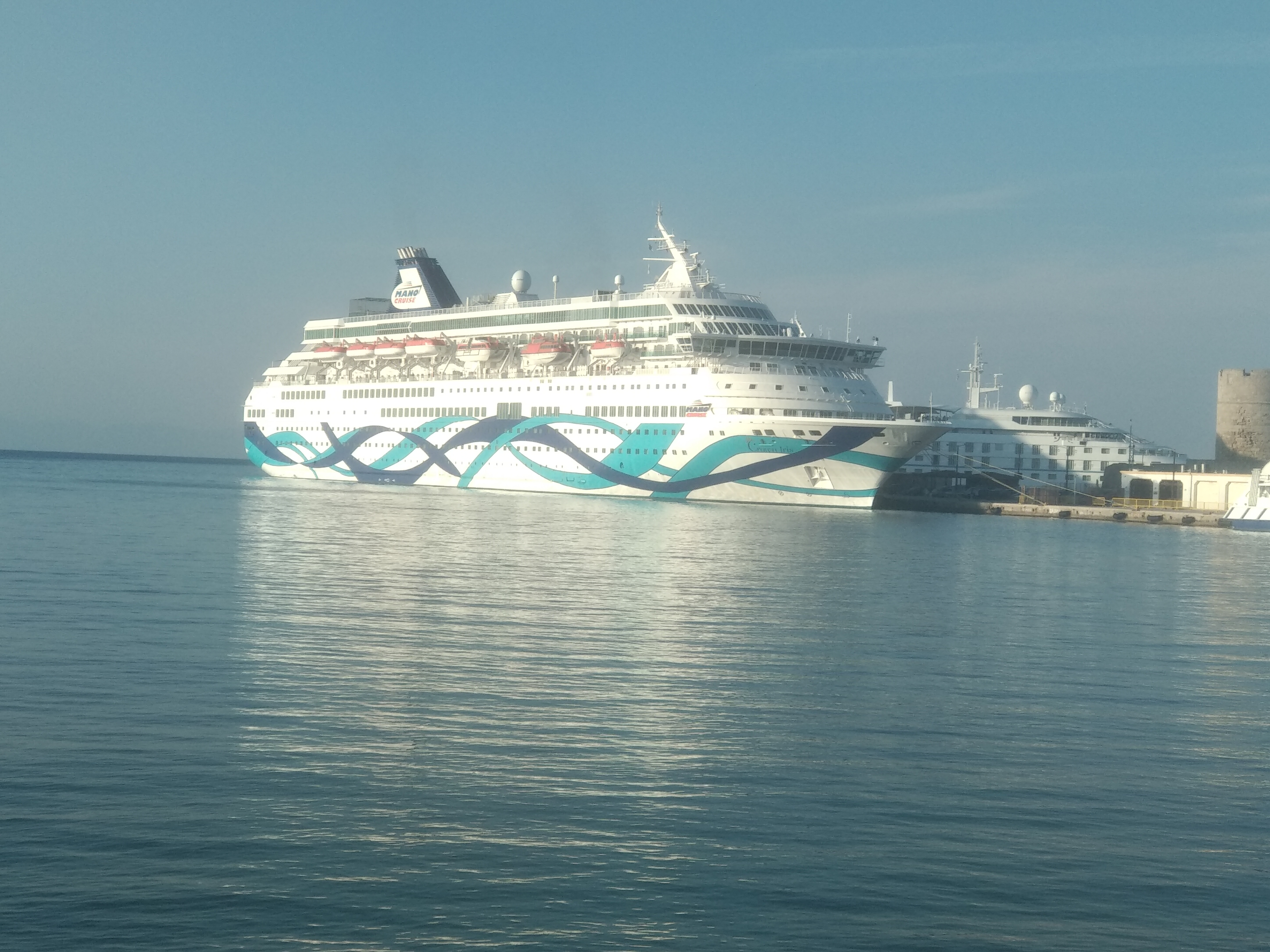
- Crown Iris in Rhodes

History
- Name: Royal Majesty (1992–1997); Norwegian Majesty (1997–2009); Louis Majesty (2009–2012); Thomson Majesty (2012–2017); Majesty (2017–2018); Princess Iris (2018–2018); Crown Iris (2018 – present)
- Owner: Majesty Cruise Line (1992–1997); Norwegian Cruise Line (1997–2004); Star Cruises (2004–2008); Louis Cruise Lines (2008–2018); Mano Maritime (2018 – present)
- Operator: Majesty Cruise Line (1992–1997); Norwegian Cruise Line (1997–2009); Louis Cruises (2009–2012); Thomson Cruises (2012–2017); Celestyal Cruises (2017–2018); Mano Maritime (2018 – present)
- Port of registry: 1992–1997: Panama, Panama; 1997–2009: Nassau, Bahamas; 2009–2018: Valletta, Malta; 2018 onwards: Panama, Panama
- Builder: Kvaerner Masa-Yards Turku New Shipyard, Finland
- Cost: $229 million
- Yard number: 1312
- Launched: 15 November 1991
- Christened: 29 July 1992
- Completed: 1992
- Acquired: 2 July 1992
- Maiden voyage: 7 July 1992
- In service: 1992
- Identification: Call sign: 3EGC6; IMO number: 8814744; MMSI number: 370610000
- Status: In service

General characteristics (as built)
- Type: Cruise ship
- Tonnage: 32,396 GT; 2,600 DWT
- Length: 173.50 m (569 ft 3 in)
- Beam: 27.60 m (90 ft 7 in)
- Draft: 6.20 m (20 ft 4 in)
- Ice class: 1 A Super
- Installed power: 4 × Wärtsilä 6R46; 21,120 kW (combined)
- Propulsion: Two controllable pitch propellers
- Speed: 20.5 knots (38.0 km/h; 23.6 mph)
- Capacity: 1,056 passengers (1,256 maximum)

General characteristics (after 1999 refit)
- Tonnage: 40,876 GT; 21,984 NT; 2,700 DWT
- Length: 207.1 m (679 ft)
- Beam: 27.60 m (90 ft 7 in) (moulded); 32.3 m (106 ft 0 in) (max)
- Draft: 6.20 m (20 ft 4 in)
- Depth: 14 m (45 ft 11 in)
- Decks: 9 (passenger accessible)
- Speed: 20 knots (37 km/h; 23 mph)
- Capacity: 1,460 passengers (1,970 maximum)
- Crew: 620
- Notes: Otherwise the same as built

MS Crown Iris is a cruise ship owned by the Israeli cruise line Mano Maritime since 2018. She was originally ordered by Birka Line as MS Birka Queen from the Wärtsilä Marine Turku Shipyard in Finland, but completed by Kvaerner Masa-Yards as MS Royal Majesty for Majesty Cruise Line. In 1997 she was sold to Norwegian Cruise Line as MS Norwegian Majesty and lengthened by 33.76 m (110 ft 9 in) at the Lloyd Werft shipyard in Bremerhaven, Germany. She was sold to Louis Cruises as MS Louis Majesty from 2008 to 2012 when she was chartered to Thomson Cruises as MS Thomson Majesty before being returned to Louis Cruises/Celestyal Cruises, as the Majesty. In 2018 the ship was sold to Mano Maritime.

== Concept and construction ==
Birka Queen was ordered by Birka Line for short cruises out of Stockholm as a running mate to MS Birka Princess. The ship was ordered from Wärtsilä Marine, but the shipyard went bankrupt in 1989. Operations were soon reorganized under the name of Masa-Yards, but the price of the ship was increased in the process, and Birka therefore refused to take delivery. Instead, the build contract was sold to Majesty Cruise Line, who took delivery of the ship on 2 July 1992, renaming her Royal Majesty. Due to her past, the ship has some features uncommon for cruise ships, such as the highest Finnish-Swedish ice class.

== Service history ==
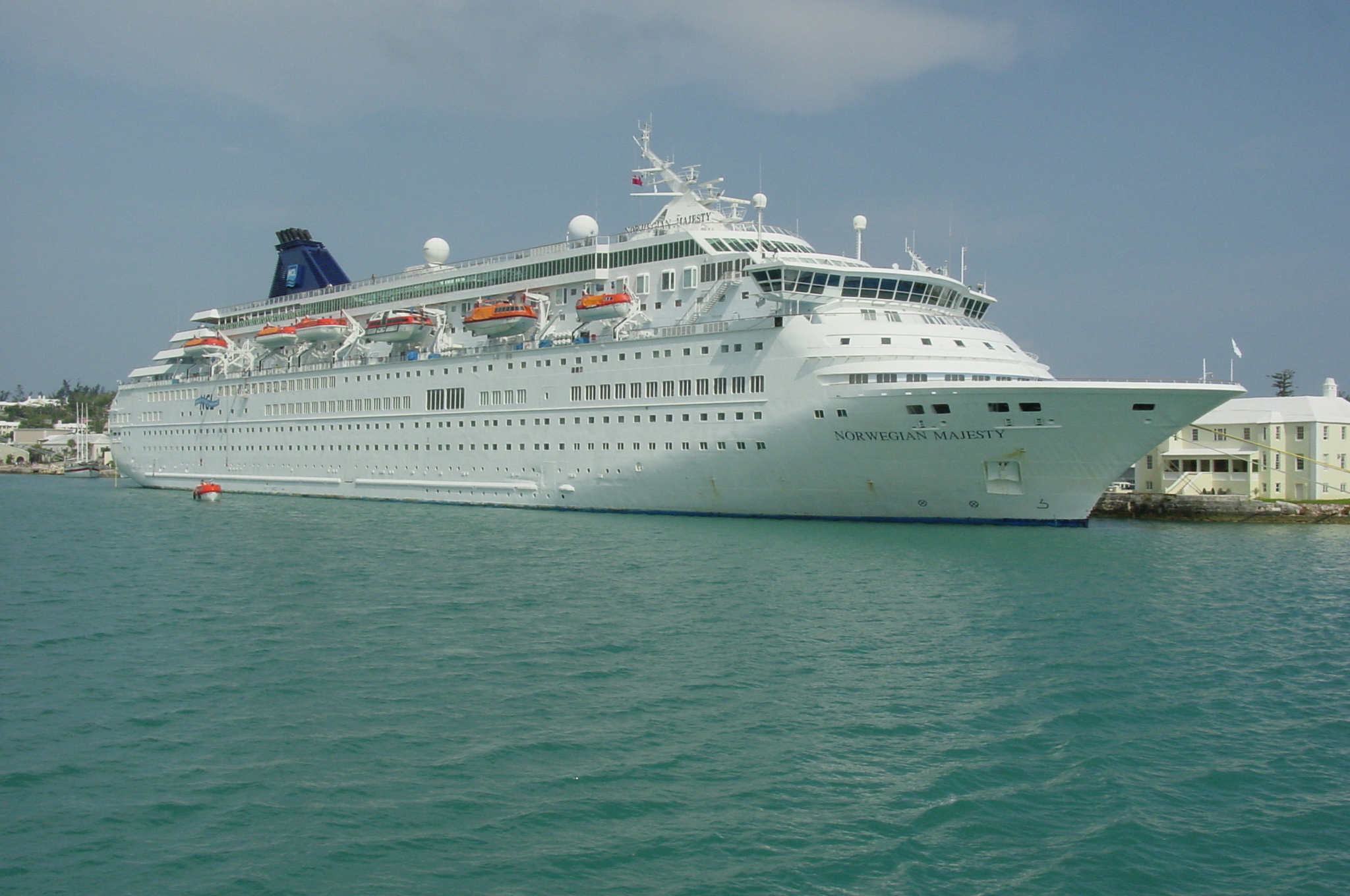
Norwegian Majesty, docked in St. George's, Bermuda in 2004, while being operated by Norwegian Cruise Line

Following delivery, Royal Majesty set on her maiden voyage, a transatlantic crossing from Southampton to New York City, on 7 July 1992. She was christened in New York City on 21 July 1992 by Liza Minnelli. Following this, she was used on three- and four-night cruises out of Florida. In 1994 she initiated a new Northern Hemisphere summer season itinerary with cruises from Boston to St. George's, Bermuda, returning to Florida for the winter season.

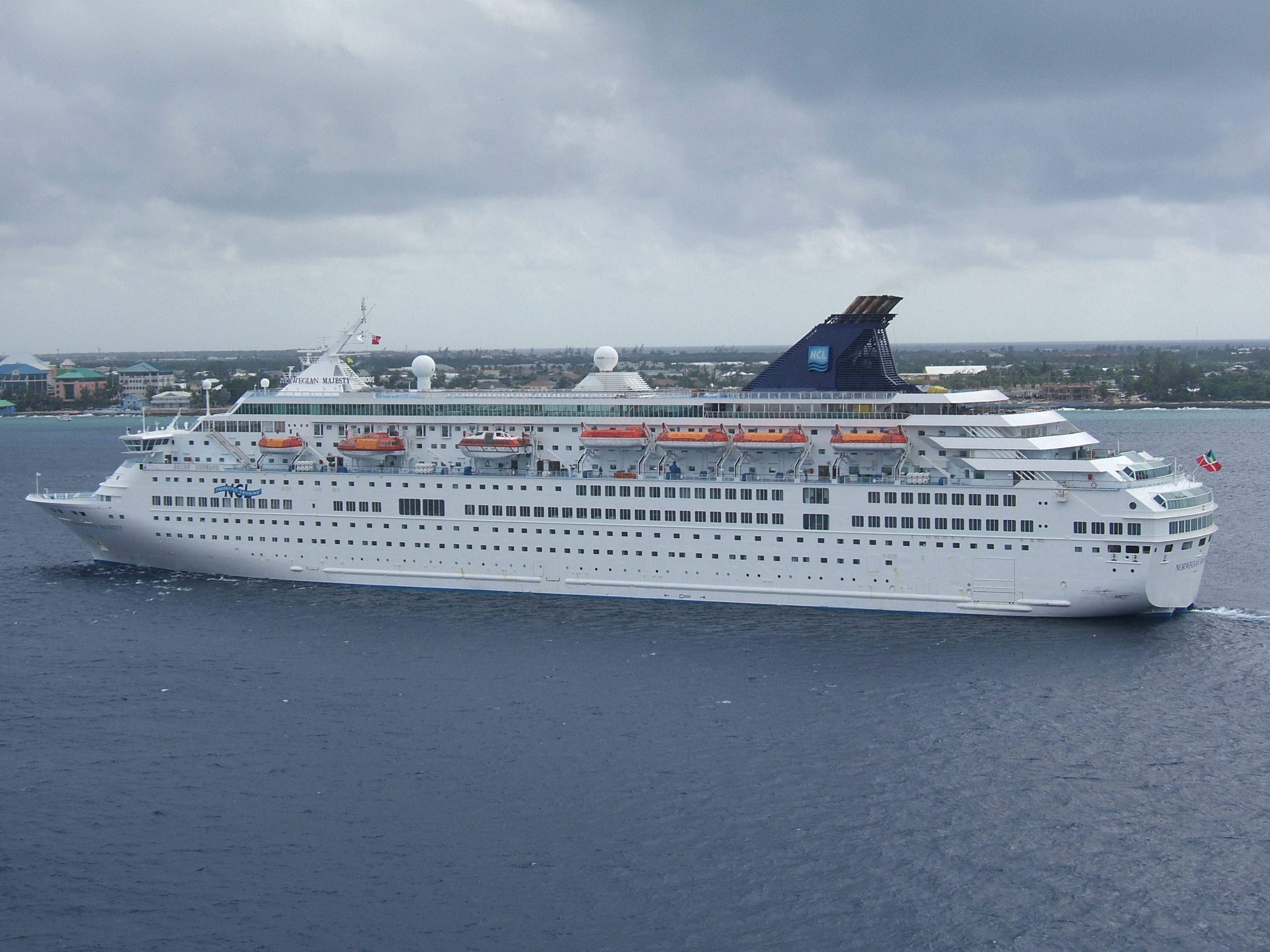
Norwegian Majesty, photographed in 2007, while being operated by Norwegian Cruise Line

On 10 June 1995, Royal Majesty grounded on Rose and Crown Shoal about 10 nautical miles (19 km) east of Nantucket Island, Massachusetts, and about 17 nmi (31 km) from where the watch officers thought the vessel was. Investigators found that the officers failed to act on visual cues about the vessel's location, over-relying on the automated bridge system. The vessel, with 1,509 persons on board, was en route from St. George's, Bermuda, to Boston, Massachusetts. There were no deaths or injuries as a result of this accident. Damage to the vessel and lost revenue, however, were estimated at $7 million.

In August 1996 she participated in the Titanic Expedition Cruise, an expedition to the sinking site of RMS Titanic. Sailing from Boston, passengers spent five days circling the site with many celebrities and survivors from the famous ship onboard while parts of Titanic were being salvaged.

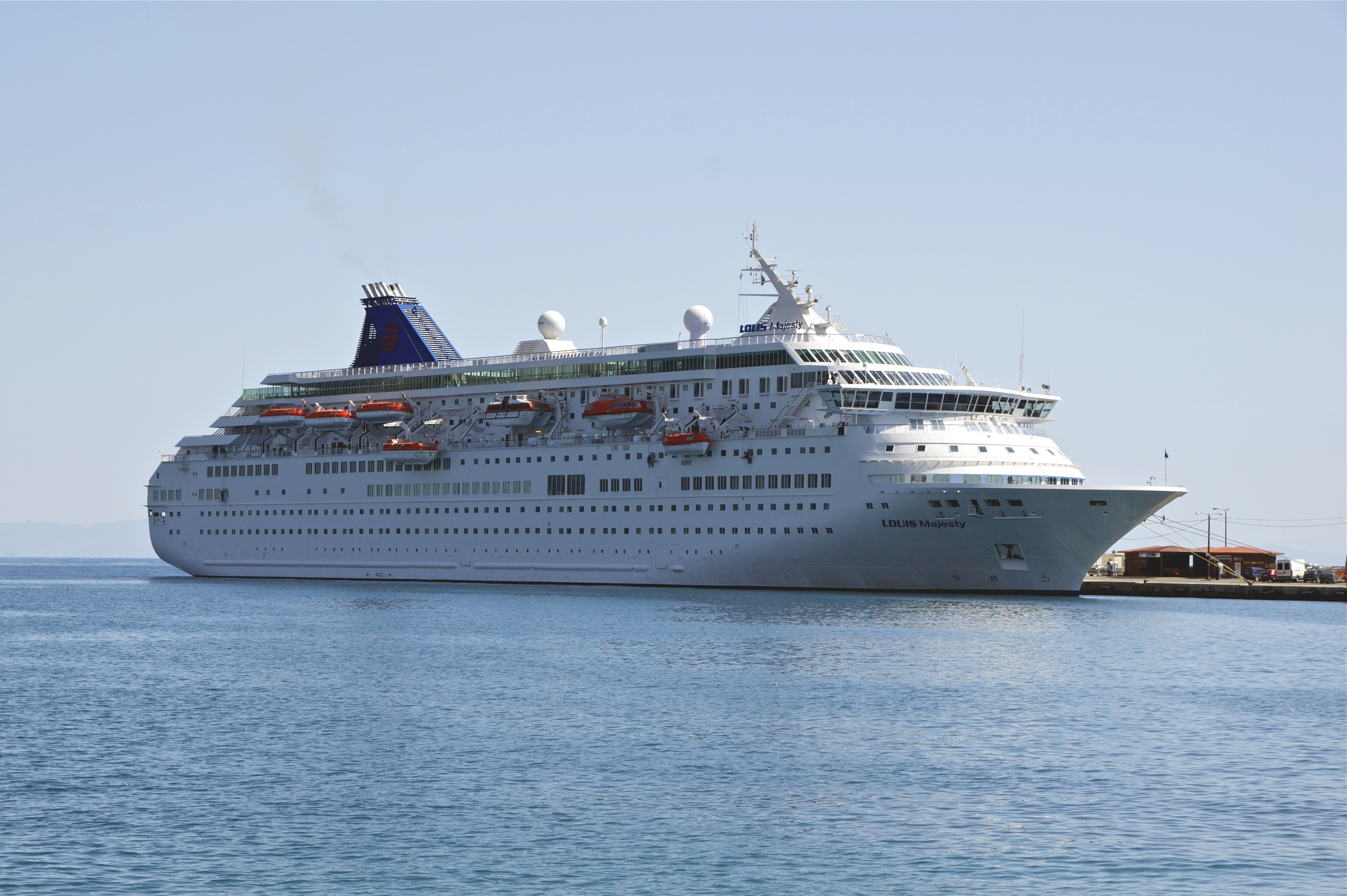
Louis Majesty, in the harbour of Rhodes, Greece

Majesty Cruise Line ceased operations at the end of the 1997 summer season, and Royal Majesty was sold to Norwegian Cruise Line. She was renamed Norwegian Majesty, and in 1999 she received a 33.76 m (110 ft 9 in) lengthening at the Lloyd Werft shipyard in Bremerhaven, Germany. Similar lengthenings had been carried out on NCL's Dreamward and Windward the previous year. The lengthening of the Norwegian Majesty however was more technically complicated than those of the other ships, as she had not been designed for such an operation.

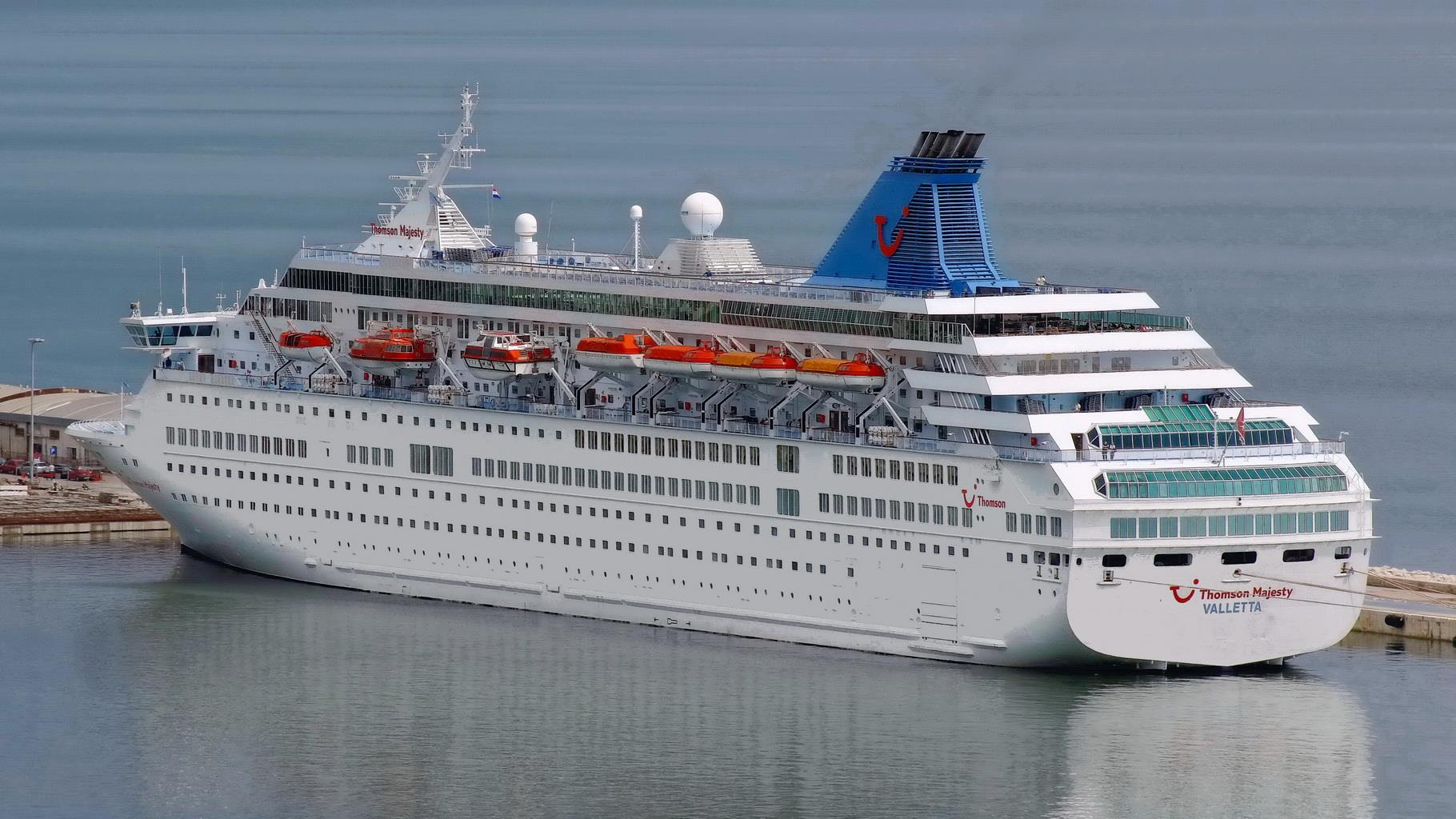
Thomson Majesty, docked in Split, Croatia, on 7 May 2013.

In 2004 the ownership of Norwegian Majesty was transferred to NCL's parent company Star Cruises in preparation for potential transfer to the Star Cruises fleet or sale at a later date. She remained in NCL service without other changes. On 23 April 2008 Norwegian Majesty, was sold to the Cyprus-based Louis Cruise Lines. Louis Cruise Lines had reportedly outbid International Shipping Partners with their offer of $162 million. The deal was completed on 29 July 2008, but Norwegian Majesty was chartered back to Norwegian Cruise Line until October 2009.

On 24 June 2009, Louis revealed that Norwegian Majesty would be renamed Louis Majesty. On 3 March 2010, three rogue waves hit Louis Majesty, killing two passengers, and injuring a number of others, while on a 12-day cruise around the Mediterranean. The waves, which were reportedly in excess of 26 feet (8 m) high, collided with the side of the vessel, smashing several windows in the saloon area. Water was taken on in the saloon area, which then drained down the decks below. The ship returned to port at Barcelona to receive repairs.

Louis Majesty was chartered to Thomson Cruises from May 2012 and renamed Thomson Majesty. It sailed from Corfu in the summer and the Canary Islands in the winter.

On 10 February 2013, while the ship was docked in Santa Cruz de la Palma in the Canary Islands, five crew members were killed and three others injured during a safety drill when the lifeboat they were in fell into the sea, trapping the occupants. Julian Bray, Marine Analyst in the UK, writing in the Cduck media news blog, confirms that crew were taking part in a training exercise to load, launch, and recover lifeboats, complete a regular risk/ safety programme and to ensure crew members have had recent practical training. Malta's Maritime Safety Investigation Unit subsequently issued a safety alert following the discovery of significant corrosion on the inner strands of the fall wire involved. The wire rope had parted approximately where it rested over the topmost sheave, when the davit was in its stowed position. The fore and aft davit's fall wires had been replaced on 22 August 2010 and the next scheduled replacement was due in August 2014. In her later career with Thomson Cruises, she was given a refit adding several balcony cabins to the ship.

In November 2017 she joined "Celestyal Cruises" and renamed simply as "Majesty".

== Service as Crown Iris ==
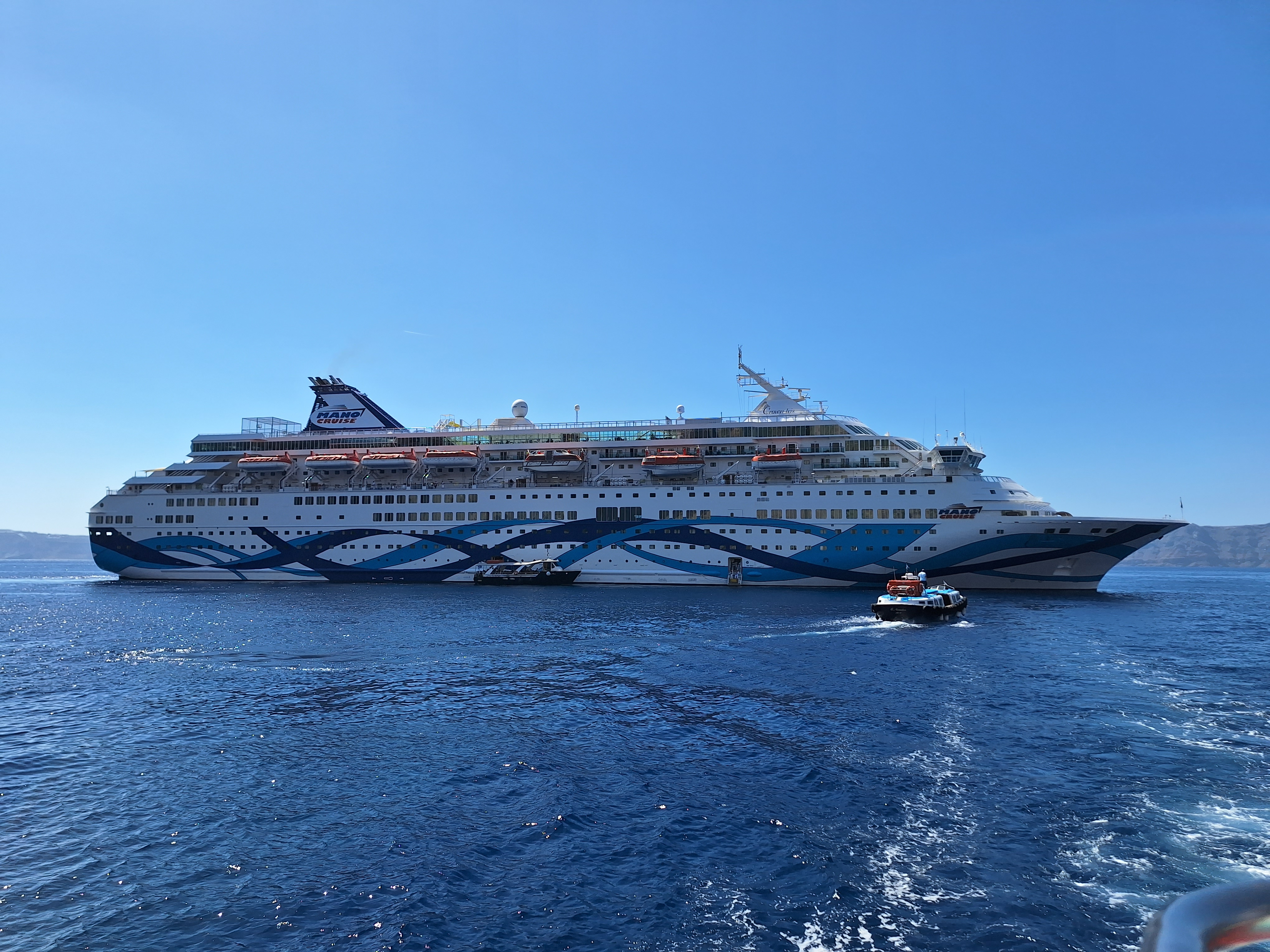
MS Crown Iris at Santorini

In late 2018, the ship was sold to the Israeli cruise line Mano Maritime (Mano Cruise) and renamed Crown Iris.

The ship went through an extensive refit in Chalkis Shipyards, Greece during 2019. All the guest rooms were renovated and five new restaurants were established, a basketball court was added to the superstructure of the ship and a yellow water slide was added to one of the outdoor pools.

The exterior design of the ship was also upgraded, graphics of "waves" in blue and turquoise were painted on both sides of the ship and the flooring of all decks was replaced.

On 11 April 2019, the Crown Iris launching ceremony was held in the Port of Haifa, Israel.

The ship operates holiday cruises from the ports of Haifa and Ashdod, Israel. The ship's destinations are Cyprus, Greek islands, France, Croatia, Malta and Italy.

On 10 October 2023, with the beginning of the Gaza war by Israel, the Crown Iris participated in the rescue of Israelis and brought them back to Israel from Cyprus.

On 9 October 2024, the Crown Iris rescued three Turkish citizens whose yacht sank near the island of Rhodes.

During the 2025 Iran–Israel War, the Crown Iris participated in an operation to rescue Israelis back to Israel from Cyprus. The ship transported over 2,000 Israelis from Cyprus back to Israel.

Also, the Crown Iris transported over 1,600 tourists from Israel to Cyprus.

== Gallery ==
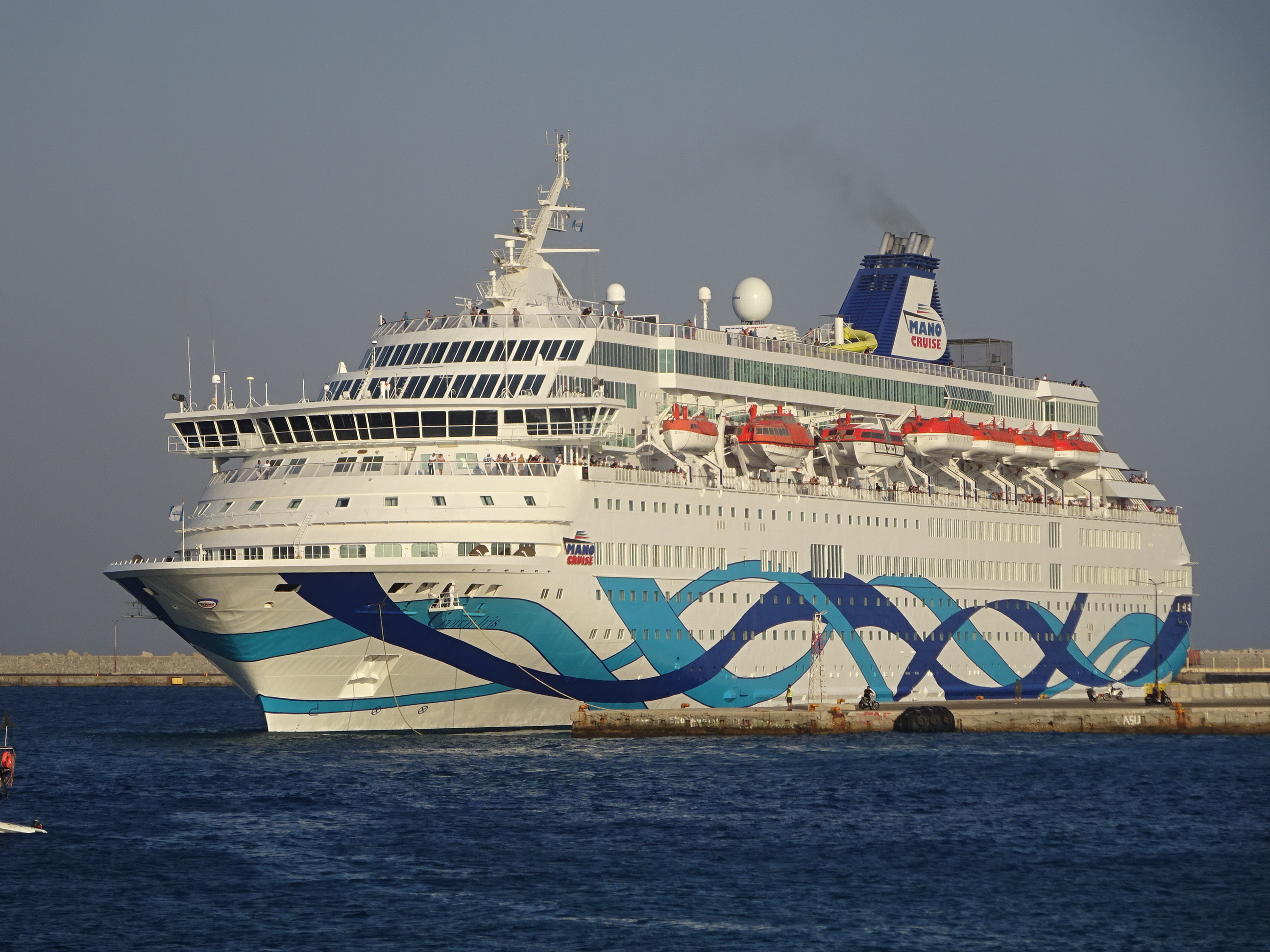
Crown Iris departing from Quay in Port of Rhodes

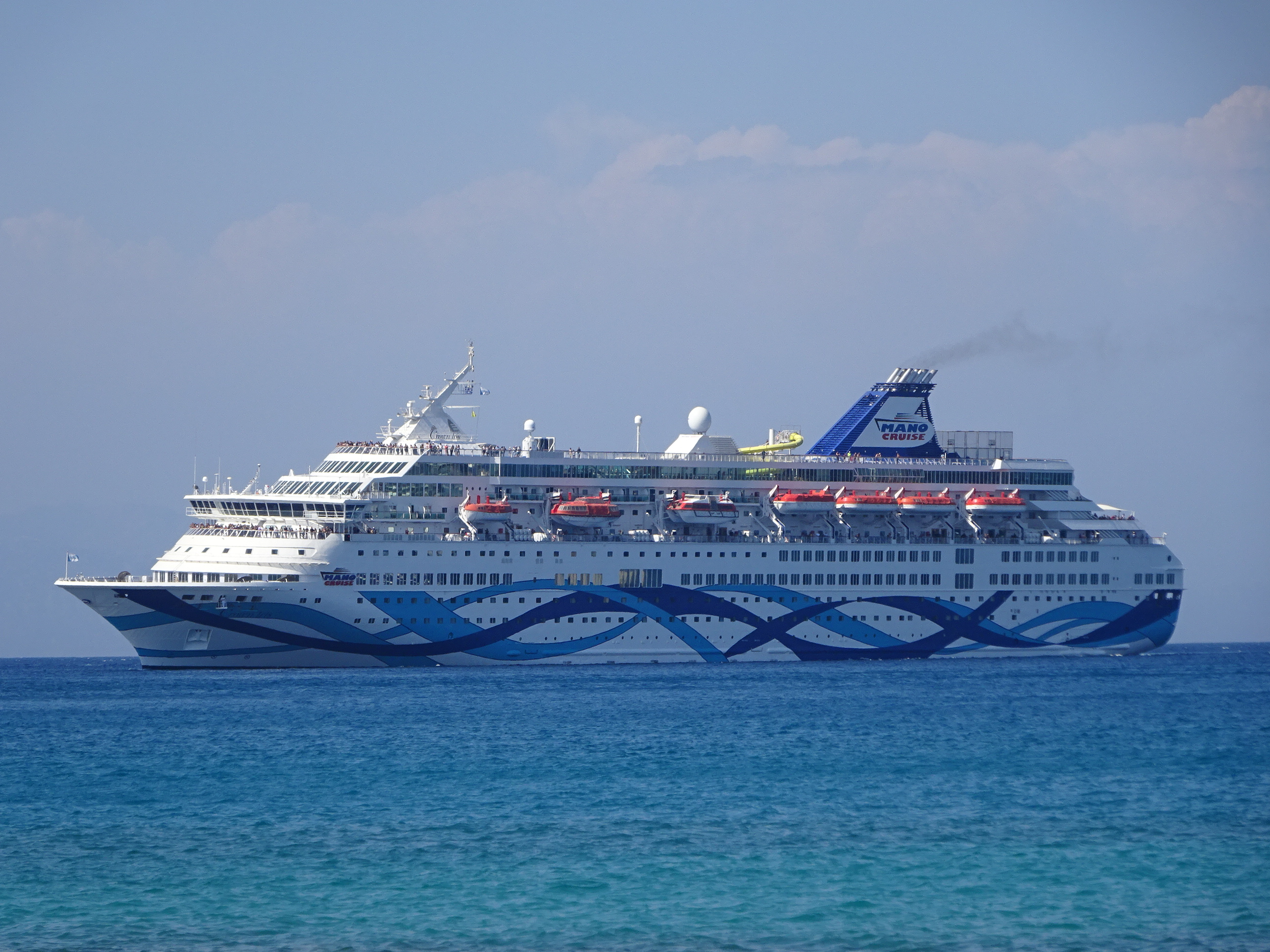
Crown Iris in Rhodes

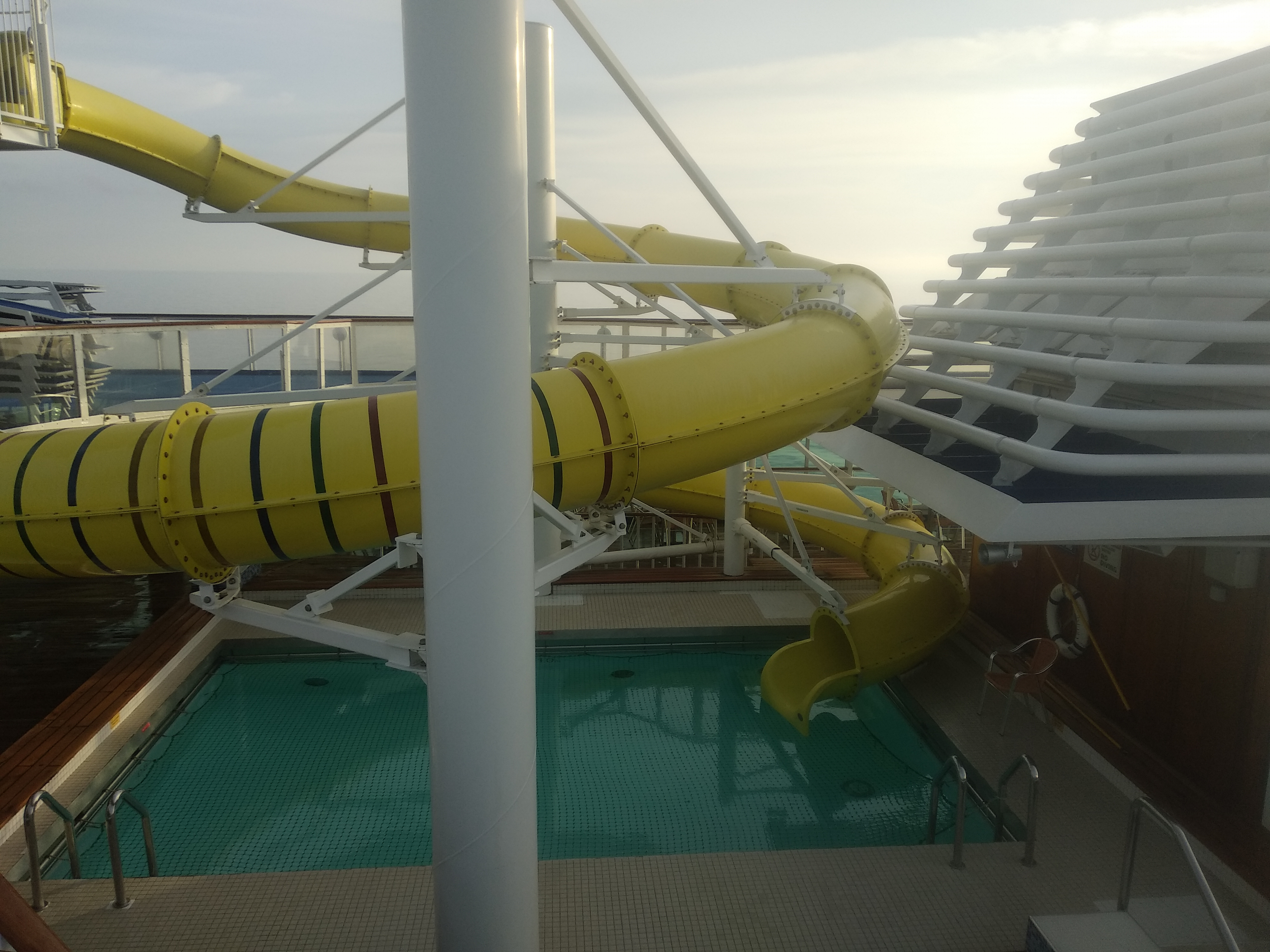
Crown Iris water slide
