= Majesty Cruise Line =

Norwegian cruise line (1992–1997)

- Industry: Cruise Line
- Founded: 1992
- Defunct: 1997
- Headquarters: Miami, FL,

Majesty Cruise Line was a Norwegian cruise line that was founded in 1992 and merged into Norwegian Cruise Line in 1997. Majesty was created by Dolphin Cruise Line as a more upmarket brand.

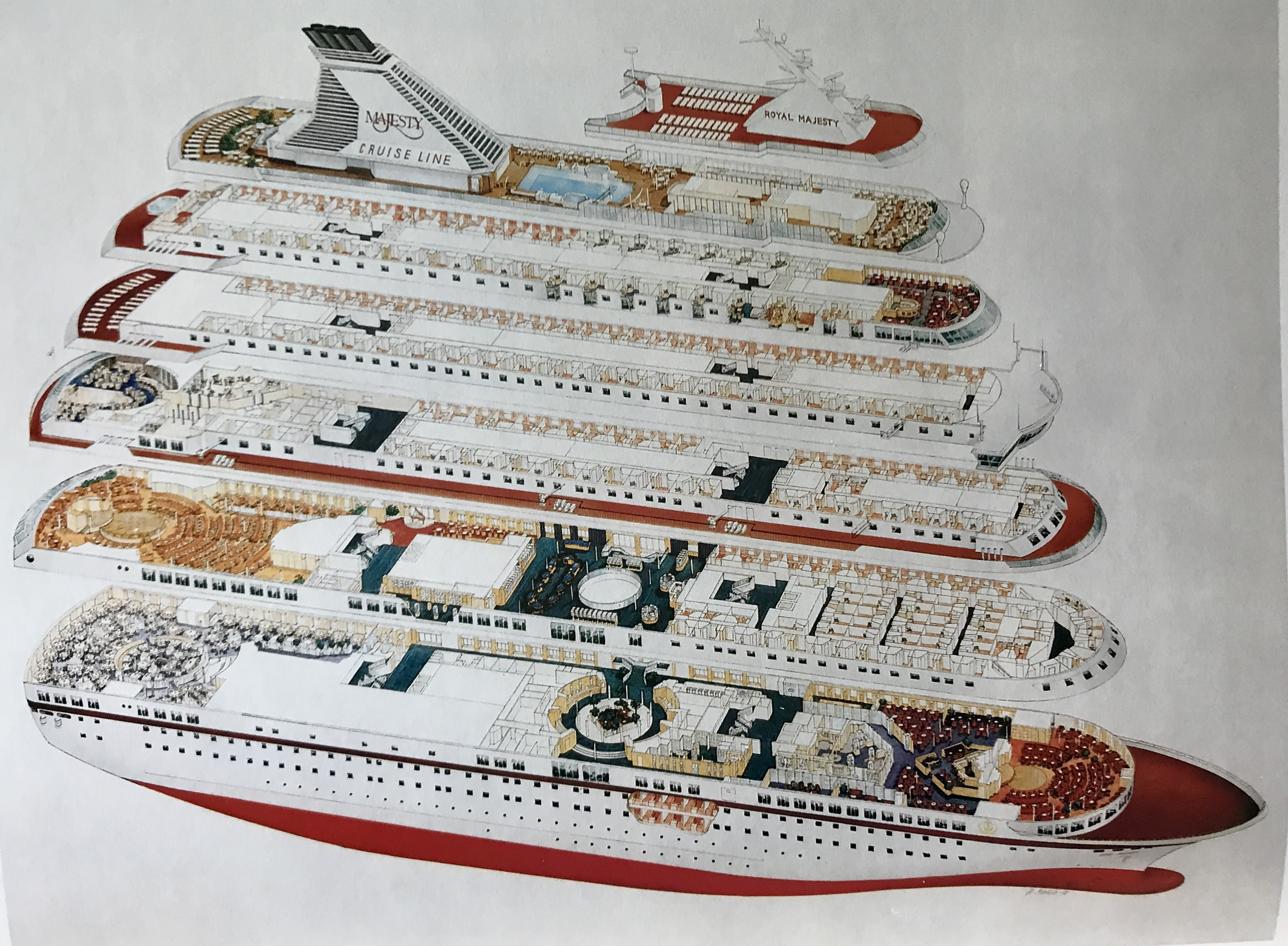
Cutaway of the Royal Majesty

Majesty's first ship, the Royal Majesty, was originally ordered by competitor Birka Line for 24-hour cruise operations out of Stockholm. Following the bankruptcy of shipbuilder Wärtsilä, the contract was resold to Majesty. She initially worked three- and four-night cruises out of Florida, but in 1995 opened a new summer Boston-Bermuda route, terminating at St. George's rather than the usual Hamilton in Bermuda. Royal Majesty returned to Florida in the winter. In June 1995, she ran aground on Rose and Crown shoal of Nantucket Island, due to a combination of faulty GPS and inadequate watch. Royal Majesty was 17 miles off course and was situated for 24 hours before tugs towed her off.

In 1997, a second ship titled Crown Majesty (previously Crown Dynasty) was added . For the 1997 season, she continued the same cruise operations planned for Crown Dynasty, but at the end of that season both ships became part of the Norwegian Cruise Line (NCL). Royal Majesty was sold to NCL and was renamed Norwegian Majesty. Crown Majesty also had her charter transferred to NCL.

Majesty Cruise Line Fleet
Ship Name	Year in Fleet	Notes
Royal Majesty	1992-1997	Originally ordered by Birka Line
Crown Majesty	1997	

Dekker, Sydney; et al. (January 2002). "On your Watch: Automation on the Bridge". The Journal of Navigation. 55 (11): 83–96. doi:10.1017/S0373463301001588.
