= Birka Gotland =

Cruise ship

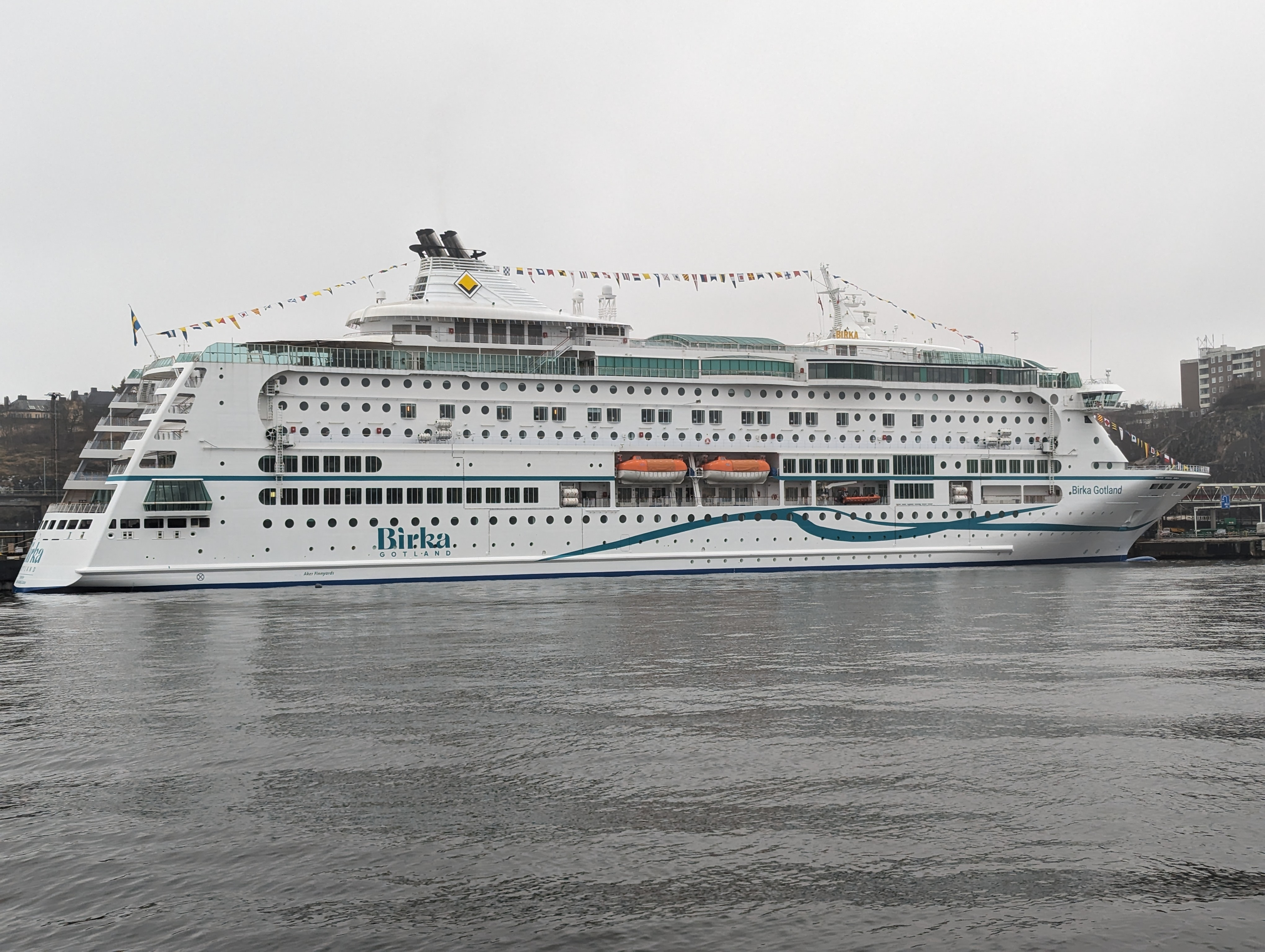
- Birka Stockholm in Stockholm, March 2024.

History

Sweden
- Name: 2004–2013: Birka Paradise; 2013–2024: Birka Stockholm; 2024 onwards: Birka Gotland
- Owner: 2004–2011: Birka Line Abp; 2011–2023: Rederi Ab Eckerö; 2023 onwards: Gotland Alandia Cruises
- Port of registry: 2004–2009: Mariehamn, Åland (Finland); 2009 onwards: Stockholm, Sweden
- Route: Laid up. To enter service for new, unnamed company owned by Rederi AB Gotland and Viking Line in 2024.
- Ordered: 19 November 2002
- Builder: Aker Finnyards, Rauma, Finland
- Yard number: 442
- Laid down: 19 October 2003
- Launched: 15 April 2004
- Christened: 10 November 2004 by Arja Saijonmaa
- Completed: 8 November 2004
- In service: 11 November 2004
- Identification: IMO number: 9273727; Call sign: SIJW; MMSI number: 266314000
- Status: in service

General characteristics
- Type: Cruise ship
- Tonnage: 34,924 GT; 18,839 NT; 4,022 DWT
- Length: 177 m (580 ft 9 in)
- Beam: 28 m (91 ft 10 in)
- Height: 43 m (141 ft 1 in)
- Draught: 6.5 m (21 ft 4 in)
- Depth: 9.4 m (30 ft 10 in)
- Decks: 11 (10 passenger accessible)
- Ice class: 1 A Super
- Installed power: 4 × Wärtsilä 6L46; 23,400 kW (combined)
- Speed: 21 knots (39 km/h; 24 mph) service speed
- Capacity: 1,800 passengers

Birka Gotland is a cruise ship owned jointly by Rederi AB Gotland and Viking Line. She was built in 2004 by Aker Finnyards at Rauma, Finland for Birka Line, later owned by Rederi Ab Eckerö, and operated under their Birka Cruises brand. She sailed as Birka Paradise until 2013 and as Birka Stockholm until 2024.

== Concept and construction ==
Birka Paradise was ordered by Birka Line from Aker Finnyards at Rauma, Finland, on 20 November 2002. She was the first new ship ordered by Birka Line since Birka Queen, ordered in the late 1980s, but never delivered due to bankruptcy of the Wärtsilä Marine shipyard.

The interior and exterior of Birka Paradise were jointly designed by Birka Line, Aker Finnyards and Deltamarin. Unlike most of Birka's previous vessels, the ship was designed from the beginning as a genuine cruise ship, without a car-deck. Following a naming competition that drew 3500 proposals, the ship was named Birka Paradise to reflect its design, reminiscent of a Caribbean cruise ship. The ship was designed with various environmentally friendly innovations; in addition to exhaust and closed sewage treatment systems already used on the company's Birka Princess, Birka Paradise was built to fulfill DNV' Clean Design rule relating to environmentally friendly structural solutions. Her hull form was optimised for smallest possible impact on the sensitive archipelago routes on which she sails.

The keel of Birka Paradise was laid on 19 October 2003 and she was launched on 15 April 2004. Following her sea trials on 19 August and 14 October, the ship was delivered to Birka Line on 8 November 2004. The ship then sailed via her port of registry Mariehamn to Stockholm, where she was officially named on 10 November 2004 by Arja Saijonmaa.

== Service history ==
Birka Paradise entered service on 11 November 2004 on a 22-hour cruise from Stockholm to Mariehamn, which has been her main route in Birka service. During Christmas 2004 she made a longer cruise from Stockholm, calling at Tallinn, Helsinki and Mariehamn. From 2006 onwards she has made various longer cruises from Stockholm around the Baltic Sea during the Northern Hemisphere summer season.

In January 2009 Rederi Ab Eckerö, owner of Birka Cruises since 2007, made public their plans to re-register Birka Paradise to Sweden "as soon as possible" in order to allow the sale of snuff on board. According to European Union (EU) legislation snuff may not be sold within the EU except in Sweden and on board ships registered in Sweden. Until November 2007 the province of Åland in Finland allowed the sale of snuff on board ships registered in the province, but was forced to discontinue the practice when threatened by legal action by the EU. The outlawing of snuff sales caused the loss of approximately 1 million € per year for Birka Cruises, finally resulting in the decision to re-flag Birka Paradise. The reflagging took place on 3 June 2009. Registered ownership of Birka Stockholm was transferred to Rederi Ab Eckerö in 2011.

In January 2013 the ship was renamed Birka Stockholm and given new livery. The stripes on the hull were changed from blue, yellow and red to just blue and yellow, and the new "Birka Cruises" logo was placed on the funnel. According to the CEO, the company wanted to make a "change of profile" to a more Northern European theme. However, the company refers to the ship only as Birka, dropping "Stockholm" which is part of the official name, as well as being the port of registry.

Due to the effects of the COVID-19 pandemic Rederi Ab Eckerö, ceased operations and the ship was put up for sale.

== New ownership ==
On 23 March 2023, Rederi AB Gotland announced that it bought the Birka Stockholm for approximately 38 million euro to be used for traffic between Stockholm, Mariehamn and Visby. The service was to have begun in the spring of 2024.

On 9 August 2023, Viking Line announced it had acquired a 50% shareholding in of the ship for 19 million Euro with the intention to form a company with shared ownership with Rederi AB Gotland, for the intended traffic previously outlined. When entering the service for the new company in April 2024, the ship will be renamed Birka Gotland.
