= Birka Cruises =

Cruise ship company

Birka Line
- Company type: Subsidiary
- Industry: Transportation
- Founded: 1971
- Defunct: 2020
- Headquarters: Mariehamn
- Products: Cruises
- Website: http://www.birkacruises.com/

Birka Cruises (formerly Birka Line) was an Ålandian shipping company that operated a cruise ship on the Baltic Sea with Stockholm as the starting point under the name Birka Cruises. Birka Line has a cargo-shipping subsidiary, Birka Cargo. During the 1970s the company was often marketed as Ålandslinjen. Since May 2007 Birka Line has been a daughter company of Rederiaktiebolaget Eckerö.

In July 2020 Eckerö Line announced that it was shutting down its Birka Cruises subsidiary after 49 years of operation.

== History ==
Birka Line was founded in 1971, they bought MS Prinsessen from DFDS and renamed her MS Prinsessan. On November 21, she made her first voyage between Stockholm and Mariehamn. In 1972, Prinsessan's sister ship MS Olav was bought and renamed MS Baronessan. In 1973 Birka started traffic on the routes Stockholm–Helsinki with MS Freeport and Stockholm–Helsinki–Leningrad with MS Drottningen. However, due to rising fuel costs and the high fuel consumption of the Freeport, both lines were terminated in late 1973. The Freeport was sold to Rederi AB Svea and the Drottningen returned to her owners SJ. The company continued operating with the Prinsessan and Baronessan until 1978. The first Prinsessan was renamed Prinsen to free the name for a newer ship, MS Finnhansa that was purchased from Finnlines in January 1978 and renamed MS Prinsessan. In 1980 the Baronessan was sold to Panamian interests.

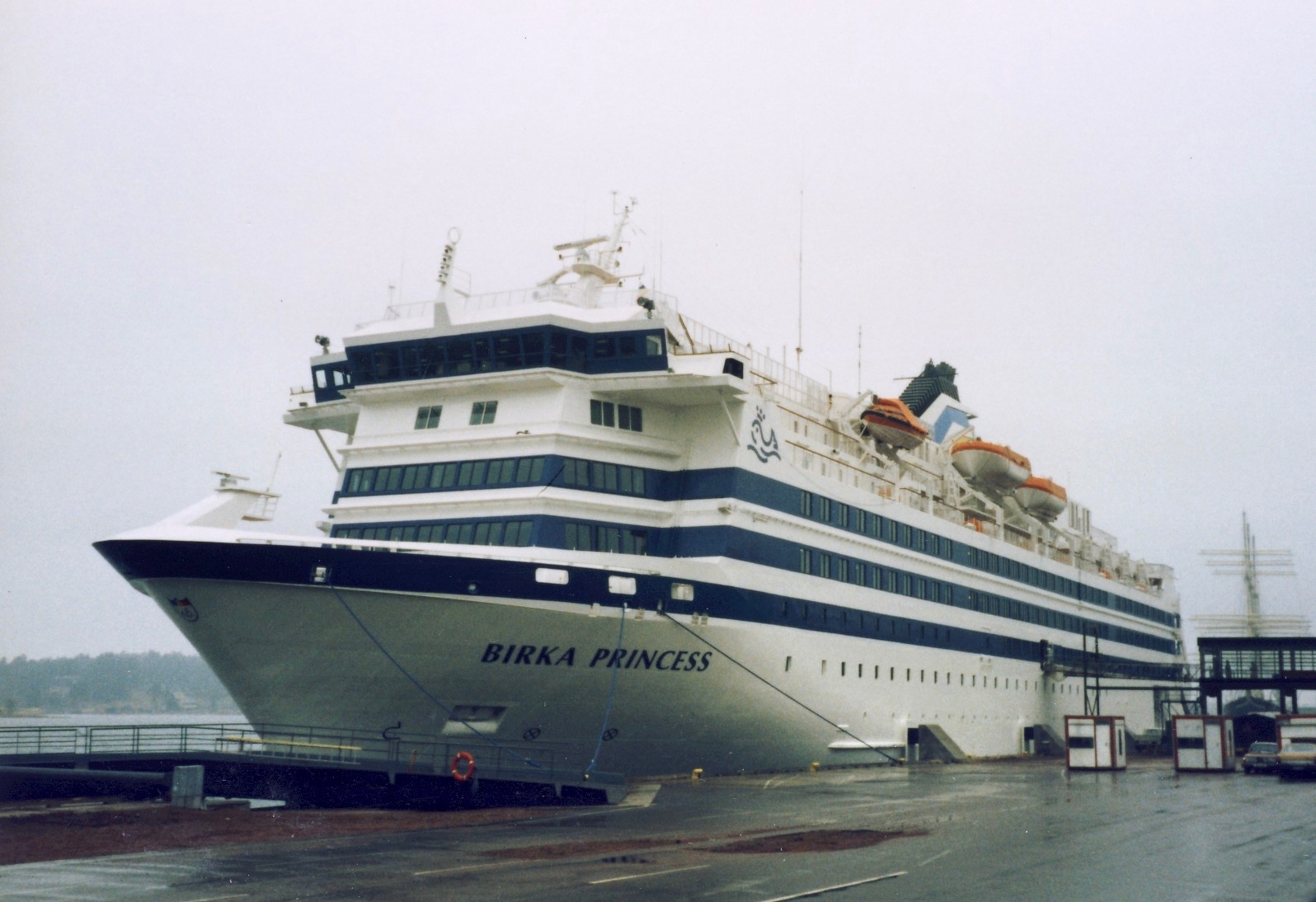
Birka's first newbuilding MS Birka Princess in her original appearance, photographed in Mariehamn.

On 22 April 1986 Birka's first newbuilding MS Birka Princess was delivered from the Valmet Vuosaari shipyard in Helsinki. With the delivery of the new ship, the company became marketed as Birka Cruises, as an attempt to show its focus on cruises. The following year the Prinsessan was sold to Louis Cruise Lines, becoming their Princesa Marissa. In 1990 Birka Line purchased the majority of United Shipping.

In the late 1980s the company placed an order for a second cruise ship, to operate alongside the Birka Princess, from Wärtsilä Turku shipyard. The ship was to be named MS Birka Queen, but during construction the shipyard went bankrupt, radically raising the cost of the ship. Birka did not accept delivery of the ship with such a high price, and the ship was instead completed for Majesty Cruise Line as Royal Majesty. In place of the Birka Queen Birka Line purchased MS Sunward from Norwegian Cruise Line in May 1992, and renamed her MS Birka Queen for cruising from Stockholm to Riga and St. Petersburg. In October the same year, the ship was chartered back to NCL. Although she remained under Birka Line ownership until 1997, the second Birka Queen never sailed for Birka Line again.

In 1999 the Birka Princess was rebuilt with additional cabins and more streamlined superstructure. In January 2002 Birka Line purchased the entirety of United Shipping which was renamed Birka Cargo. In November of the same year the company placed an order for a new cruise ship with Aker Finnyards, Rauma. The ship was completed as MS Birka Paradise in 2004. The ship was delivered in a time when there was a very strong competition for cruise and ferry passengers on the northern Baltic Sea. Due to lack of passengers and because of financial problems, the Birka Princess was sold to Louis Cruise Lines in early 2006. On 8 March 2007 it was reported that the fellow Ålandian shipping company Rederiaktiebolaget Eckerö was looking to purchase Birka Line in its entirety (Eckerö already owned 42% of Birka Line). On 24 May 2007 it was reported that a public offer made by Eckerö had increased their ownership in Birka Line to 57.9%. On 28 May Birka Line officially became a daughter company of Eckerö Line.

== Fleet ==
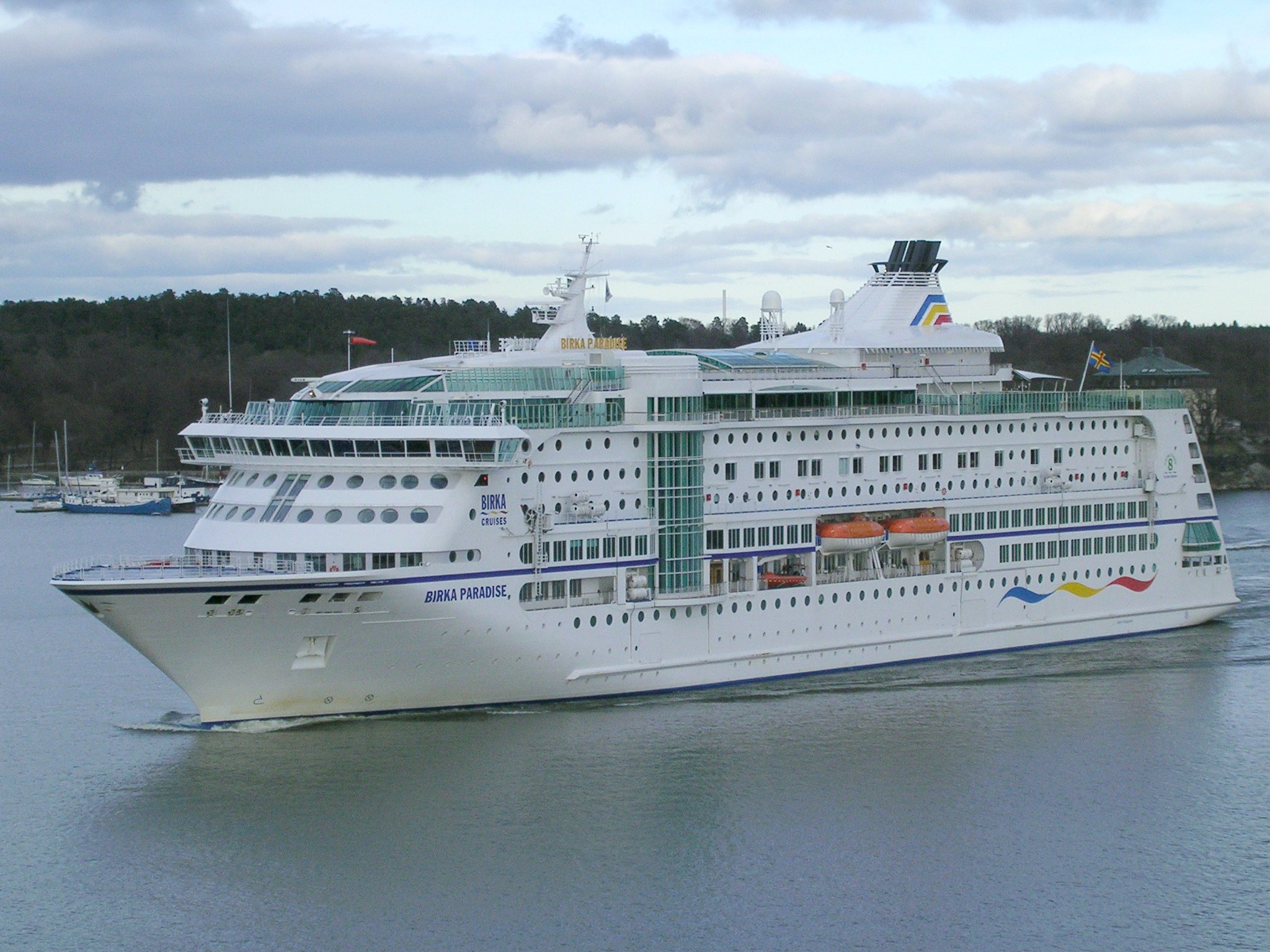
Birka Paradise is Birka Line's flagship, built in 2004.

=== Birka Cruises ===
Ship	Type	Built	In service	Route	Tonnage	Flag	Notes
MS Birka Stockholm	Cruise ship	2004	2004–2020	Stockholm–Mariehamn	34,924 GT	Sweden	

=== Birka Cargo ===
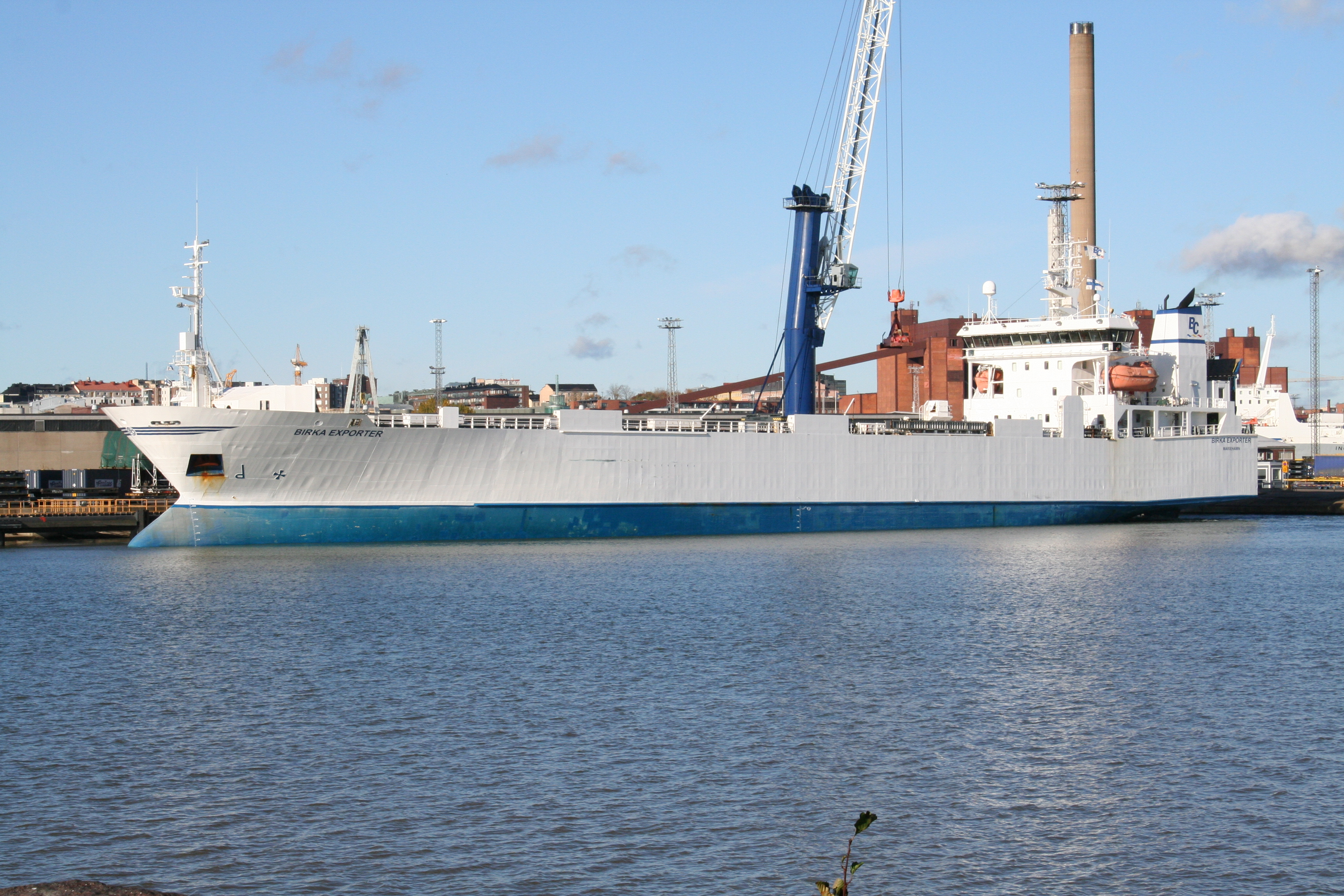
MS Birka Exporter, a Birka Cargo ship, in Helsinki.

- MS Birka Carrier
- MS Birka Exporter
- MS Birka Express
- MS Birka Shipper
- MS Birka Trader
- MS Birka Transporter
- MS Baltic Excellent

=== Former ships ===
- MS Prinsessan (1971–77) / MS Prinsen (1977–78)—scrapped 1987
- MS Baronessan (1972–80)—scrapped 2003
- MS Freeport (1973–74)—scrapped 2011
- MS Drottningen (1971–77)—scrapped 2005
- MS Prinsessan (1978–87)—scrapped 2008
- MS Birka Princess (1986–2006)—sank in 2007 as MS Sea Diamond (Louis Cruise Lines)
- MS Birka Queen (1992)—scrapped 2021
- MS Birka Forest (2002–04)—now MS Westwood Pomona for Westwood Shipping Lines

=== Ordered but never delivered ===
- MS Birka Queen (planned delivery 1992)—now MS Thomson Majesty for Thomson Holidays
