= Sea Diamond =

Cruise ship built in 1984

Coordinates: 36°23′41″N 25°25′51″E

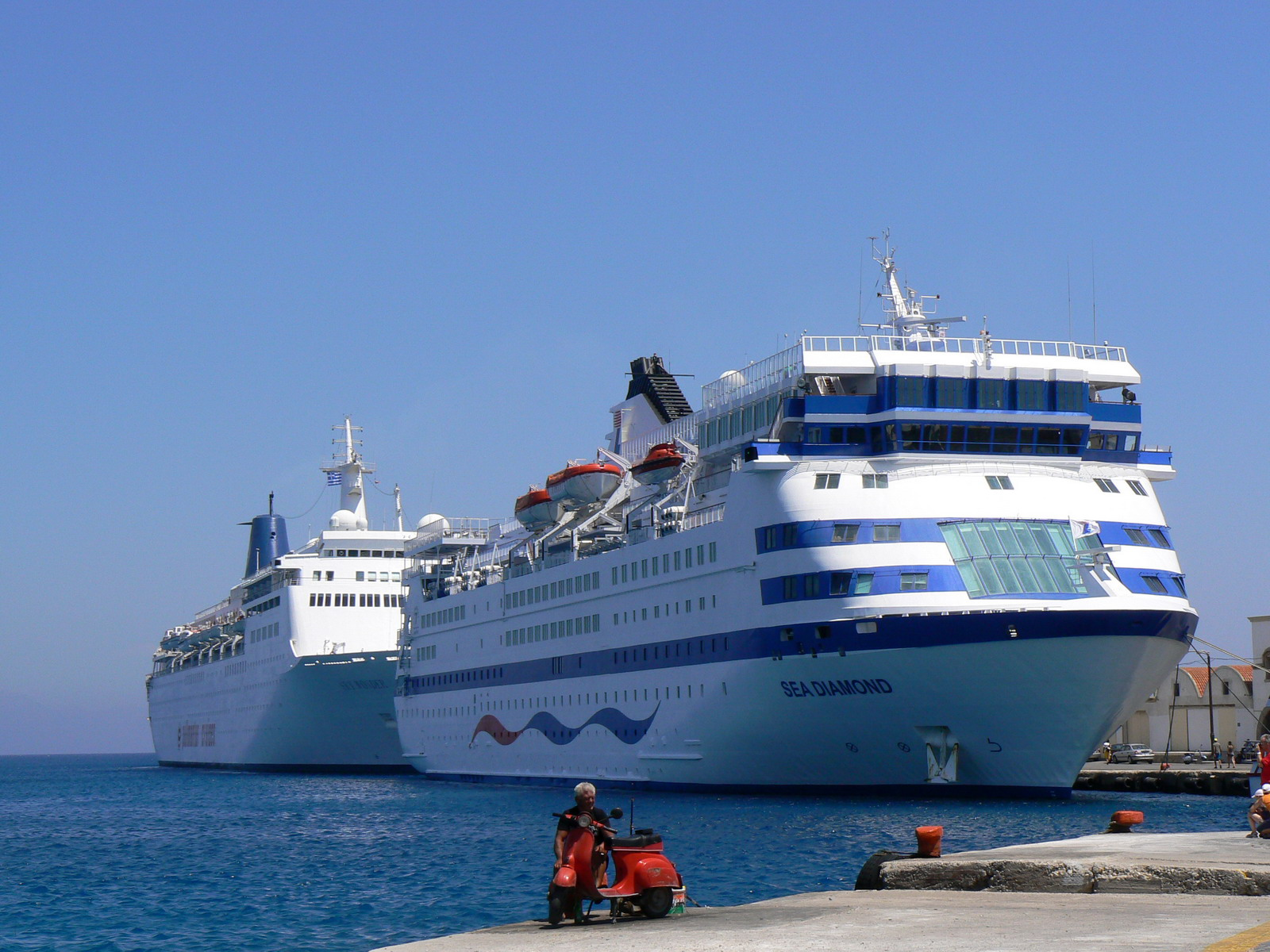
- Sea Diamond at Rhodes, Greece

History
- Name: 1986–2006: Birka Princess; 2006–2007: Sea Diamond
- Owner: 1986–2006: Birka Line; 2006–2007: Louis Public Co
- Operator: 1986–2006: Birka Line; 2006–2007: Louis Hellenic Cruise Lines
- Port of registry: 1986–2006: Mariehamn, Finland; 2006: Valletta, Malta; 2006–2007: Piraeus, Greece
- Ordered: 16 April 1984
- Builder: Valmet, Vuosaari shipyard, Helsinki, Finland
- Cost: 350 million Finnish markka
- Yard number: 321
- Laid down: 1984; 42 years ago
- Launched: 20 October 1985; 41 years ago
- In service: April 1986; 40 years ago
- Out of service: 5 April 2007; 19 years ago
- Identification: Call sign: SVMC; IMO number: 8406731; MMSI: 256162000 MarineTraffic
- Fate: Ran aground and sank in 2007

General characteristics (as built)
- Type: Cruiseferry
- Tonnage: 21,484 GT; 2,412 DWT
- Length: 142.95 m (469 ft 0 in)
- Beam: 24.70 m (81 ft)
- Draught: 5.75 m (19 ft)
- Installed power: 4 × Wärtsilä-Vasa 12V32; combined 17652 kW
- Speed: 20 knots (37 km/h; 23 mph) (service); 22 knots (41 km/h; 25 mph) (maximum)
- Capacity: 1,500 passengers; 1,394 passenger berths; 80 cars

General characteristics (after 2006 refit)
- Type: Cruise ship
- Tonnage: 22,412 GT
- Capacity: 1,537 passengers; 1,537 passenger berths
- Notes: Otherwise same as built

Sea Diamond was a cruise ship operated by Louis Hellenic Cruise Lines. She was built in 1984 by Valmet, Finland for Birka Line as Birka Princess. The ship ran aground near the Greek island of Santorini 5 April 2007, and sank the next day leaving two passengers missing and presumed dead.

== History ==
Originally named Birka Princess, the ship was built by the Finnish state-owned company Valmet at its Vuosaari shipyard in Helsinki at a cost of 350 million Finnish markka (€58,9 million). She was delivered in 1986 and operated for Birka Line in the Baltic Sea cruiseferry market, sailing on 24-hour cruises between Stockholm in Sweden and Åland in Finland. Between 1990 and 2003 she also made longer cruises around the Baltic Sea during the summer season.

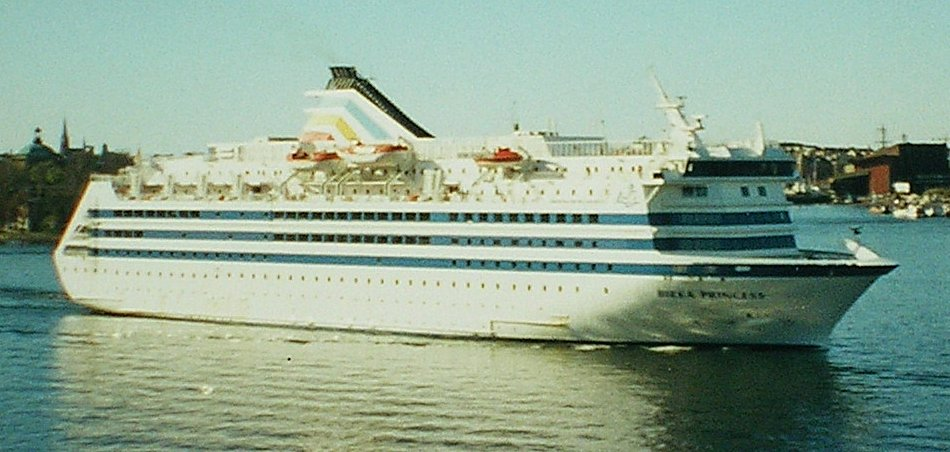
Birka Princess in her original exterior appearance and livery.

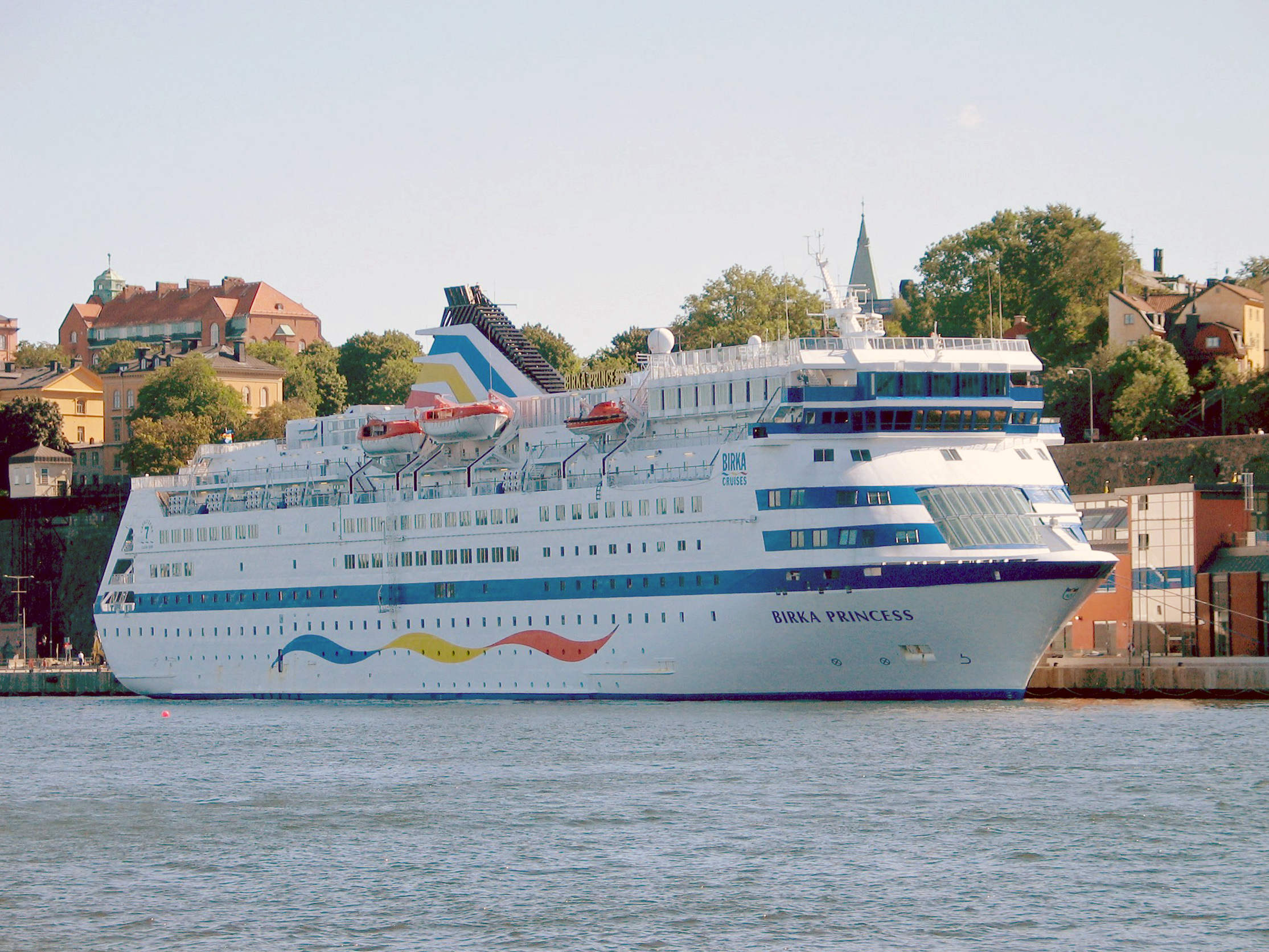
Birka Princess in Stockholm, 2005, displaying the changes made to the superstructure in the 1999 refit.

Between 1992 and 2002, the ship's exterior was used to portray the fictional ship Freja in the Swedish TV soap opera Rederiet.

As built, she had a small car deck, with space for 80 passenger cars and a ramp on the port side in the rear. Like most cruiseferries in the Baltic Sea, she was built to ice class 1A.

In 1999 she was extensively refitted at Lloyd Werft in Germany at a cost of approximately US$26 million. The fore superstructure was extended and streamlined and 62 new passenger cabins were added, including a new deck of cabins above the bridge. In October 2004, when the new Birka Paradise was delivered, the Birka Princess started making two-night cruises from Stockholm to Turku, Helsinki and Tallinn, as well one weekly 24-hour cruise from Stockholm to Mariehamn. The new itineraries proved largely unsuccessful, and on 2 January 2006, the ship was laid up in Mariehamn and put up for sale.

In February 2006 she was sold to the Cyprus-based Louis Cruise Lines for US$35 million (€29.4 million). As built, the ship only had an indoor pool in the sauna section on deck 2 in the bow of the ship. A new outdoor swimming pool was installed and the sundeck area increased at Turku Repair Yard, Naantali. She entered service in the Mediterranean Sea as the second former Birka Line ship in the Louis Cruise Lines fleet, after Princesa Marissa. After the sale she was registered in Valletta, Malta. She changed flags in late 2006. At the time of her sinking she was owned by Elona Maritime Ltd, a company based in Malta, but registered at Piraeus, Greece.

Artwork on the ship included two reliefs by ceramic artist Åsa Hellman.

== Sinking ==
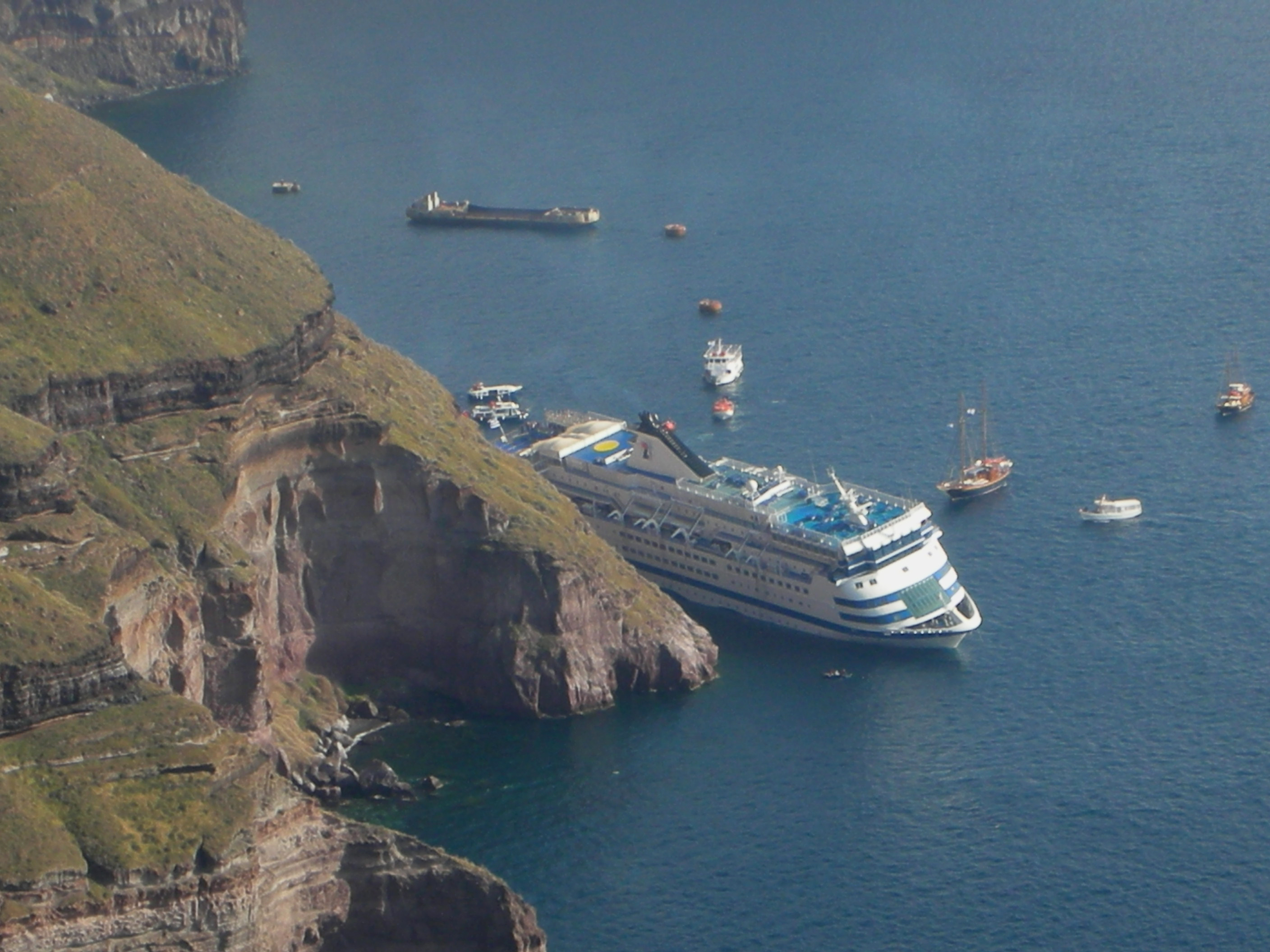
Attempts to prevent the stricken cruise ship from sinking

External videos
- Video of Sea Diamond sinking
- Another video of Sea Diamond sinking

On 5 April 2007, at around 16:00 EEST (13:00 UTC) the ship ran aground on a well-marked volcanic reef east of Nea Kameni, within the caldera of the Greek island of Santorini, began taking on water, and listed up to 12 degrees to starboard before her watertight doors were reportedly closed (a report which was later refuted when the wreck was examined). The 1,153 passengers, mostly Americans and 60 Canadians, were initially all reported to be safely evacuated in three-and-a-half hours, with four injuries. Some passengers, including a group of 77 students from Paisley Magnet School and students from Chapel Hill High School in North Carolina, were evacuated from the car ramp through the former car deck onto boats, but some passengers had to climb down rope ladders from the higher decks. The ship was towed off the rocks, and her list stabilised. Later, it was reported that two French passengers were missing.

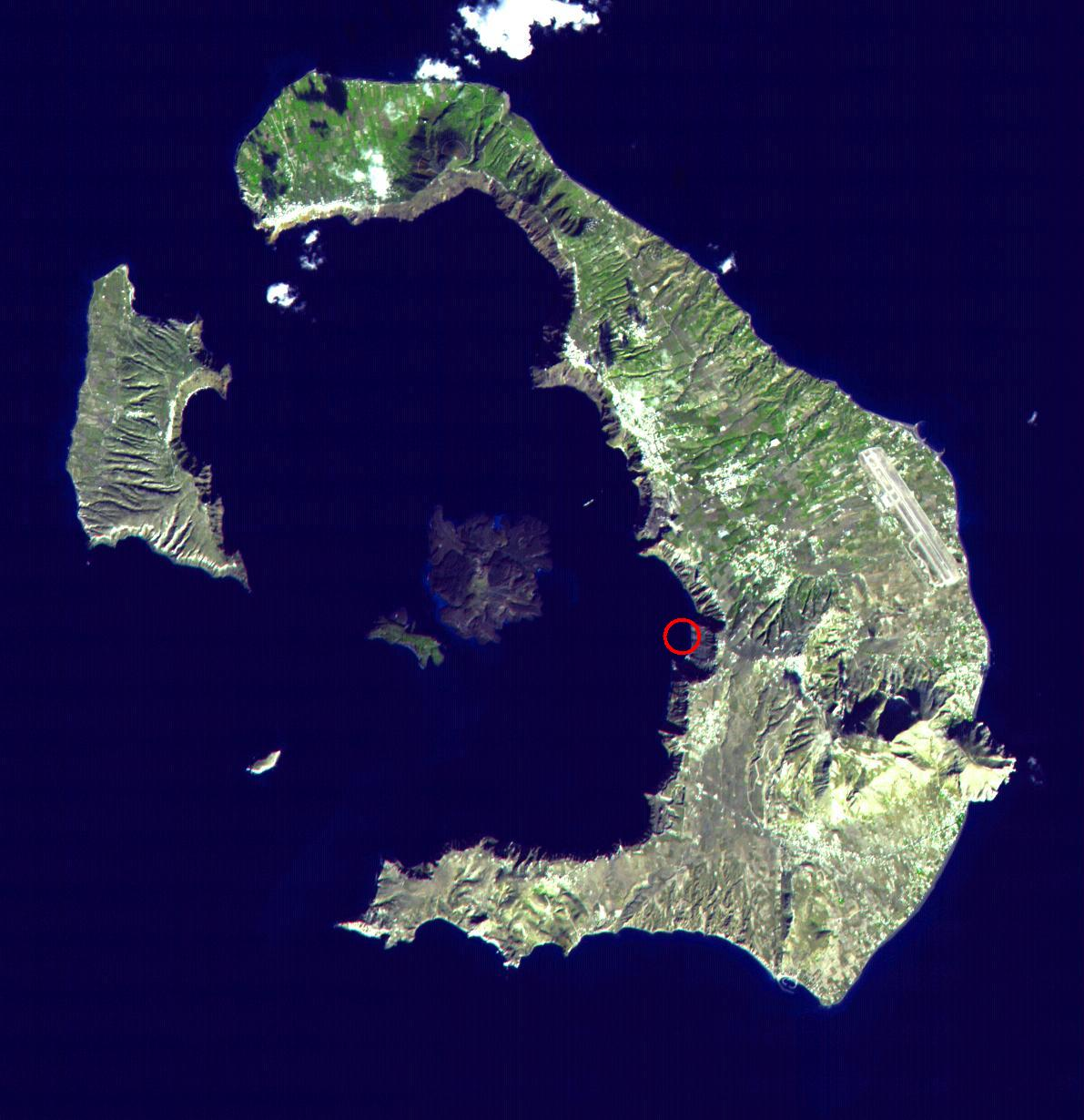
The Santorini caldera, the final resting place (marked) of Sea Diamond

The large amount of water taken on board led to the ship sinking shortly before 7:00 EEST on 6 April 2007, only a few hundred metres from the shore. Video footage shows that, toward the end, the ship completely capsized before settling stern first onto the sea floor. It was later reported that the tip of the bulbous bow was only 62 metres (203 feet) below sea level, but the stern was in water up to 180 metres (590 feet) deep. It is feared that the wreck would soon slide deeper and sink into the submerged caldera of the volcanic island. It has been speculated that the deep, almost vertical shore of the bathtub-like caldera made it impossible to beach the ship and save her from becoming a total loss.

=== Missing ===
Two French citizens, Jean Christophe Allain, aged 45, and his daughter Maud, 16, were listed as missing. Allain's wife said her cabin filled with water when the ship struck rocks and that she narrowly escaped. She was not sure whether her husband and daughter made it out, because the events happened so suddenly. Her son was on deck at the time and was evacuated safely. The family were accommodated in cabin 2014, an outside standard cabin on the starboard side of the vessel on deck 2, the lowest passenger deck.

Divers examined the wreck on 6 April to gather information on the ship's current position and to seek the missing passengers, but the search of the cabin recovered nothing. Divers continued searching on 10 April, but nothing was reported. Later in the same day, local governors apologized to the French family for their missing relatives. The black box containing the recordings of the conversations before the crash was discovered on 15 April, while the bodies of the two missing persons were never found.

=== Investigations ===
On 7 April, Greek authorities announced that they were charging the captain and five other officers with negligence. State television reported they were charged with causing a shipwreck through negligence, breaching international shipping safety regulations and polluting the environment. Additional charges could be made depending on the fate of the two missing passengers. All six were released until further notice but if convicted they could face a five-year prison sentence.

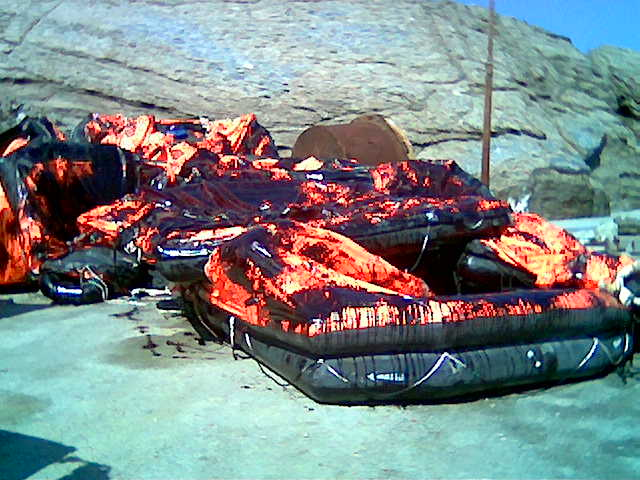
Empty life rafts automatically released in water, now covered with oil slicks from the Sea Diamond

On 13 April 2007, it was reported that investigators using a remotely controlled submarine found the ship's data recorder (VDR). In a struggle to protect the data, they secured it in a special sterilized bin and the authorities were to have transferred it to the United States in order to reveal the saved data, an action that only the manufacturer of the VDR can perform. The Greek Merchant Marine Ministry said the recorder could reveal details of the sinking of the ship which could be used in the prosecution of crew members.

DNV, one of the world's leading classification agencies, stated in their press release that "At the time of the accident, DNV had issued class certificate, safety management certificate and ship security certificate. Sea Diamond had no overdue surveys and no condition of class". For the Sea Diamond to have been issued a Class certificate, her water-tight doors would have to have been fully operational.

Investigations carried out by the defense team of the Master of the Vessel and Louis Cruise Lines, after a lawsuit had been filed against them, have included a new hydrographic survey of the area of the accident in Santorini. This survey was carried out by Akti Engineering, and discovered discrepancies between the actual mapping of the sea area and the official charts used by the Sea Diamond (and all other vessels) at the time of the accident. The detailed survey claimed that the reef, which the Sea Diamond struck is, in fact, lying at 131 metres (430 ft) from shore and not at a distance of 57 metres (187 ft), as is incorrectly marked on the nautical chart. The official chart also shows the depth of the water at the area of impact varying from 18–22 metres (59–72 ft), whilst the recent survey shows that it is only 5 metres (16 ft).

The findings obtained by Akti Engineering have since been passed on to the Hellenic Hydrographic Office of the Hellenic Navy and other responsible authorities, with the aim that the necessary changes to maritime charts should be made and similar accidents to be prevented. According to a branch reviewing source, the Hellenic Hydrographic Office initially rejected the new mapping, but a later study confirmed the findings of Akti.

A Greek scuba diver gathering evidence for a judicial investigation of the Sea Diamond shipwreck died in October 2007 from decompression sickness after ascending too quickly.

=== Aftermath ===
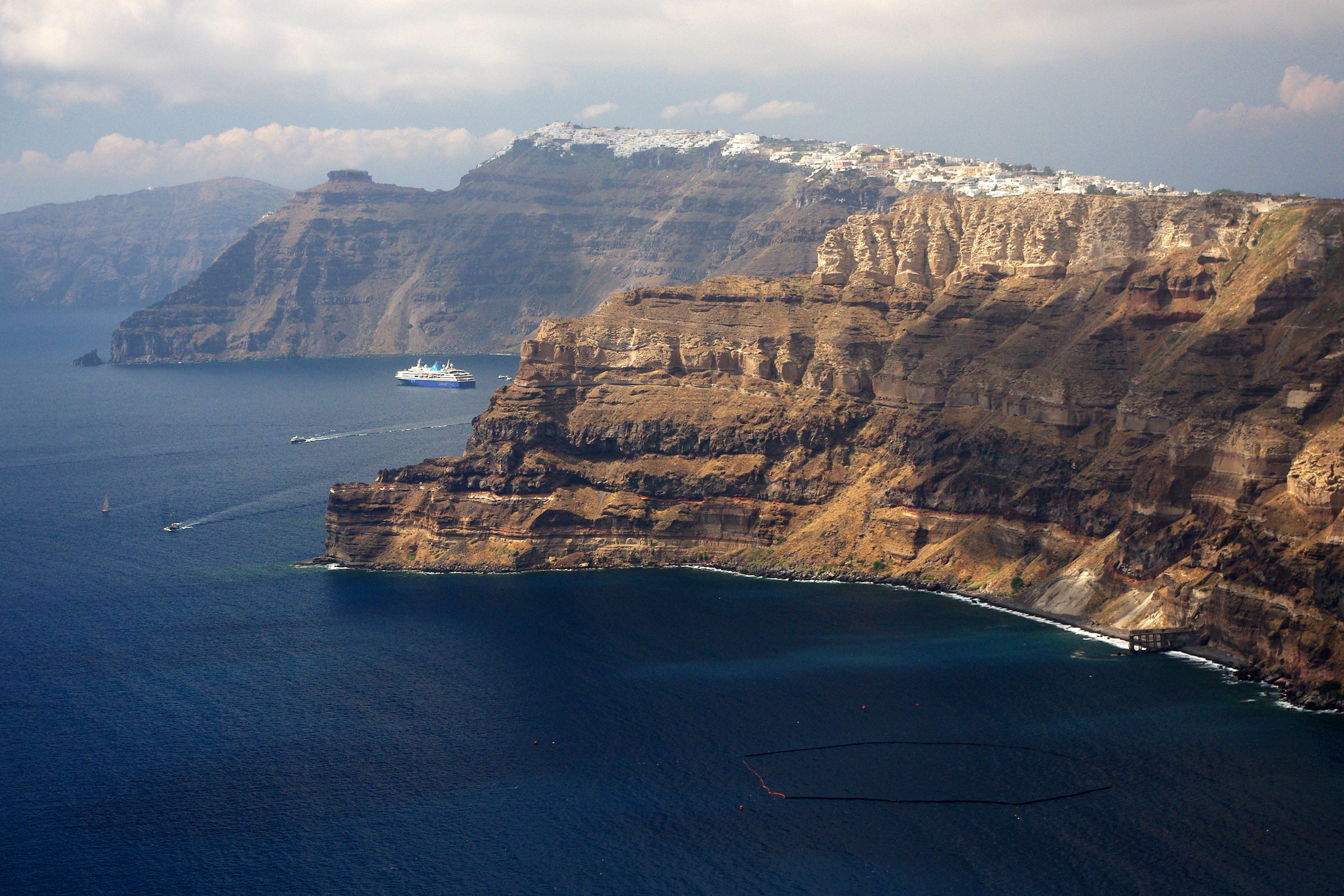
Oil spill containment booms over the wreck of Sea Diamond, 2015.

In order to avoid an oil spill, plans were made to recover some 450 tonnes (500 short tons) of fuel from the ship's tanks. As of 20 September 2007, fuel had started to leak into other parts of the ship, but not yet into the surrounding environment. In June 2009, some of the fuel was pumped off the wreck. In May 2007, it was announced that Louis Cruise Lines had bought Silja Opera, renaming it Cristalm to replace the Sea Diamond.

On 19 June 2007, the owners, operator and captain of the Sea Diamond cruise ship were fined €1.17 million for causing marine pollution.

On 21 August 2007, a lawsuit was filed in United States federal court on behalf of the passengers who were aboard the ship when she sank.

After six years in the courts, the Sea Diamond captain and a DNV insurance company employee were given 12- and 8-year jail sentences, respectively. The company had issued papers indicating that the ship was safe to sail. Other shipboard officers received lower sentences or were acquitted.

=== Raising ===
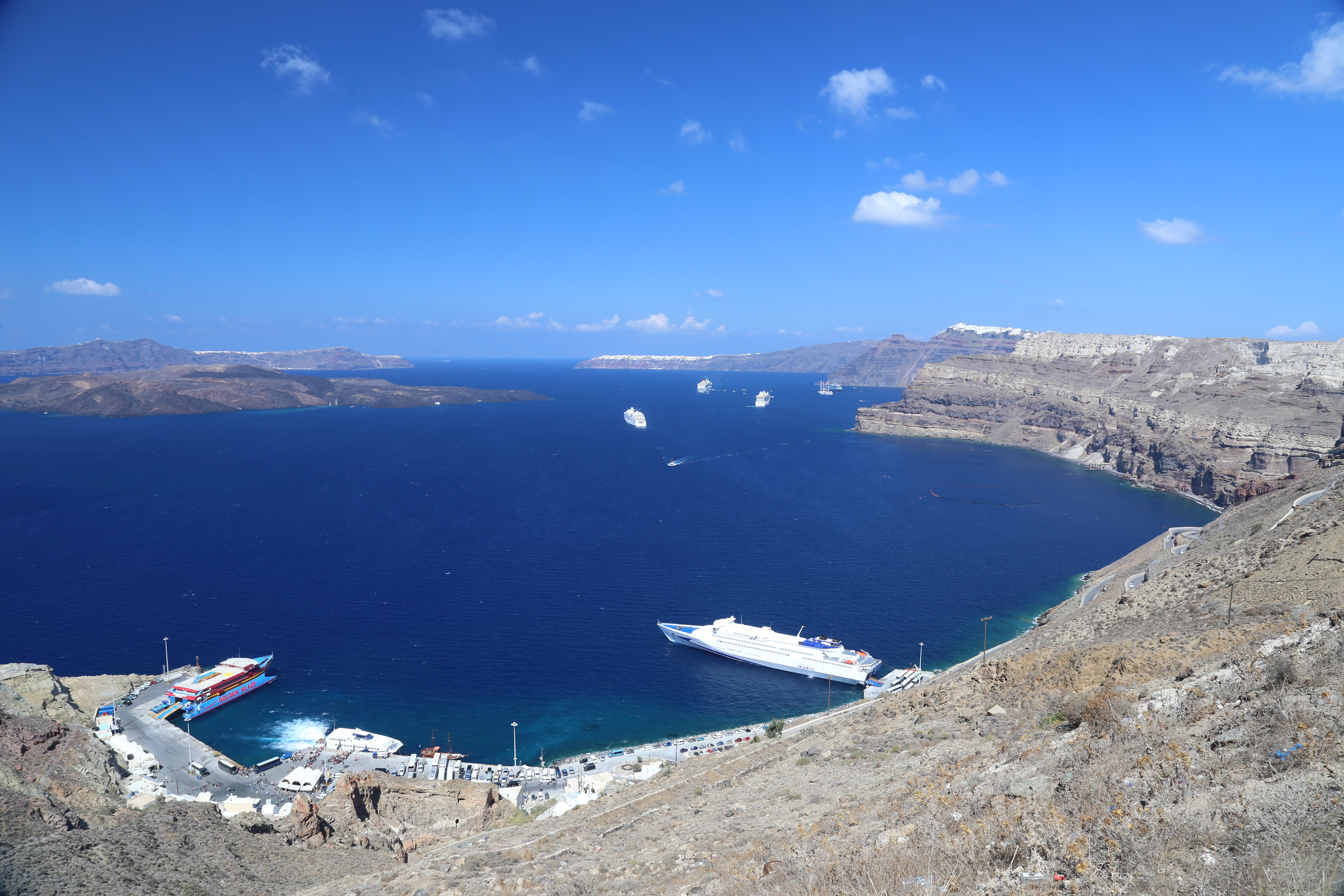
A view of the port of Athinios. On the right can be seen the fuel containment boom of the Sea Diamond.

After the sinking, there was much demand from the residents of Santorini for the wreck to be raised and removed. Further questions were posed but never answered as to why the ship was moved to deeper water to be allowed to sink in the first place. In May 2011, the Greek government claimed that removing the Sea Diamond would be "too costly" and said that the 150-million-euro cost of raising the ship should be the responsibility of the insurers and company that owned the ship. The latter two have no plans to raise the ship, however.

In October 2017 the Merchant Marine Ministry of Greece announced the wreck would be raised, out of environmental and navigational concerns. It is an artificial reef for now.

== See also ==
- Lists of ship and ferry disasters
- Lists of shipwrecks
- Costa Concordia, an Italian cruise ship which grounded and capsized in January 2012, killing at least 32 people
- SS Heraklion, a Greek car ferry which capsized and sank in the Aegean Sea in 1966.
- MS Mikhail Lermontov, a Soviet cruise ship which ran aground on well-charted rocks and subsequently sank in the Marlborough Sounds, New Zealand, in 1986 under similar circumstances to the Sea Diamond.
- Express Samina, a Greek car ferry which hit a pair of rocky islets and sank near the Cyclades island of Paros in 2000.
