= List of hospitals in Finland =

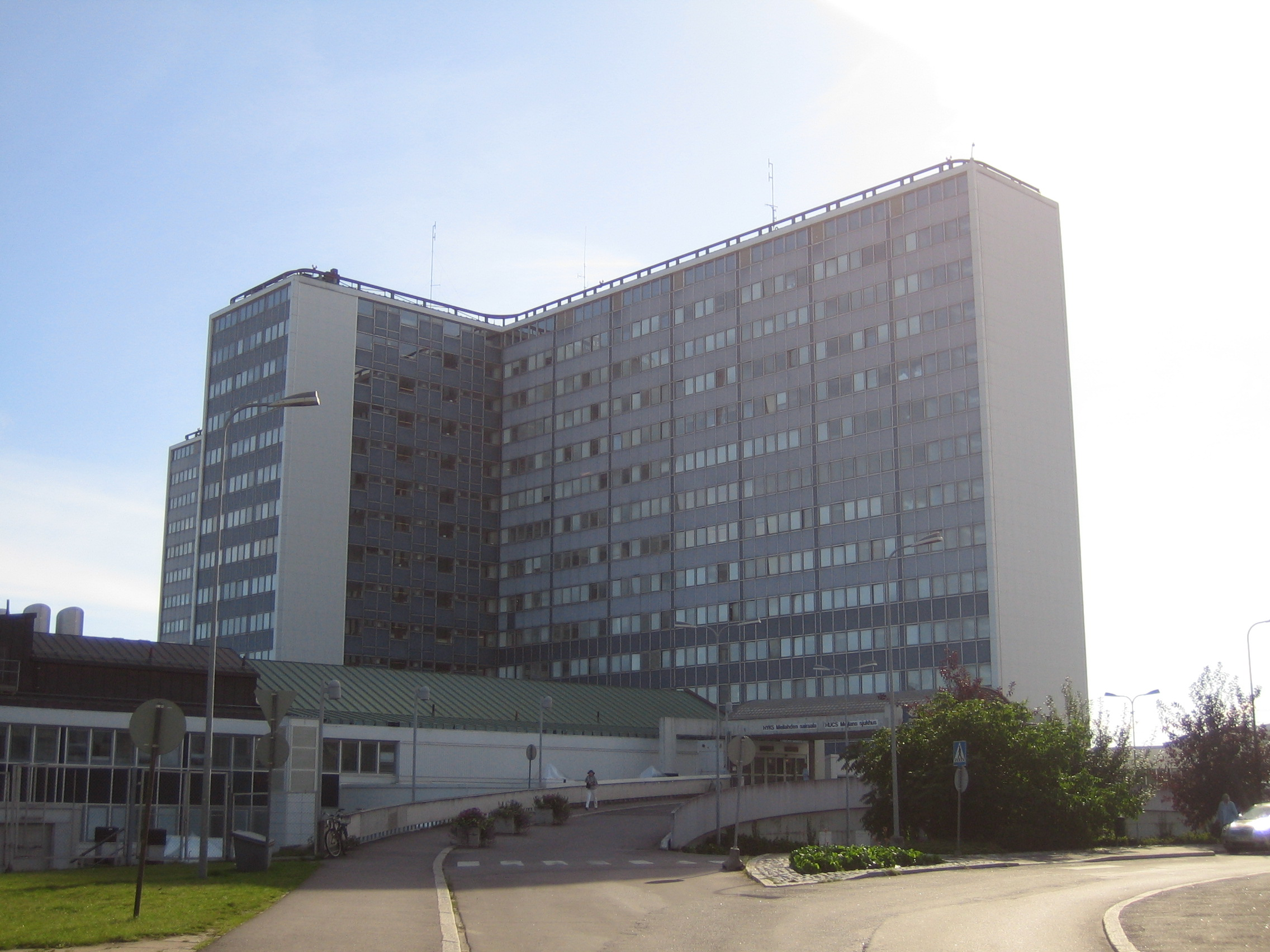
The Meilahti Hospital, part of the Helsinki University Central Hospital

This is a list of hospitals in Finland. The majority of the healthcare in Finland is offered by public service providers. The private sector is very small. Primary health care is offered in municipal health centers, whose services include physical examinations, oral health, medical care, ambulance services, maternity and child health clinics, school and student health care and other basic services. Specialized medical care, including outpatient and institutional treatment is provided by hospital districts. Diseases requiring highly demanding treatment are handled by regional arrangements or centrally according to a specific decree.

== University Hospitals ==
Each hospital district contains a central hospital and other specialised units. There are five university hospitals.

- Helsinki University Hospital, Helsinki
- Tampere University Hospital, Tampere
- Kuopio University Hospital, Kuopio
- Turku University Hospital, Turku
- Oulu University Hospital, Oulu

== Central Hospitals ==
- Kymenlaakso Central Hospital, Kotka
- South Karelia Central Hospital, Lappeenranta
- Päijät-Häme Central Hospital, Lahti
- Central Hospital of Tavastia, Hämeenlinna
- Satakunta Central Hospital, Pori
- Vaasa Central Hospital, Vaasa
- Southern Ostrobothnia Central Hospital, Seinäjoki
- Central Hospital of Keski-Pohjanmaa, Kokkola
- Central Finland Central Hospital, Jyväskylä
- Mikkeli Central Hospital, Mikkeli
- Central Hospital of Savonlinna, Savonlinna
- North Karelia Central Hospital, Joensuu
- Lapland Central Hospital, Rovaniemi
- Central Hospital of Kainuu, Kajaani
- Åland Central Hospital, Mariehamn, Åland
- Central Hospital of Länsi-Pohja, Kemi

== Regional Hospitals ==
=== Helsinki and Uusimaa Hospital District ===
Helsinki

- Aurora Hospital
- Children's Castle
- Children’s Hospital
- Department of Oncology
- Eye and Ear Hospital
- Haartman Hospital
- Herttoniemi Hospital
- Kätilöopisto Maternity Hospital
- Laakso Hospital
- Meilahti Tower Hospital
- Meilahti Triangle Hospital
- Psychiatrycenter
- Skin and Allergy Hospital
- Surgical Hospital
- Töölö Hospital
- Women's Hospital

Espoo and Vantaa

- Jorvi Hospital
- Peijas Hospital

Hospitals in the other municipalities

- Hyvinkää Hospital
- Kellokoski Hospital
- Lohja Hospital
- Länsi-Uusimaa Hospital
- Paloniemi Hospital
- Porvoo Hospital
- Tammiharju Hospital
- Women's Hospital

=== Hospital District of Southwest Finland ===
- Halikko Hospital, Halikko
- Loimaa Regional Hospital, Loimaa
- Salo Regional Hospital, Salo
- Vakka-Suomi Hospital, Uusikaupunki
- Åboland/Turunmaa Hospital, Turku

=== Hospital District of South Karelia ===
- Parikkala Regional Hospital, Parikkala
- Armila Hospital, Lappeenranta
- Honkaharju Hospital, Imatra

=== Hospital District of Päijänne-Tavastia ===
- Kuusankoski Hospital, Kuusankoski

=== Kymenlaakso Hospital District ===
- Kuusankoski Regional Hospital, Kouvola

=== Häme Hospital District ===
- Riihimäki Regional Hospital, Riihimäki
- Forssa Regional Hospital, Forssa

=== Satakunta Hospital District ===
- Harjavalta Hospital, Harjavalta
- Rauma Regional Hospital, Rauma
- Satalinna Hospital, Harjavalta

=== Vaasa Hospital District ===
- Bottenhavet Hospital, Kristinestad

=== Etelä-Pohjanmaa Hospital District ===
- Ähtäri Regional Hospital, Ähtäri

=== Central Finland Health Care District ===
- Kinkomaa Hospital, Jyväskylä
- Sädesairaala Hospital, Jyväskylä
- Juurikkaniemi Hospital, Keuruu
- Kangasvuori Hospital, Jyväskylä

=== Pirkanmaa Hospital District ===
- Kaivanto Hospital, Kangasala
- Mänttä Hospital, Mänttä
- Pitkäniemi Hospital, Nokia
- Vammala Regional Hospital, Sastamala
- Valkeakosken Regional Hospital, Valkeakoski

=== Etelä-Savo Hospital District ===
- Moisio Hospital, Mikkeli
- Pieksämäki Regional Hospital, Pieksämäki

=== North Karelia Hospital District ===
- Kotilahti Hospital, Joensuu

=== Hospital District of Northern Savonia ===
- Julkula Hospital, Kuopio
- Alava Hospital, Kuopio
- Tarina Hospital, Siilinjärvi
- Iisalmi Regional Hospital, Iisalmi

=== Northern Ostrobothnia Hospital District ===
- Oulaskangas Hospital, Oulainen
- Visala Hospital, Ylivieska

=== Lapland Hospital District ===
- Muurola Hospital, Rovaniemi

=== Länsi-Pohja Hospital District ===
- Keropudas Hospital, Tornio

=== Hospital District of Åland ===
- Grelsby sjukhus, Finström, Åland

== Private Hospitals ==
- Eira Hospital, Helsinki
- Diacor, Helsinki
- Docrates Cancer Center, Helsinki
- Pohjola Hospital (Orthopedics), Helsinki, Kuopio, Tampere, Turku, Oulu
- Pulssi, Turku
- Dextra, Helsinki
- Helsinki Hospital, Helsinki
- , Klinika Helena, Savonlinna
- , Terveystalo, Helsinki
- , Mehilainen, Helsinki
