= Myyrmanni bombing =

2002 bombing in Myyrmäki, Finland

Coordinates: 60°15′37″N 24°51′12″E

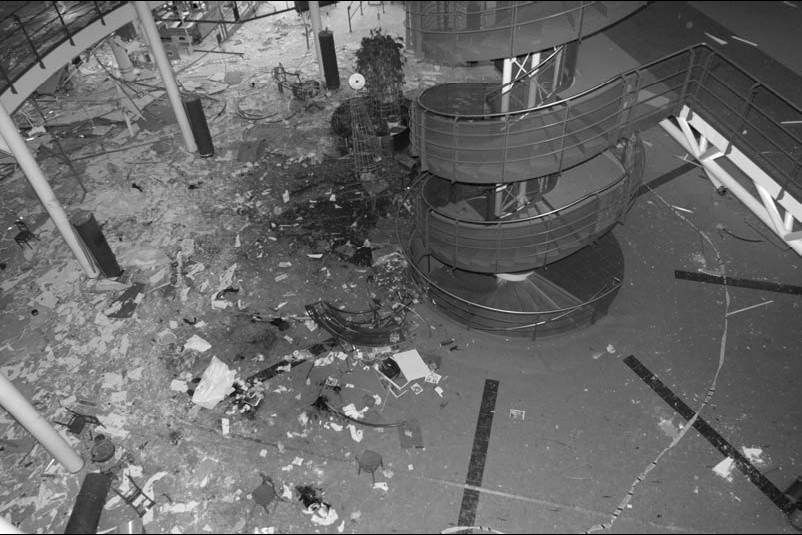
- Aftermath of the explosion
- Location: Vantaa, Finland
- Date: October 11, 2002
- Attack type: Suicide bombing, mass murder
- Weapon: Ammonium nitrate-based nail bomb
- Deaths: 7 (including the perpetrator)
- Injuries: 159
- Perpetrator: Petri Gerdt
- Motive: Unknown

The Myyrmanni bombing took place on October 11, 2002, in Myyrmäki, Vantaa, Finland, in Greater Helsinki, at the Myyrmanni shopping mall. A bomb hidden in a backpack exploded in the center of the mall, killing seven people including the bomber. The blast left a 10-cm deep crater in the floor and blew out the glass dome of the mall. The dead included two teenagers and a seven-year-old. 159 people were injured, including 10 children. 66 victims required hospitalization while the remainder were treated and released at the scene. The bombing took place during the pre-weekend shopping surge late on a Friday afternoon, with 1,000–2,000 people in the shopping center, including many children who had come to see a clown performance.

== Details ==
The bomb carrier was Petri Erkki Tapio Gerdt (April 17, 1983 – October 11, 2002), a 19-year-old chemical engineering student at the Espoo-Vantaa Institute of Technology (EVTEK). Described as quiet and somewhat withdrawn, Gerdt was an amateur bomb-maker with no known close friends. He participated in basketball and had no prior criminal record. Gerdt died in the explosion he caused. He was also an active member of Kotikemia (lit. "home chemistry"), an online forum for amateur chemists. The moderator of Kotikemia was acquitted of responsibility in court. The explosive device was likely constructed in Gerdt's apartment. It was a 1.5 liter plastic bottle that contained ammonium nitrate and nitromethane with shotgun pellets and weighed about 2–3 kilograms (4.4–6.6 lb). Investigations revealed that some kind of timer was also used. Kotikemia was shut down by the authorities following the bombing.

== Site ==
The site of the explosion was at the central square of the first floor of the Myyrmanni shopping centre about 45 metres from the southern entrance near the Iskostori square, next to a McDonald's restaurant, a Musta Pörssi store and a K-Citymarket grocery store. There was a twisting stairway at the site leading to the upper floors and down to the parking garage. The escalators leading to the second floor were also located nearby as well as the elevators. The explosion was so powerful that it broke the ceiling structure, which were damaged but did not collapse. The worst damage was to a relatively small area of about 400 square metres. Traces of the shotgun pellets in the bomb were found inside the shopping centre at a maximum distance of 70 metres from the site of the explosion, near the northern entrance next to the Paalutori square.

== Investigation ==
The Finnish National Bureau of Investigation investigated the event as six accounts of murder, one account of aggravated criminal mischief and one account of an explosives offence. The case was closed in January 2003 without any indictments as Gerdt was the sole suspect. Gerdt's motive for the bombing was not ascertained during the investigation. There was no evidence found that Gerdt had links to any outside groups or to any international terrorist organizations.

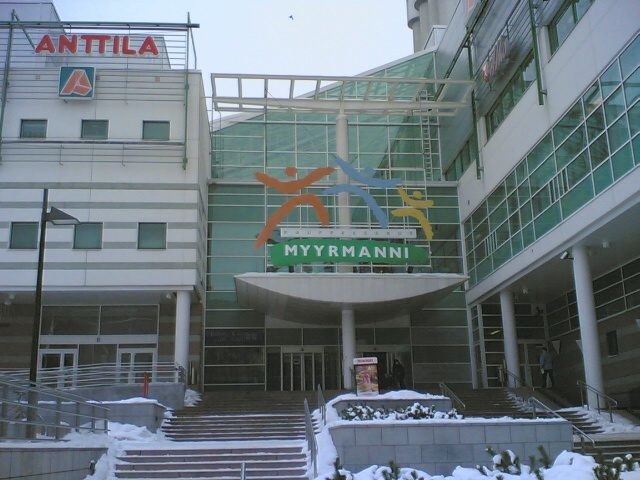
Myyrmanni

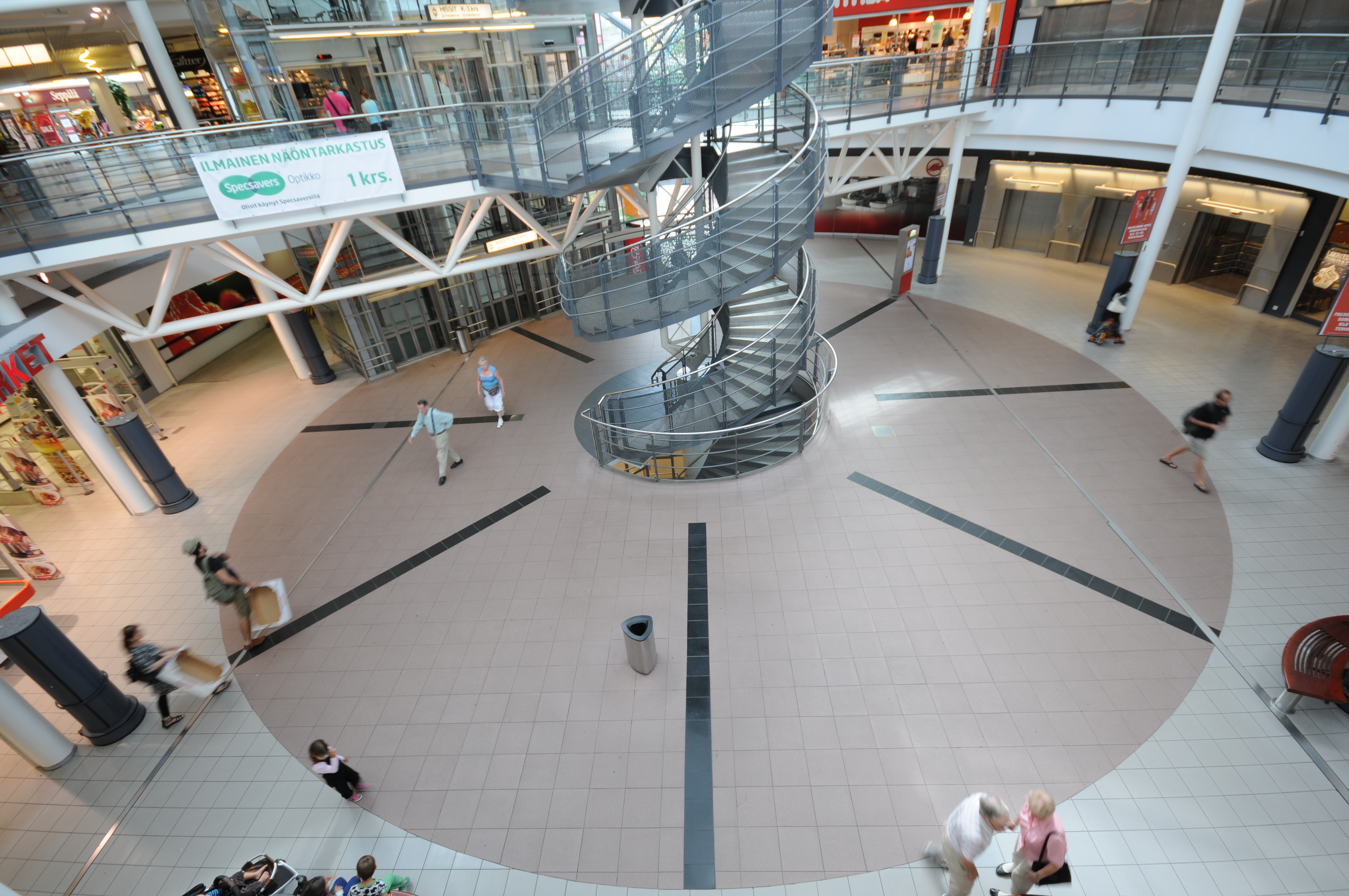
Myyrmanni (2011)

== Timeline ==
=== Friday 11 October ===
Gerdt's parents went to work at the morning as usual and didn't notice anything strange in their son's behaviour. Gerdt left home from Tikkurila in the morning before noon. He left his mobile phone powered off in a shelf, where it was later found by the police. He also left his computer powered on, on standby.

- 12:12: Gerdt boarded a bus on line 84 travelling between Tikkurila and Mellunmäki. The investigation did not find what he was doing and where he was going during the next four hours. There has been speculation that he had hidden parts of the bomb supplies in forests near Mellunmäki and also worked on his bomb. There are World War I era fortifications in Mellunmäki where it is easy to hide objects. Gerdt also possibly visited Itäkeskus or other places in Helsinki with the Helsinki Metro.
- 16:10: Gerdt boarded a bus on line 84K at the Mellunmäki metro station and returned to Tikkurila. He probably never returned home after this.
- 17:10: There was a confirmed sighting of Gerdt at Asematie in Tikkurila. An eyewitness saw Gerdt walk towards the Tikkurila railway station and the bus station next to it.
- 17:15: Gerdt boarded a bus on line 50 or a bus on line 55 at 17:18. Both of them travelled from Tikkurila to Myyrmäki.
- 18:00: Gerdt arrived at Myyrmäki. There are no confirmed records of his movements between 18:00 and 19:20.
- 19:00 to 19:20: There are eyewitness sightings of Gerdt at Myyrmanni and near it. He went to the public toilet on the second floor to work on his bomb. A ten-year-old boy saw him work on his bag and shotgun pellets from below the toilet stall door. The boy first thought the noise came from a belt buckle hitting the floor, but later realised it had been the shotgun pellets.
- 19:20: A security camera made the first confirmed recording of Gerdt at Myyrmanni. However the cameras did not record the site of the explosion.
- 19:30 to 19:35: There are unclear eyewitness sightings about Gerdt's movements. The bag containing the bomb was by his legs at this point. In front of the nearby McDonald's restaurant was a clown dealing out balloons, played by a volunteer employee of the Project Hope foundation. There were plenty of children watching the performance. According to criminal investigation, the bomb was on his lap when it exploded, about a metre above the floor, with Gerdt standing up at the time of the explosion.
- 19:35: The bomb exploded in Gerdt's lap, killing him instantly. Gerdt's body was flung out a distance of 15 metres and smashed against the window of an Intersport sports equipment store. As well as Gerdt, the bomb killed six people and wounded hundreds of others, some of them severely. The first emergency call was made at 19:36:49. Immediately after the explosion, the shops at Myyrmanni were closed and the intact survivors at the shopping centre were guided outside. There was no real panic at the shopping centre according to eyewitnesses.
- 19:38: The first emergency rescue units arrived at the scene. According to first information, the explosion was thought to have resulted from an exploded gas bottle at the clown performance. The first police patrol that arrived on the scene found Petri Gerdt's driving licence on the floor near the check-out counters at the Citymarket grocery store. The licence proved to be a conclusive clue and was sent to the Tikkurila police station and from there to the Finnish Central Criminal Police. A total of 59 wounded, of which eight were children, were transported by ambulance and Medi-Heli helicopter to the Töölö, Meilahti, Jorvi, Peijas and Hyvinkää hospitals as well as the Children's Clinic Hospital, and during the next four days 27 patients were operated in 49 operations.
- 20:04: The Finnish News Agency STT published the first news about the explosion at Myyrmanni. YLE made a special broadcast about the event.
- 20:50: The last wounded patients had been transferred to hospitals. Criminal investigators arrived at the scene. As the explosion hinted at terrorism, an investigator from the Finnish Security and Intelligence Service (SUPO) also visited the scene. Suspicion of a bomb strike awoke when steel pellets were found in the wounds of the patients transferred to hospitals.
- 21:00: Finnish authorities held the first public information event at Myyrmanni.
- 21:30: A critical aid point was opened at the Kilteri School near Myyrmanni.
- 22:00: A Kymmenen uutiset news broadcast made the first announcement that the event had been a bomb explosion. Confirmation of this reached the news just before the broadcast was made.
- 23:10: Rescue operations were ended. The case moved on to the police.

=== Saturday 12 October ===
- 01:30: The responsibility for the investigation moved from the Vantaa police to the National Bureau of Investigation.
- 03:00: The police announced they suspect the explosion had been a deliberate strike instead of an accident.
- 11:30: The Lipponen Cabinet held an emergency meeting about the event.
- After 12:00: Criminal investigators used a DNA investigation to find out the identity of the bomber. Directly after this the police performed a search at Gerdt's home in Tikkurila. The police confiscated Gerdt's computer, instructions for the bomb, shotgun pellets and chemicals needed for the bomb from his room. Gerdt's school and workplace were also searched.
- 13:00: A memorial service was held for the victims at the Myyrmäki Church. The service was attended by President of Finland Tarja Halonen and her husband Dr. Pentti Arajärvi, Prime Minister of Finland Paavo Lipponen, Interior Minister Ville Itälä, Minister of Basic Services Eva Biaudet and Minister of Culture Kaarina Dromberg.

=== Sunday 13 October ===
A radio and television news broadcast revealed that the perpetrator of the Myyrmanni bombing had been the 19-year-old chemical engineering student Petri Gerdt from Vantaa, who was also killed himself in the explosion.

=== Monday 14 October ===
Investigation of the event continued with technical investigations at the scene. The police reconstructed the event inside Myyrmanni, trying to find the precise location of the bomb at the time of the explosion. On the same day, the National Bureau of Investigation published a computer-generated image of a shop window dummy with Petri Gerdt's face. The dummy had been dressed in similar clothes as Gerdt had been wearing at the time of the explosion. The bureau hoped to gain more information about Gerdt's movements before the explosion with this image. The image led to much better clues, and Gerdt's movements could be tracked as far back as the previous Thursday.

The flag at the Espoo-Vantaa Technical University of Applied Sciences next to Myyrmanni was lowered to half-staff and there was a moment of silence at the school. The Ministry of the Interior suggested a global half-mast day on Tuesday 15 October throughout the country.

=== Later events ===
During the next week the police arrested four youths who had been discussing explosives at the same Internet forums as Gerdt, and their homes were also searched. One of the arrested was a 17-year-old high school student from Hämeenlinna who was using the nickname "Einstein". The police investigated whether he had been taken part in constructing the bomb, in which case he would have been guilty of assistance to a severe act of destruction. In June 2003 the boy using the nickname "Einstein" and two other boys were sentenced to fines for crimes related to explosives, which apparently had no connection to the Myyrmanni bombing.

== Aftermath ==
On October 15, 2002, Finland observed a national day of mourning in response to the tragic events. Government buildings were closed, a moment of silence was observed in Parliament, and flags across the country were flown at half-staff to honor the victims. The shopping center was closed for repairs for nearly three weeks before re-opening later in October.

The bombing was especially shocking for Finland and the other Nordic countries, where these types of attacks are extremely rare.

== Perpetrator ==
The perpetrator Petri Gerdt was described as a quiet, lonely, isolating and nice person who took others into account and appreciated others. He was never diagnosed with any psychiatric disturbance. His father Armas Gerdt said his son was a delicate character who as a child cried over even a small fall or discipline action and who often got his way. Armas Gerdt described his son as somewhat childish.

Petri Gerdt apparently never had a relationship or a large circle of friends. He never got any friends even through his hobby of playing basketball which he excelled in and was once awarded the "most valuable player" prize. Gerdt was very lonely and many of his contacts were over the Internet. Very few people of Gerdt's age visited him at home, except sometimes to play video games on the family's computer, which not very many families owned at the time. These visits stopped when Gerdt was ten years old.

Gerdt spent a lot of time in his room and on the family computer. Most of his other time he was at school or at basketball practice. "When Petri was not at school or at basketball practice, he was at home", describes Gerdt's father. On 11 October 2002 Gerdt didn't return home in the evening, which was unusual. On Saturday evening 12 October 2002 the family had wondered where he might be: "And he (Petri) couldn't even have stayed overnight at anyone's home, because he had no friends", describes Gerdt's father.

=== History ===
Petri Erkki-Tapio Gerdt was born as the first child of the family. When Gerdt was one year old, the family moved to Tikkurila to a detached house. There were hardly any families with children in the area that would have had children of Gerdt's age, so Gerdt was left alone in this regard. Later he was reluctant to go outside alone any more. His only good friend of his own level was his little sister. "When his sister was at home, Petri had a friend", his father said.

At school Petri was bullied a lot, even though he denied this when asked. "His father sometimes asked about it, but the son was proud and never admitted it", said Gerdt's father. The bullying was at its worst on the upper stage of primary school, where no one stepped against it. The bullying manifested as leaving Gerdt out of groups and group works. Reasons for the bullying included Gerdt's strange way of walking and his achievements in physical exercise (for example skating and skiing). He was possibly also bullied in secondary school. As Gerdt was considerably tall (187 cm) the bullying was mostly mental rather than physical.

Gerdt did well at school in spite of the bullying. He was greatly interested in nature, which is evident from his good scores at the national Metsävisa nature quiz, where he got an honorary mention.

Gerdt's scores at his matriculation exam were worse than what he had expected, which could possibly have depressed him even further. He was admitted to study at EVTEK, even though he would have preferred to go to the university. During summer he worked at a supermarket called Hong Kong. He even wanted to work on weekends and could work for several weeks without taking break days. He was well liked at work and performed well at customer service. "In summer his parents had visited his workplace to see how we managed at grown-up work. He seemed to do well", said Gerdt's father.

== Theories about reason ==
The reason for the explosion and Gerdt's motive have not been established. There is no clear evidence that Gerdt would have wanted to harm other people or himself. Gerdt never expressed having thoughts about self-harm or harm to others, and criminal investigation found that he had no intent to die in the explosion. The bomb was possibly meant to explode at Myyrmanni, but there is no evidence whether this was meant to be while the shopping centre was still open or after closing time. The bomb had a timer.

=== Accident ===
The theory of an accident has been proposed particularly by Petri Gerdt's father Armas Gerdt. In his book Petrin matka Myyrmanniin, he suspects that Petri was carrying the bomb through Myyrmanni so he could explode it in a nearby forest, and the bomb exploded in Myyrmanni by accident. There might have been people at the intended detonation site so Petri Gerdt would have been waiting for a better moment to explode the bomb. He had been experimenting with smaller bombs in a similar manner. The self-made explosives were very unstable and could have exploded without any prior warning. However, Petri Gerdt's bomb exploded at a central site at Myyrmanni and had been lined with six thousand steel pellets. Also the sun had already set an hour ago at the time of the explosion (the sun set at 18:26).

=== Suicide strike ===
According to one theory, the bomb was a suicide strike. Gerdt wanted to die in the explosion and kill as many other people as possible. Evidence against this theory include the lack of a suicide note and the chosen time of the explosion, an hour before closing time. According to police investigation, Gerdt had not expressed being a supporter of any political or religious extreme ideology. Suicide strikes are often made to gain publicity. The perpetrator of a suicide strike wants to express some kind of ideological or political decision why they committed the strike. However, the theory of a suicide strike or an accident is somewhat supported by Gerdt's writing on the Internet. In one writing he describes: "I have not had any major accidents, but once I had a dream that a police car drove to the scene of the explosion. Luckily I was already 'floating' in another direction." According to Gerdt's father, "floating" was Petri Gerdt's term for running.

=== Deliberate bomb strike where Gerdt died accidentally himself ===
According to this theory, Gerdt had intended to leave the bomb in a waste basket or on top of it at Myyrmanni. He left the site of the bomb in order to explode it either with a remote control or with a timer. For some reason the bomb had not exploded, and Gerdt returned to the site to investigate it, when the bomb exploded, killing its manufacturer. Evidence against this theory includes the lack of any motive and some matters found during criminal investigation. Politics was of no interest to Gerdt, and there was no evidence of any exceptional ideological or political desires unusual in a young man in his behaviour or in his writings. He was interested in bombs and their destructive effects. Gerdt had also read Che Guevara's biography (which he didn't finish). The possibility of a deliberate but failed bomb strike has been almost completely closed out in the police investigation.

== Bomb ==
Tero Haapala from the National Bureau of Investigation said in an MTV interview that the bomb at Myyrmanni had been "extremely dirty" and that it had been easy to take to Myyrmanni without anyone noticing.

The bomb that Gerdt had used was a two-litre lemonade bottle he had stuffed into his old school bag, containing an explosive called ANNM. Except for the pellets, the bomb had weighed two to three kilograms and had cost about 150 to 180 euros, and it had contained about six thousand steel pellets. According to the police, Gerdt might have been carrying the bomb in his bag for the whole time he was travelling throughout Vantaa and Helsinki on the afternoon prior to the bombing. It is also possible that Gerdt had been storing the bomb somewhere in Myyrmäki where he was studying and then picked it up before going to Myyrmanni.

The starter charge of the bomb was possibly a peroxide-based charge such as HMTD, which is an unstable explosive and reacts to metals. Gerdt had previously written on the Kotikemia forum about the ANNM charge and the HMTD starter charge. In early September 2002 he had written that he had exploded an HTMD charge in a box of cough pastilles and that the explosion had been "big as hell".

Gerdt had been an active participant on the Kotikemia forum with the nickname "rc" and had been interested in building bombs as a hobby. Before the Finnish forum he had been reading discussions on foreign sites. The forum had had discussions about explosives, but according to the police, no one had been incited to crime. Later the court dismissed the charges against the administrator of the forum, a 17-year-old youth from Hämeenlinna with the nickname "Einstein". The forum was closed soon after the explosion.

== Reactions ==
The event was especially shocking in Finland and the Nordic countries where explosions claiming human lives are extremely rare. Most Finnish and foreign politicians, such as President of Finland Tarja Halonen, Prime Minister of Finland Paavo Lipponen and Prime Minister of Sweden Göran Persson expressed their condolences to the victims and the wounded in the explosion. Minister of Domestic Affairs Ville Itälä described the event as "a criminal and condemnable act". According to him the event had been the biggest civilian tragedy in the Helsinki capital region after World War II. For the weekend, the Myyrmanni explosion was the main news item throughout Europe. After the event, security operations were temporarily tightened in all shopping centres in Finland.

Many postcards and candles were taken to the northern entrance to Myyrmanni on the Paalutori square. A fund was also developed to help the victims and their families.

A memorial service for the victims was held at the Myyrmäki Church a couple of days after the event. The material damages to the Myyrmanni shopping centre were massive. The shopping centre had to be closed because of the extensive damage and was reopened on 30 October 2002, almost three weeks after the explosion. The aftercare for the explosion has later been discussed in public. Some of the wounded have said they had been left without proper support from the community.

In January 2003, many private persons and companies said they would demand compensation for the explosion. Almost all people seeking hospital care said they would demand compensation for their wounds or mental suffering, and over one hundred companies demanded compensation for property damages. Because the perpetrator was dead, the compensation had to be paid by the Finnish State Treasury and insurance companies.

The Ministry of the Interior placed an investigator group to investigate the explosion and the rescue operations after it. The group published their final report on 10 March 2003, and according to it, the authorities had mostly acted laudably. The rescue operations had been affected by the fact that the explosion had occurred indoors, good traffic connections and the location of Myyrmanni next to a healthcare centre. On the other hand, the telephone network had overloaded, which had hindered the internal communication between the authorities.

Petri Gerdt's father, Armas, wrote the book Petrin matka Myyrmanniin (Petri's Road to Myyrmanni) about the incident. The book was published a couple of years after the incident. It describes the events leading to the explosion. The reason for the publication was not an intent for defense, even though it describes school bullying, loneliness, isolation and the entire family's sorrow and the inability to imagine the entire event.
