= North Karelia Central Hospital =

- Hospital District of Northern Karelia
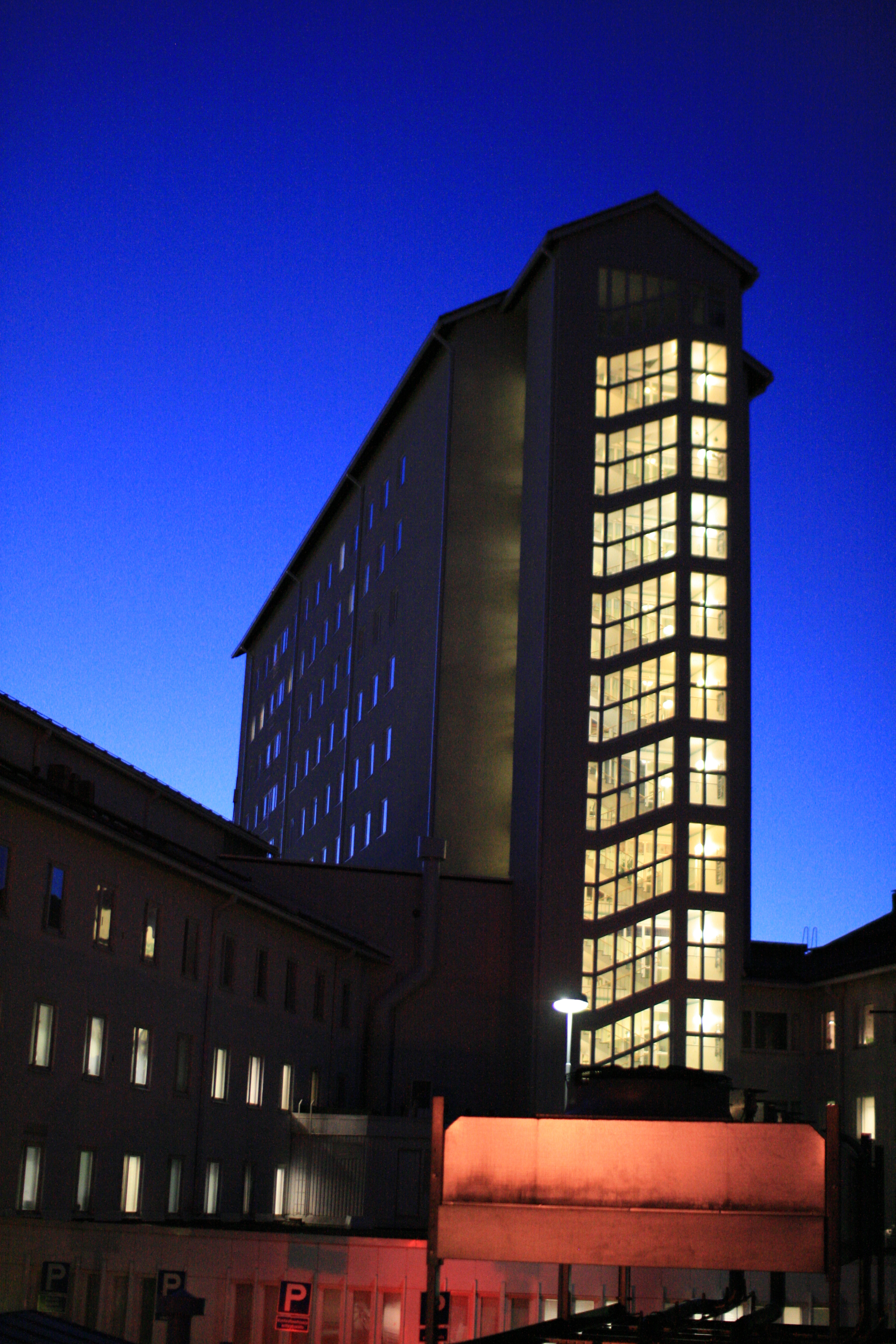
- Central Hospital Building in March 2014

Geography
- Location: Tikkamäentie 16, Joensuu, Joensuu, Finland
- Coordinates: 62°35′28.0″N 29°46′45.1″E

Helipads
- Helipad: (ICAO: EFJE)

History
- Founded: 1953

Links
- Website: www.siunsote.fi
- Lists: Hospitals in Finland

The North Karelia Central Hospital (Finnish: Pohjois-Karjalan keskussairaala) is a hospital located in the city of Joensuu in North Karelia, Finland. It was built in 1953, which makes it the oldest central hospital in the whole country. The hospital is located near the city center of Joensuu on the top of Niinivaara, from where its white main building can be seen tens of kilometers all the way to Koli. The height of the 12-storey building is 45 meters. Architects Jussi Paatela together with Olli Pöyry and Marja Pöyry were responsible for the design of the hospital buildings.

In North Karelia, the hospital provides special medical services to a total of 166,400 inhabitants in 13 municipalities. The hospital also has a helipad (ICAO: EFJE) for patient transport.

The North Karelia Hospital District is under the special responsibility of Kuopio University Hospital. Part of the specialist care is provided in the area of special responsibility at the university hospital in the area. The North Karelia Central Hospital does not have open heart surgery and neurosurgery; by decree of the Finnish Government, for example, organ transplants are centralized throughout the country at Helsinki University Central Hospital and hyperbaric oxygen treatment at Turku University Hospital.

The hospital serves as a teaching hospital for social and health care and medical students.
