= Haartman Hospital =

Hospital in Helsinki, Finland

Coordinates: 60°11′22.56″N 24°54′27.72″E

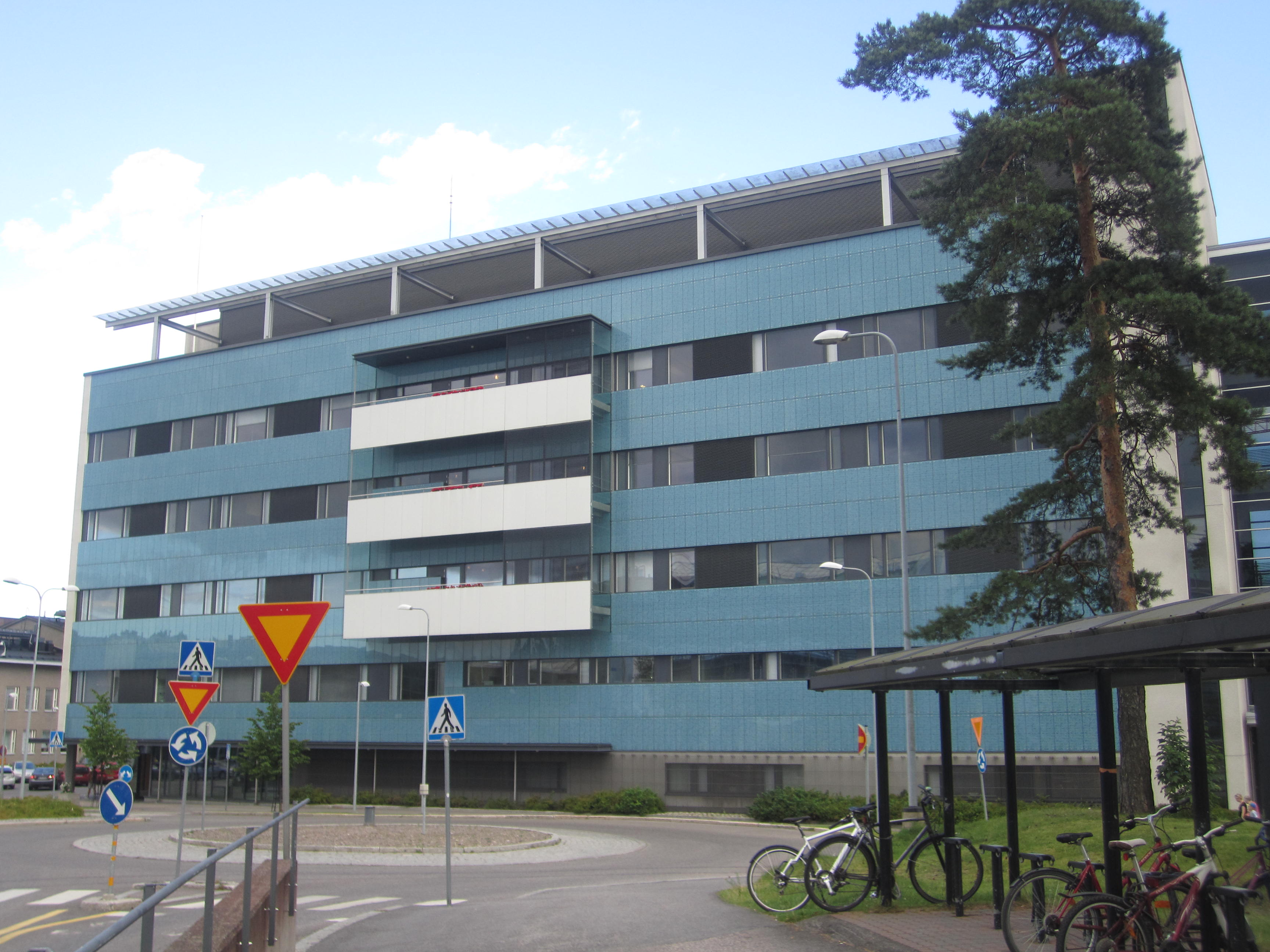
The Haartman Hospital

The Haartman Hospital (Finnish: Haartmanin sairaala) is a hospital at the Meilahti Tower Hospital area in Meilahti, Helsinki, Finland. The hospital started operating in autumn 2009. The hospital was named after the physician Johan Haartman, who founded the first hospital in Finland in Turku in 1799 and is considered the father of Finnish medicine.

== Architecture and fittings ==
The building was designed by the Finnish architecture bureau Virta-Palaste-Leinonen Arkkitehdit. The facades are made of screen printed glass with a blue pattern designed by the artist Markku Keränen (born 1945) in the background. The light chasms on the third floor bear sculptures by the Finnish artist Kirsi Kaulanen (born 1969). The light chasms bring light into the central patient spaces and also work as vehicles for smoke removal. The second floor, serving as the entrance floor, holds a patient registering space completely made of glass and completely insulated for sound, the first one in Finland and one of the few in the entire world at the time of construction.

== Services ==
The hospital hosts the following activities:

- outpatient department for women's diseases
- appointment outpatient department for cardiology
- emergency duty department
- three departments for internal organ diseases
- X-ray

The Meilahti common emergency duty department moved to the Siltasairaala ("Bridge Hospital") hospital on 8 January 2024, with an entrance on Paciuksenkatu 3. The department handles sudden diseases and injuries for people over 16 years of age as well as mental health problems requiring urgent care.

== See also ==
- List of hospitals in Finland
