= Helsinki Surgical Hospital =

Hospital in Helsinki, Finland

Coordinates: 60°9′42″N 24°56′55.8″E

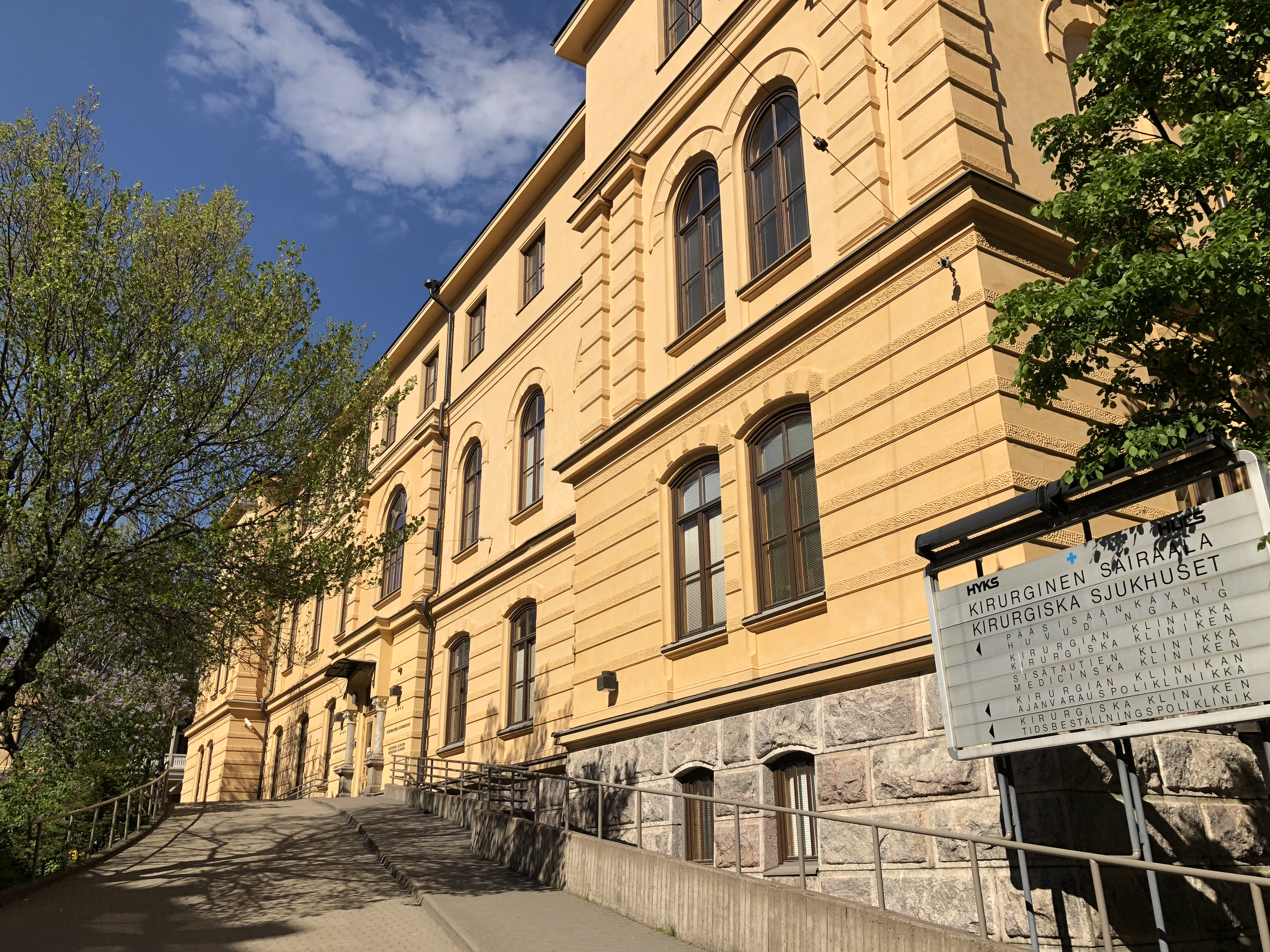
The Helsinki Surgical Hospital in 2018.

The Helsinki Surgical Hospital (Finnish: Kirurginen sairaala, Swedish: Kirurgiska sjukhuset), often referred to as Kirurgi (Swedish: Kirurgen) or simply Kirra, is a hospital located in Helsinki, Finland, in the district of Ullanlinna along the street Kasarmikatu near the Tähtitorninmäki park. The hospital was built in 1888 and represents neoclassical architecture typical of the late 19th century. The hospital is part of the Helsinki University Central Hospital.

Because of a great demand for a new hospital, the city of Helsinki donated the lot for construction of the hospital free of charge. The first designs for a new hospital were made by Hampus Dalström in the middle 1870s. However, the doctors were not satisfied with them, so the Senate of Finland held an architectural contest in 1877, which was won by the Swiss Sigismund Rangier. The designs of Ludwig Bohnstedt and Ernst Jacobsson were also accepted. The construction board did not think any of the designs was fit for construction on its own, so the board started combining elements from various designs led by Hampus Dalström and Frans Sjöström. After Sjöström's death, Helge Rancken took over from him, and the final designs in Sjöström's name were finished in 1885. Construction of the hospital started in 1886 and was completed in 1888.

The hospital has later been expanded with additional buildings, for example an emergency duty department built in 1973, designed by Eija and Olli Saijonmaa. It was equipped with a helicopter landing pad.

Emergency duty activity in the hospital stopped in 1994 and the helicopter landing pad was dismantled during renovation in 2010. Emergency duty activity in the hospital was reinstarted in 2015, when the policlinic for ear, nose and throat diseases moved there from the Helsinki Eye and Ear Hospital.

Currently the hospital hosts the Ear Clinic except for the Phoniatrics Clinic, which remains at the Helsinki Eye and Ear Hospital in the Meilahti Hospital.

The name Kirurgi (Swedish: Kirurgen) is also used for the terminus of the Helsinki tram line 10 located near the hospital.

In April 2020 HUCS concentrated treatment of the COVID-19 pandemic to the Surgical Hospital and opened a new inpatient wing for COVID-19 patients. The hospital also hosted an intensive care unit for the treatment of COVID-19 patients. The COVID-19 care department was closed down in May 2021 as the number of patients decreased. Discussion about reopening the COVID-19 care departments started in December 2021 as the number of patients started increasing again.

== See also ==
- List of hospitals in Finland
