= Hernesniemi =

Hernesniemi is a Finnish surname. Notable people with the surname include:

- Juha Hernesniemi (1947–2023), Finnish neurosurgeon and professor
- Sanna Hernesniemi (born 1971), Finnish sprinter
