= Juha Hernesniemi =

Finnish neurosurgeon (1947–2023)

- Born: October 18, 1947; Kannus, Finland
- Died: June 25, 2023 (aged 75); Helsinki, Finland
- Education: University of Zurich (MD, 1973); University of Helsinki (D.Med.Sci., 1979; doctoral dissertation: An analysis of outcome for head-injured patients with poor prognosis)
- Medical career
- Profession: Neurosurgeon
- Field: Neurosurgery
- Institutions: Helsinki University Hospital; University of Helsinki
- Sub-specialties: Cerebrovascular surgery (aneurysms, AVMs)
- Awards: Risto Pelkonen Prize (2007); Mensa Prize (2011); Konrad ReijoWaara Prize (2015)

Juha Antero Hernesniemi (18 October 1947 – 25 June 2023) was a Finnish neurosurgeon and academic, whose clinical work focused on the microsurgical treatment of intracranial aneurysms and arteriovenous malformations (AVMs). He served as chair of neurosurgery at Helsinki University Hospital (HUS) and as professor at the University of Helsinki from 1997 to 2015.

== Early life ==
Hernesniemi was born in Kannus, Finland. He studied medicine at the University of Zurich, receiving his MD in 1973, and later earned the degree of Doctor of Medical Science at the University of Helsinki in 1979. His dissertation was titled An analysis of outcome for head-injured patients with poor prognosis. During his time in Zurich, he was influenced by Professor Mahmut Gazi Yaşargil.

== Career ==
After positions in Helsinki, Kuopio and Uppsala (1979–1983), Hernesniemi served as assistant chief physician (1983–1991) and chief physician (1991–1997) at the Department of Neurosurgery at Kuopio University Hospital; he spent 1992–1993 as a research and teaching fellow at the University of Miami. In 1997 he was appointed chair of neurosurgery at HUS (Töölö), serving until he retired from his post in 2015. Contemporary Finnish sources reported that he performed approximately 400–500 operations annually at HUS.

=== International career ===
After retiring in Finland at the statutory age of 68, Hernesniemi continued to work abroad as a visiting professor and surgeon, including in Peru, Indonesia, Nepal and the United States. He later served as unit director and neurosurgeon at the Henan Provincial People’s Hospital in Zhengzhou, China. In 2022 he stated that pandemic restrictions and the war in Ukraine had interrupted his operative work for over a year.

== Research and clinical work ==
Hernesniemi’s work focused on the microsurgical management of cerebrovascular disease, especially aneurysms and AVMs. Finnish media reported that during his career he participated in the care of more than 70,000 neurosurgical patients and personally performed over 16,000 operations. His educational contributions included the handbook Helsinki Microneurosurgery: Basics and Tricks and the open-access surgical video collection 1001 Hernesniemi Videos.

== Awards and recognition ==
- Risto Pelkonen Prize (2007), awarded at the Tampere Medical Days.
- Mensa Prize (2011), awarded by Mensa Finland.
- Konrad ReijoWaara Prize (2015), awarded by the Finnish Medical Society Duodecim.

== Death ==
Hernesniemi died in Helsinki on 25 June 2023, aged 75.

== Selected works ==
=== Medical and educational works ===
- "1001 Hernesniemi Videos". Surgical Neurology International. 13 February 2016.
- Lehecka, Martin; Laakso, Aki; Hernesniemi, Juha (2011). "Helsinki Microneurosurgery: Basics and Tricks" (PDF). Helsinki Microneurosurgery Series (Booklet) (1st ed.). Helsinki, Finland: Department of Neurosurgery, Helsinki University Central Hospital. ISBN 978-952-92-9085-7. Archived from the original (PDF) on 9 March 2016.
- Hernesniemi, Juha (1979). An analysis of outcome for head-injured patients with poor prognosis (Doctoral dissertation). Helsinki: University of Helsinki. ISBN 951-99225-1-2.

=== Memoir ===
- Hernesniemi, Juha (2022). Aivokirurgin muistelmat [A Brain Surgeon's Memoirs] (in Finnish). WSOY. ISBN 9789510461785.
