= Vaasa Central Hospital =

Hospital in Vaasa, Finland

- Ostrobothnia wellbeing services county
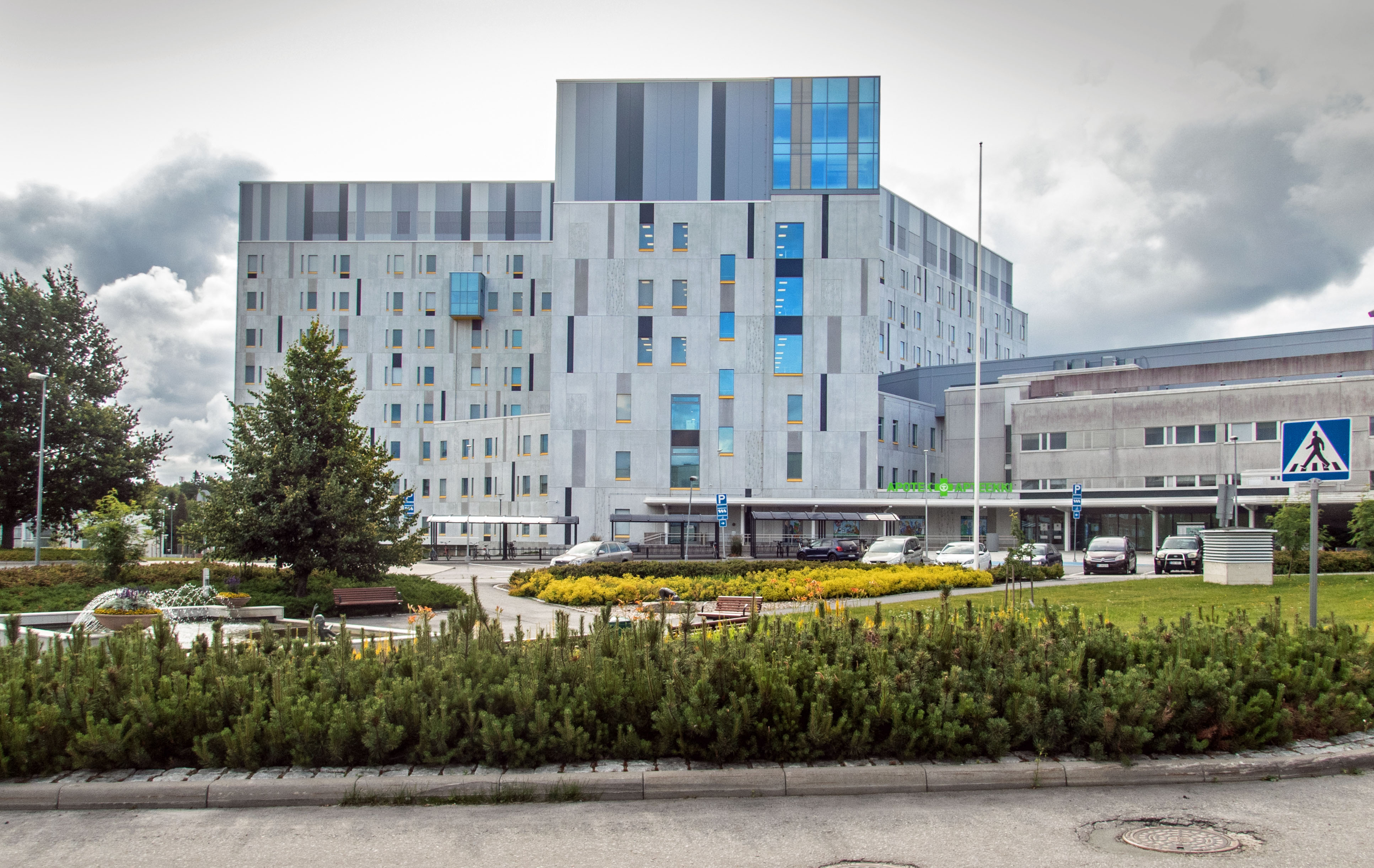
- Hospital exterior in 2023

Geography
- Location: Hietalahdenkatu 2-4; Vaasa, Finland
- Coordinates: 63.0846°N 21.6145°E

Services
- Emergency department: Yes

History
- Opened: 16 May 1956; 70 years ago

Vaasa Central Hospital (Finnish: Vaasan keskussairaala; Swedish: Vasa centralsjukhus) is a public hospital in Vaasa, Finland managed by Ostrobothnia wellbeing services county. The hospital operates an emergency department, intensive care unit, maternity ward, paediatric clinic, and other specialised departments.

== History ==
Construction began on 19 August 1952. The hospital, which was built at a cost of 1.35 billion markkaa, opened on 16 May 1956. It was announced in 2013 that the cardiac surgery department would be closed, and the number of beds would be reduced from 389 to 348.

In 2016, a healthcare reform aimed to centralise healthcare across the country. Among the proposed changes was reducing the number of hospitals with comprehensive emergency services to twelve. Since Vaasa Central Hospital was not included on the preliminary list, hospital officials and politicians raised concerns. The Swedish parliamentary group argued that at least one hospital, besides Helsinki University Central Hospital, should retain full-time bilingual staff and services. An estimated 5,000–10,000 people demonstrated in Vaasa in favour of the hospital retaining its comprehensive emergency status. Municipalities in the district published a joint full-page advertisement in Helsingin Sanomat. They cited Vaasa's roughly 50/50 bilingual population and expressed concern that greater reliance on Seinäjoki Central Hospital (where roughly 97.6% of the population are Finnish-speaking) could weaken access to Swedish-language care. The following year, a citizens' initiative seeking to add Vaasa to the list of hospitals was debated in Parliament. Representatives argued that its status as Finland's only fully bilingual hospital justified the designation to meet population needs and linguistic minority rights. Juha Rehula, the minister of family and social affairs, responded that even with the healthcare reform, Vaasa would remain a versatile emergency hospital, with select complex cases to be handled elsewhere.

After the healthcare reform failed, the Parliamentary Social Affairs and Health Committee voted in favour of a compromise deferring a final decision about Vaasa's status to the next government rather than directly amending legislation. During the renewed debate, it was noted that Vaasa Central Hospital would need to develop certain specialties, including neurology, to meet the comprehensive emergency criteria. In December 2019, all 13 municipalities in the Vaasa Hospital District agreed to replace the district with a new authority, the Ostrobothnia wellbeing services county, with the aim of consolidating responsibility for specialist, primary, and social care. On 1 January 2020, Vaasa Central Hospital was officially granted the status of a comprehensive, 24-hour emergency hospital. This decision marked a reversal of earlier plans under Juha Sipilä's government and stipulated that Seinäjoki Central Hospital would no longer be obligated to provide emergency services in Swedish.

The first COVID-19 case in Ostrobothnia was confirmed at Vaasa Central Hospital on 12 March 2020, the day after Tedros Adhanom Ghebreyesus of the World Health Organisation declared it a pandemic. On 18 March, the hospital announced they had collected samples from more than 200 people to test them for COVID-19. At this time, the samples had to be sent to Tampere, but Vaasa expected to begin running their own tests the following Monday. A new area of the emergency department was established on 7 April to keep patients with respiratory symptoms separate from those without. By 9 April, the hospital had gone into a high alert/mobilisation mode (full beredskap) due to the amount of COVID patients. On 4 January 2021, voluntary vaccination of Vaasa's healthcare workers began with the Pfizer–BioNTech COVID-19 vaccine, which was then the only one approved for use in Finland.

== Facilities and operations ==
Vaasa Central Hospital provides emergency and specialist care but does not have the capacity to perform all advanced procedures on site. For advanced stroke treatment, including mechanical thrombectomy, the hospital established a cross-border agreement in 2019 with Norrland University Hospital in Umeå, Sweden. With this arrangement, patients can be transferred by air ambulance rather than to the nearest Finnish university hospital, Tampere University Hospital. Vaasa's intensive care unit had seven beds as of March 2020. The hospital has a maternity ward, which recorded over 1,000 births in 2025, and is scheduled to move to a new renovated space in 2027. The pathology department performs clinical autopsies, as forensic autopsies are only performed at university hospitals. The hospital has pastoral care provided by hospital chaplains. There is also a hospital chapel and a quiet room (stilla rum). The hospital kitchen prepares meals for employees and patients.
