= Töölö Hospital =

Hospital in Helsinki, Finland

- Helsinki University Central Hospital
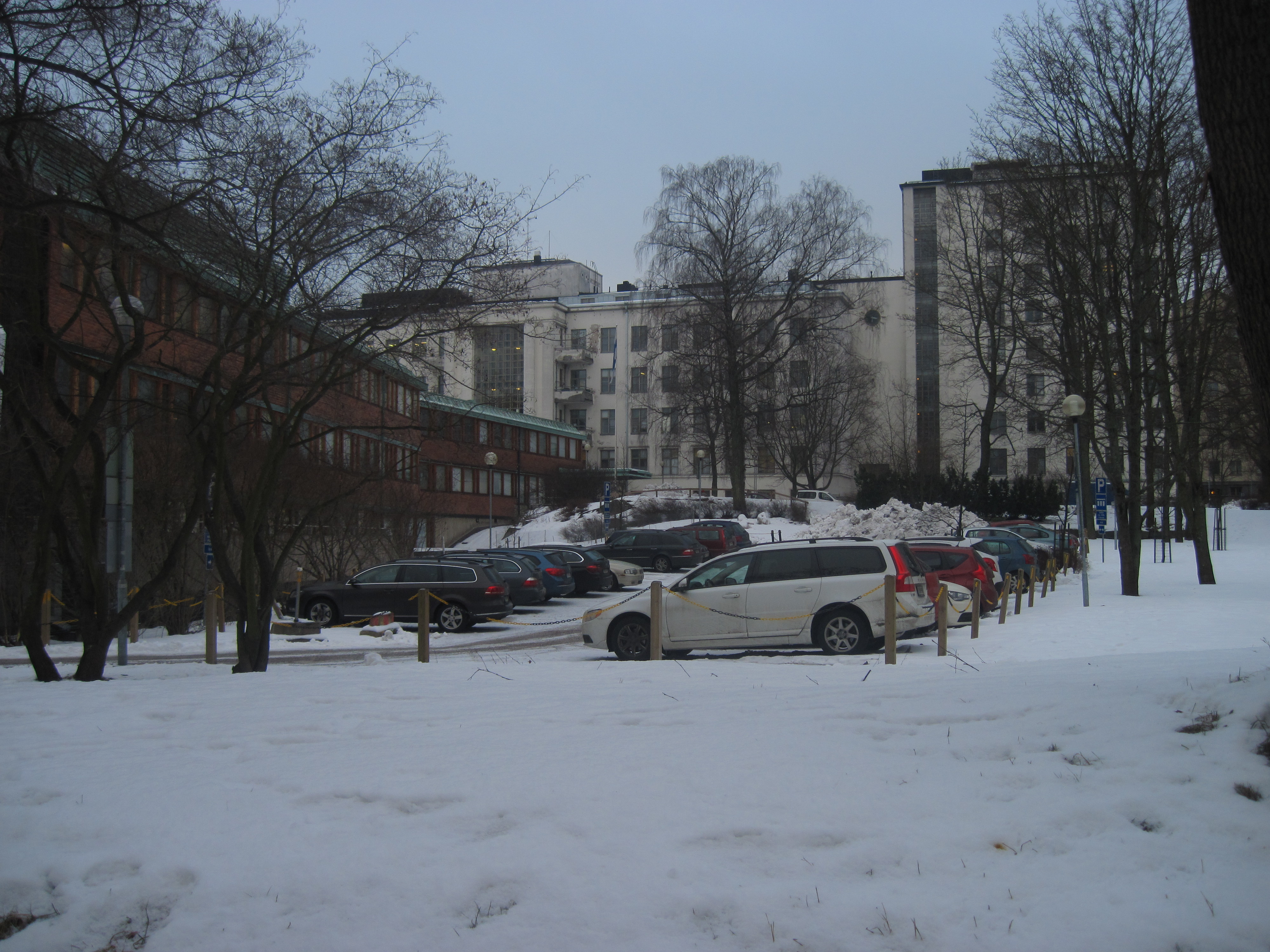
- The Töölö Hospital. In the background is the original white building from 1932, in the foreground is the red brick expansion building from 1959.

Geography
- Location: Topeliuksenkatu 5; 00260 Helsinki
- Coordinates: 60°10′51.07″N 24°55′23.23″E

History
- Former names: Finnish Red Cross Hospital; Mannerheim hospital
- Opened: 1919
- Closed: 2023
- Demolished: 2023–2024 (partially)

Links
- Website: www.hus.fi

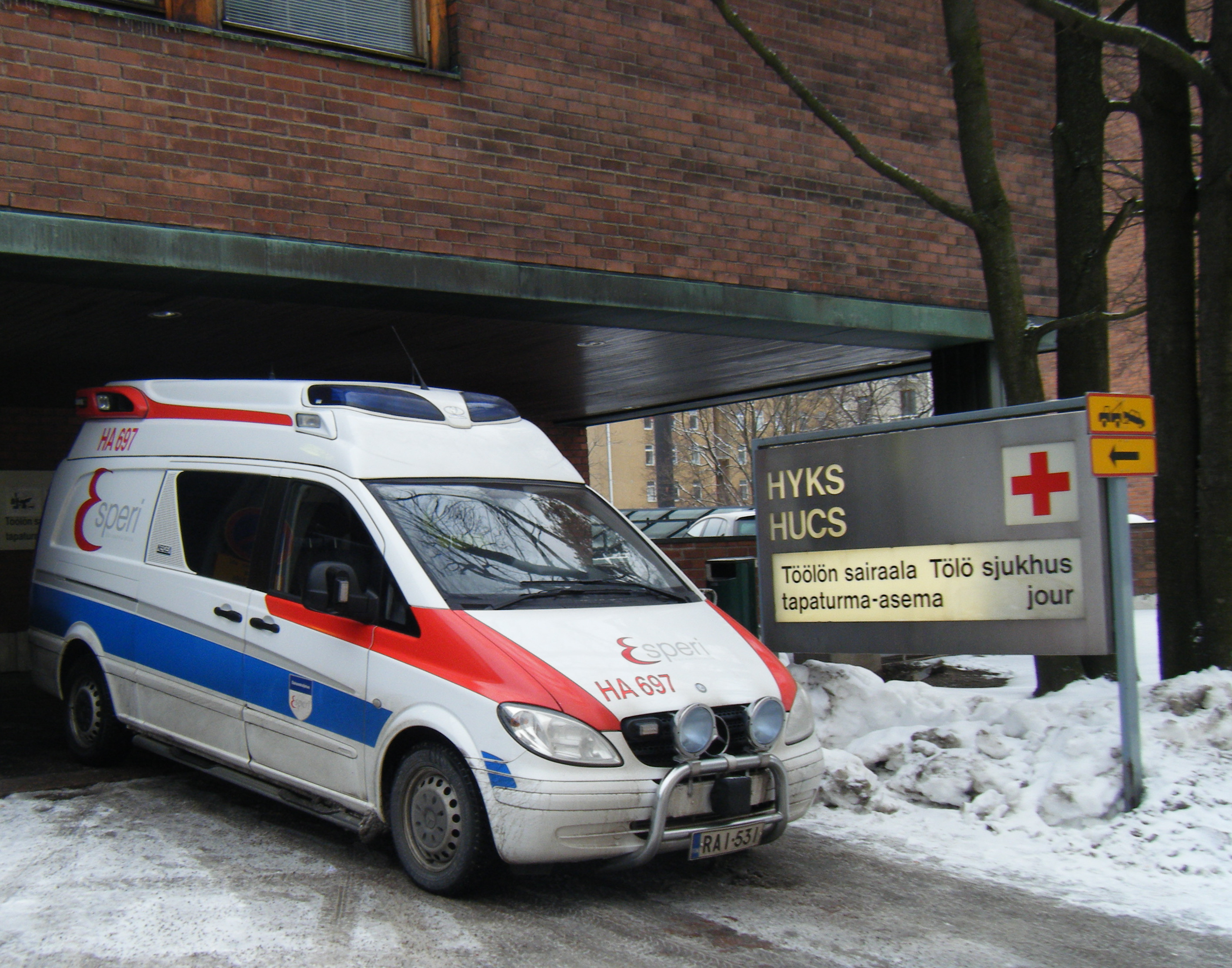
An Esperi Care ambulance in front of the trauma station of the Töölö Hospital.

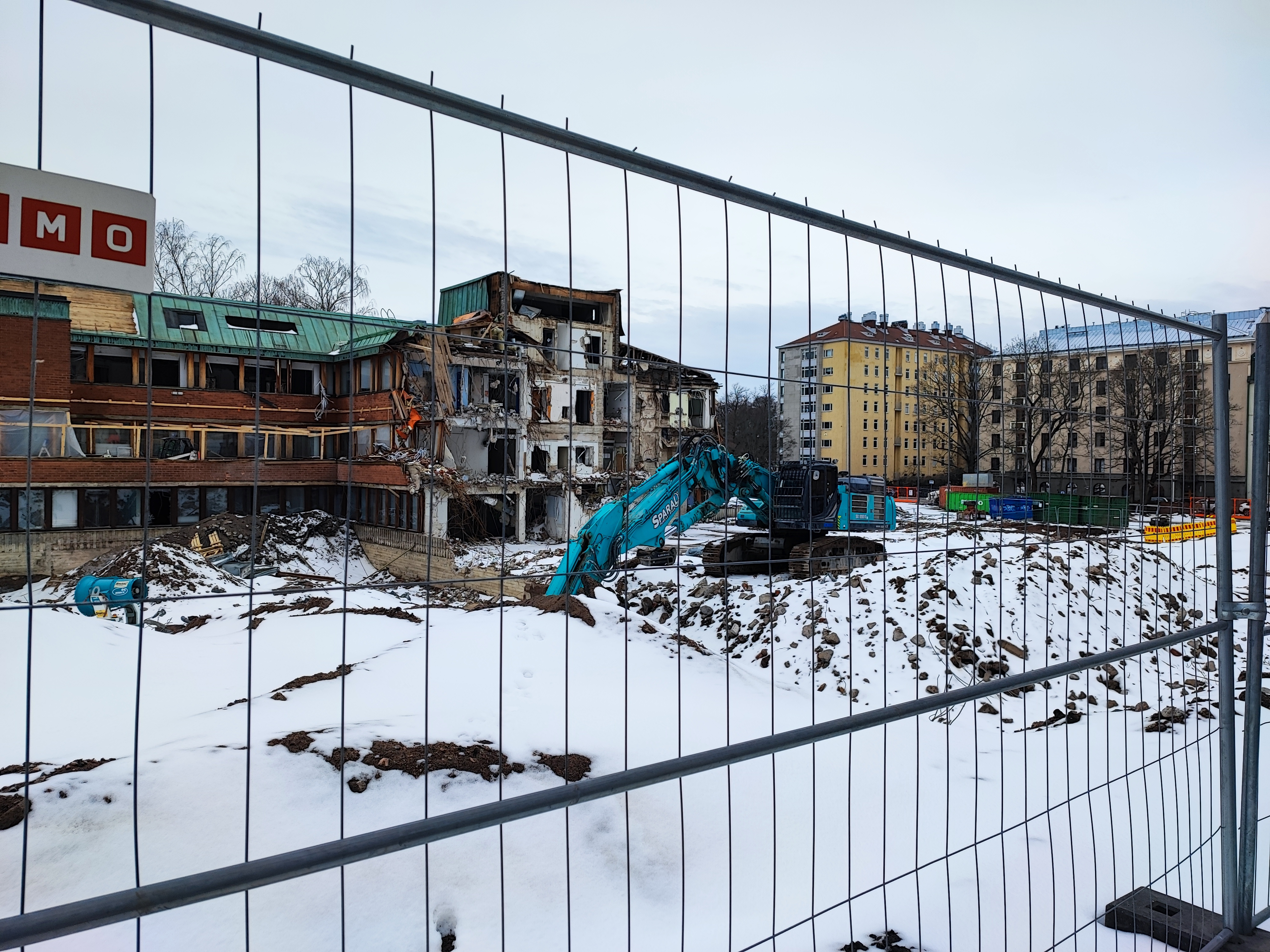
Töölö hospital being demolished in April 2024.

The Töölö Hospital was a hospital in Taka-Töölö, Helsinki, Finland, belonging to the Helsinki University Central Hospital. It had special departments for plastic surgery, orthopedic surgery and traumatology, hand surgery and neurosurgery. The hospital had a 24-hour policlinic receiving trauma patients from the Helsinki capital area and occasionally from the entire region of Southern Finland. Patients usually arrived at the policlinic on a medical note. The policlinic treated about 18 thousand patients per year. The hospital also hosted the cleft lip and cleft palate centre HUSUKE, containing research and care for cleft lips and cleft palates as well as the department for care of mouth and jaw diseases. The Töölö Hospital also had its own X-ray facility and laboratory.

The Töölö Hospital was part of the Helsinki and Uusimaa Hospital District. Until the early 1960s, the hospital was known by its earlier name as the Finnish Red Cross Hospital.

People who lived through wartime in Finland used to call the hospital with the name Mannerheim hospital, as field marshal Carl Gustaf Emil Mannerheim had become a personification of the Finnish Red Cross, and was also treated as a private patient at the Töölö Hospital.

The Töölö Hospital was discontinued in 2023 when the new Siltasairaala hospital in Meilahti was completed. The newer parts of the hospital, built in the 1950s and 1960s, are demolished in 2023–2024. The original hospital building, completed in 1932, will be preserved. New apartment buildings will be built in the site.

== History ==
The Finnish Red Cross started its hospital plan in 1919, partly because of the effect of the Finnish Civil War and the Red Cross's function at the time, to help the people wounded or injured in the war. Right from the start, the hospital was prominently associated with general (later field marshal) Mannerheim, who served as the chairman of the hospital board and later as an active member of the construction board. After a suitable lot was found in Taka-Töölö and funding was secured, planning of the hospital could begin. The hospital building, clad entirely in white, was built in 1932 designed by architect Jussi Paatela. The building represents a shift from classicist to functionalist architecture and has a lot in common with Paatela's other hospital work at the time, the Naistenklinikka hospital. After professor emeritus Richard Faltin had declined the post of head surgeon at the hospital because of his advanced age and illness, docent Simo Brofeldt was elected as the first head surgeon of the hospital. After Brofeldt's death he was succeeded by docent Aarno Snellman, who remained as the hospital's head surgeon until it was no longer needed.

Right from the start, the hospital's primary function was to improve hospital care for traumatic injuries and to prepare for needs the Red Cross would have during wartime. As such the hospital also hosted the repository of field hospital equipment of the Red Cross. The preparation for the war could also be seen in equipping the hospital with protection from gas attacks. In the beginning the hospital had 158 bed places. Right from the start, the hospital became the leading place for treatment of trauma patients and was probably the first hospital in Finland to have a first-aid station in connection to its outpatient department.

During the first months of the Winter War, the Finnish Red Cross hospital served as the hospital station for civil protection in Helsinki, treating victims of bombing. For this purpose, after the first wave of bombing in the war, it was helped by auxiliary hospitals, including the Kalastajatorppa restaurant building. During the general alarm phase from October to November 1939 most of the hospital staff had been evacuated to Aulanko in Hämeenlinna to serve at the 35th military hospital, but this organisation was cancelled before the war broke out. From February 1940, the hospital returned to the role of a military hospital in the medical care of the Finnish Defence Forces under the name of the Finnish Red Cross Military Hospital (P.R. SotaS.), including temporary departments at the Naistenklinikka hospital and the Mehiläinen hospital.

During the Interim Peace, construction of a bomb-proof hospital and surgery facility underneath the hospital garden was started and the hospital was expanded by the so-called Invalid Hospital at Tukholmankatu street, treating severe limb injuries, amputations and jaw and plastic surgery. The head surgeon at this hospital was medical major Sven Rehnberg, whose civilian post was deputy surgeon at the Red Cross hospital. Professor Faltin served as head of the jaw surgery department.

During the Continuation War the Military Hospital 54 was formed around the Red Cross hospital. In both wars the hospital concentrated especially on patients with brain and nerve damage as well as patients with severe limb or jaw injuries. Leading surgeons in the military hospital included its head surgeon medical colonel Brofeldt and medical major Snellman, and its chief surgeons first included professor and medical lieutenant colonel Arno Saxén and medical major Bertel Miesmäki after him. Department hospital of the Military Hospital 54 included the Finnish Red Cross hospital with its underground facilities, the Invalid Hospital, the Experimental Lyceum and the Swedish lyceum for girls. Later special departments included the old army hospital on Lönnrotinkatu for spinal injuries and the command school for the White Guard in Tuusula for aftercare and rehabilitation of brain injury patients. After the February 1944 bombings the hospital activities were spread out into temporary facilities, including the Meltola sanatorium, the Workers' institute, the Jorvi manor and Vestankvarn in Ingå. Treatment of severe war injuries continued in the Military Hospital 54 until the end of 1946, after which the hospital could slowly return to its peacetime duty.

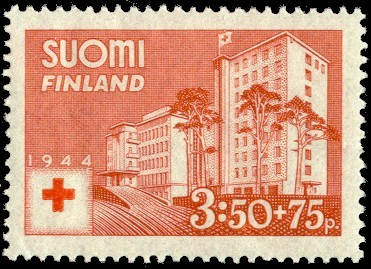
In 1944 the Finnish post office and the Finnish Red Cross published a series of stamps. One of them shows the Finnish Red Cross hospital, acting as Military Hospital 54 at the time. The hospital is now known as the Töölö Hospital.

After the founding of the Helsinki University Central Hospital the Finnish Red Cross hospital could no longer continue its earlier function, and the organisation sold its hospital premises to the Central Hospital in 1958. The expansion part constituting the current neurological clinic, trauma treatment station and outpatient clinic was completed in 1959; the expansion originally planned in the 1940s was supposed to cover a separate rheumatism department. After the expansion part had been completed, the main entrance to the hospital moved to its current place, whereas the old entrance had been located on the street intersecting the hospital grounds, referred to as the Red Cross alley, which was since cut off. Even after the war the hospital's major function was to tend to trauma patients, but it still served as a general surgical facility up to 1960. After this the hospital premises were used for the I and V surgery clinics of the Central Hospital, specialising in orthopedics, traumatology and neurosurgery. Professor Kalle Kallio was chosen as the new director (1960-1967) of the hospital. In 1960 the hospital was renamed as the Töölö Hospital to avoid confusion about its ownership. The trauma care station was expanded into premises originally belonging to the blood transfusion service of the Finnish Red Cross in 1966. In the same year an intensive care station for traumatology with four patient places was started in the hospital.

The Töölö Hospital can be considered as the birthplace of Finnish neurosurgery. The hospital's deputy surgeon Aarno Snellman (later additional professor of neurosurgery since 1947) travelled to Stockholm in 1935 to learn modern neurosurgery from Herbert Olivecrona in the Serafimer hospital. After returning to Finland, he performed his first brain surgery in September 1935 and the first proper neurosurgical department in Finland was opened in the hospital in the next year. At the same time, the hospital's X-ray surgeon doctor Yrjö Lassila studied neuroradiology taught by Olivecrona's coworker, radiologist Eric Lysholm. Before the Winter War and immediately after it a few younger doctors, such as Mikko Eirto and Gunnar af Björkesten - later the first professor of neurosurgery at the University of Helsinki - had the chance to study neurosurgery and adapt their learning to treatment of brain and nerve trauma during the Continuation War. The function of the neurosurgical department advanced through the significant experience gained from skull and brain injuries during the war. During the entire war, a care department for brain injury patients was active at the civil protection premises in the hospital, led by Snellman and Teuvo Mäkelä. In addition to and in connection with the neurosurgery, the hospital also made advances in anaesthesiology and intensive care. The first office for an anesthesiologist was founded in 1952 and the first intensive care department in Finland was founded in connection to the neurosurgical clinic in 1959.

== Blood donation service ==
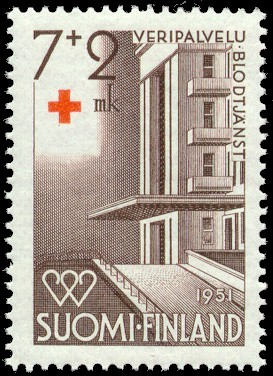
In 1951 the Finnish post office and the Finnish Red Cross published a series of stamps. One of the stamps shows the Töölö Hospital with its main entrance.

There has been a blood donation service connected to the hospital. The first blood donors were mainly scouts. For blood donation, a special donation space was built to the hospital's basement with normal care tables at first, later with specially designed adjustable beds for blood donors. There was a small café with less than ten customer spaces for blood donors.

The blood donation service worked in these basic premises for over a quarter of a century until the Red Cross received a new specially built hospital building in Kivihaka. At this time the blood donation premises were converted into the use of surgery time registration.

== See also ==
- List of hospitals in Finland
