= Åland Central Hospital =

Hospital in Mariehamn, Åland

- Ålands hälso- och sjukvård

Geography
- Location: 1 Doktorsvägen; Mariehamn, Åland
- Coordinates: 60.1156°N 19.9327°E

Services
- Emergency department: Yes
- Beds: 121

Helipads
- Helipad: Yes

History
- Opened: 1953; 73 years ago

Åland Central Hospital (Swedish: Ålands centralsjukhus; Finnish: Ahvenanmaan keskussairaala) is a public hospital in Mariehamn, Åland managed by Ålands hälso- och sjukvård (ÅHS). With 121 beds and around 1,000 employees, it serves as a primary healthcare hub for the autonomous, Swedish-speaking archipelago region of Finland. It operates an emergency department, intensive care unit, maternity ward, and various other departments.

The hospital was founded in 1953 and operates under regional legislation that allows it to maintain specialised services despite serving a smaller population than typically required by Finnish healthcare regulations. Åland is also the only location outside of Sweden where Swedish medical graduates can complete their internships. The hospital has faced challenges due to Åland's linguistic and geographic situation, as well as labour disputes and complications from the COVID-19 pandemic.

== History ==
The first hospital in Åland opened on 1 January 1846 in Godby. The primary reason for its founding was to combat venereal diseases. Åland Central Hospital was established in Mariehamn in 1953, under a new national law on central hospitals.

Ålands hälso- och sjukvård (ÅHS) was formed in 1994 by merging the central hospital with two organisations, one that provided primary care on the islands and the other responsible for psychiatric care. In September of that year, the hospital was involved in the emergency response to the sinking of the MS Estonia. Rescue helicopters transported several survivors to Mariehamn Airport and then to the intensive care unit at Åland Central Hospital.

A nurses' strike involving around 340 people began in Åland on 2 June 2003, associated with Union of Health and Social Care Professionals – Tehy. After rejecting a proposed agreement from the government, Tehy announced it was prepared for the strike to affect staff in the hospital's emergency department and intensive care unit. This prompted the Lantråd, Roger Nordlund, to express concern about potential risks to public safety. A resolution was reached in September 2003 after roughly 3.5 months. The agreement included an increase in salary, preserved vacation entitlements for the duration of the strike, and granted the union collective bargaining rights. In November 2014, there was another nurses' strike associated with Tehy, which led the government of Åland to appeal to several Finnish national ministries for assistance imposing compulsory "protective work."

On 31 March 2020, the hospital requested a tent from the Finnish Red Cross to minimise the spread of COVID-19 during patient triage. During the COVID-19 pandemic, Finnish quarantine regulations prevented Swedish physicians from commuting to work at Åland Central Hospital. In 2020, Swedes made up 22 of the hospital's 86 doctors, and the two-week quarantine requirement made their rotational work arrangements impractical. As a result, ÅHS planned to seek Swedish-speaking staff from Turku University Hospital, prioritising critical specialties such as anaesthesiology. ÅHS emphasised that Swedish language proficiency was essential for patient safety in Åland, which is a monolingual Swedish-speaking autonomous region. Emergency medical transport, which relied on a Swedish helicopter ambulance service, was maintained despite the quarantine requirement. By the following March, the COVID-19 pandemic in Åland had worsened, with the incidence rate rising to over 400 cases per 100,000 inhabitants. Despite the surge in cases, the situation at Åland Central Hospital was considered stable, with one COVID-19 patient hospitalised and none requiring intensive care. However, Åland's director of health and medical services, Jeanette Pajunen, also emphasised their inherent vulnerability, noting reliance on a single hospital and the need to transfer patients to mainland Finland or Sweden if its capacity were exceeded.

In 2022, representatives from Finland's National Coalition Party visited Åland Central Hospital as a case study of a centralised healthcare system. Åland's government began preparing an application to fund a new or partially renovated hospital in 2026, while also noting that the hospital's helipad required urgent reconstruction to avoid closure.

== Facilities and operations ==
The hospital has 121 beds. It serves as a regional hub for healthcare in Åland, and employs around 1,000 people. Åland Central Hospital operates autonomously using regional legislation. While Finnish healthcare regulations typically require 1,000 annual births for maternity wards and 600 annual joint replacement surgeries for surgical departments, the hospital maintains those departments with approximately 260 births and 130 joint replacement surgeries per year, as of 2018.

Due to Åland's status as an archipelago, air ambulance transport makes up a central part of hospital operations. Patients from outlying islands may require helicopter transfer to Åland Central Hospital in Mariehamn, while critical patients requiring specialist care may need to be taken to mainland Finland or Sweden.

== Education ==
Åland is the only place outside of Sweden where recent Swedish medical school graduates are able to complete their allmäntjänstgöring (AT) internships. The cross-border collaboration with Uppsala University Hospital has been described as "indispensable" to the healthcare system in Åland. In 2018, there were eight Swedish physicians in Åland affiliated with the programme. Åland Central Hospital also participated as a training site in a pilot bilingual medical education program coordinated by the University of Turku with Åbo Akademi University. Four medical students began their clinical training at the hospital in 2023, as part of an initiative to increase the number of Swedish-speaking physicians in Finland.
