= Puijonlaakso =

City district in Kuopio, Finland

Coordinates: 62°54′14″N 27°38′27″E

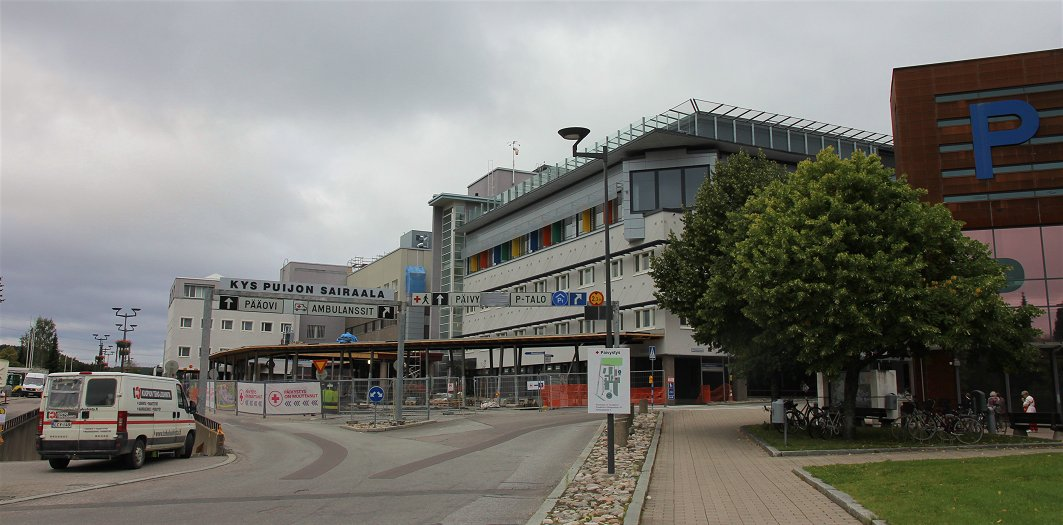
The Puijo Hospital

Puijonlaakso is a district in the city of Kuopio, Finland. As the name implies, it is located right next to Puijo Hill and is a very green area. The area has about 6,400 inhabitants, many of whom are students.

The area includes the Puijonlaakso shopping center, nursing homes and the Hotel Savonia, in connection with which the tourism, nutrition and economics education unit of Savo Vocational College with Adult Education Center and Savonia University of Applied Sciences operates. Puijo Church was completed in 1977, as part of a larger parish center. Puijonlaakso also includes part of the University of Eastern Finland in Savilahti and the entire Kuopio University Hospital.

== See also ==
- Puijo (district)
