= Meilahti =

Coordinates: 60°11′N 24°54′E

Meilahti Mejlans
- Helsinki Subdivision
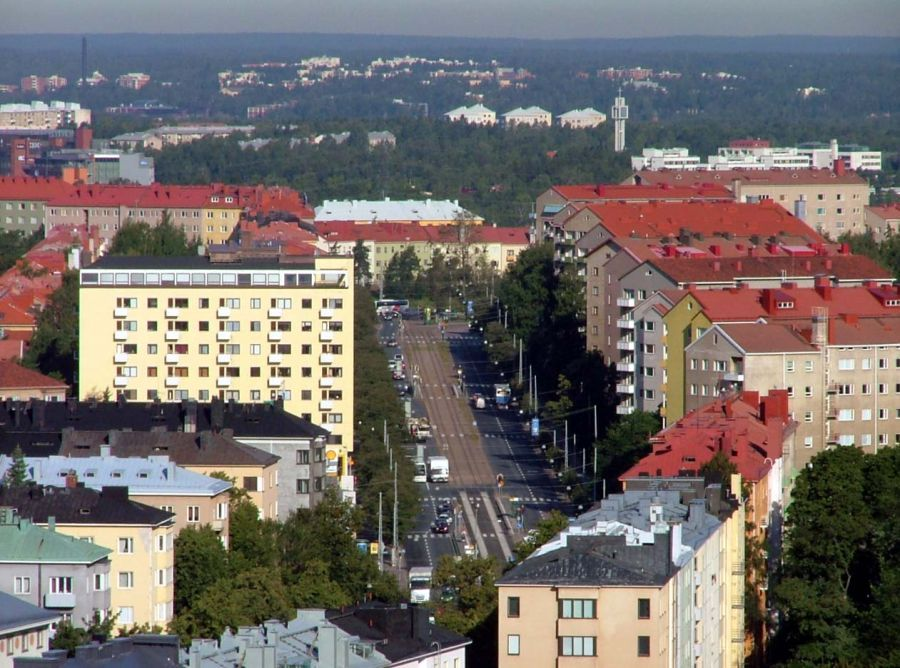
- View along Mannerheimintie with apartment buildings of Meilahti to the left, and those of Laakso to the right

- Position of Meilahti within Helsinki
- Country: Finland
- Region: Uusimaa
- Sub-region: Greater Helsinki
- Municipality: Helsinki
- District: Western
- Area: 2.12 km^{2} (0.82 sq mi)
- Population: 6,792
  - Density: 3,090/km^{2} (8,000/sq mi)
- Postal codes: 00270, 00250
- Subdivision number: 15
- Neighbouring subdivisions: Vanha Munkkiniemi, Laakso, Ruskeasuo, Kuusisaari, Lehtisaari, Taka-Töölö, Etu-Töölö

Meilahti (in Swedish Mejlans) is a neighbourhood of Helsinki between Mannerheimintie (the main entrance road to Helsinki) and a bay named Seurasaarenselkä. The population of Meilahti is about 5200 people. Meilahti is part of the Reijola district together with Laakso and Ruskeasuo. The area is bordered to the west by the sea, to the south by the Stenbäckinkatu street, to the east by the Mannerheimintie street and to the north by the park area continuing from the Tilkanvierto street. The Seurasaari islands are also part of Meilahti.

Most of the houses in Meilahti were built in the 1930s and 1940s. The northern part of Meilahti consists of apartment buildings, of which the most were built in the middle 20th century. The Meilahti Church and the Catholic St. Mary's Church are located in Meilahti. The western part of Meilahti was built only in the 1990s and forms part of the Pikku Huopalahti area built at the time.

The "Vähä Meilahti" part of Meilahti to the west and south of the Paciuksenkatu street is an old villa area originally founded for summer villas for Helsinkians in the 1880s. Many villas dating from that period still remain in private ownership, now also inhabited in winter, some even having passed down to the third generation. Some of the villas have been converted to cafés or into use for families of patients of the Children's Clinic hospital.

Vähä Meilahti is the location of Mäntyniemi, official residence of the President of Finland, as well as Kesäranta, the official residence of Prime Minister of Finland. Near Mäntyniemi is the former presidential residence, Tamminiemi, which is today a museum dedicated to president Urho Kekkonen. The Helsinki Art Museum was previously located in Meilahti. There is an exercise park in Meilahti with basketball and pesäpallo fields.

Meilahti is known for its large hospital area, including the Meilahti Campus of the University of Helsinki. Several hospitals are located in this district, including the Meilahti Hospital of the Helsinki University Central Hospital (HUCH). Other facilities in Meilahti include the Women's Clinic, the Faculty of Medicine of the University of Helsinki and Biomedicum Helsinki.

Neighbourhoods surrounding Meilahti are Töölö, Munkkiniemi, Ruskeasuo, Pikku Huopalahti and Laakso.

For the 1952 Summer Olympics, the neighborhood hosted the rowing events.

Meilahti was originally part of the Rural Municipality of Helsinki and was annexed to Helsinki proper in 1906. The area was officially named Meilahti in 1959.

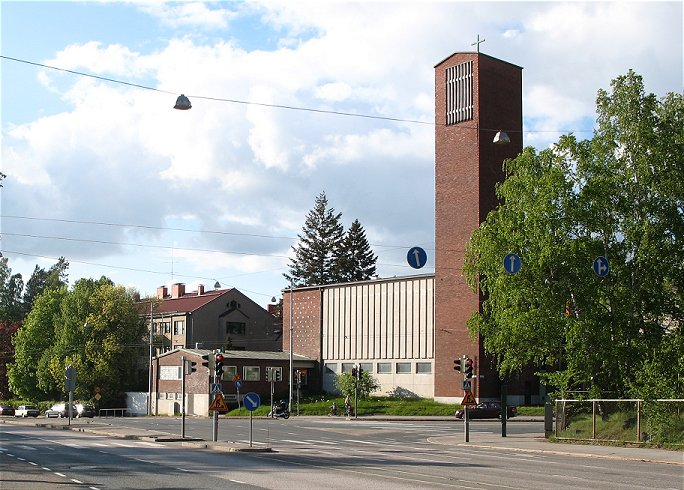
St. Mary's Church in Meilahti

== Etymology ==
The Swedish name of Meilahti first appears in official documents since the 17th century as Mäjlans (1670), Meilantz (1681) and Meilans (1765). The name might have come from a similarly named farm at the site. According to professor Heikki Ojansuu the original form of the name might have been Maijala, but it might also have come from the German person name Mejle. There previously was a village named Hindersnäs at the site, which was last mentioned in the 1560s. This name comes from the male person name Hindrik.

== Gallery ==
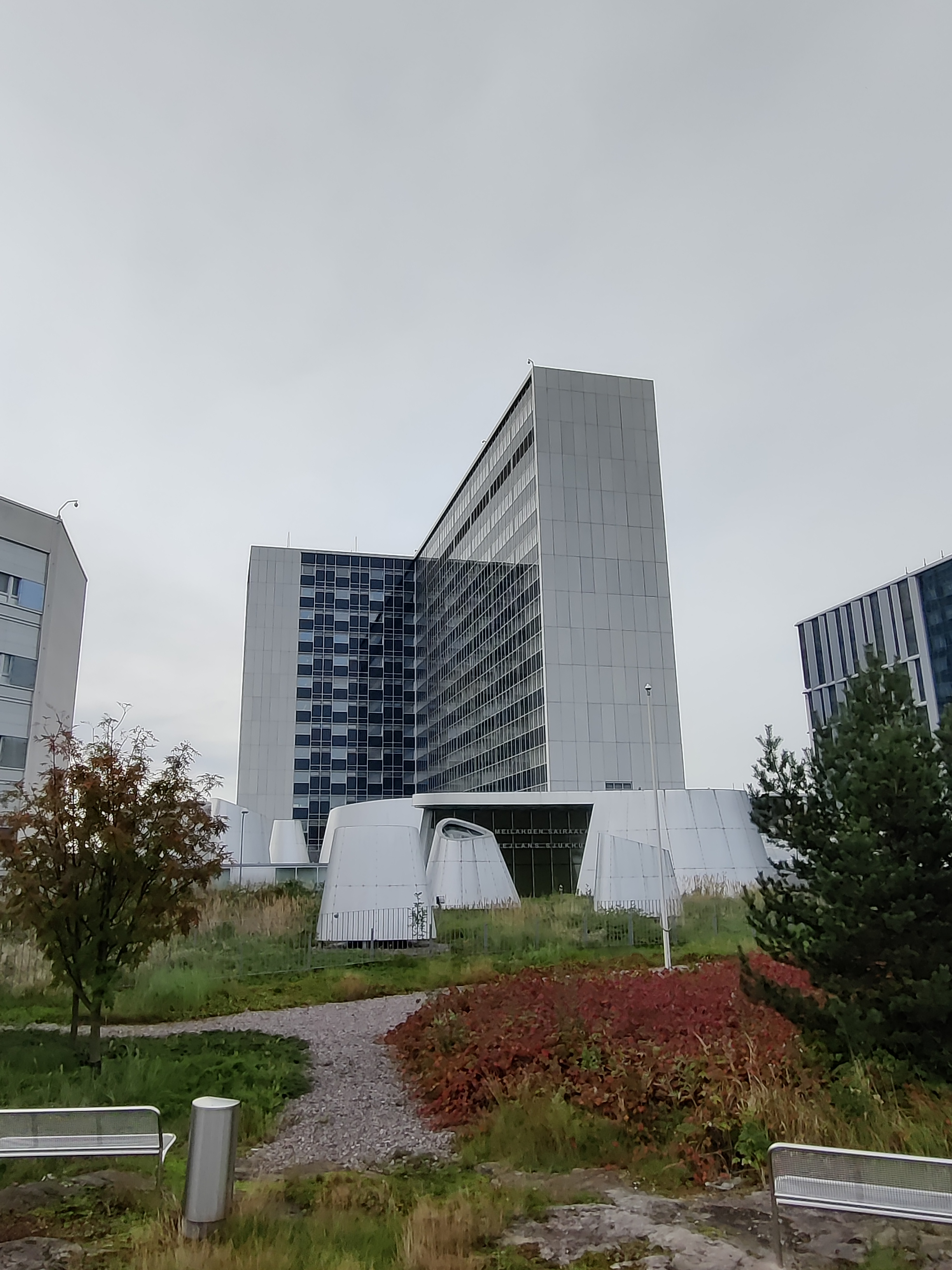
Meilahti Tower Hospital

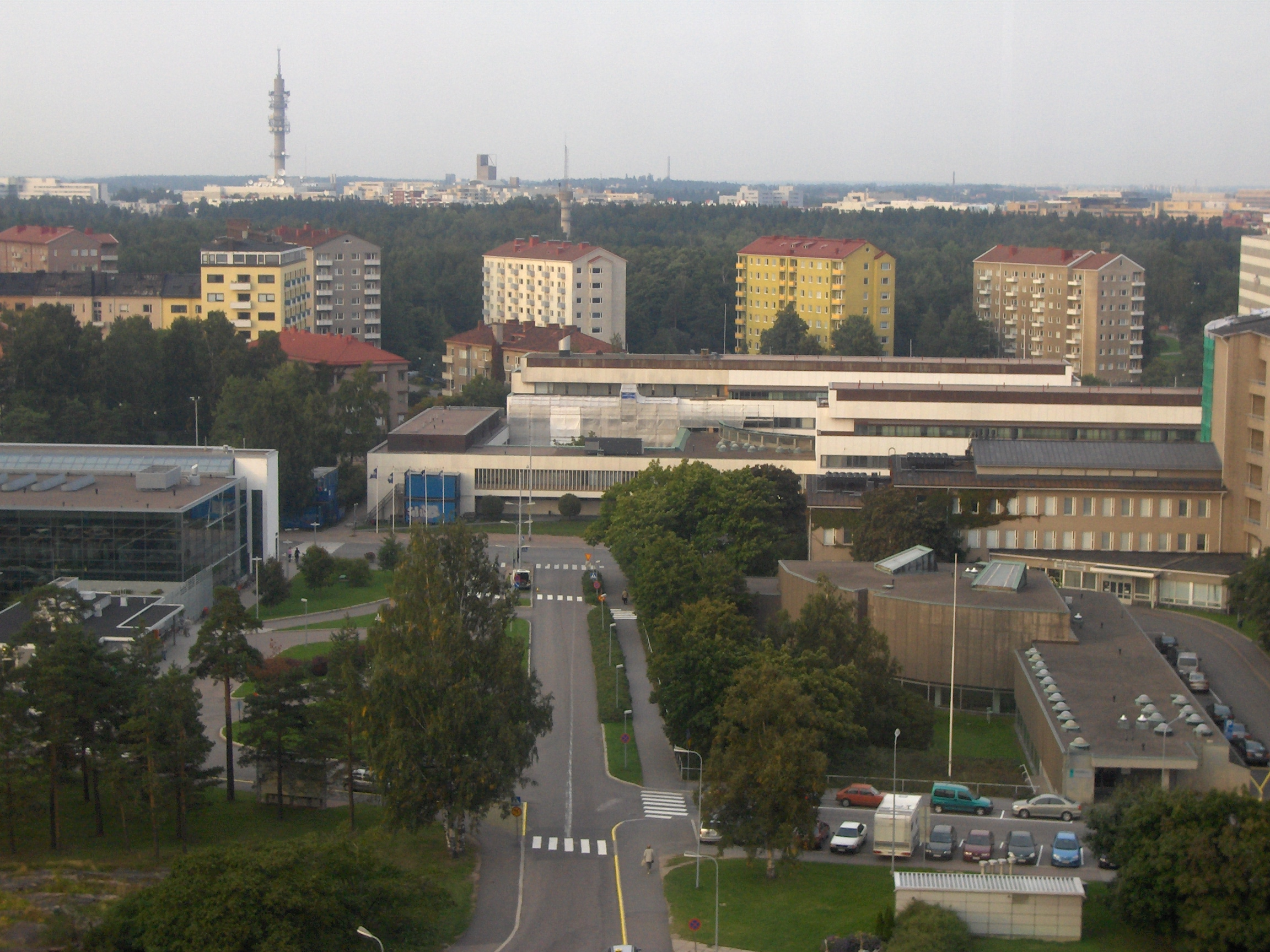
View over Meilahti from a window at the top floor of the hospital

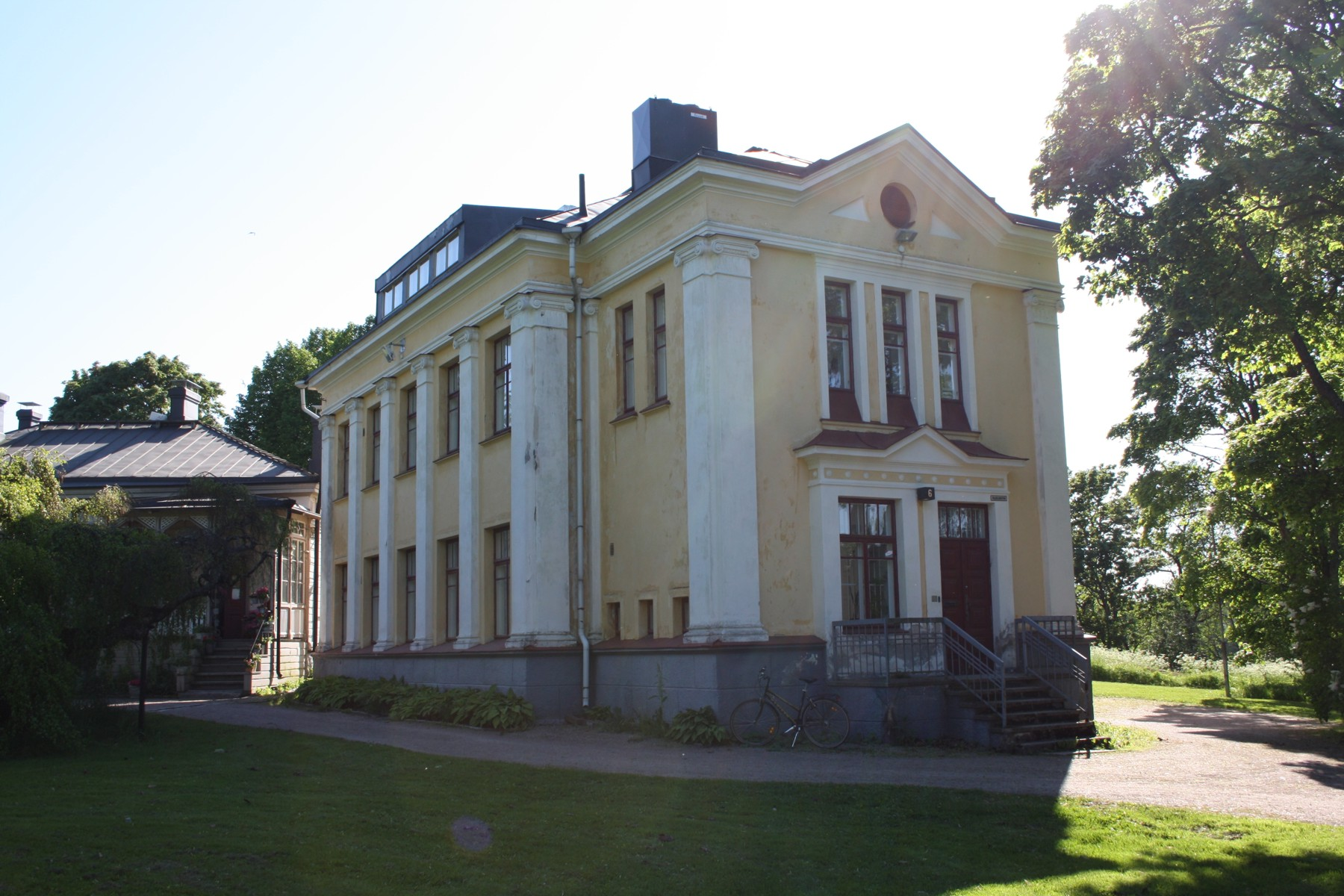
The Meilahti Manor

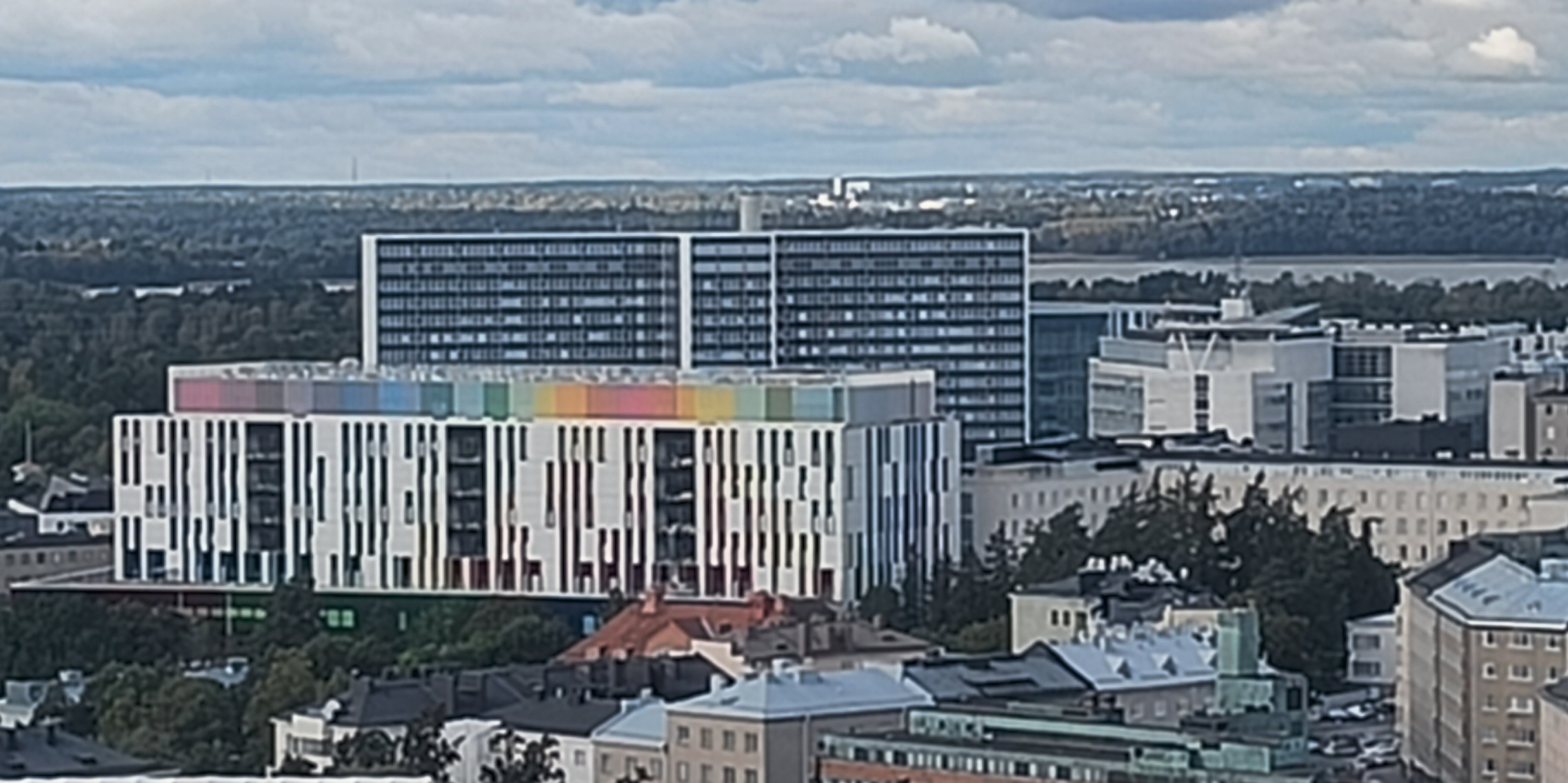
Aerial image of the Meilahti hospital area
