= Kuopio University Hospital =

- Hospital District of Northern Savonia
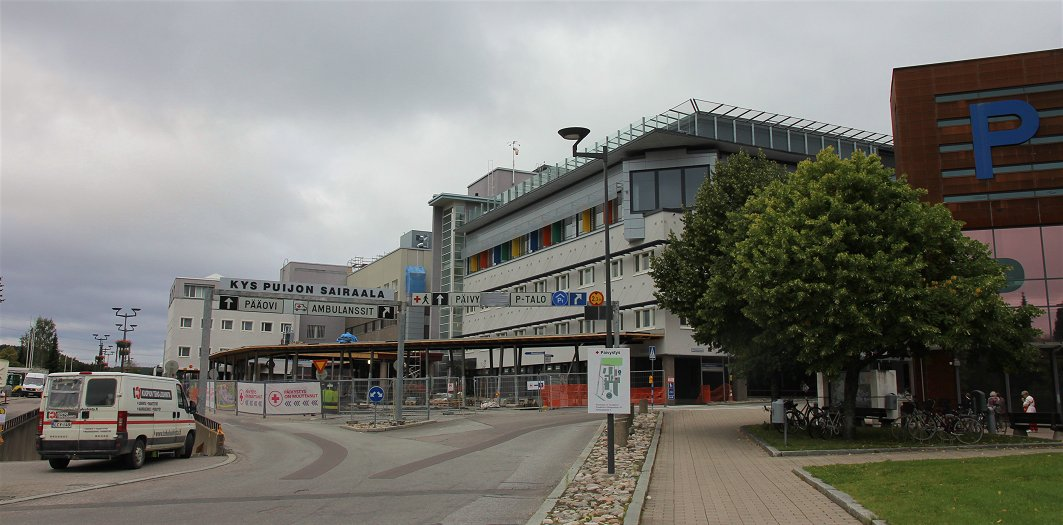
- Central Hospital Building in Puijonlaakso

Geography
- Location: Puijonlaaksontie 2, Kuopio, Kuopio, Finland
- Coordinates: 62°53′51″N 27°38′49″E

Organisation
- Type: Teaching
- Affiliated university: University of Eastern Finland

History
- Founded: 1959

Links
- Website: https://pshyvinvointialue.fi
- Lists: Hospitals in Finland

Kuopio University Hospital (KUH; Finnish: Kuopion yliopistollinen sairaala, KYS, Swedish: Kuopio universitetssjukhus) is a teaching hospital of the University of Eastern Finland along Puijonlaaksontie at the Puijonlaakso district in Kuopio, Finland. It serves as one of the main hospitals in the country and operates in the facilities of Central Hospital of Puijo (Puijon keskussairaala), Children's Hospital of Alava (Alavan lastensairaala) and Psychiatric Hospital of Julkula (Julkulan psykiatrinen sairaala) in Kuopio, and also former Tarina Hospital (Tarinan sairaala) in Siilinjärvi.

After Kuopio, the municipalities of Siilinjärvi, Varkaus and Iisalmi use the services of the hospital district the most. KYS is Kuopio's second largest employer after the city of Kuopio; in 2011, Kuopio University Hospital employed a total of 4,113 people. KYS is also Finland's largest medical educator in terms of enrollment.

KYS has an Epilepsy Center (Epilepsiakeskus) that provides diagnostics and treatment for severe epilepsy in both adults and children. The unit's special expertise is intracranial brain curve recordings and epilepsy surgery, which are nationwide concentrated in Kuopio and Helsinki, but most of Finland's epilepsy surgical procedures are performed in Kuopio. With regard to other areas of expertise in KYS, the Heart Center (Sydänkeskus) is a worldwide pioneer in the development of biological bypass surgery and gene therapy for heart failure.

== See also ==
- North Karelia Central Hospital
