= Peijas Hospital =

- Helsinki Region University Central Hospital
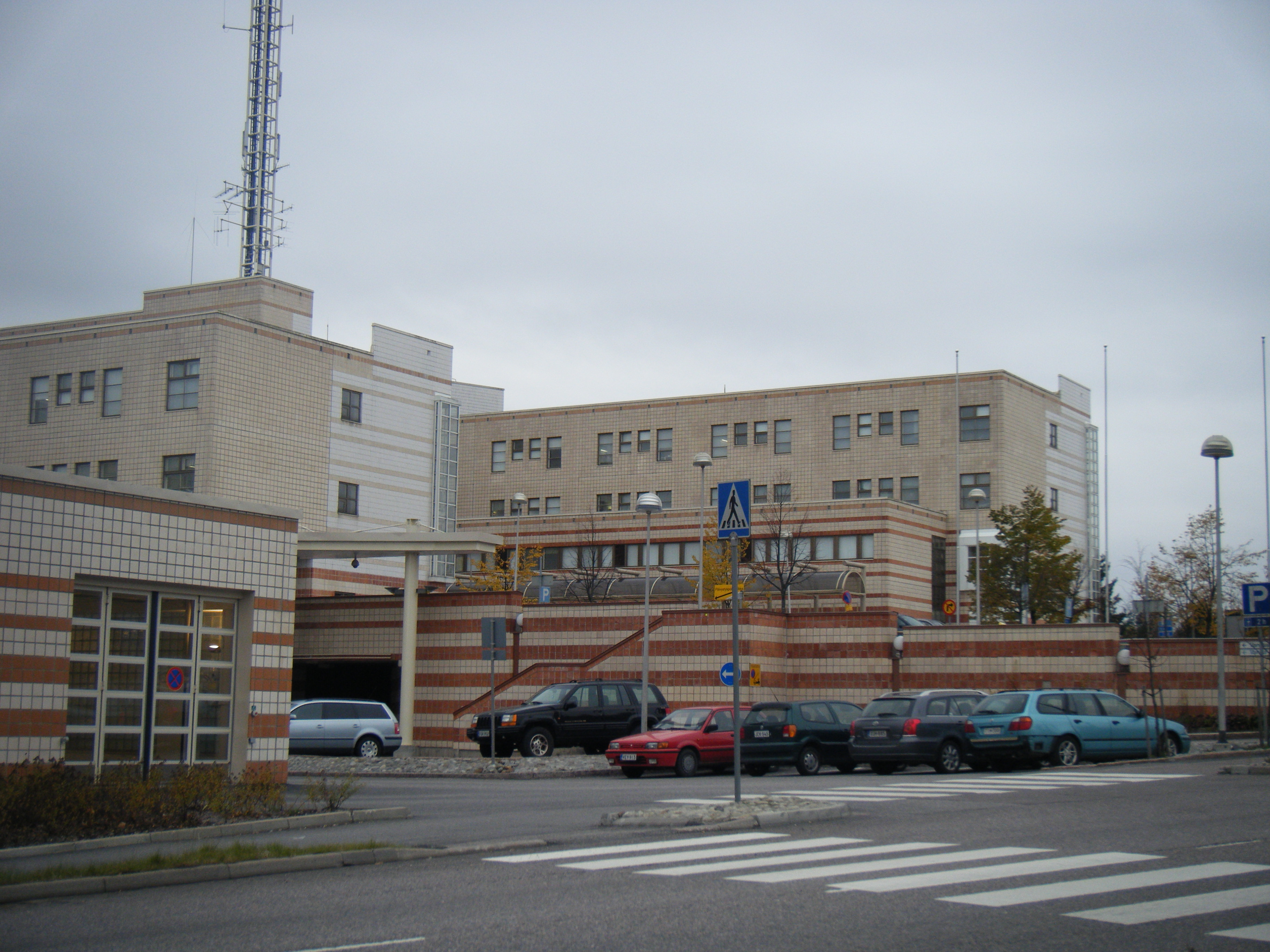

Geography
- Location: Asola, Vantaa, Finland
- Coordinates: 60°19′53″N 25°03′33″E

Organisation
- Type: General
- Affiliated university: University of Helsinki

Services
- Emergency department: Yes
- Beds: 267

History
- Opened: 1990

Links
- Website: www.hus.fi/sairaanhoito/sairaalat/peijaksen-sairaala/Sivut/default.aspx
- Lists: Hospitals in Finland

The Peijas Hospital is a hospital belonging to the Helsinki and Uusimaa hospital district (HUS), located in Asola, Vantaa. Since 2001 the hospital has been part of the functionality division of the Helsinki region university central hospital.

The first construction phase, designed by architect Pekka Terävä, was completed in 1990, and the second phase was completed in 1993. The third phase, designed under the leadership of architect Pekka Koivula, was completed from 2005 to 2007. It expanded the total area by a third, about 16 500 m². The expansion also added a chapel to the hospital.

The hospital has bed places for 267 patients, also places for 50 psychiatric patients and 16 places at the Kerava Klondyke. There are 1 450 employees, of which 1 100 work at the Peijas Hospital building.

The Peijas Hospital has good public transport connections with stops for several Vantaa internal bus lines and bus lines from Helsinki, Kerava and Tuusula. The hospital is also a walking distance away from the Rekola and Koivukylä railway stations.
