= Meilahti Tower Hospital =

Hospital in Helsinki, Finland

- Helsinki University Central Hospital
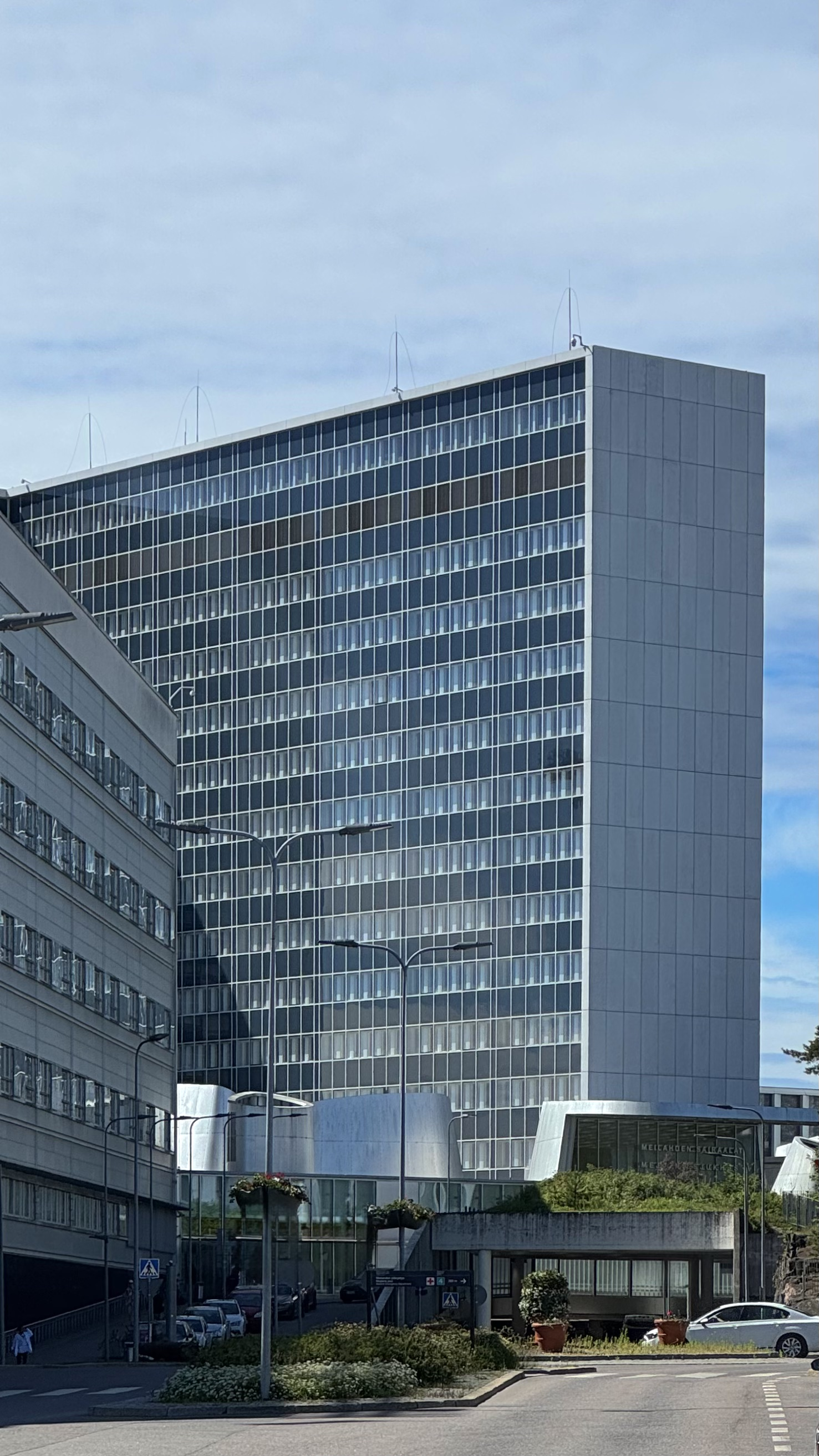

Geography
- Location: Meilahti, Helsinki, FI
- Coordinates: 60°11′19″N 024°54′19″E

Organisation
- Type: Teaching
- Affiliated university: University of Helsinki

Services
- Emergency department: Yes
- Beds: 538

Helipads
- Helipad: ICAO: EFHY

History
- Founded: 1965

The Meilahti Tower Hospital, part of the Helsinki University Central Hospital (HUCH), is the largest hospital in Finland, located in the Meilahti district of Helsinki. The name of the hospital was changed in 2010 from "Meilahti Hospital" to "Meilahti Tower Hospital" to make it stand out from other hospitals in the area. The address of the hospital is Haartmaninkatu 4.

The Meilahti Tower Hospital is part of the HUS collective. It is the largest hospital in the HUS collective and offers treatments in heart and chest surgery, vein surgery, gastric surgery and special areas of neurology. All organ transplantations for adults in Finland have been concentrated in the hospital. The first heart transplantation in Finland was done in the Meilahti Tower Hospital directed by professor Severi Mattila in 1985.

The hospital is located in a large city block which also contains the Park Hospital (previously known as the Children's Clinic), the New Children's Hospital, the Women's Clinic, the Corner Hospital, the Haartman Hospital, the Triangle Hospital, the Bridge Hospital, the Cancer Clinic and buildings of the Faculty of Medicine of the University of Helsinki such as Biomedicum Helsinki and the Health Science Central Library Terkko. The northwestern corner of the block also contains the former building of the Nursery Academy. The neighbouring block across the street Haartmaninkatu contains the Faculty of Dentistry as well as the Mouth and Dental Centre (in the premises of the former Work Healthcare Centre built from 1948 to 1951) as well as the Haartman Institute (Theoretical Department of the Faculty of Medicine).

The new entrance and lobby of the hospital were completed in May 2010. At first the lobby only had access to the Tower Hospital itself, but in November 2010 the new Triangle Hospital was opened, accessed from the same entrance, and in 2023 the lobby also included access to the Bridge Hospital.

The hospital has a helipad with the ICAO airport code EFHY.

== History ==
The current hospital building was inaugurated on 20 November 1965. The HUCH internal medicine clinics I and II moved from the Helsinki General Hospital on Unioninkatu 38 and from the New Clinic on Unioninkatu 33 and all departments were taken into use by October 1966. The completion of the hospital was such a big event that it was inaugurated by the President of Finland at the time, Urho Kekkonen. The hospital was also presented during official state visits to Finland.

The building was designed by the architects Jaakko Paatela and Reino Koivula. It represents meager modernism. It was the first hospital building intended to resemble a skyscraper in Finland. The shape was influenced by the available space, but also by the attempt to create good traffic connections between different parts of the hospital and a "good opportunity to open pleasant views from the patient rooms towards the Gulf of Finland and the archipelago" as the concept was described during the design of the building. The original Meilahti Hospital consisted of a low pedestal containing the operation and laboratory parts and a 16-floor bed place tower built on top of it. The building type represents a stylistically pure "tower on top of a pedestal" solution.

The original design from 1951 included a great hospital with 3 thousand bedplaces, with the building shaped like a three-pointed star with one wing containing the bedplaces, another wing containing the outpatient clinics and the third wing containing the operation rooms, but the completed solution was much more modest according to the 1956 design. The contract for building the largest hospital building in Finland was signed in November 1962. There were almost a thousand bedplaces divided into thirty departments with 32 patient places each.

The building is 54 to 60 metres high and has 18 floors, of which three are underground. The building's impressive size and resemblance to a hotel instantly gave it a nickname "the Meilahti Hilton". The hospital originally included seven university clinics, two outpatient clinics, a hospital central laboratory and education facilities. The intensive care unit was originally absent from the plans and was only placed next to the operation rooms after the building was completed. The building was cast from steel-reinforced concrete on site and its dark blue-gray glass facades were the first raster-shaped curtain walls in Finland. The window structures had to be repaired from 1980 to 1996 many times to fix the draught affecting both the hospital's function and its comfort. When the hospital was completed it was described as: a volume of 220 thousand cubic metres, 4721 windows, 8 thousand square metres of facade glass and 5.5 hectares of cleanable floor space.

All bedplace departments had 32 beds, the patient rooms had six beds and the common toilets and bathrooms were on the hallways. At first the departments were divided among men and women so that the departments on the southern end were assigned for women and those on the northern end for men. Patients summoned to the hospital entered through the bathroom department, where they originally washed themselves before coming to the bedplace departments. There originally was no break room for the staff, instead the staff had their daily coffee break in the doctor's office, with the doctor often working at the same time. Patients were allowed to smoke either on the department balcony or in the lobby up to the 1980s.

== In popular culture ==
The entrance lobby of the Meilahti Hospital has served as the place of a chase scene in Matti Kassila's 1969 film Vodkaa, komisario Palmu. Neil Hardwick's crime comedy series Musta tuntuu (1985) was shot at the laboratory of the department of pathology at the Meilahti Hospital.

== Repairs 2011 to 2015 ==
The Meilahti Tower Hospital underwent basic repairs in summer 2011. This required emptying the entire vast hospital. Moving the functions of the hospital to other HUCH hospitals, such as the Triangle Hospital that had just been completed started already in autumn 2010. The repairs were completed in November 2014. In order to empty the tower hospital, a temporary bedplace hospital was built next to it, which was completed in summer 2011 when repairs at the Meilahti Tower Hospital started. The expansion of the underground tunnel network was continued. The repairs were designed by the Architect Bureau SARC Oy and the Architect Group Reino Koivula Oy.

After the renewal, the patient tower has identical bedplace departments in 11 floors containing a total of 336 bedplaces which is only little more than a third of what it had in the 1960s. Intensive care places have been increased to 51 and many clinical support functions have been redesigned, such as two intensive care units, the neurology outpatient clinic and office, education and conference spaces. The patient rooms now have no more than three bedplaces each and each room has its own toilet and shower. This allows patients to have more privacy and infection safety has increased.

The facade of the Meilahti Tower Hospital was protected with an SR-2 designation in 2006, so the hospital got a double facade during its repairs. This improved the building's energy efficiency and preserved its original appearance. The windows were also changed to more modern ones. The new double facade with its insulation layer is about 30 cm thicker than the old outer wall structure. In relation to the size of the building the difference in the cityscape image is fairly minor.

Before the repairs the hospital employed about 1840 nurses and about 730 medical doctors and about 1100 other hospital care professionals. The estimated number of people per day is about 700 staff members and about 600 patients.

The laboratory wing of the hospital has been demolished. The new Bridge Hospital was built in 2023 between the Meilahti Tower Hospital and the Paciuksenkatu street. The cancer clinic underwent basic repairs from 2020 to 2025.
