= HUS Helsinki University Hospital =

- The Bridge Hospital in the Meilahti hospital area, Helsinki, in 2026.

Geography
- Location: Uusimaa, Finland

Organisation
- Type: University hospital network
- Affiliated university: University of Helsinki

History
- Founded: 1958 (as HYKS)

Links
- Website: www.hus.fi/en/
- Lists: Hospitals in Finland

HUS Helsinki University Hospital (HUS; Finnish: HUS Helsingin yliopistollinen sairaala, Swedish: HUS Helsingfors universitetssjukhus) is a hospital network operated by the HUS Joint Authority (HUS-yhtymä), responsible for specialised healthcare in Uusimaa. Its predecessors were HYKS, which began operating in 1958, and the HUS Hospital District of 2000; the current joint authority started operating in 2023. In 2025 the network treated about 711,000 patients and employed about 26,500 people.

== Name ==
The full name of the hospital network is HUS Helsinki University Hospital, abbreviated HUS (Swedish: HUS Helsingfors universitetssjukhus). The same name is used as the marketing name by the HUS Joint Authority.

According to the Institute for the Languages of Finland, using the hospital's name for the whole joint authority is in many contexts awkward or misleading, because the authority operates throughout Uusimaa and also has national duties.

The name Helsingin seudun yliopistollinen keskussairaala (HYKS, Helsinki University Central Hospital) refers to the central hospital operating in 1958–1999 and later to the HYKS hospital area of the HUS Hospital District.

== History ==
According to HUS's own historical account, its university-hospital heritage dates to the 1830s, and patients have been treated in Helsinki city hospitals and Uusimaa regional hospitals since the 19th century. The current hospital network is based on HYKS (founded 1958), the HUS Hospital District (formed 2000) and the HUS Joint Authority (started 2023).

=== HYKS 1958–1999 ===
The Helsinki University Central Hospital began operating on 1 March 1958, when several hospital properties were transferred to it. In 1991–1999 it served as the joint central hospital of the Helsinki and Uusimaa hospital districts.

=== HUS Hospital District 2000–2022 ===
The HUS Hospital District (the joint municipal authority of the Helsinki and Uusimaa hospital districts) started operating on 1 January 2000, when the Uusimaa and Helsinki hospital districts and the Helsinki University Central Hospital joint authority were merged. Its hospital areas were HYKS as well as Hyvinkää, Lohja, Western Uusimaa and Porvoo.

=== HUS Joint Authority from 2023 ===
In the health and social services reform, hospital districts were abolished. The assets, liabilities and obligations of the HUS Hospital District were transferred to the HUS Joint Authority, which started on 1 January 2023 and whose members are the City of Helsinki and the wellbeing services counties of Western, Central and Eastern Uusimaa and Vantaa-Kerava.

Several changes took place in the service network in 2023–2026:

- Meilahti Bridge Hospital entered service on 23 January 2023, with an official opening ceremony held on 18 January 2023. The entrance to the Meilahti joint emergency department was moved to the Bridge Hospital in 2024. Bridge Hospital took over some of the functions of Töölö Hospital.
- Oak Hospital, the ophthalmology hospital in Meilahti, admitted its first patients on 12 May 2025. It treats about 1,000 patients per day and performs about 85 procedures per weekday.
- The new five-storey ward building of Jorvi Hospital was completed in January 2026, when SRV handed the premises over to HUS on 20 January 2026. The new main entrance opened in spring 2026, and ward operations were phased in from late August 2026. Maternity, adult and children's specialist wards and support services moved into the building from the Jorvi ward towers, separate buildings on the hospital campus and Espoo Hospital. Maternity services at Espoo Hospital were transferred to Jorvi Hospital on 1 September 2026 at 09:00.
- Orton started operating as HUS's public hip and knee replacement hospital on 1 April 2026. The joint authority board approved its establishment on 12 January 2026, after orthopaedic waiting lists had grown sharply: 1,760 patients had waited more than six months at the end of November 2025. At the same time, Orton Oy ceased operating as a private hospital. Joint-replacement surgery is gradually being concentrated at Orton from the Hyvinkää, Lohja, Porvoo and Peijas hospitals.

== Administration ==
The network is operated by the HUS Joint Authority, in which the highest decision-making power is held by the General Meeting, which elects the Executive Board. Day-to-day operations are led by the chief executive officer. The General Meeting consists of five representatives appointed by the Uusimaa wellbeing services counties and the City of Helsinki and meets at least twice a year. The Executive Board has 17 members, two of whom represent the University of Helsinki. On 17 June 2026 the General Meeting approved the 2025 financial statements and annual report, granted discharge from liability to the board and the CEO, and set the 2027 budget framework at €2,476.1 million. In 2026 the chief executive officer is Matti Bergendahl.

== Funding ==
The City of Helsinki and the Uusimaa wellbeing services counties fund operations from the central-government funding they receive. The HUS Joint Authority does not receive direct central-government funding. In 2025 the funding allocation received from the Uusimaa wellbeing services counties and the City of Helsinki was €2.28 billion excluding deficit coverage. The remaining roughly €1 billion came from patient charges, income from services sold to other regions and research funding.

Advance information on the 2025 financial statements, published on 30 January 2026, was unaudited and subject to change. According to the advance information, HUS balanced its finances and covered the 2022–2024 deficits totalling €141.7 million. The 2025 result was €21.8 million better than budgeted, and operating costs rose by 0.1 per cent.

According to the final financial statements, the surplus for the financial year was €163.4 million. Operating income was about €3.26 billion and operating costs about €2.95 billion. The savings and adjustment programme generated savings of €152.4 million, exceeding the €140 million target. According to the advance information, the statements were scheduled to be signed on 23 March 2026.

According to HUS's own advance information, the estimated cost of clearing the treatment backlog ("care debt") was about €65 million in 2023 and €35 million at the end of 2025.

On 9 October 2025 the National Supervisory Authority for Welfare and Health (Valvira) ordered HUS to remedy access to non-urgent specialised care by 30 April 2026, backed by an €8.5 million conditional fine. Valvira's duties were transferred to the Licence and Oversight Authority (Lupa- ja valvontavirasto), which was established on 1 January 2026. On 1 July 2026 the supervisory authority found that HUS had breached the order to provide timely access to non-urgent specialized medical care and considered a €3 million fine reasonable. HUS was given until 15 October 2026 to respond. According to Valvira's monitoring, the care debt was €58.8 million on 31 March 2024 and €37.7 million on 31 March 2025. The matter was still pending in October 2026.

== Functions ==
The HUS Joint Authority performs the statutory university-hospital duties under the Act on the Organisation of Health and Social Services (612/2021) and the HUS organisation agreement. HUS is responsible for highly specialised healthcare, while primary healthcare is the responsibility of the City of Helsinki and the wellbeing services counties. Access to specialised care generally requires a referral. Emergency services are provided by the Meilahti joint emergency department and the Jorvi, Peijas, Hyvinkää, Lohja, Porvoo and Raseborg emergency departments.

Services centralised nationally at HUS include, among others, organ transplantation, complex neurosurgery, paediatric cardiac surgery, cleft lip and palate surgery and the treatment of severe burns. Centralisation is governed by the Government Decree on the division of labour in specialised healthcare and the centralisation of certain duties. The HUS Joint Authority is part of the Southern Finland collaborative area.

== Organisation ==
In the 2023 organisational reform, the area-based model was abandoned in favour of a speciality-based model. Patient care is divided into the following branches:

- Acute care
- Diagnostic Centre
- Children’s and adolescent medicine
- Operating theatres and intensive care
- Gynaecology and obstetrics
- Neurocentre
- Psychiatry
- Head and Neck Centre
- Internal medicine and rehabilitation
- Heart and Lung Centre
- Comprehensive Cancer Center
- Musculoskeletal and plastic surgery
- Inflammation Centre
- Abdominal Centre

== Hospitals ==
In 2026 the network comprised the following hospitals:

- Comprehensive Cancer Center
- Corner Hospital
- Psychiatry Center
- Hyvinkää Hospital
- Jorvi Hospital
- Lohja Hospital
- Meilahti Bridge Hospital
- Meilahti Tower Hospital
- Meilahti Triangle Hospital
- New Children's Hospital
- Oak Hospital
- Ohkola Hospital
- Joint Replacement Hospital Orton
- Park Hospital
- Peijas Hospital
- Porvoo Hospital
- Raseborg Hospital
- Skin and Allergy Hospital
- Surgical Hospital
- Women's Hospital

== Scale of operations ==
According to HUS, it is Finland's largest specialised-healthcare provider by patient and staff numbers. The figures are advance information on the 2025 financial statements, unless otherwise stated.

| Indicator | 2024 | 2025 (advance information) |
|---|---|---|
| Patients treated (as defined in the advance information) | 706,397 | 711,216 |
| Outpatient visits | 2,992,356 | 2,994,755 |
| Surgical procedures (Note: The audited figure for 2024 is 91,572; the advance-information comparator was 91,569.) | 91,572 | 94,560 |
| Laboratory tests (Note: The 2024 figure of about 25.5 million is the sum of the 2024 breakdown's laboratory categories (pathology, sampling, clinical physiology, neurophysiology, genetics, chemistry and haematology, blood products, microbiology); radiology is excluded from both figures.) | about 25.5 million | about 25 million tests |
| Imaging examinations | 1,178,368 | about 1.2 million examinations |
| Deliveries | 15,530 | 16,163 (+4.1%) |
| Babies born | 15,732 | 16,397 (+4.3%) |
| Transplants (Note: In 2025 there were 159 donors in total: 131 deceased organ donors and 28 living kidney donors.) | 449 (20 in children) | 410 (14 in children) |
| Net Promoter Score (NPS), full year | 80 | 83 |
| Specialised care within the healthcare guarantee period, 31 December | – | 93% |
| Patients waiting more than six months, 31 December | 6,713 | 5,283 |
| Number of staff in December (advance information) | 27,051 | 26,481 |

In 2025 the staff comprised about 14,400 nurses, 3,800 doctors, 2,500 special-category employees and 5,900 other employees. There were 24,490 person-years. Turnover excluding retirements was 4.9 per cent, and sickness absences averaged 14.6 days per person.

In the first quarter of 2026 the number of patients waiting more than six months for treatment halved to 2,507 (March 2025: 5,265), and the estimated cost of clearing the treatment backlog was about €17.4 million at the end of March. The Net Promoter Score was 84, and the strategic goal is the highest patient satisfaction among Finnish university hospitals and wellbeing services counties in 2026.

== Research, teaching and development ==
As a university hospital, HUS collaborates with the University of Helsinki on research and teaching. In 2025 about 2,000 studies were under way. HUS received €11.4 million in central-government research funding (VTR) for 97 projects in total.

Since 2024 the HUS Joint Authority has been implementing a joint ISO 9001 quality-management system for the whole organisation. The first units were certified on 25 March 2026, and certification of the whole organisation is targeted for early 2027.

The joint authority was admitted to the European University Hospital Alliance (EUHA) in November 2024. It held the presidency of the alliance from November 2025 to May 2026.

According to HUS's 2025 sustainability report, its carbon footprint decreased by more than 8 per cent in 2020–2024.

== See also ==
- HUS Joint Authority
- List of hospitals in Finland
- University hospital
