= Turku University Hospital =

Hospital in Turku, Finland

- Hospital District of Southwest Finland
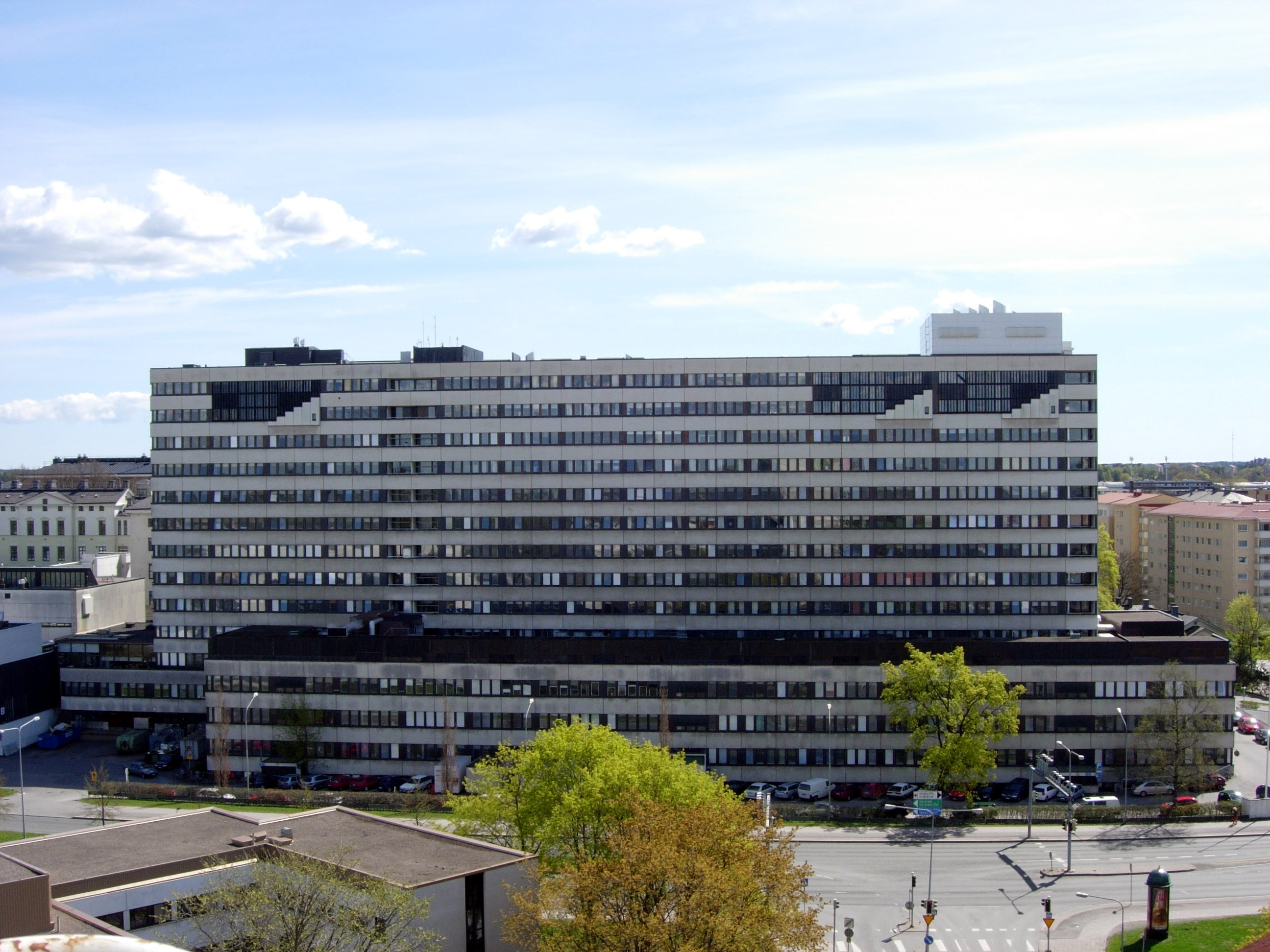
- The U-part is the largest building of the Turku University Hospital

Geography
- Location: Kiinamyllynkatu 4–8, Turku, Turku, FI
- Coordinates: 60°27′12″N 022°17′26″E

Organisation
- Type: Teaching
- Affiliated university: University of Turku

Services
- Emergency department: Yes
- Beds: 900

Helipads
- Helipad: ICAO: EFTV

History
- Founded: 1756

Links
- Website: www.tyks.fi

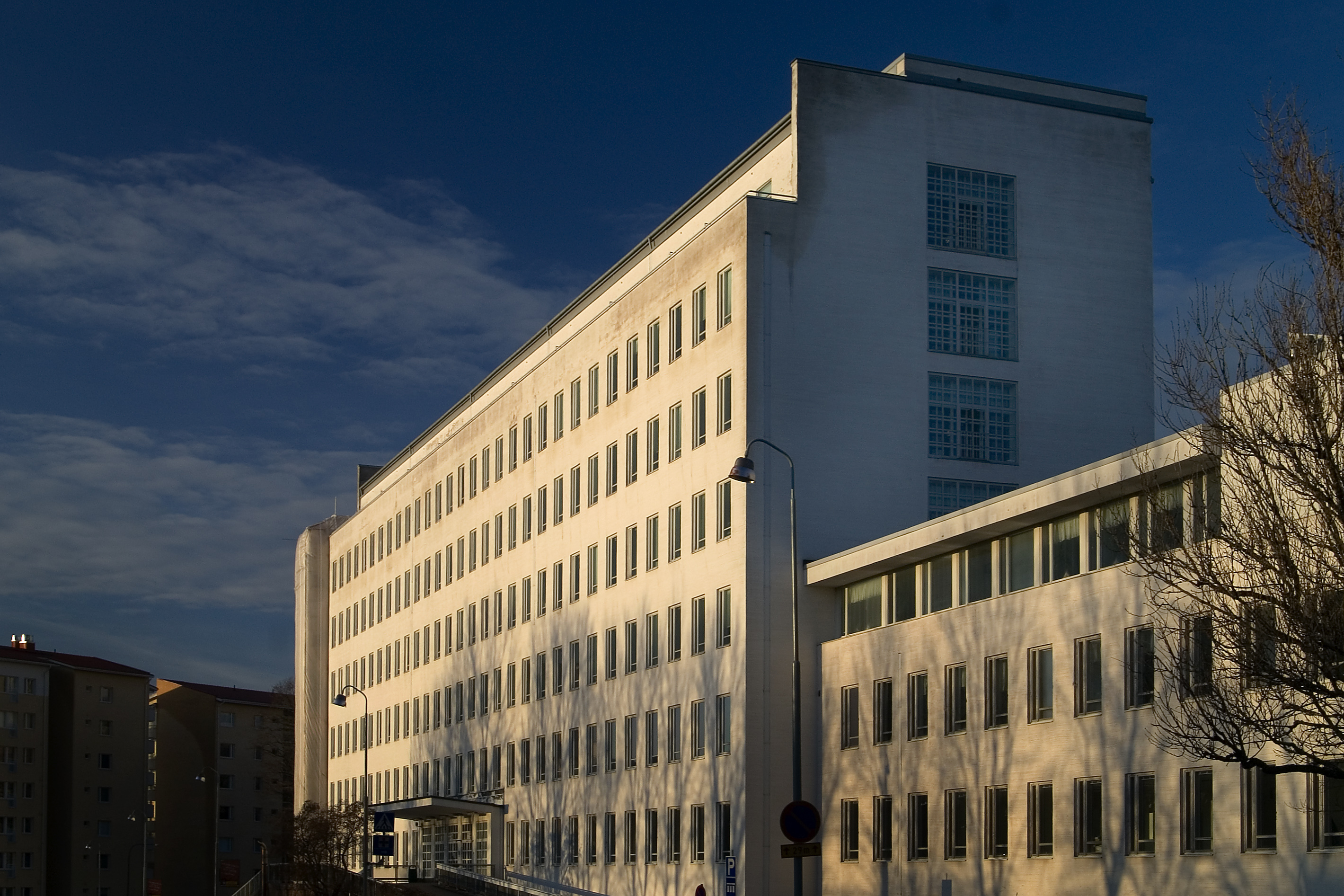
A-part of TYKS

Turku University Hospital (Finnish: Turun yliopistollinen keskussairaala, TYKS, Swedish: Åbo universitetscentralsjukhus, ÅUCS) is a hospital in Turku, Finland.

== General information ==
The hospital serves as the central hospital for southwestern Finland. It is located near the city centre of Turku and the university, and has branches in the nearby town of Raisio.

The hospital is owned and operated by the Hospital District of Southwest Finland which is a joint municipal authority responsible for production of specialized medical services in the region.

The hospital has been affiliated with the University of Turku since 1958 and it is used as a teaching hospital by the Faculty of Medicine. Approximately 1,500 students in medicine and nursery practice there every year.

Having been founded in 1756, it is the second oldest hospital, still in use, in the Nordic countries, after Rigshospitalet in Copenhagen.

The hospital complex includes the Turku PET-centre, a large and advanced PET facility.

There has been significant concern over the poor condition of the U-part hospital building, which has had severe air quality issues over the years, including mold and dampening of the structure. Multiple renovations have been carried out, but they have not been able to fully address the extensive issues found in the building.

== Expansion ==
T-hospital is new part of TYKS and its construction was started 2007 and it is still under construction. In 2009 the construction of first part (part-D) was finished and it's now operational. The whole complex became operational in the end of 2012. When finished T-hospital will consist of 160,000 square metres (1,700,000 sq ft) of floor space and a helipad. Further expansion is ongoing due to the poor condition of the U-part. There have been reports of severe indoor air quality issues, specifically concerning the almost 60 year old U-building. In 2015 the City of Turku approved plans to allow its demolition.

== Statistics ==
The hospital has 900 beds and its operating volumes were in 2009 as follows:

- 414,447 outpatient visits 2008
- 245,023 inpatient days of care 2008
- 57,567 episodes of hospital care 2008

The mean duration of treatment in 2008 was 4.3 days.

The yearly operating costs for the hospital are 369,2 million euros according to the budget for the fiscal year of 2009.

The hospital has a staff of 3,993. The breakdown of the staff is as follows:

- 481 medical doctors
- 48 amanuensis
- 55 academic research and nursing personnel
- 2,325 nursing and paramedical personnel
- 1,084 administrative, financial and service personnel
