= Helsinki harbour rail =

Dismantled railway in Helsinki, Finland

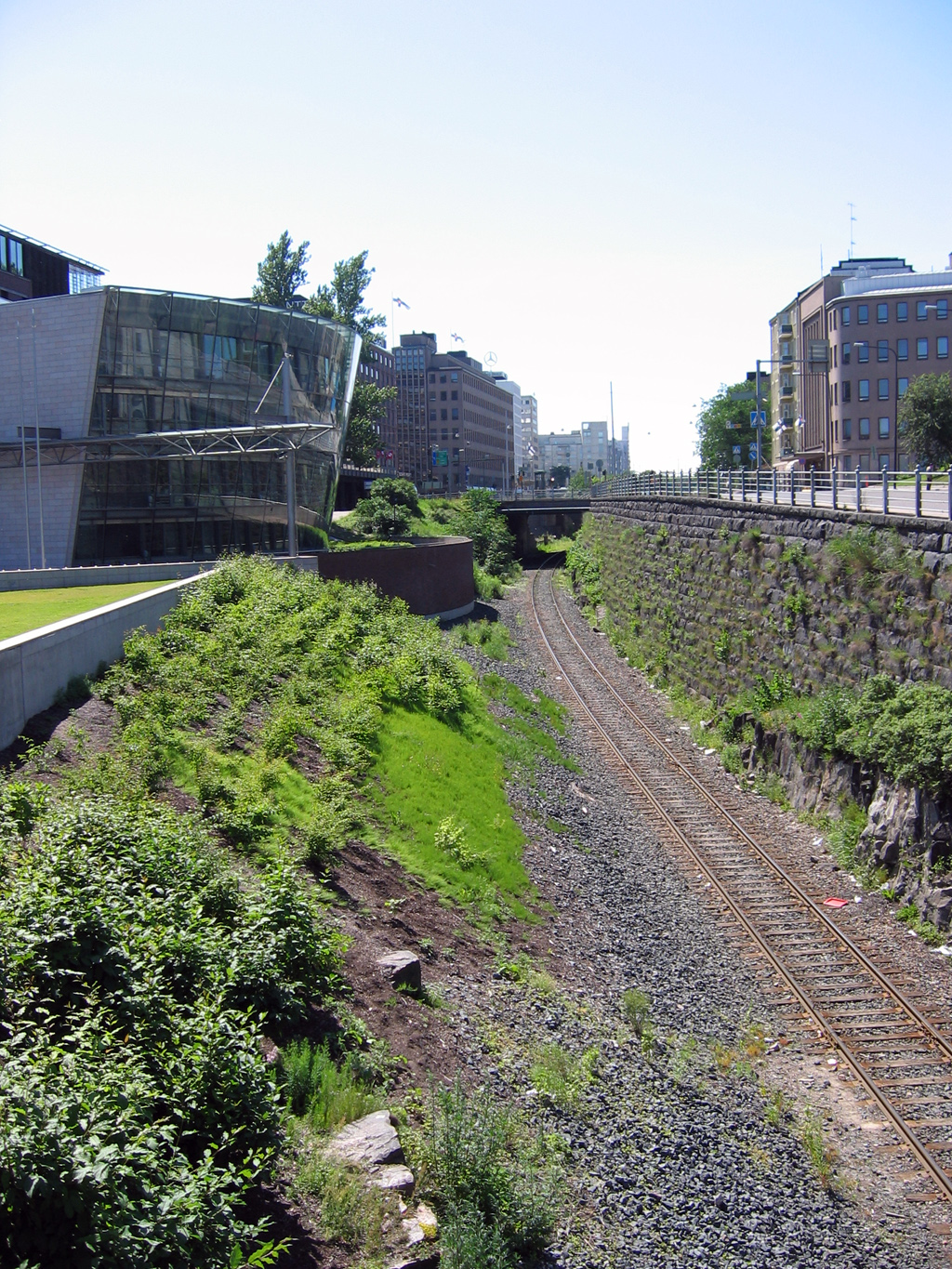
A view from Mannerheimintie bridge towards the chasm and harbour in 2007.

The Helsinki harbour rail line (Finnish: Helsingin satamarata) was a side rail track in Helsinki, Finland, built in the 1890s, and dismantled in 2009. Originally it led from the Helsinki Central railway station, via the city's coastline, to Katajanokka. Its original length was 7 kilometres (4.3 mi), but in its final stage, its length was only about 3 kilometres (1.9 mi). In the final phase the track had two level crossings and a rail yard in the Länsisatama (West Harbour). Near the start of the track were the former VR warehouses. It was used only by trains going to the harbour and Hietalahti shipyard, but special request trains have also travelled the track.

== History ==
=== Early history and expansion ===
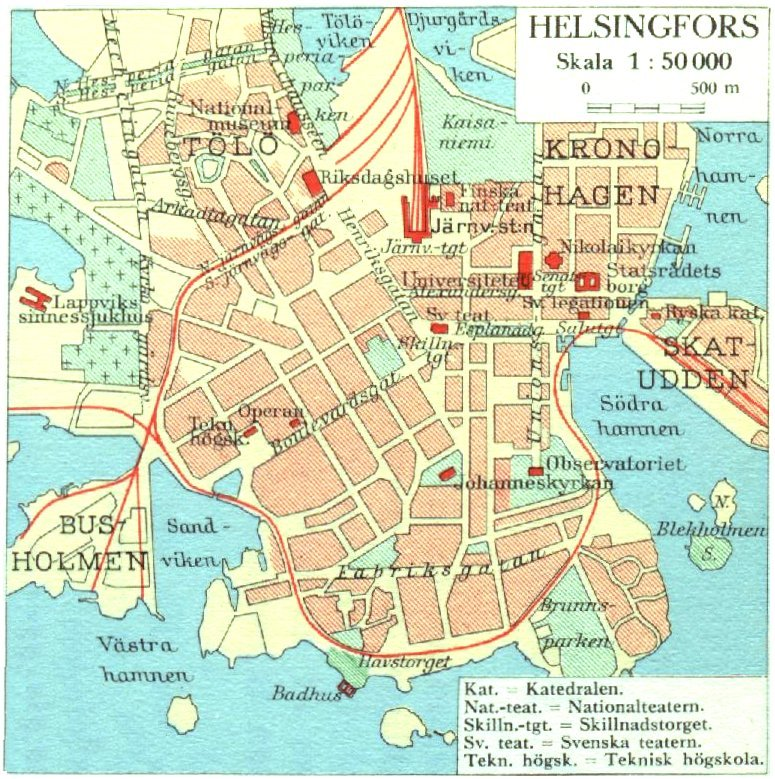
The railway and its sidings in 1930, marked with red.

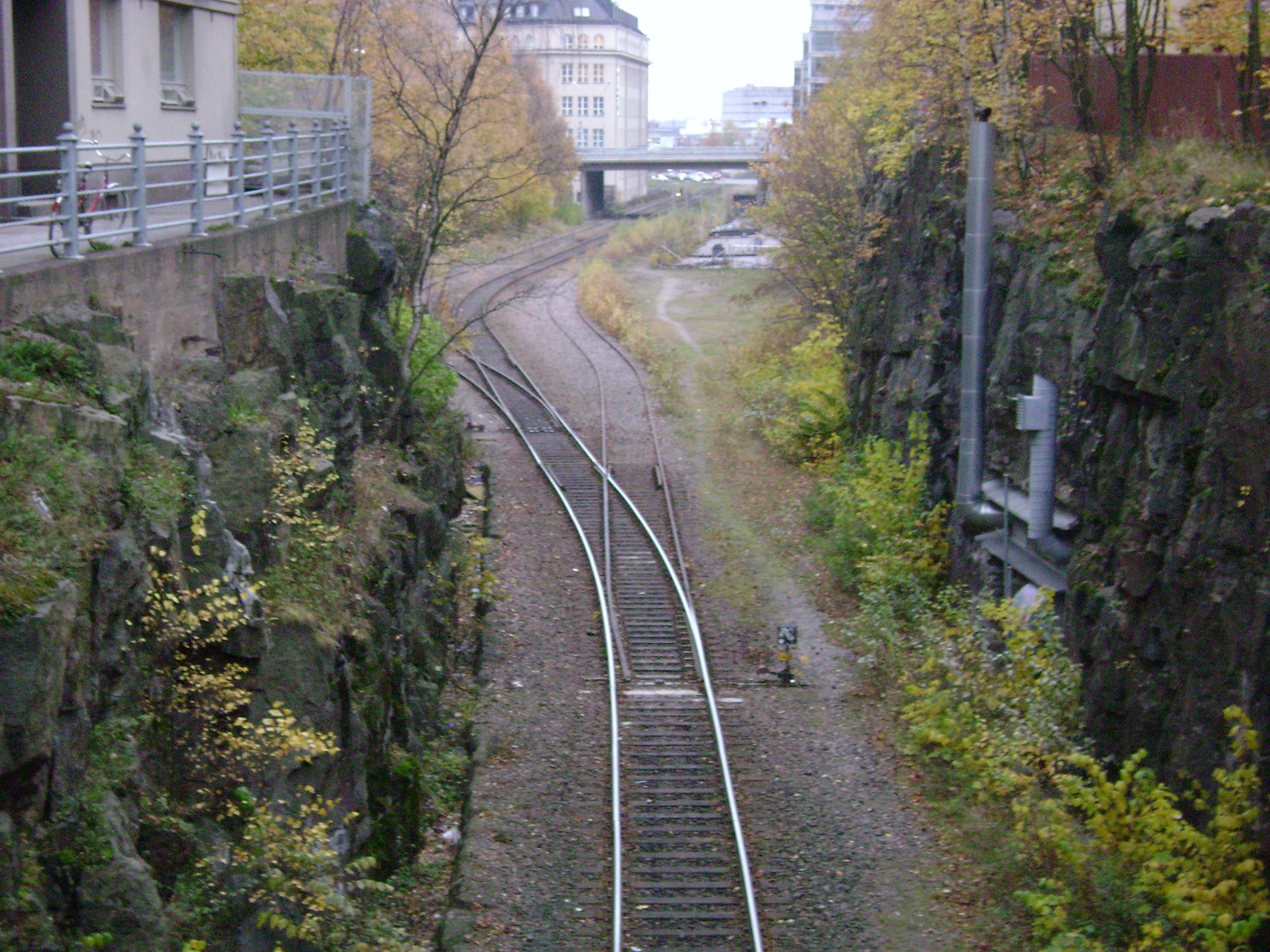
A view of a former rail yard near Maria Hospital in 2007, facing south.

The construction of the harbour rail began in 1891, although the first plans for the track had been made in 1870. The first train to Eteläsatama ran in December 1893 and the line was inaugurated in the next spring, on 8 April 1894, when it reached the Old Market Hall near the Market Square. The extension of the rails to Katajanokka was completed in September 1895. The length of the new track was 5.49 kilometres (3.41 mi) and it included 4.292 kilometres (2.667 mi) of side tracks. The track also included Finland's first, 74 metres (243 ft) long, railway tunnel in Kaivopuisto, and the bridge under Mannerheimintie was Finland's first concrete bridge.

Originally, the track began at Helsinki rail depot and VR warehouses, then ran under Heikinkatu (after Winter War called Mannerheimintie) and continued in a cutting to Ruoholahti. From Ruoholahti the track went via Hietalahti to Merisatama (Ullanlinna) in the middle of Telakkakatu and from there onwards along the edge of Kaivopuisto to the tip of Katajanokka. It was then around 7 kilometres (4.3 mi) long. There were five locations with sidings: Ruoholahti, Länsisatama, Merisatama, Eteläsatama and Katajanokka. Katajanokka, Eteläsatama and Merisatama were built when the line was built, the other two were built as Länsisatama developed later on. The track had a tunnel south of the Olympiaterminaali, and at the Market Square there were two turning bridges at the Cholera basin and at the Katajanokka canal, and one in Hietalahti. The first 1.5 kilometres (0.93 mi) were without level crossings because of running in a cutting, but there were several level crossings between Ruoholahti and Katajanokka. The most famous level crossing was the one for pedestrians in Kaivopuisto. Two children were involved in a level crossing accident in May 1913 and died. For decades, even until 1980's, someone made crosses in the ballast sand between sleepers on the site of the accident. There are lots of preserved pictures of the crosses. It is not known to date who made the crosses.

In the 1950s, it was possible that some week's last train, carrying a heavy load of coal cargo, was pulled from Jätkäsaari to Pasila by two Vr3 engines, causing even the windows of Eduskuntatalo to shake and the cutting between the two parallel Rautatienkatu (Railway Street) streets to fill with black coal smoke. Even in the middle 1970s one could see the supervisor engine of the harbour in the middle of the Market Square going to fetch cargo cars from Katajanokka, or pushing a long line of cars over the Market Square turning bridge in either direction. The track did not have official stations or stops, because its main use was cargo traffic, passenger traffic was agreed separately each time, including a separate train sender; most of the time the place of agreement was in Katajanokka.

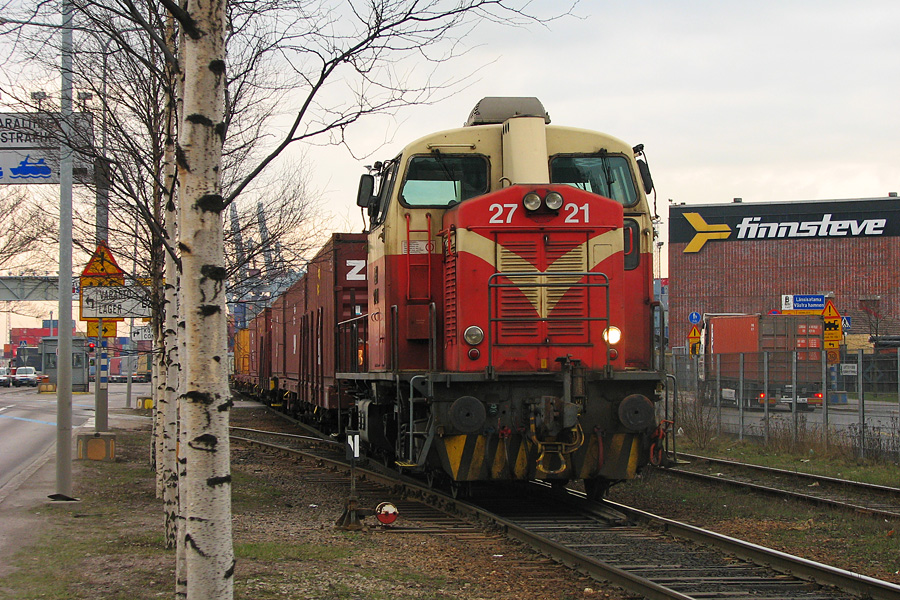
Diesel engines were used to haul cargo from the harbour.

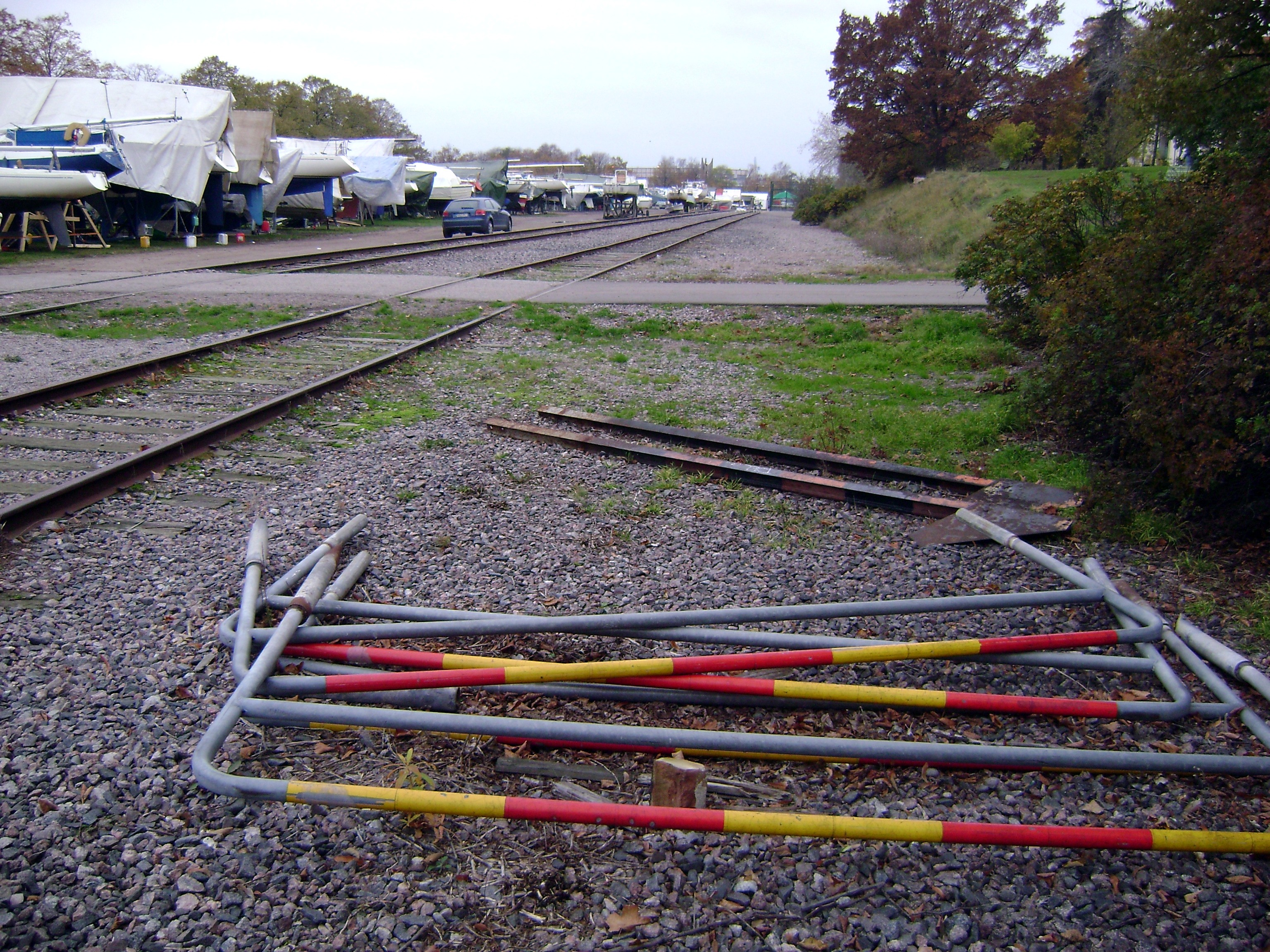
The sidings in Merisatama before dismantling in 2007.

=== Closure of Eteläsatama branch ===
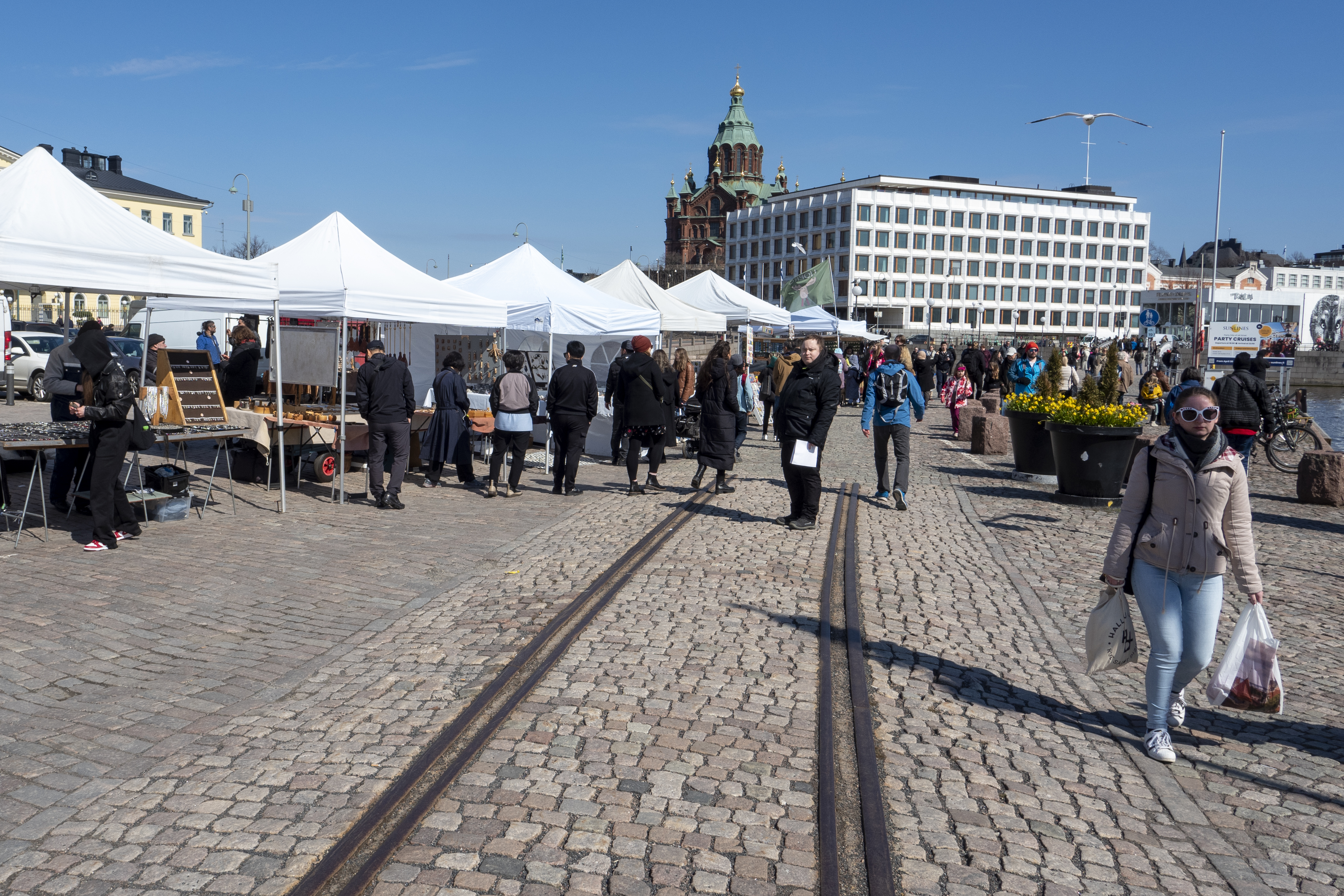
Small part of the rail tracks that were used for cargo traffic to Katajanokka have been preserved to this day at the Market Square.

After Eteläsatama was assigned solely to passenger traffic, the harbour cranes and the track were dismantled in 1972. When the Finnjet was built, there was a public presentation of a plan to put the harbour rail to passenger use in a similar way as in Turku, where passenger trains go to the harbour. These plans were not realised, as the first part of this line was dismantled from the front of the Finnjet terminal in Katajanokka in 1977. The cargo traffic to Katajanokka finally ended on 1 May 1980.

The Eteläsatama branch was closed with a stop disc at the eastern end of Merisatama rail yard, but the track leading to Eteläsatama remained in place, disused, for several years. The track to Katajanokka was dismantled by 1985, and in 1989 the turning bridge crossing the Katajanokka canal was replaced by a pedestrian bridge. At the same time, the part of the track on the edge of Kaivopuisto was dismantled. The tunnel still exists, but Merisatama end of it has been filled in. The last passenger train to visit Katajanokka was a Dm9 unit, travelling on request. Despite the dismantling of the track from Merisatama onwards, a short spur of track has survived in the Market Square.

Commemorating the track is a water supply crane in Katajanokka, adored with a memorial plaque. Also the swing bridge of Cholera basin is preserved. It is closed during winter and open all time during ice-free season.

=== Closure of Salmisaari and shipyard branches ===
The part of the track leading from Ruoholahti to the Merisatama sidings, and the spur track from there to the Hietalahti shipyard, were in use until 2005. This track was lifted in July 2008. The swing bridge in Hietalahti has been preserved. It is open all time during ice-free season as the Hietalahti basin has a harbour for small craft.

In 1925, there was also a side track from Ruoholahti to Salmisaari. It was used for cargo traffic for the Alko factories and the Nokia cable factory. These side tracks were dismantled from 1990 to 1993. Also the harbour tracks on the eastern edge of Jätkäsaari were dismantled in the 1990s.

=== Final closure ===
In the last years the harbour rail served only Länsisatama and consisted mostly of container traffic. The number of sidings near Maria Hospital was reduced and during final years there was only one through track in use. The surviving part of the track was dismantled in May 2009, after the harbour facilities were moved from Länsisatama to Vuosaari Harbour. There were many plans for future use for the deep cutting between Pohjoinen Rautatienkatu and Eteläinen Rautatienkatu (Northern Railway Street and Southern Railway Street). The cutting was included in plan of Helsinki Center Tunnel for vehicle traffic, but construction of the tunnel has been postponed. Other plans were a bicycle and pedestrian corridor or a light rail line.

The line in Eira from shipyard junction to mainline junction remained in place until entire line was dismantled. The rail path from Hietalahti to Eiranranta was for the most part converted to bike and pedestrian use and the site of former sidings in Merisatama has been turned into a park. It was used for boat winter storage before dismantling of last rails.

== Baana ==
For the railway cutting, of the three plans, the bicycle and pedestrian alternative prevailed in the end. The modification to bike and pedestrian use took several years. The name Baana (Finnish slang word for (rail)way coming from Swedish bana and German Bahn) for the new route was obtained through a naming competition. Baana was opened to the public on Helsinki Day, 12 June 2012.
