= Veikko =

Finnish given name

- Pronunciation: /ˈʋeikːo/
- Gender: Male
- Name day: 9 January

Origin
- Region of origin: Finland

Other names
- Related names: Veiko

Veikko is a male Finnish given name. Notable people with the name include:

- Veikko Aaltonen (born 1955), Finnish director, editor, sound editor, and production manager
- Veikko Asikainen (1918–2002), Finnish footballer
- Veikko Ennala (1922–1991), Finnish journalist
- Villle-Veikko Eerola (born 1992), Finnish ice hockey player
- Veikko Hakulinen (1925–2003), Finnish cross country skier and Olympic medalist
- Veikko Haukkavaara (1921–2004), Finnish artist
- Veikko Heinonen (1934–2015), Finnish ski jumper
- Veikko Aleksanteri Heiskanen (1894–1971), Finnish geodesist
- Veikko Helle (1911–2005), Finnish politician
- Veikko Huhtanen (1919–1976), Finnish gymnast
- Veikko Huovinen (1927–2009), Finnish novelist
- Veikko Hursti (1924–2005), Finnish philanthropist
- Veikko Huuskonen (1910–1963), Finnish boxer and Olympic competitor
- Veikko Hyytiäinen (1919–2000), Finnish politician
- Veikko Kankkonen (born 1940), Finnish ski jumper
- Veikko Kansikas (1923–1991), Finnish politician
- Veikko Karppinen (born 1986), Finnish ice hockey player
- Veikko Karvonen (1926–2007), Finnish athlete
- Veikko Antero Koskenniemi (1885–1962), member of the Finnish Academy
- Veikko Larkas (1909–1969), Finnish architect
- Veikko Lavi (1912–1996 ), Finnish singer, songwriter and author
- Veikko Lavonen (born 1945), Finnish wrestler and Olympic competitor
- Veikko Lommi (1917–1989), Finnish rower and Olympic medalist
- Risto-Veikko Luukkonen (1902–1972), Finnish architect
- Veikko Muronen (1927–2006), Finnish engineer heavy vehicle designer
- Veikko Pakarinen (1910–1987), Finnish gymnast and Olympic medalist
- Veikko Hannes Ruotsalainen (1908–1940), Finnish skier
- Veikko Salminen (born 1945), Finnish modern pentathlete, fencer and Olympic medalist
- Veikko Savela (1919–2015), Finnish agronomist
- Veikko "Jammu" Siltavuori (1926–2012), Finnish murderer and sexual offender
- Veikko Sinisalo (1926–2003), Finnish actor
- Veikko Suominen (1948–1978), Finnish ice hockey player
- Veikko Täär (born 1971), Estonian actor
- Veikko Törmänen (born 1945), Finnish painter
- Veikko Turunen (1930–2006), Finnish Lutheran clergyman and politician
- Veikko Uusimäki (1921–2008), Finnish actor and theater councilor
- Veikko Vennamo (1913–1997), Finnish politician.
