= List of Finnish architects =

The following is a list of notable architects from Finland.

== A–M ==
- Aino Aalto
- Alvar Aalto
- Waldemar Aspelin
- Pauli E. Blomstedt
- Erik Bryggman
- Marco Casagrande
- Hilding Ekelund
- Aarne Ervi
- Kristian Gullichsen
- Mikko Heikkinen
- Vilhelm Helander
- Signe Hornborg
- Aarne Hytönen
- Markku Komonen
- Juha Leiviskä
- Risto-Veikko Luukkonen
- Rainer Mahlamäki

== N–Z ==
- Usko Nyström
- Simo Paavilainen
- Juhani Pallasmaa
- Timo Penttilä
- Raili Pietilä
- Reima Pietilä
- Viljo Revell
- Aarno Ruusuvuori
- Eero Saarinen
- Eliel Saarinen
- Ebba-Stina Schalin-Hult
- Heikki Siren
- J. S. Sirén
- Kaija Siren
- Lars Sonck
- Matti Suuronen
- Jaakko Tähtinen
- Einari Teräsvirta
- Martti Välikangas
- Waldemar Wilenius

== See also ==
- List of architects
- List of Finns
