= Artistic director =

Artistic leader of a cultural institution

Speech by the artistic director Ralf Långbacka and the director Kalle Holmberg of Turku City Theatre in Turku, Finland (1971)

An artistic director is the executive of an arts organization, particularly in a theatre company or dance company, who handles the organization's artistic direction. They are generally a producer and director, but not in the sense of a mogul, since the organization is generally a nonprofit organization. The artistic director of a theatre company is the individual with the overarching artistic control of the theatre's production choices, directorial choices, and overall artistic vision. In smaller theatres, the artistic director may be the founder of the theatre and the primary director of its plays. In larger non-profit theatres (often known in Canada and the United States as regional theatres), the artistic director may be appointed by the board of directors.

== Overview ==
The artistic director of a performing dance company is similar to the musical director of an orchestra, the primary person responsible for planning a company's season. The artistic director's responsibilities can include (but are not limited to) choosing the material staged in a season, hiring creative/production personnel (such as directors), and other theatre management tasks. The artistic director may also direct productions for the company. Artistic directors work closely with the general manager of the theatre, and contribute to the artistic evaluation of projects and productions to be included in promotional, funding, and press materials. An artistic director also functions as a resource for the directors who are working to mount productions at the theatre and can provide support, counsel, and/or artistic input where requested. The artistic director is usually prepared to assume the production should the director become unable to complete his/her duties. Artistic directors are frequently regarded as the artistic representatives of theatre companies and are often required to speak about their theatre to the press. In the United States, artistic directors often have fundraising responsibilities as well.

In some ensemble companies, the artistic director is responsible for recruiting performers to act as a talent pool for the company's productions. This ensemble may include actors and artists of various disciplines. The artistic director functions as leader of this group, with the aim to create and/or realize various new and established works.

In ballet, the artistic director is the head of a ballet company. They have overall responsibility for training the dancers, as well as selecting and mounting productions. They are almost always a retired dancer. Often they also choreograph some of the company's productions.

In some companies, the artistic director may also manage the day-to-day operations of the company, but in many (particularly larger) companies, the artistic director is often exempt from routine administrative duties, freeing him or her to concentrate on the art. In those cases, decisions about administration, business issues, finances, fundraising, board relations, donor relations, publicity, and marketing devolve to the responsibility of the general manager, chief operating officer, managing director, etc. or are discussed collaboratively.
