= Karppinen =

Karppinen is a Finnish surname. Notable people with the surname include:

- Klaes Karppinen (1907–1992), Finnish cross-country skier
- Mika Karppinen, known as "Gas Lipstick" (born 1971), drummer
- Pertti Karppinen (born 1953), Finnish rower
- Sami Karppinen, drummer
- Timo Karppinen (born 1967), Finnish orienteering competitor
- Veikko Karppinen, Finnish ice hockey player
