= Veiko =

- Gender: Male
- Language: Estonian
- Name day: 9 January

Origin
- Region of origin: Estonia

Other names
- Related names: Veikko

Veiko is an Estonian masculine given name.

People named Veiko include:

- Veiko Belials (born 1966), Estonian writer and translator
- Veiko Lember (born 1977), Estonian volleyball player
- Veiko Õunpuu (born 1972), Estonian film director and screenwriter
- Veiko-Vello Palm (born 1971), Estonian brigadier general
- Veiko Porkanen (born 1989), Estonian actor
- Veiko Siimar (born 1941), Estonian swimmer
- Veiko Spolītis (born 1971), Latvian politician
