= Töölö Sports Hall =

Sports venue in Helsinki, Finland

- Finnish: Töölön kisahalli Swedish: Tölö sporthall
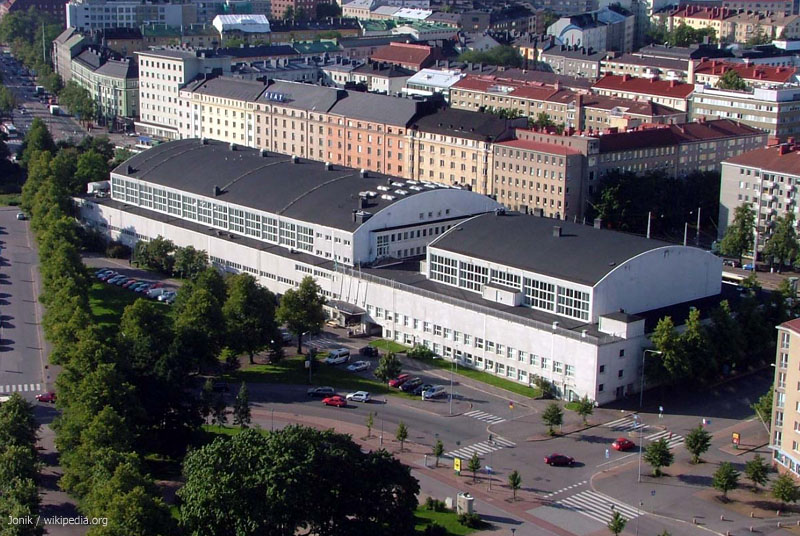
- Töölö Sports Hall photographed from the tower of the Olympic Stadium (2004)
- Interactive map of Töölö Sports Hall
- Former names: Messuhalli
- Address: Paavo Nurmen kuja 1c
- Location: Taka-Töölö, Helsinki, Finland
- Coordinates: 60°11′00″N 024°55′32″E
- Capacity: 2,000 (seated)

Construction
- Built: 1935
- Opened: 1935
- Expanded: 1952
- Architects: Aarne Hytönen; Risto-Veikko Luukkonen

Tenants
- Torpan Pojat; Helsinki Seagulls

Töölö Sports Hall (Finnish: Töölön kisahalli, Swedish: Tölö sporthall) is a sports venue located in the Töölö district of Helsinki, Finland. It was designed by Aarne Hytönen and Risto-Veikko Luukkonen and built in 1935 as Messuhalli (Exhibition Hall). It is located near the Olympic Stadium, the Opera House, and the Bolt Arena.

The hall was originally a venue for concerts, banquets and sporting events, but is now used only for training and competition in various sports.

== History ==
In preparation for the 1952 Summer Olympics the building was expanded on the northern side.

During the Olympics gymnastics, wrestling, boxing and weightlifting events as well as the basketball finals were held at the venue.

In June 1966 the hot pitch used to fix the hall's roof caught fire. The ensuing blaze almost destroyed the whole building but was eventually extinguished with the help of 175 firemen and the army, the latter of which kept the gathered crowds out of the way.

In 1975 the hall was moved to Helsinki city ownership and got its current name. It is the home arena of the basketball team Torpan Pojat and more recently the Helsinki Seagulls men's basketball team.

The hall is listed by Docomomo as a significant example of modern architecture in Finland.

== See also ==
- List of indoor arenas in Finland
- List of indoor arenas in Nordic countries
