= Maria Hospital =

Former hospital in Helsinki, Finland

Coordinates: 60°10′00″N 024°55′18″E

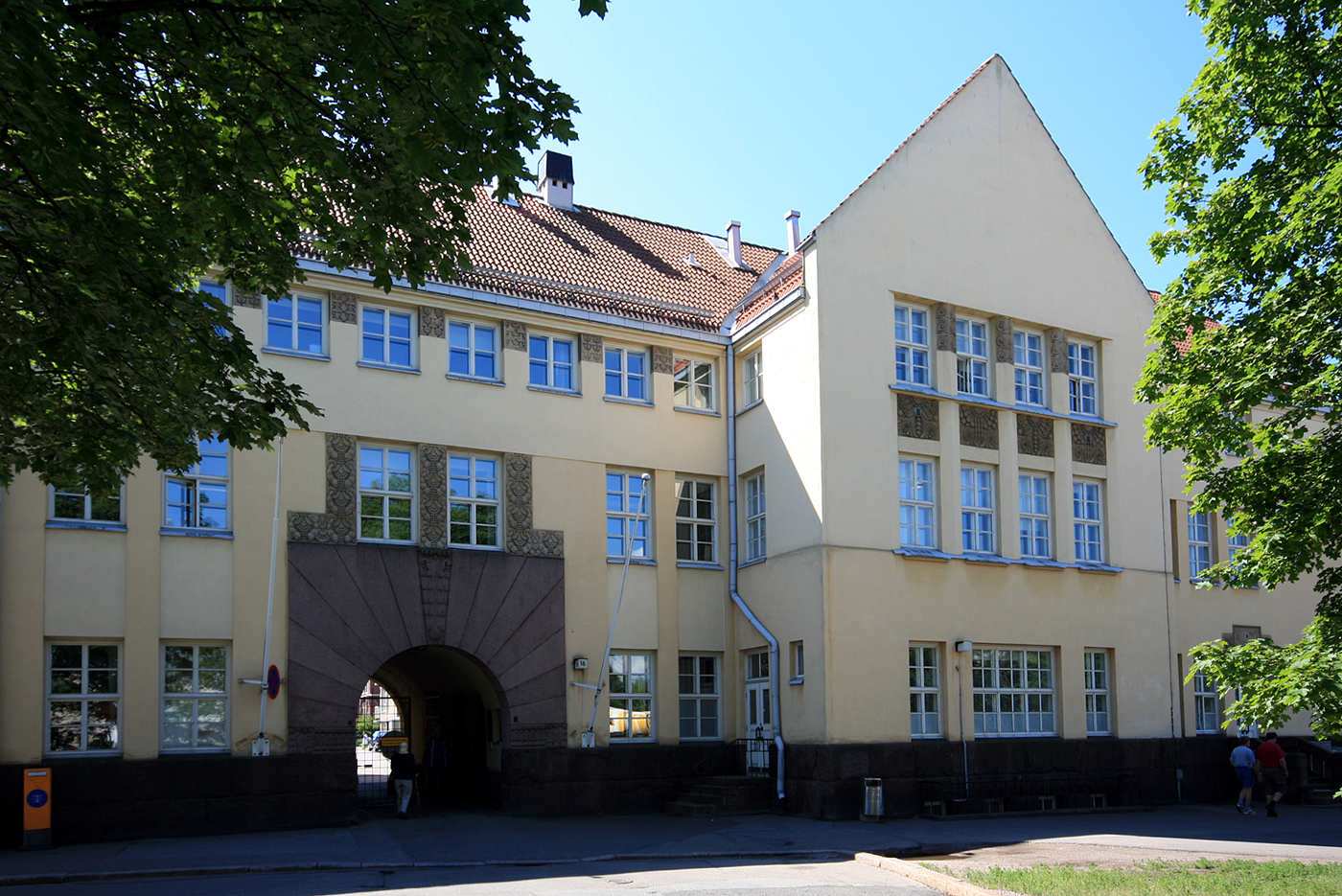
The main building of the Maria hospital.

The Maria Hospital (Finnish: Marian sairaala, Swedish: Maria sjukhus) was founded in Helsinki, Finland in the 19th century as a Russian military hospital. Since independence of Finland, the hospital has functioned as a hospital both of the City of Helsinki and of the hospital district of Helsinki and Uusimaa. Hospital functionalities in the Maria Hospital were discontinued in 2014. The Maria hospital has had long and close connections to the history of Finnish independence. The hospital was named after the wife of Emperor Alexander III of Russia, Maria Feodorovna. The hospital has included units for orthopedics and traumatology, urology, general and gastric surgery and a policlinic. The hospital performed surgery and even in the early 2000s performed artificial joint surgery, back surgery, trauma surgery and complicated gastric and general surgery and urology. In 2007, the hospital moved from the hospital district of Helsinki and Uusimaa mostly to the City of Helsinki, and only dialysis was performed under the central hospital of the hospital district. In its final phases, the hospital also included bed places.

The main building of the Maria hospital is located in Kamppi at the western end of the Lapinlahdenkatu street. Its lot is bordered by Mechelininkatu to the west and the remains of the Helsinki harbour rail, dismantled in 2009, to the east.

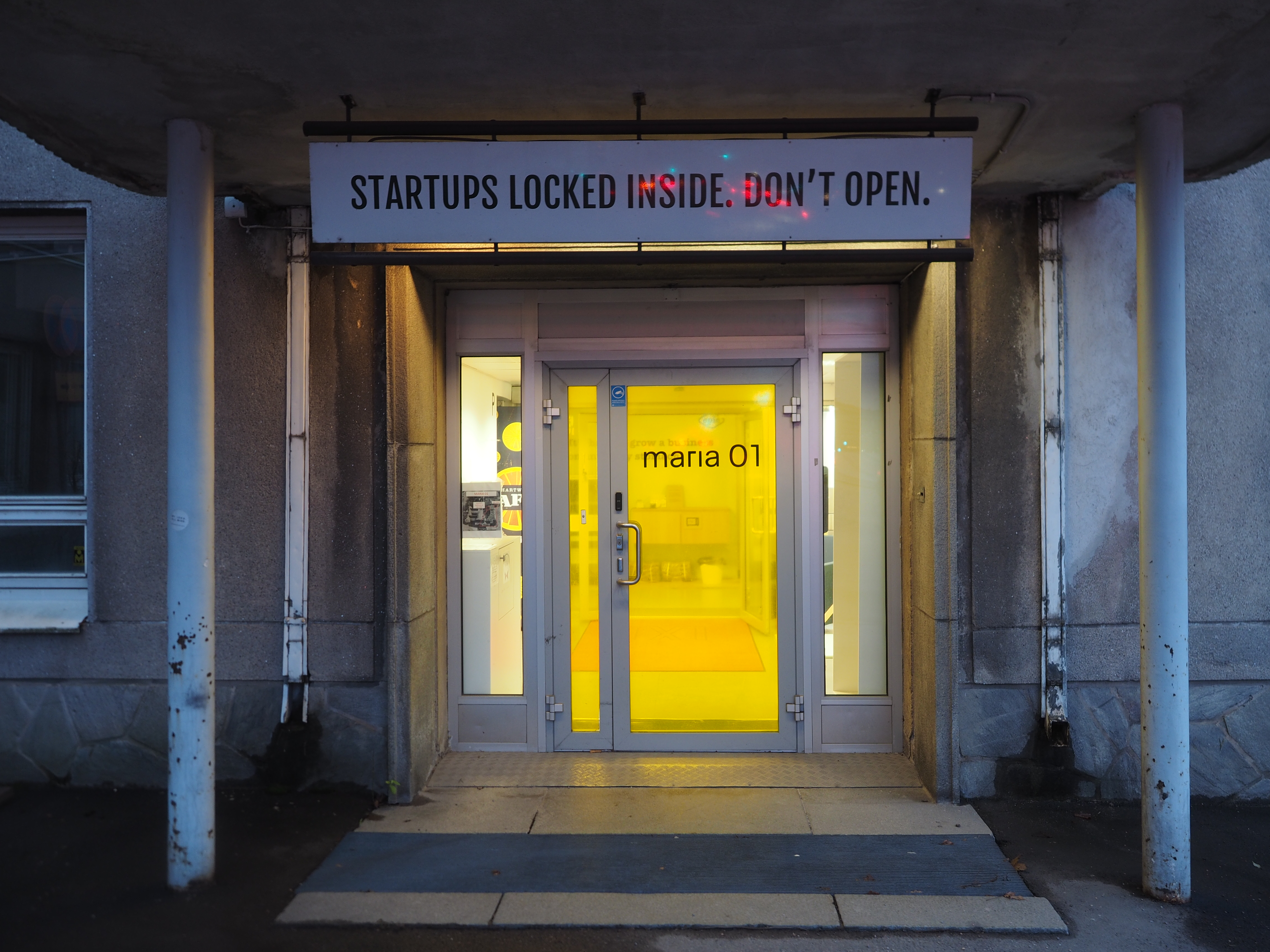
In 2016 the hospital premises were converted into the startup company complex Maria 01.

The hospital policlinic was discontinued in September 2009 when its functionalities were moved to the new Haartman Hospital in the Meilahti Hospital area. In 2016 the hospital premises were renovated and converted into the startup company complex Maria 01. The complex is owned by the City of Helsinki, the Startup foundation and the Startup company centre of Helsinki.
