= Herring fair =

Coordinates: 60°10′2.5″N 24°57′9″E

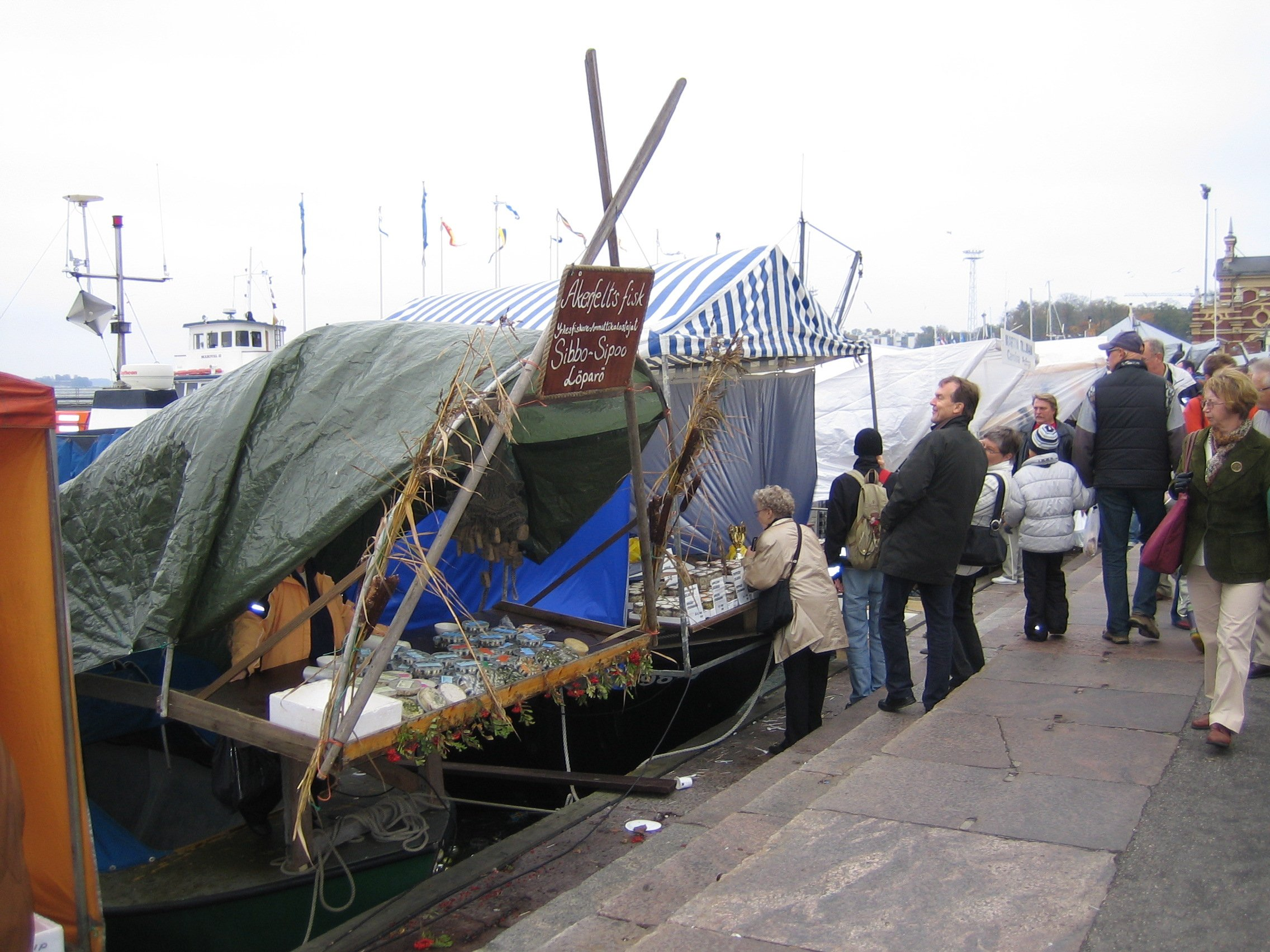
Helsinki herring market in 2007

The herring market or herring fair (Finnish: silakkamarkkinat, Swedish: strömmingsmarknad) is an annual event held in various cities in Finland, notably in Helsinki in October. During the Helsinki herring market, many archipelagoans arrive in the South Harbour to sell fish and other archipelago products directly from their boats. The event is organised by the city of Helsinki.

The first fair in Finland is considered to have been held in Turku in 1636. The Helsinki event is also very old; it said to have first been held in 1743. In 1820 its place was settled as the South Harbour.

The event has been forgotten from time to time, for various reasons, but in the 1980s it was revived and has become very popular.

In addition to the Helsinki and Turku fairs, the fair held at Rauma is also notable.
