= Turku City Theatre =

Theatre in Turku, Finland

- Turun kaupunginteatteri Åbo stadsteater
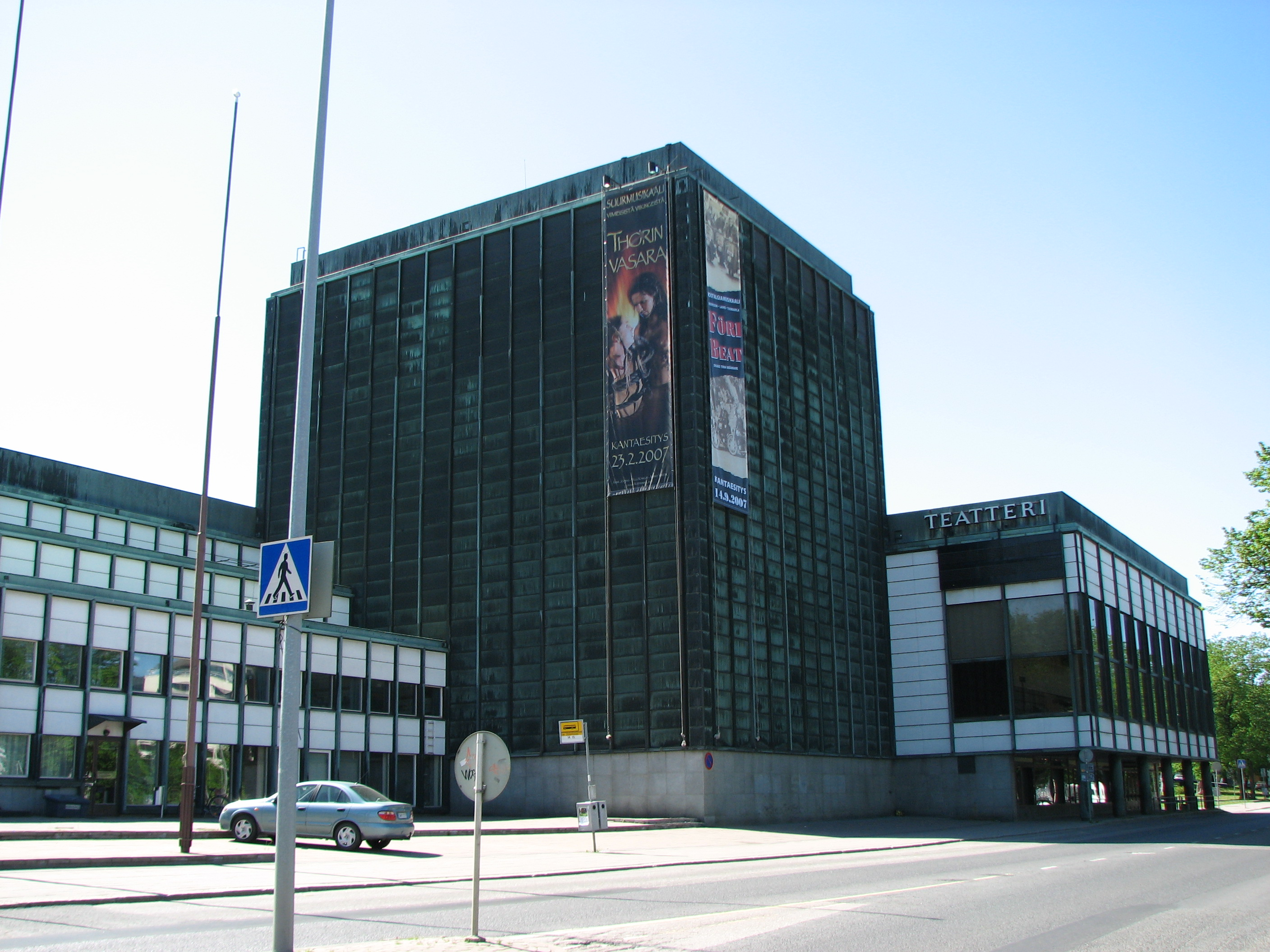
- Interactive map of Turku City Theatre
- Address: Itäinen Rantakatu 14, 20800; Turku; Finland
- Coordinates: 60.4460°N 22.2638°E
- Capacity: 815; 655 (Main Stage); 50–100 (Sopukka Stage); 60 (Pikkolo Stage)

Construction
- Groundbreaking: 1959
- Built: 1961
- Opened: 1962
- Renovated: 1996, 2014
- Architects: Aarne Hytönen, Risto-Veikko Luukkonen and Helmer Stenroos

Website
- https://teatteri.turku.fi/en

Turku City Theatre is a theatre in the City of Turku. It was founded in 1946, when "Turun Teatteri" and "Turun Työväen Teatteri" merged. It was the oldest fully municipality owned theatre in Finland, until 2014, when it became a joint-stock company owned by the City of Turku.

== Theatre directors ==
- Jorma Nortimo 1946–1958
- Jouko Paavola 1958–1963
- Kalervo Nissilä 1963–1968
- Kaija Siikala 1968–1972
- Ralf Långbacka (art director) and Kalle Holmberg (director) 1972–1977
- Jussi Valtakoski 1977
- Risto Saanila 1977–1981
- Taisto-Bertil Orsmaa 1981–1985
- Aulis Ruostepuro 1985
- Mikko Majanlahti 1986–1990
- Alpo Suhonen 1991–1992
- Ilpo Tuomarila 1993–2007
- Raija-Liisa Seilo 2008–2013
- Arto Valkama 2014– (director) and Mikko Kouki 2014– (art director)
