= Cholera Basin =

Harbour basin in Helsinki, Finland

Coordinates: 60°10′02″N 024°57′10.5″E

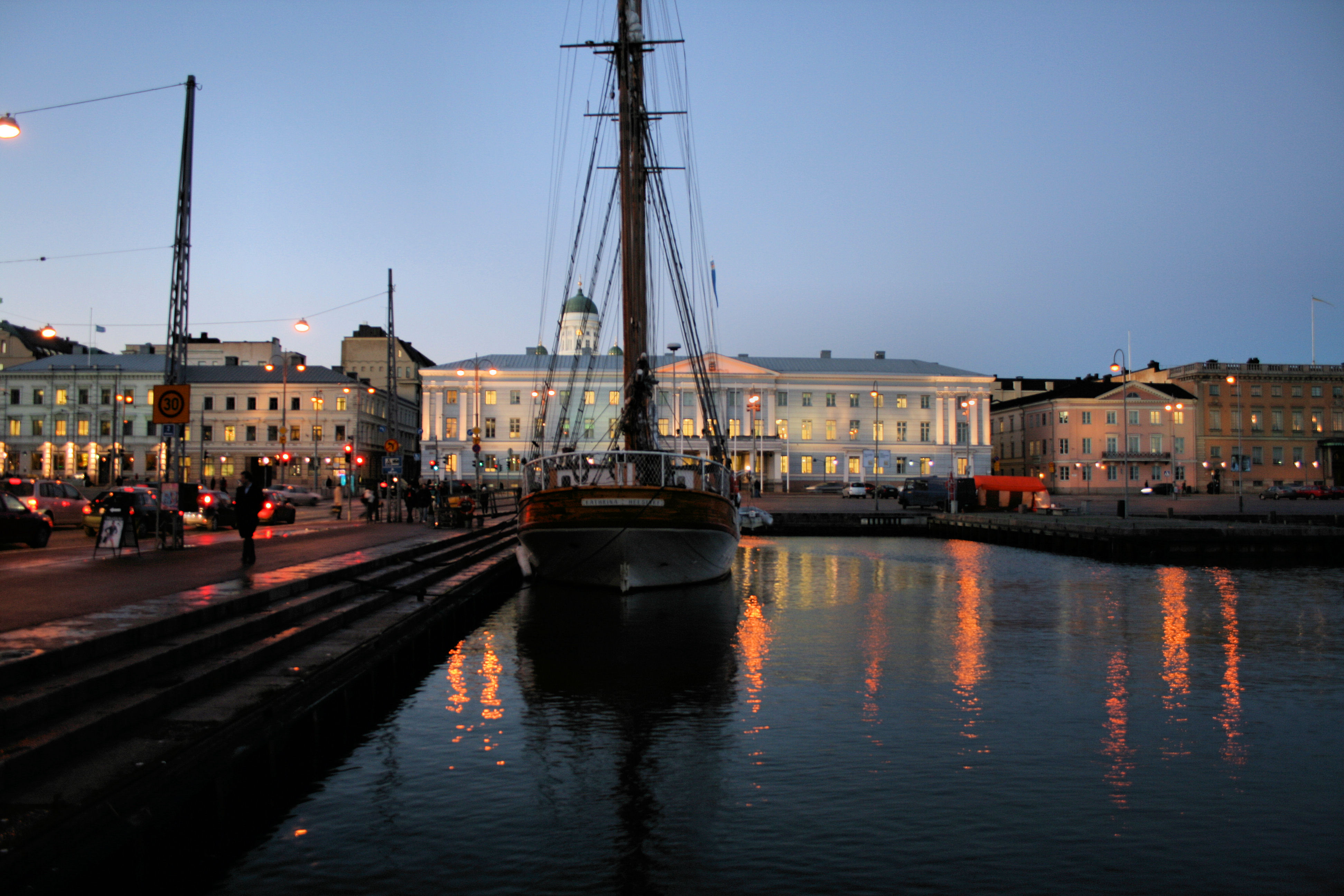
The Cholera basin on the shore of the Market Square. In the background is the Helsinki city hall.

The Cholera basin (Finnish: Kolera-allas, Swedish: Kolerabassängen) is the established name for the western harbour basin in front of the Market Square in Helsinki, Finland.

== History ==
The harbour basins were built in the early 19th century. At that time, the Market Square area consisted of the muddy Kaupunginlahti bay. Its shores had many shore huts and small piers. Where the edge of the Market Square is now was the Eteläinen Rantakatu street.

As the city developed, the harbour needed a continuous pier. The shore was low, and this allowed the shoreline to be moved outwards by filling the shore. The work took years. For small steam ships, rowing and sailing ships, three basins were built. At the northwestern corner was built the so-called Fish basin (Kala-allas). In the city documents, the name of the basin was Stadfiskarens båthamn, meaning city fishers' boat harbour, Fiskarhamnen meaning fishers' harbour.

In 1893, Johannes Michelsson, a sailor from Nagu who had come to the herring market died of cholera on his ship. Later it was found out that the excrement and vomit of the sick man had been dumped into the harbour basin. As a safety precaution, the herring ships were towed away from the harbour, and guards were briefly posted at the shore, because it was feared that the citizens might start to use the contaminated water. After the incident, the colloquial name of the basin was established as Kolerabassängen - the Cholera basin.

In the 19th century, the water in the Fisher's harbour and in the entire Eteläsatama harbour was still contaminated by sewers. Rats infested the harbour. On the northern shore of Katajanokka, there was a sewage pier, also bringing dirt and stench. The products of outdoor toilets were loaded onto barges there, where they were taken to the countryside to be used as manure.

There were rumours in the city that in the night, the barges silently dump their cargo straight into the water. This was even claimed to be a stinking revolt against Governor General Nikolai Bobrikov's politics.

== Trivia ==
Saint Jacob is connected with a tradition of carrying a stone on the pilgrimage to Santiago de Compostela and then throwing it away to symbolize absolution - this associates Jacob with stone-casting. Finnish tradition holds that on the name day of Jaakko (Jacob), July 25, "Jaakko throws a cold stone into the water". The swimming season peaks and waters begin to gradually cool. In order to celebrate this manifestly unscientific knowledge, the Finnish Unscientific Society (Epätieteellinen seura), a whimsical society with members mainly from the University of Helsinki, organizes an event where a chosen Jaakko throws a cold stone into the Cholera basin. Since 1995, various objects have been thrown into the basin, including an iron, a deep frozen rock, a cosmic meteorite, a wooden cobble stone, a lava rock from Etna, half of a runestone, a rock from the Volga river, "an egg of a mummy" (cooled by 180 degrees by transport 180 degrees west in longitude) and a blade sharpening stone. In 2017, the stone was taken from the basement of the Parliament House.
