= Veikko Haukkavaara =

Finnish artist (1921–2004)

Veikko Haukkavaara (October 3, 1921, Tampere – August 4, 2004) was a Finnish artist. He is best known for his sculptures welded out of pieces of metal.

Veikko Haukkavaara lived most of his life in Tampere.
