= Olympia Terminal =

Ferry terminal in Helsinki, Finland

Coordinates: 60°09′40″N 024°57′29″E

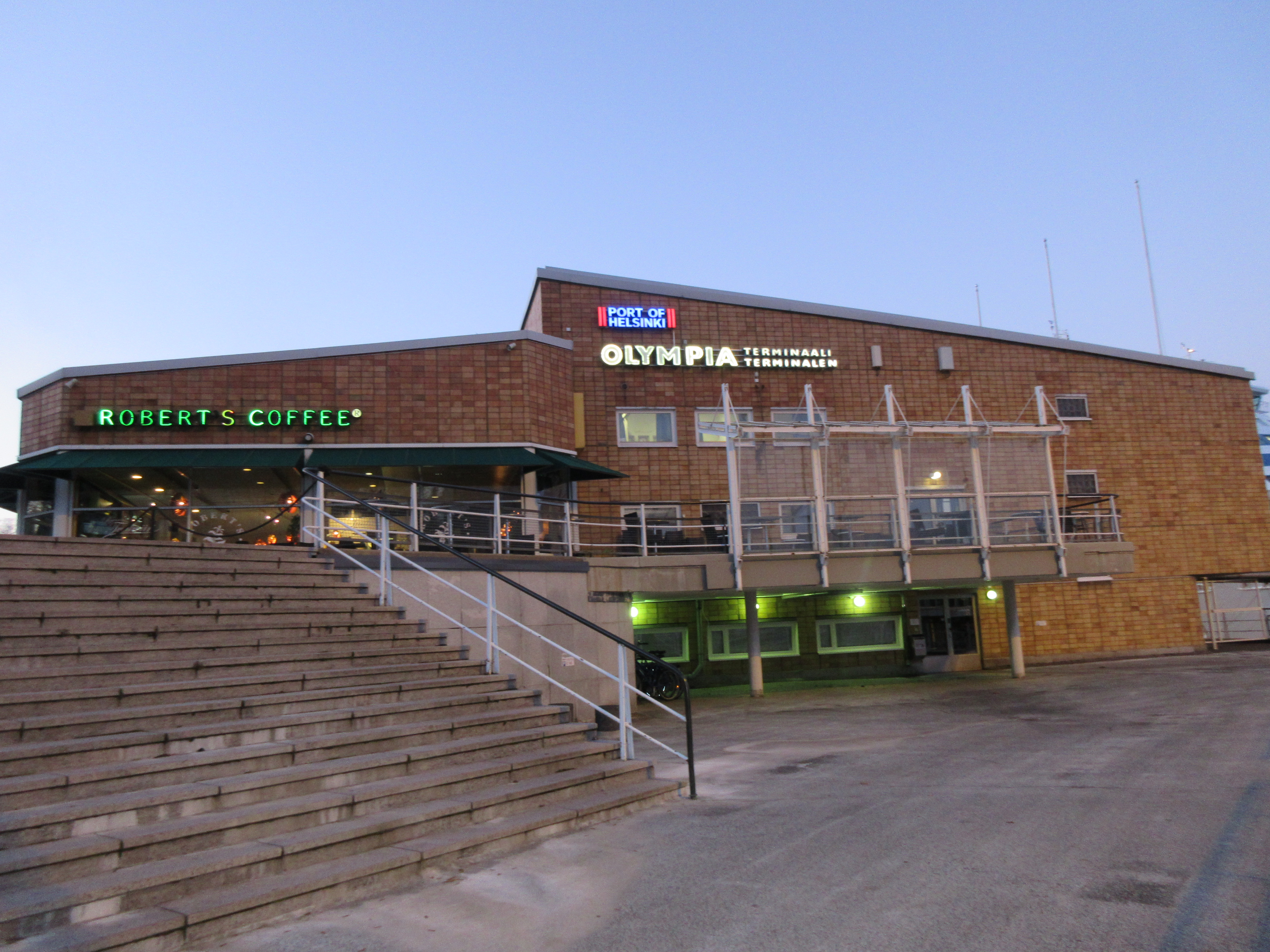
The Olympia Terminal

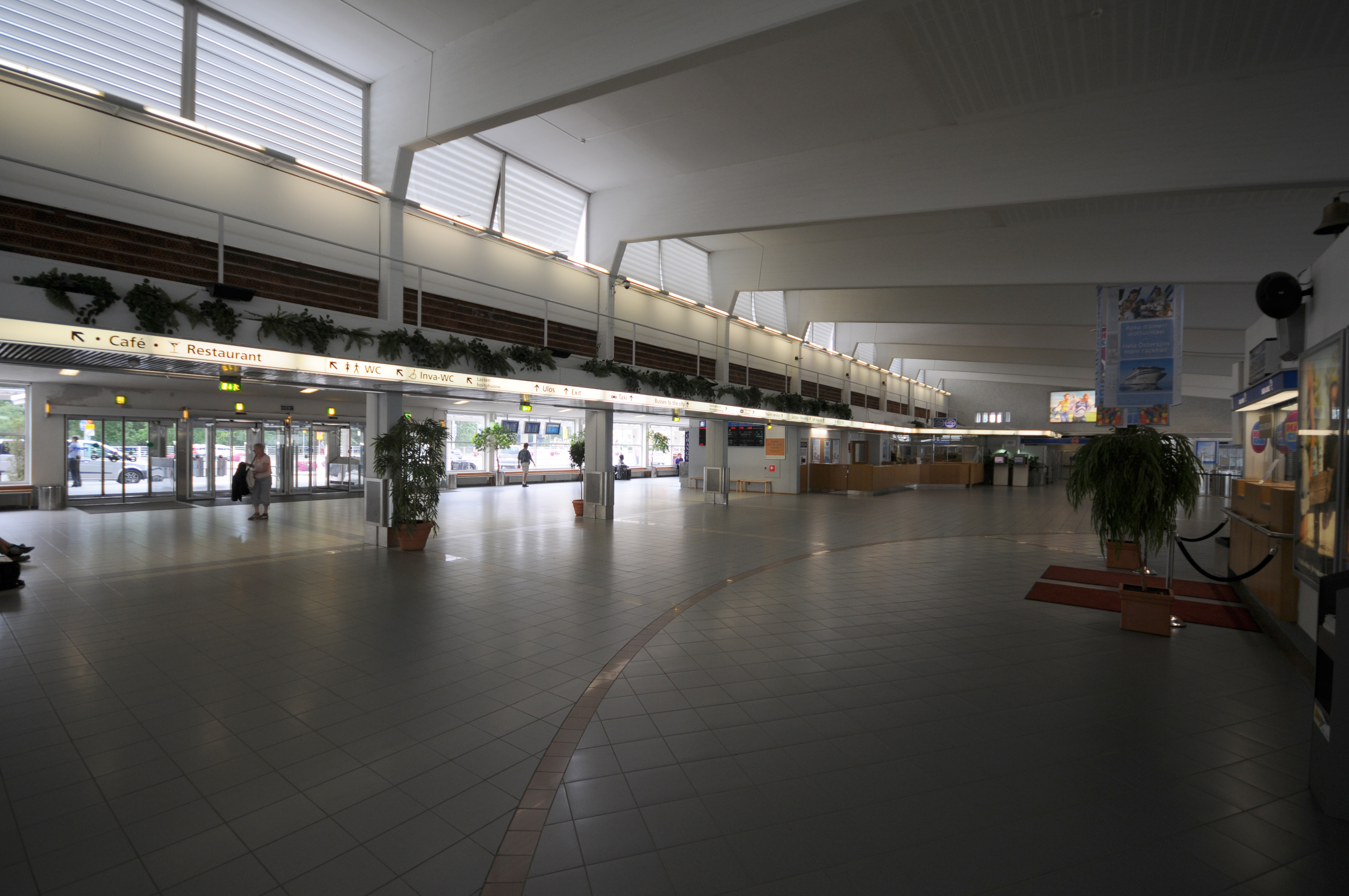
Waiting hall by the check-in desks

The Olympia Terminal (Finnish: Olympiaterminaali, Swedish: Olympiaterminalen) is a dock in the South Harbour of Helsinki, Finland. It was designed by the Hytönen-Luukkonen architects bureau and opened for the 1952 Summer Olympics.

Today, the terminal has a regular connection to Stockholm, acting as Silja Line's Helsinki terminal. Over 1.5 million passengers travel through the Olympia Terminal annually. A currency exchange point, an ATM and a café are present in the building.

Silja Line's MS Silja Serenade and MS Silja Symphony operate daily to Stockholm's Värtahamnen, departing at 17:00.

== History ==
The Helsingin Meriasema (English: Helsinki Marine Station), was opened on 16 July 1952, just before the Olympics. The building was designed by architects Aarre Hytönen and Risto-Veikko Luukkonen. The first ship to use the new passenger pavilion was SS Bore I, arriving from Stockholm on the opening day. SS Bore I was also the first ship to depart from the harbour, as it set off on its return journey at 19:00. The next day, MS Brynhild arrived and the day after that, MS Aallotar arrived. The Olympic pier was first used by cruise ships to Stockholm.

When the Olympia Terminal was completed in 1952, it was visited by over 90,000 passengers annually, but only in summer and autumn. Silja Line started all-year-round traffic from the Olympia Terminal to Stockholm in 1972 and regular traffic to Tallinn in 1995. However, regular traffic to Tallinn from the Olympia Terminal ceased in 2005. The terminal and its ferry docks were renovated in 1989/1990 to handle larger ships. The facility includes two cruiseferry docks and sets of driving ramps.

== Ships serving the terminal ==
Company	Ship	Route
(Finland) Silja Line	MS Silja Serenade	Helsinki – Mariehamn – Stockholm
(Finland) Silja Line	MS Silja Symphony	Helsinki – Mariehamn – Stockholm
