= Ebba-Stina Schalin-Hult =

Finnish and Swedish architect (1913–1999)

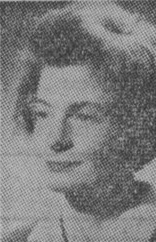
- Born: Ebba-Stina Arnoldsdotter Schalin; 22 December 1913; Czernowitz, Austria-Hungary
- Died: 3 October 1999 (aged 85); Stockholm, Sweden
- Citizenship: Finland; Sweden
- Education: KTH Royal Institute of Technology
- Occupation: Architect

Ebba-Stina Arnoldsdotter Schalin-Hult (22 December 1913 – 3 October 1999) was a Finnish and Swedish architect.

== Biography ==
Born in Czernowitz in Austria-Hungary, Schalin-Hult's parents were Finnish dean Arnold Schalin and Verna Andersin. She matriculated from high school in 1931, graduated as an architect from the Helsinki University of Technology in 1940 in Finland and studied at Stockholm's KTH Royal Institute of Technology (1943–44) in Sweden. From 1938 she worked at the Helsinki Building Board, from 1940 at the Tampere City Planning Office in Finland, from 1943 at the Stockholm County Architect's Office, from 1949 as an inspector at the Swedish Building Agency in Stockholm, and from 1952 as an architect in Stockholm's regional planning.

From 1942 she was married to army commander Björn Hult.
