= Aarne Hytönen =

Finnish architect

Aarne Jonatan Hytönen (10 October 1901, Turku - 29 April 1972) was a Finnish architect. He is best known for designing the Töölö Sports Hall and the Olympia Terminal in Helsinki, Finland together with Risto-Veikko Luukkonen. Both buildings are listed by Docomomo as significant examples of modern architecture in Finland.

== Works ==
- Töölö Sports Hall, Helsinki, Finland (1935) – together with Risto-Veikko Luukkonen
- Finnish pavilion at the Brussels International Exposition (1935) – together with Risto-Veikko Luukkonen
- Suomi-yhtiö office building, Helsinki (1938) – together with Risto-Veikko Luukkonen
- Olympia Terminal, Helsinki (1953) – together with Risto-Veikko Luukkonen
- Ii Church (1950) – together with Gustav Strandberg
- Valkeakoski Town Hall (1955) – together with Risto-Veikko Luukkonen
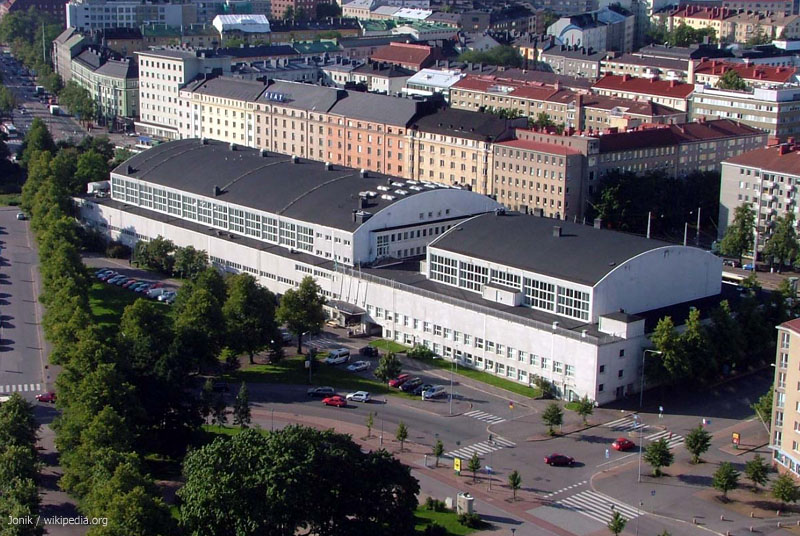
Töölö Sports Hall

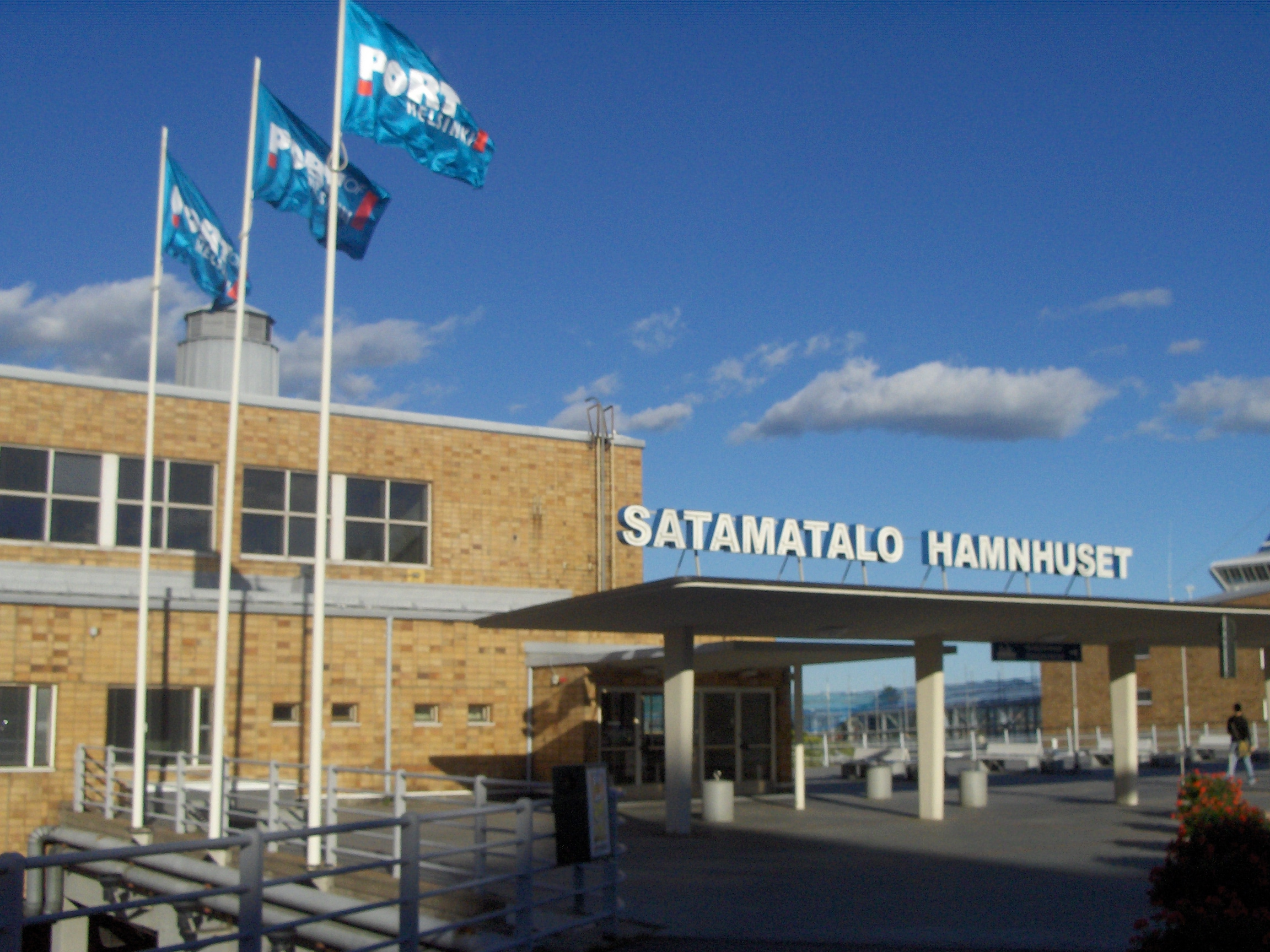
Olympia Terminal

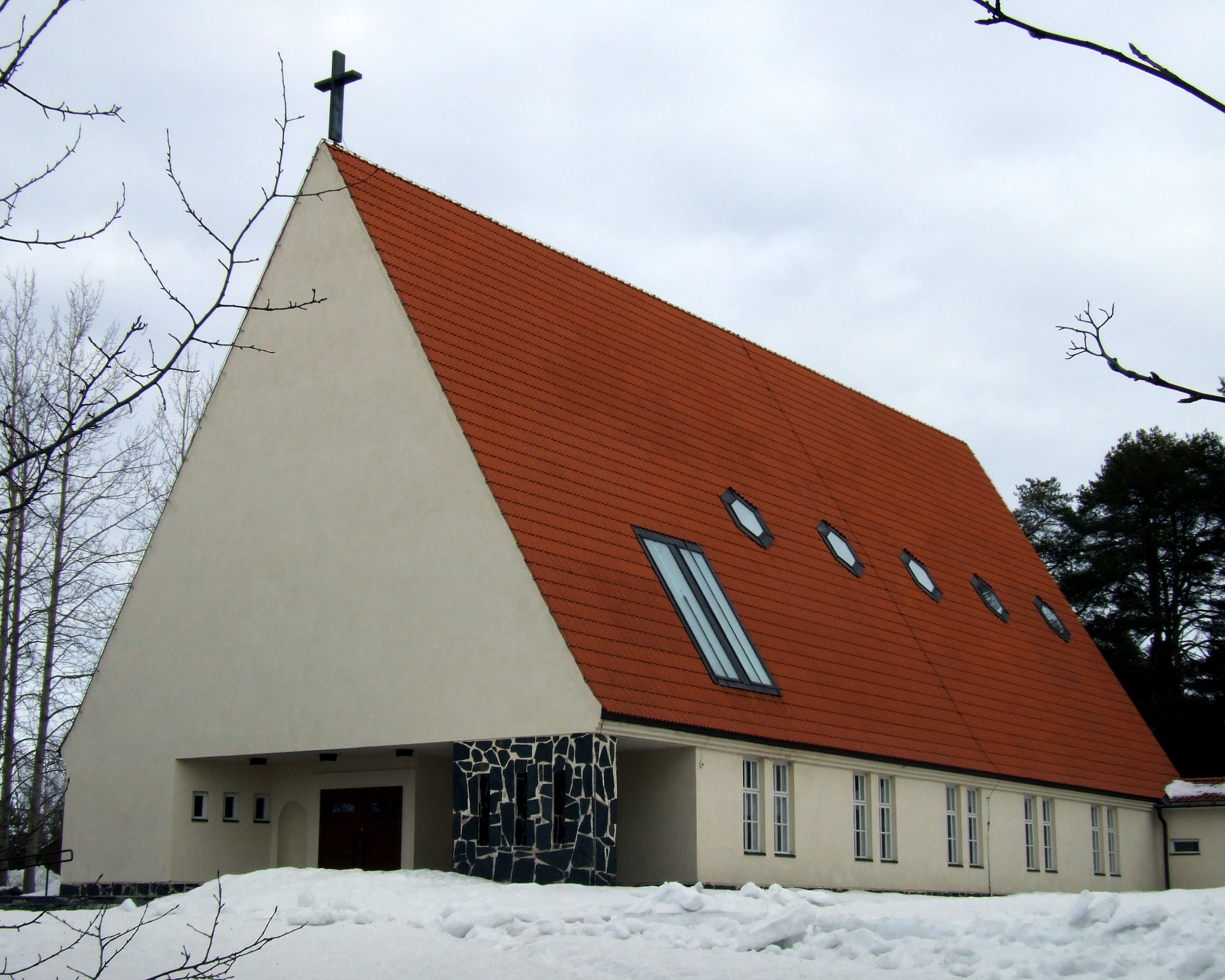
Ii Church
