= South Harbour, Helsinki =

Bay and harbour in Helsinki, Finland

Coordinates: 60°09′53″N 024°57′30″E

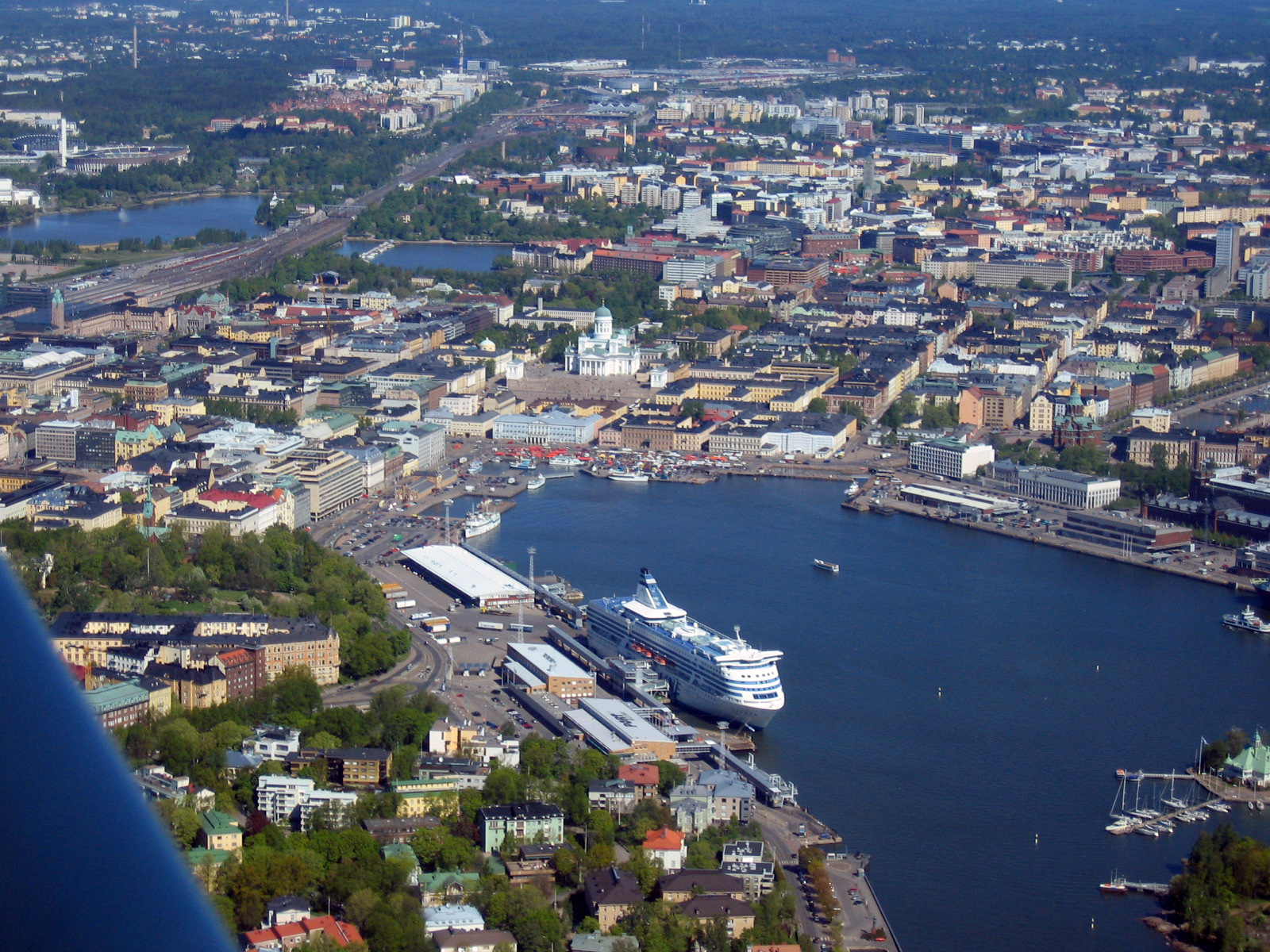
Aerial view of Eteläsatama, Helsinki

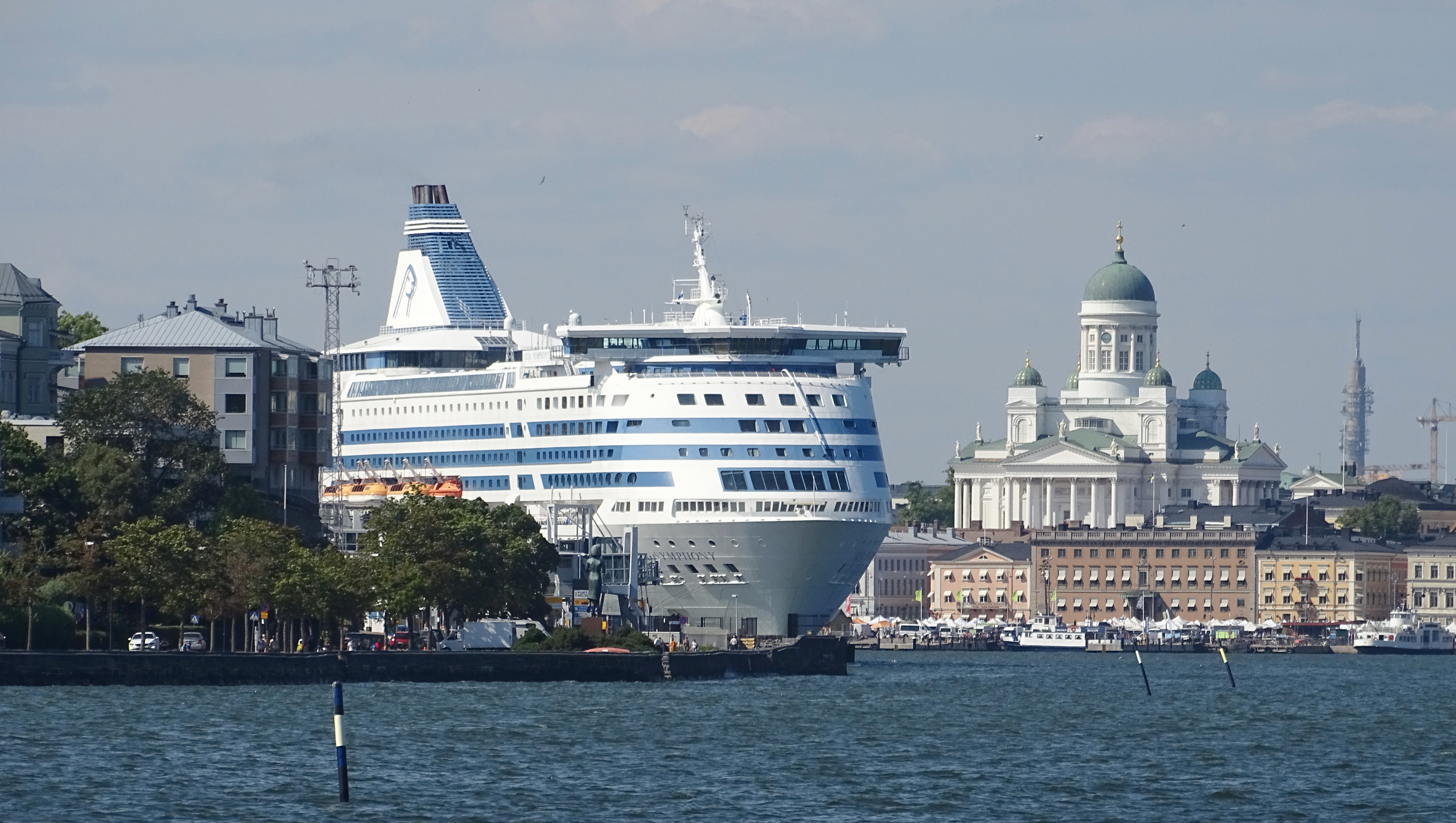
Eteläsatama seen from the south with Helsinki Cathedral visible in the background

South Harbour (Finnish: Eteläsatama, Swedish: Södra hamnen) is a bay and harbour area immediately next to the centre of the city of Helsinki, Finland. 4.7 million passengers in liner traffic and about 37,000 international cruise passengers travel through it every year. Also over million tonnes of unitized cargo passes through the South Harbour. Most of the harbour's traffic is to Stockholm, Sweden and Tallinn, Estonia, and cruises. In summertime, there is also much small ship traffic. During the winter time, excess snow from snow removal may be disposed of in the harbor. As of 2020, the Carmel, an old vessel, was keeping the harbor open by circling 400 times within 24 hours.

== Geography ==
The bay is bordered by the districts of Katajanokka, Kaartinkaupunki, Ullanlinna and Kaivopuisto. The waterway leading to the South Harbour is 9.6 metres deep. The most critical point on the waterway is the Kustaanmiekka strait, with a width of 80 metres. The waterway has a speed limit of 30 km/h, except for the Katajanokka area, which has a speed limit of 10 km/h.

== Piers and terminals ==
The South Harbour has eight named piers and three terminals.

The Katajanokka Quay (Finnish: Katajanokanlaituri, Swedish: Skatuddskajen) runs nearly the whole length of Katajanokka, with a length of 740 metres and water depth of 8.8 metres. The furthest part of the pier, towards the sea, consists of the cruising ship pier, with a water depth of 10.3 metres. At the middle of the pier is the Katajanokka Terminal, used by the Viking Line cruiseferries among others.

At the end near the Helsinki Market Square was the Kanava Terminal (Finnish: Kanavaterminaali, Swedish: Kanalterminalen), used by express ships travelling to Tallinn. The terminal was pulled down in 2012.

In front of the Presidential Palace is the Linnanallas (Slottsbassängen) bay, used by visiting small boats. Between the bay and the sea lies Linnanlaituri (Slottskajen), used for traffic to Korkeasaari and Porvoo.

At the Market Square shore is Keisarinluodonlaituri (Kejsargrundskajen), named after an islet that the ship carrying emperor Nicholas I of Russia collided with in 1833. Nowadays the islet lies under filling ground brought to the shore. The pier is used mostly by the commuter ship to Suomenlinna.

On the other side of the disused turning railway bridge is the Cholera Basin, named after a seaman who died from cholera. The bay is used by fishermen and tourist ships.

Next to the Old Market Hall is the Vironallas (Estbassängen) bay, used by visiting boats. The part between Vironallas and the former railway bridge is called Lyypekinlaituri. It was formerly used by ships to Lübeck, Germany. The pier between Vironallas and the sea is called Pakkahuoneenlaituri (Packhuskajen). It is 135 metres long and has a water depth of 6.0 metres.

Next is the Makasiini Terminal (Finnish: Makasiiniterminaali, Swedish: Magasinterminalen), used by express ships to Tallinn. The Makasiini Quay pier next to it is 270 metres long and has a water depth of 7.2 to 7.5 metres. At its end is the Matkustajalaituri (Passagerkajen) pier, used by loading cruiseliners to Stockholm.

The southernmost terminal is the Olympia Terminal, built for the 1952 Summer Olympics. It is used by the cruiseferries of Silja Line. The Olympia Quay pier next to it is 370 metres long and has a water depth of 7.5 to 8.8 metres.

On the Valkosaari island in front of the Olympia Terminal is the home port of Nyländska Jaktklubben (NJK), Helsinki's oldest yacht club, and a restaurant. In summertime, there is a regular ship connection to the island from the south side of the terminal.

== History ==
In the 17th century, the bay was called Kaupunginlahti (Stadsviken). Its shores were so low that it was only suited for a harbour for boats owned by the inhabitants of the coast and the islands. In the 18th century, the main loading point on the bay's shore was the Erhardt pier. In the middle 18th century, the bay was called Eteläinen kaupunginsatama (Södra Stadshamnen). For long, it was a secondary harbour. As traffic increased, fastening places for ships were built on the shores and harbour warehouses for storing cargo were built.

When Helsinki was made the capital of Finland, the bay's shores were filled and they were first outfitted with wooden piers, later by stone piers. The city wanted to turn its secondary harbour into a first-class one. In the early 19th century, the Market Square was founded on filled ground. A minor incident happened in 1827, when the bottom of the filled ground failed, and masses of land flowed down to the sea. The Makasiinilaituri pier also sank to the sea. Further harm to harbour visitor was caused by the shipwrecks, which could lie on the bottom of the sea for years.

For long, the Ullanlinna shipyard was located at the southern part of the bay, which was renamed to Ulricaborgs skeppsvarf (Finnish: Ullanlinnan Varviyhtiö) in 1847. In Katajanokka, shores were filled and built with piers and handsome cargo warehouses. The connections to the harbour improved considerably, when a railway was built there from 1891 to 1894. In 1900, a new customs house was built in Katajanokka. In the same year, the harbour was being excavated and the Eteläranta side was completed. Thus Eteläsatama got its current form.

In 1922, Helsinki got the icebreaker Hercules, so that ships could also travel in winter. For transport of heavy cargo, the harbour got a 25-tonne crane in 1894. More cranes were acquired starting from the 1920s so that in 1939, Eteläsatama already had 14 cranes.

In 1936, the city council decided to expand Eteläsatama to the Helsinki shipyard. This included extensive track work to the railways, which were completed in 1952. In the same year, a pier in Katajanokka collapsed into the sea, and part of the long pier had to be closed. The car ferry era between Finland and Sweden began in the early 1960s. Cargo traffic in Katajanokka was discontinued and the railway there was dismantled in the early 1980s. Since that time, Eteläsatama has been used by passenger ships and car ferries.

=== Gallery ===
Images of Eteläsatama

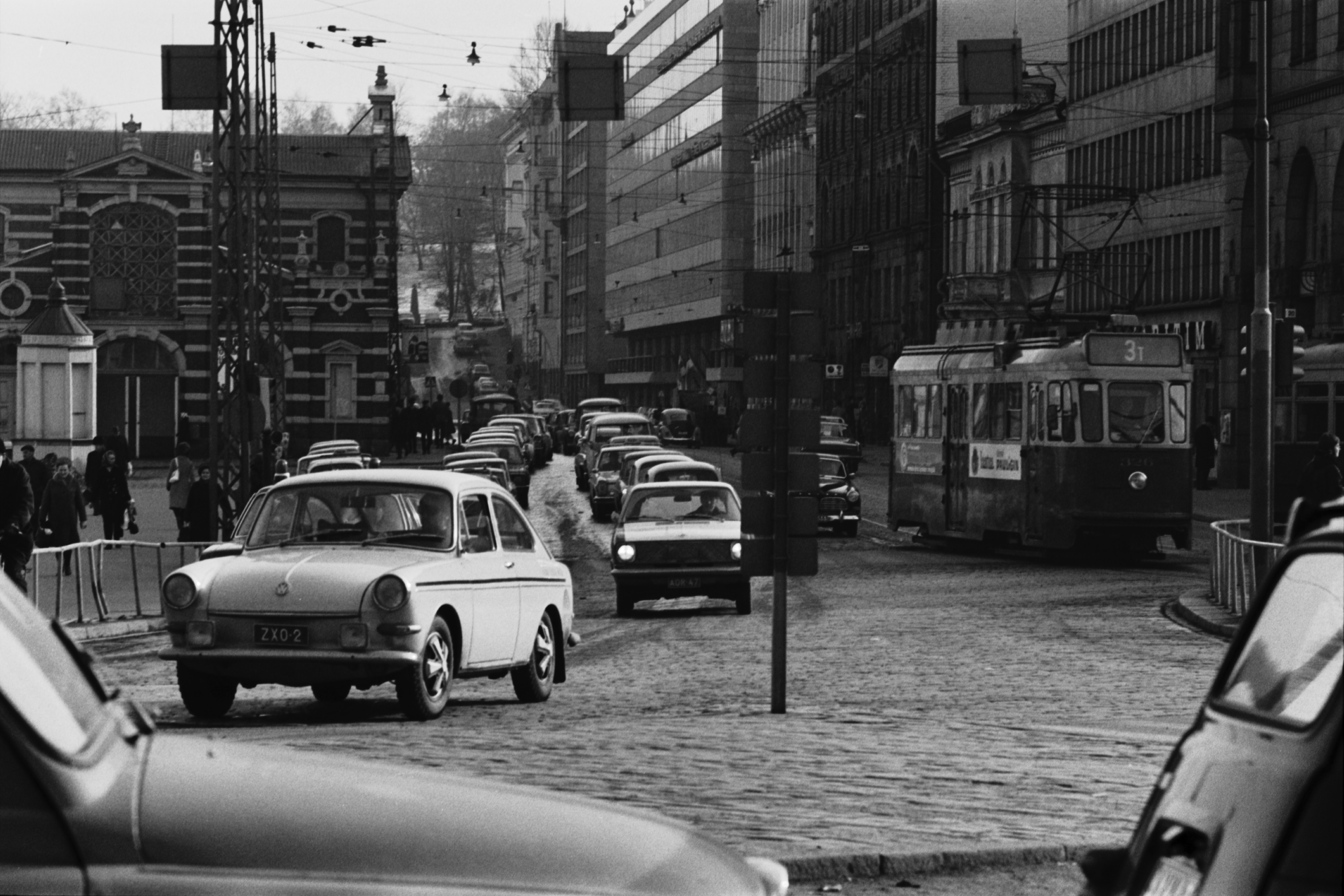
Kaartinkaupunki in 1971

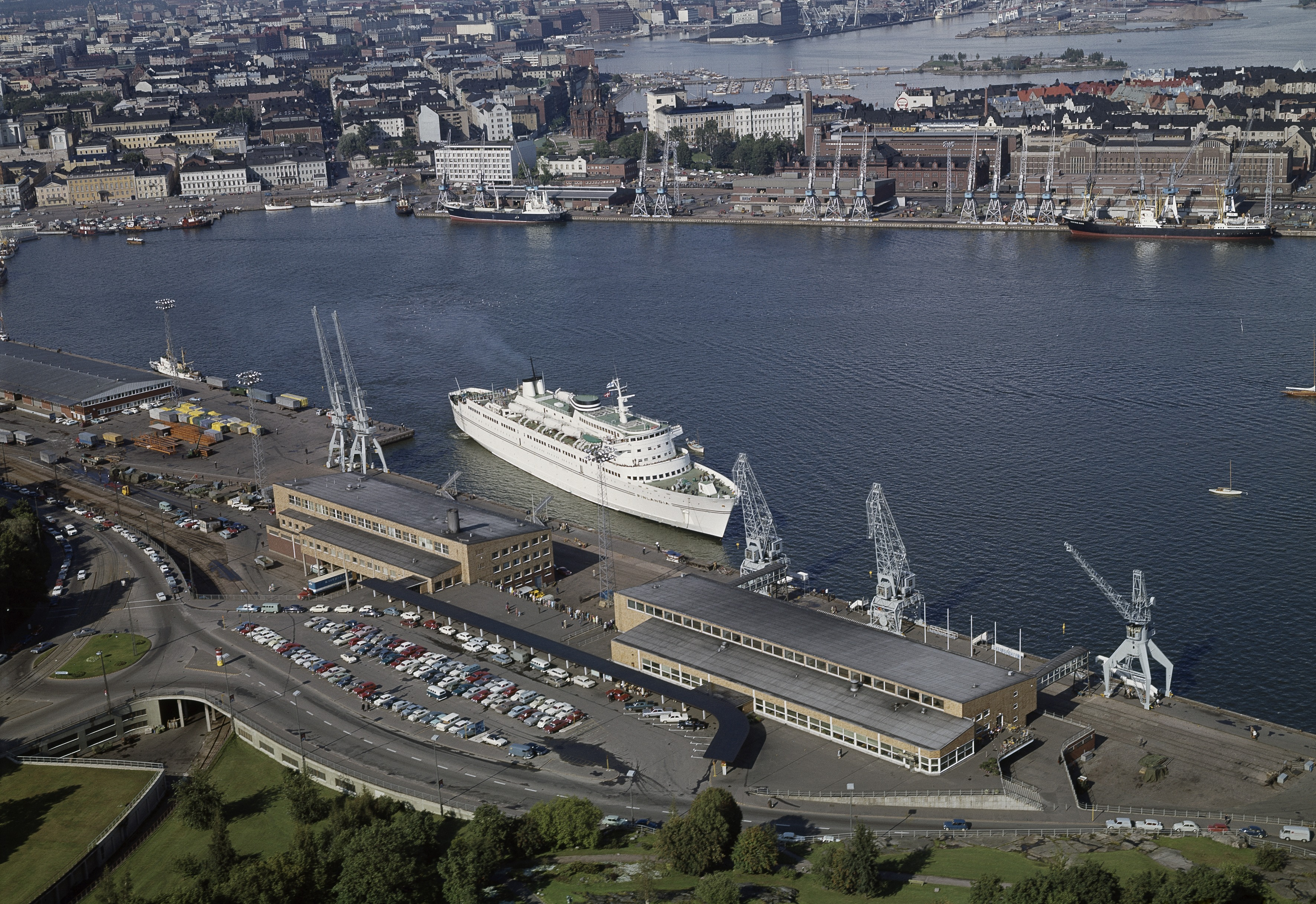
Aerial view of the Olympia Terminal in 1972

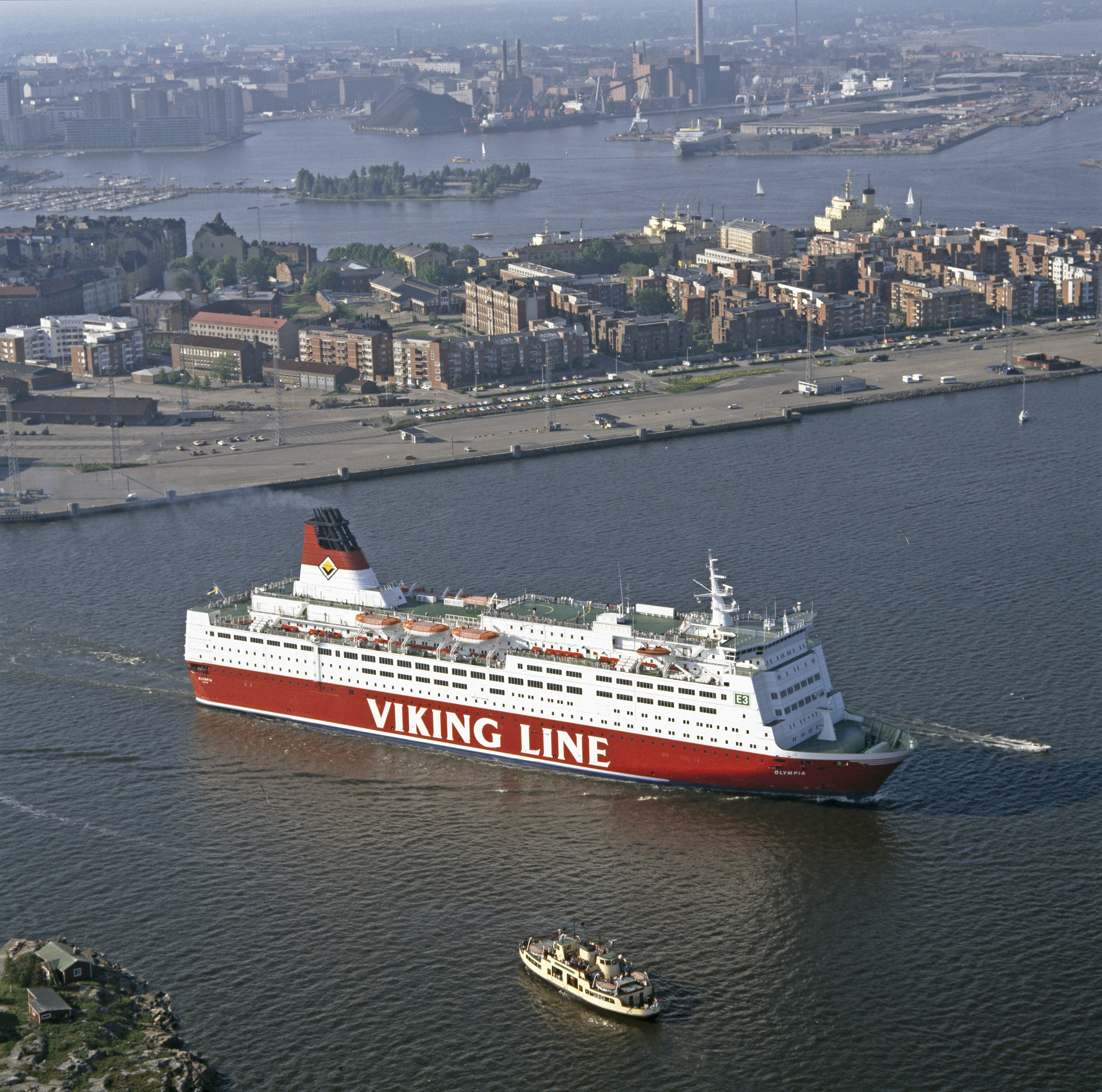
Cruiseferry MS Olympia leaving Katajanokka, Helsinki for Stadsgården, Stockholm in 1986

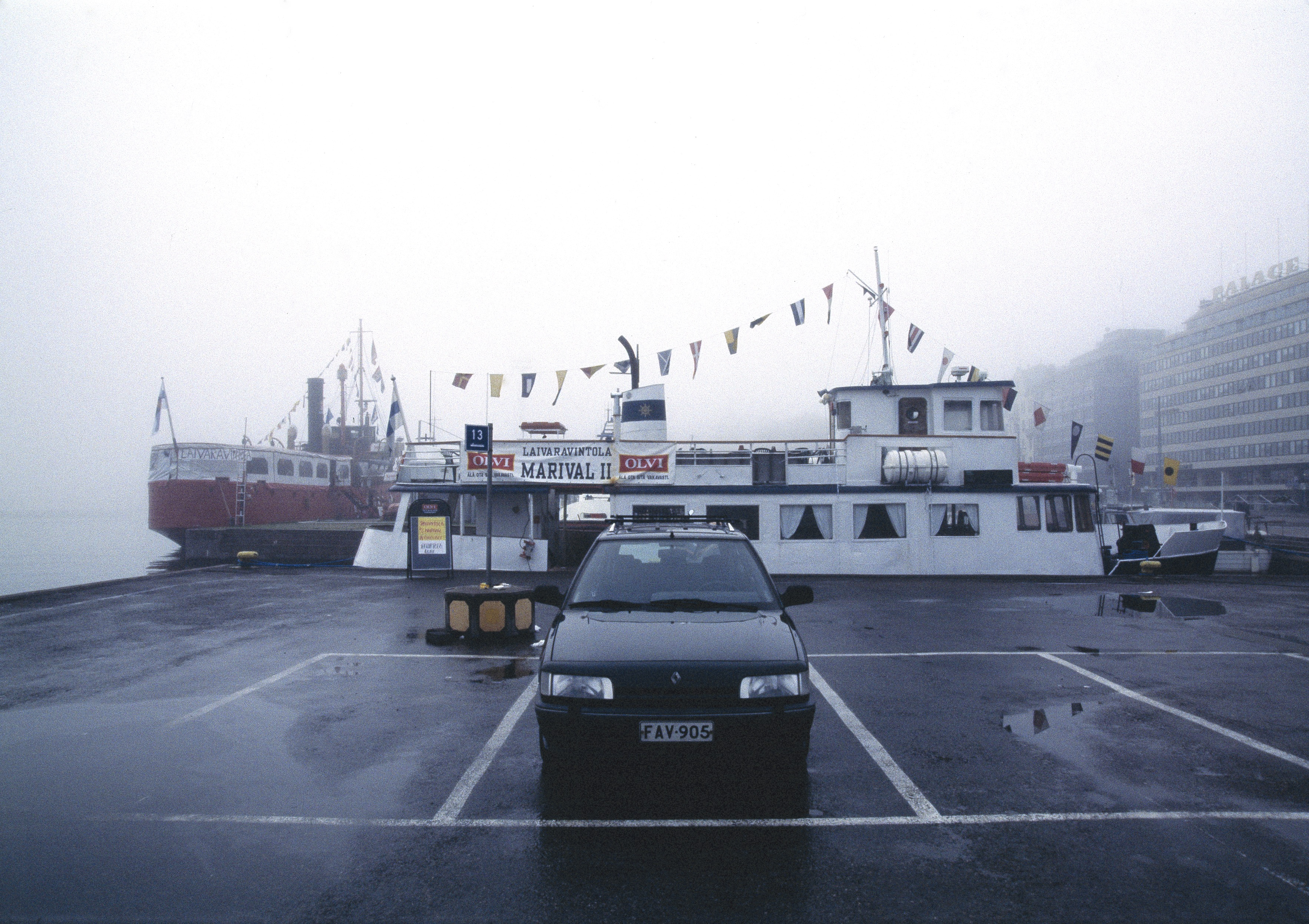
Vironallas in 2001

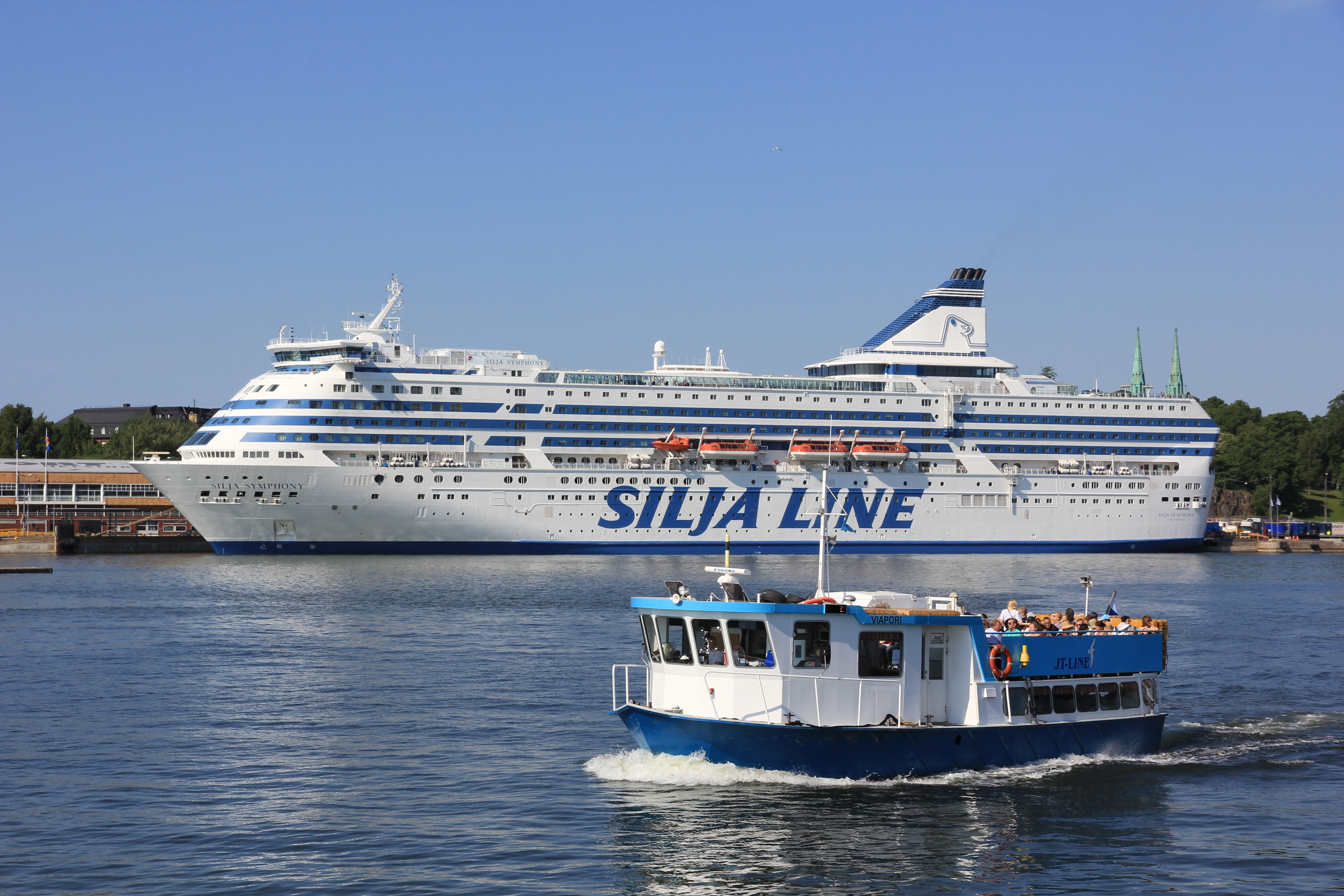
MS Silja Symphony docked at the Olympia Terminal in the summer of 2011

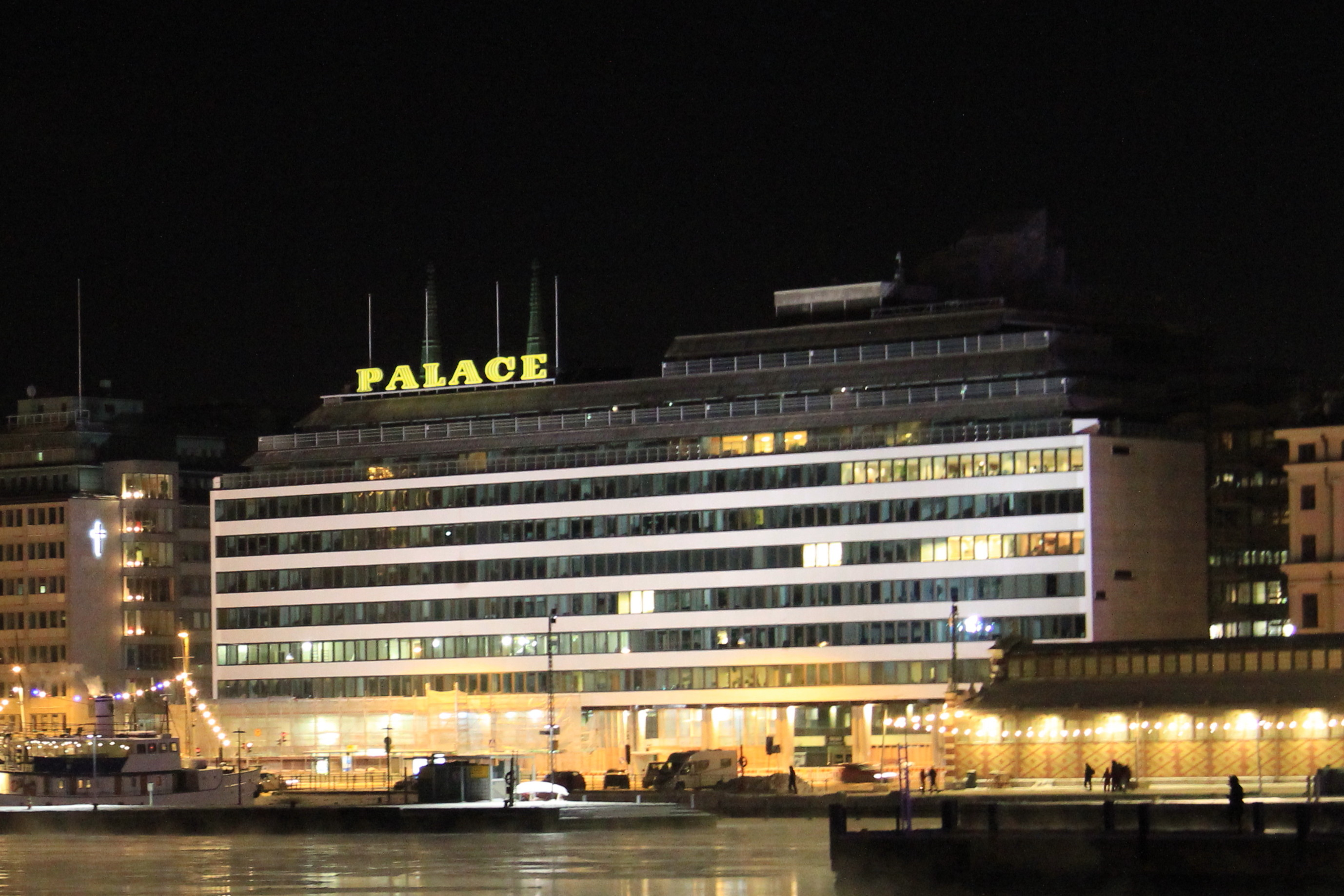
Palace Hotel at night in January, 2017

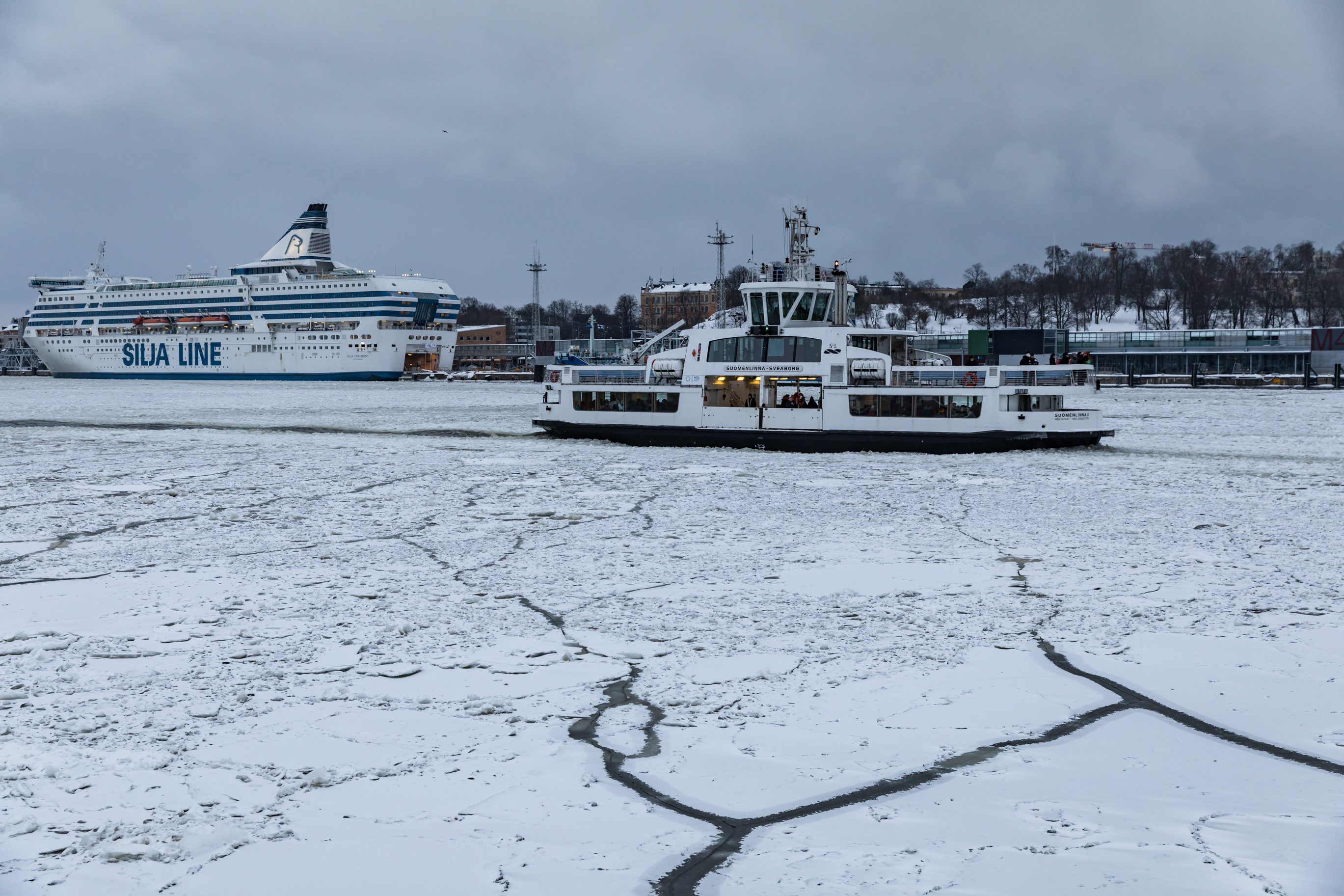
Ice-covered waters of Eteläsatama in winter, 2018

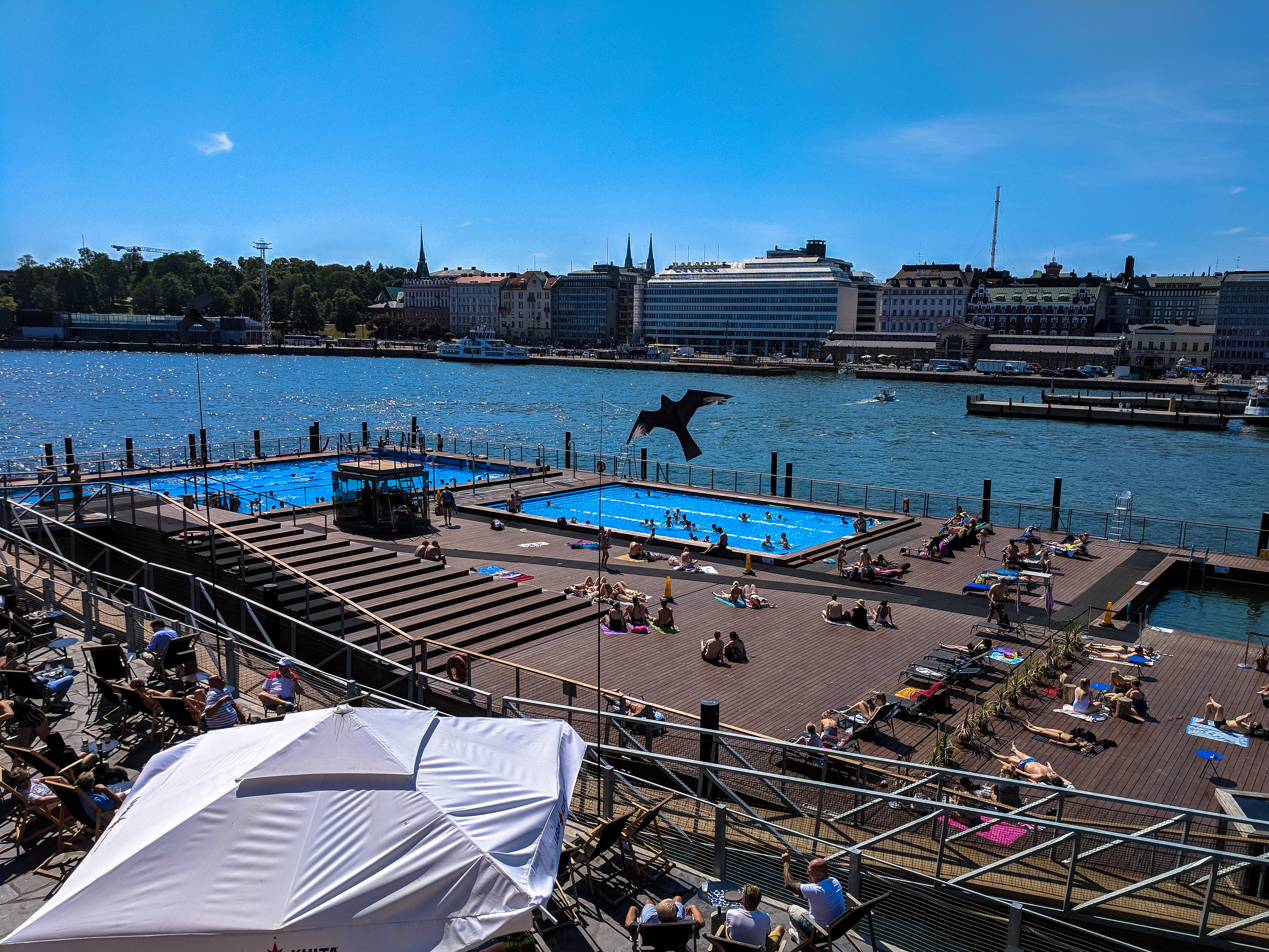
Allas Sea Pool in the summer of 2018
