= Risto-Veikko Luukkonen =

Finnish architect

Risto-Veikko Luukkonen (25 June 1902, Mikkeli – 7 September 1972, Helsinki) was a Finnish architect. He is best known for designing the Töölö Sports Hall and the Olympia Terminal in Helsinki together with Aarne Hytönen, both of which are listed by Docomomo (a global organization preserving modernist architecture) as significant examples of modern architecture in Finland.

== Works ==
- Töölö Sports Hall, Helsinki (1935) – together with Aarne Hytönen
- Finnish pavilion at the Brussels International Exposition (1935) – together with Aarne Hytönen
- Suomi-yhtiö office building, Helsinki (1938) – together with Aarne Hytönen
- Turku Concert Hall (1952)
- Olympia Terminal, Helsinki (1953) – together with Aarne Hytönen
- Valkeakoski Town Hall (1955) – together with Aarne Hytönen
- Turku City Theatre (1962) – together with Helmer Stenroos
- Kuopio City Theatre (1963) – together with Helmer Stenroos
- State Office Building, Turku (1967) – together with Helmer Stenroos
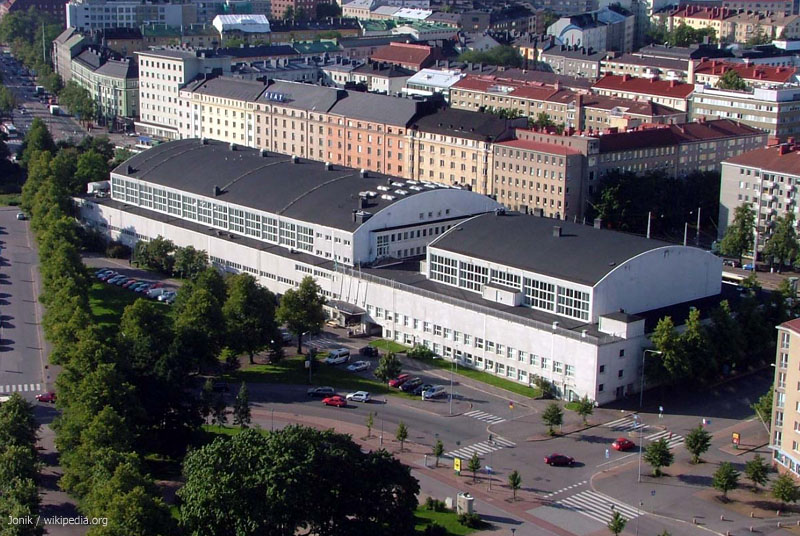
Töölö Sports Hall

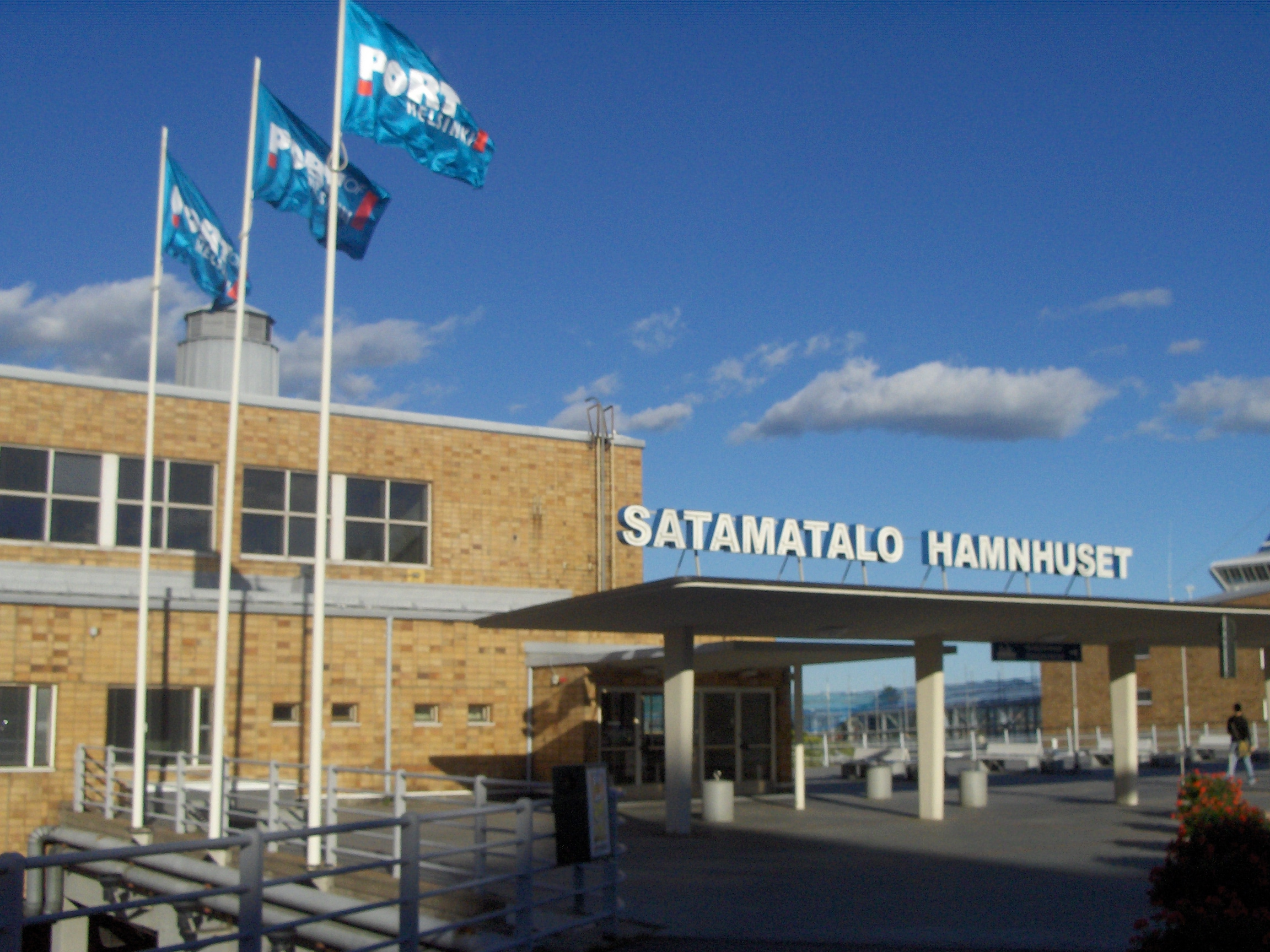
Olympia Terminal

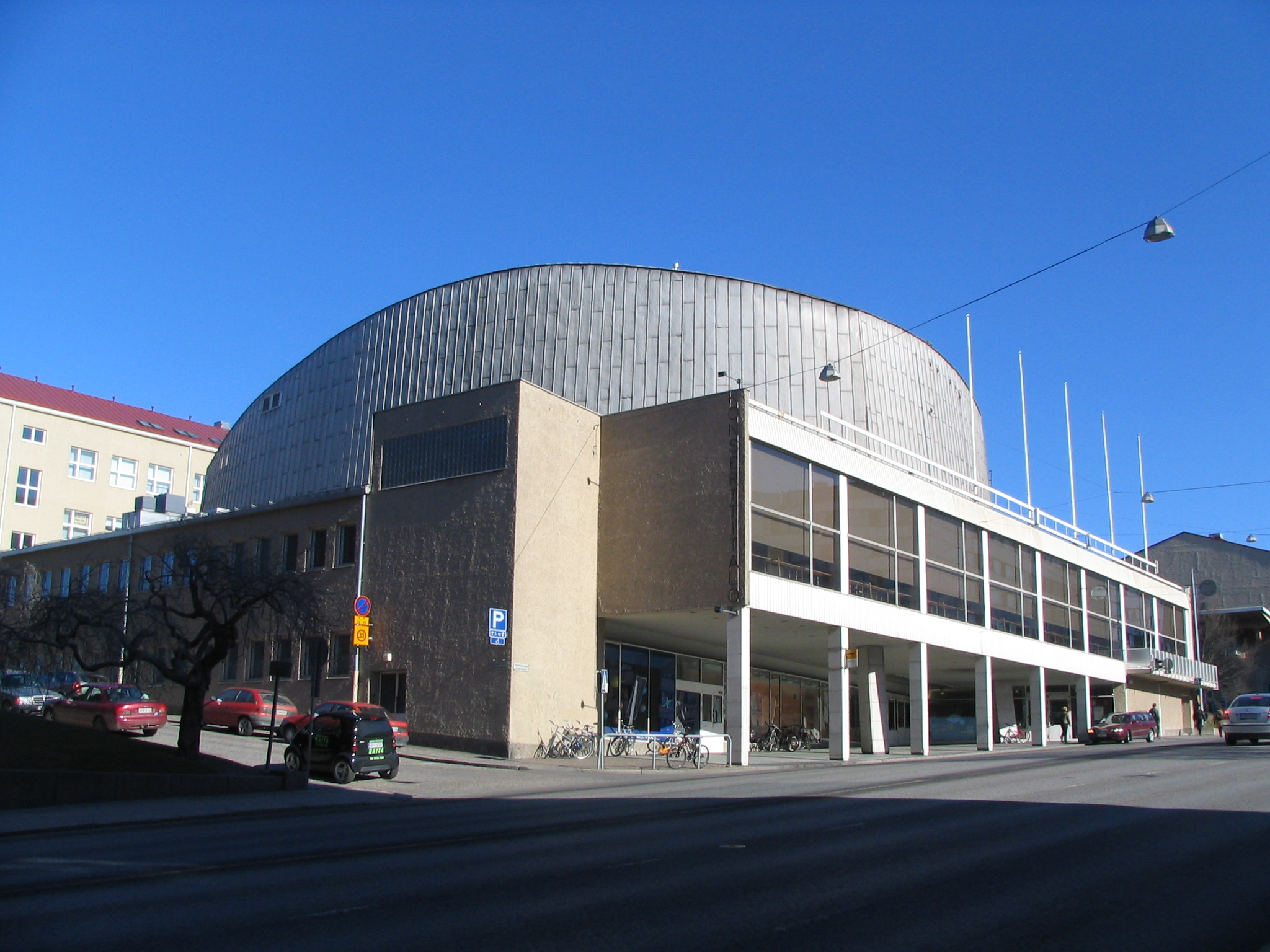
Turku Concert Hall

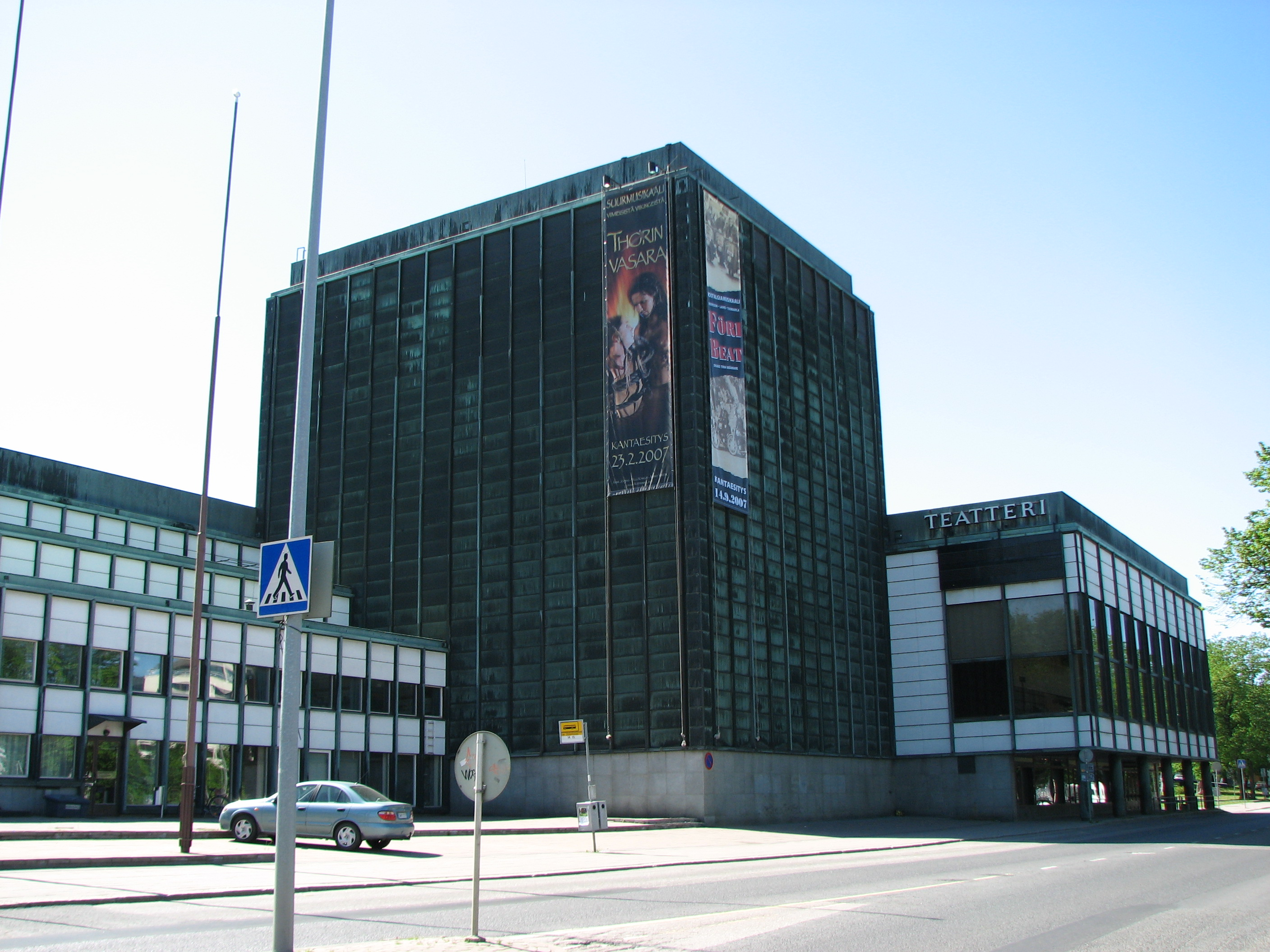
Turku City Theatre

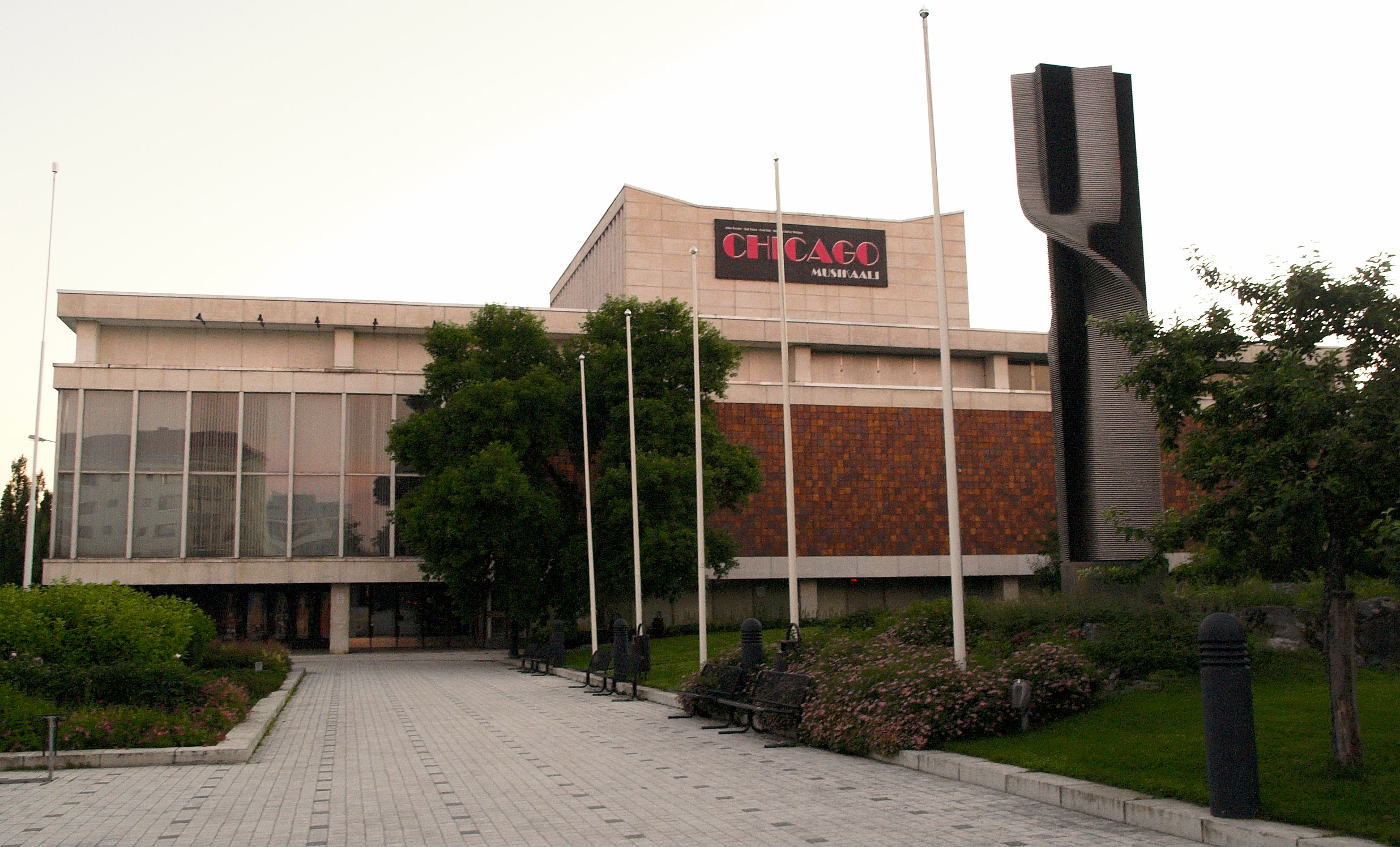
Kuopio City Theater

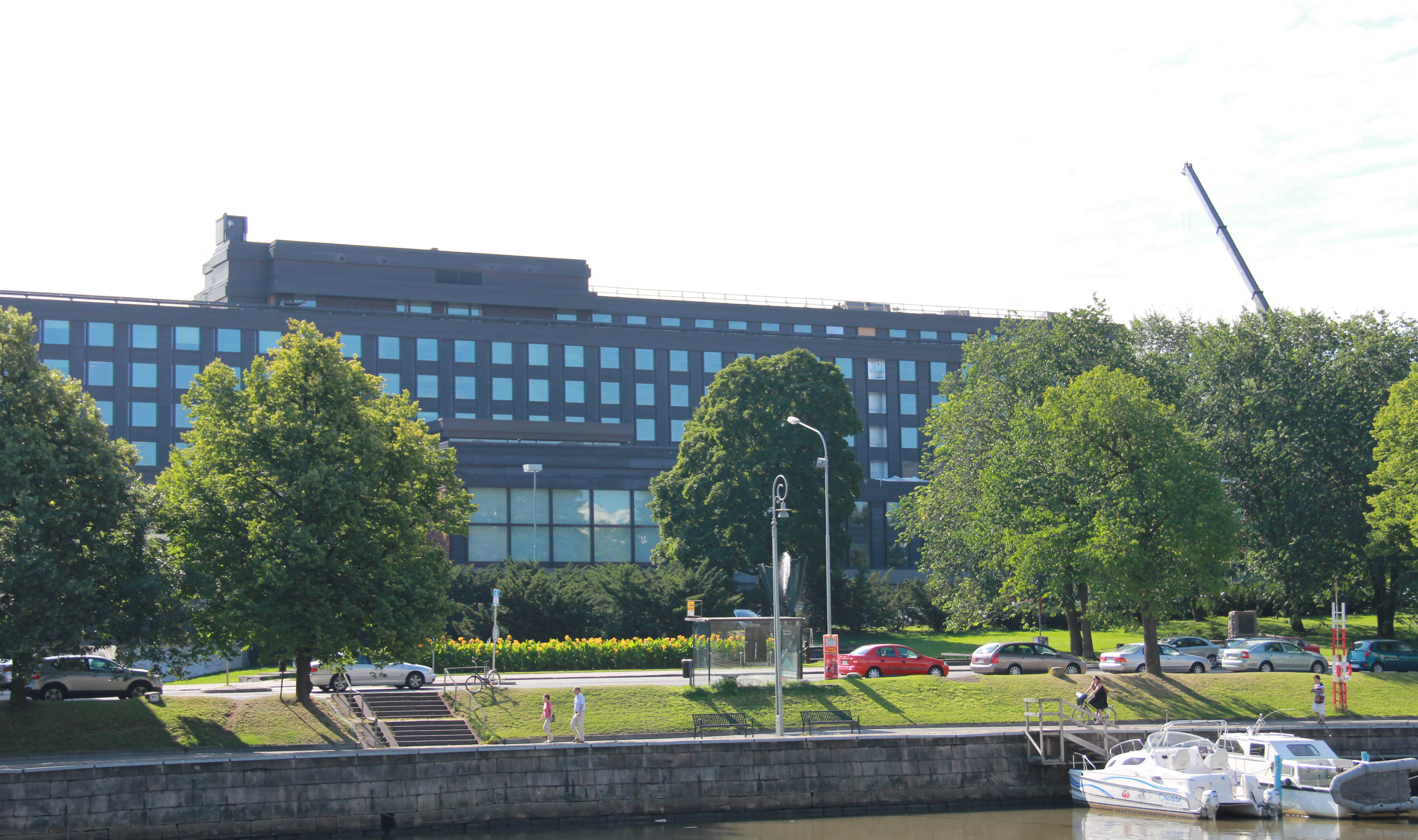
State Office Building, Turku
