= Veikko Karppinen =

Finnish ice hockey player

- Born: 30 January 1986 (age 39); Kajaani, Finland
- Height: 6 ft 2 in (188 cm)
- Weight: 216 lb (98 kg; 15 st 6 lb)
- Position: Forward
- Shot: Left
- Played for: Oulun Kärpät
- NHL draft: Undrafted
- Playing career: 2004–2014

Veikko Karppinen (born 30 January 1986) is a Finnish former ice hockey player who played for Oulun Kärpät of the SM-liiga.
