= Espoo Hospital =

Hospital in Espoo, Finland

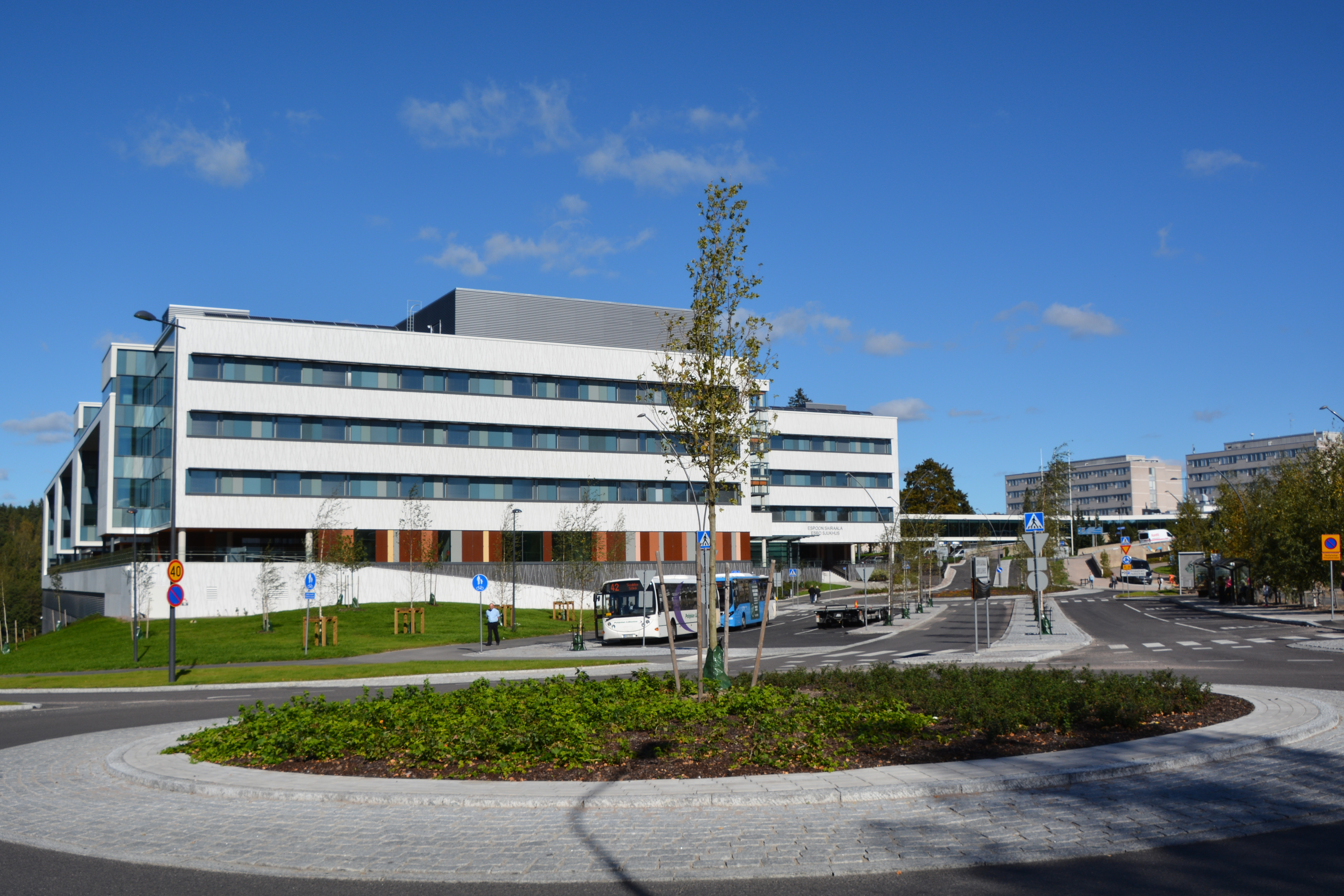
- Espoo Hospital. Jorvi Hospital is also visible in the background.

Geography
- Location: Karvasmäentie 6, 02740 Espoo, Uusimaa, Finland
- Coordinates: 60°13′19.9″N 024°41′06.7″E

History
- Founded: 2017

Links
- Website: https://www.luvn.fi/en/services/health-services/hospital-services/espoo-hospital
- Lists: Hospitals in Finland

Espoo Hospital (Finnish: Espoon sairaala, Swedish: Esbo sjukhus) is a hospital operated by the Western Uusimaa Wellbeing Services County in Karvasmäki, Espoo, in the Jorvi hospital area. The hospital specialises in the care of older people, rehabilitation and end-of-life care. It opened in 2017. It has 270 beds, all in single rooms.

The hospital is located next to Jorvi Hospital, and is connected to it by an indoor bridge.

== History ==
According to Yle, Espoo Hospital was the largest building construction project in Espoo's history when completed. It was finished about a year behind the original schedule and cost about €175 million.

The hospital replaced the Puolarmetsä and Muurala hospitals, the Jorvi health-centre ward and the Kauniainen and Kirkkonummi health-centre hospitals. Operations started gradually in March 2017. The hospital is operated by the Western Uusimaa Wellbeing Services County.

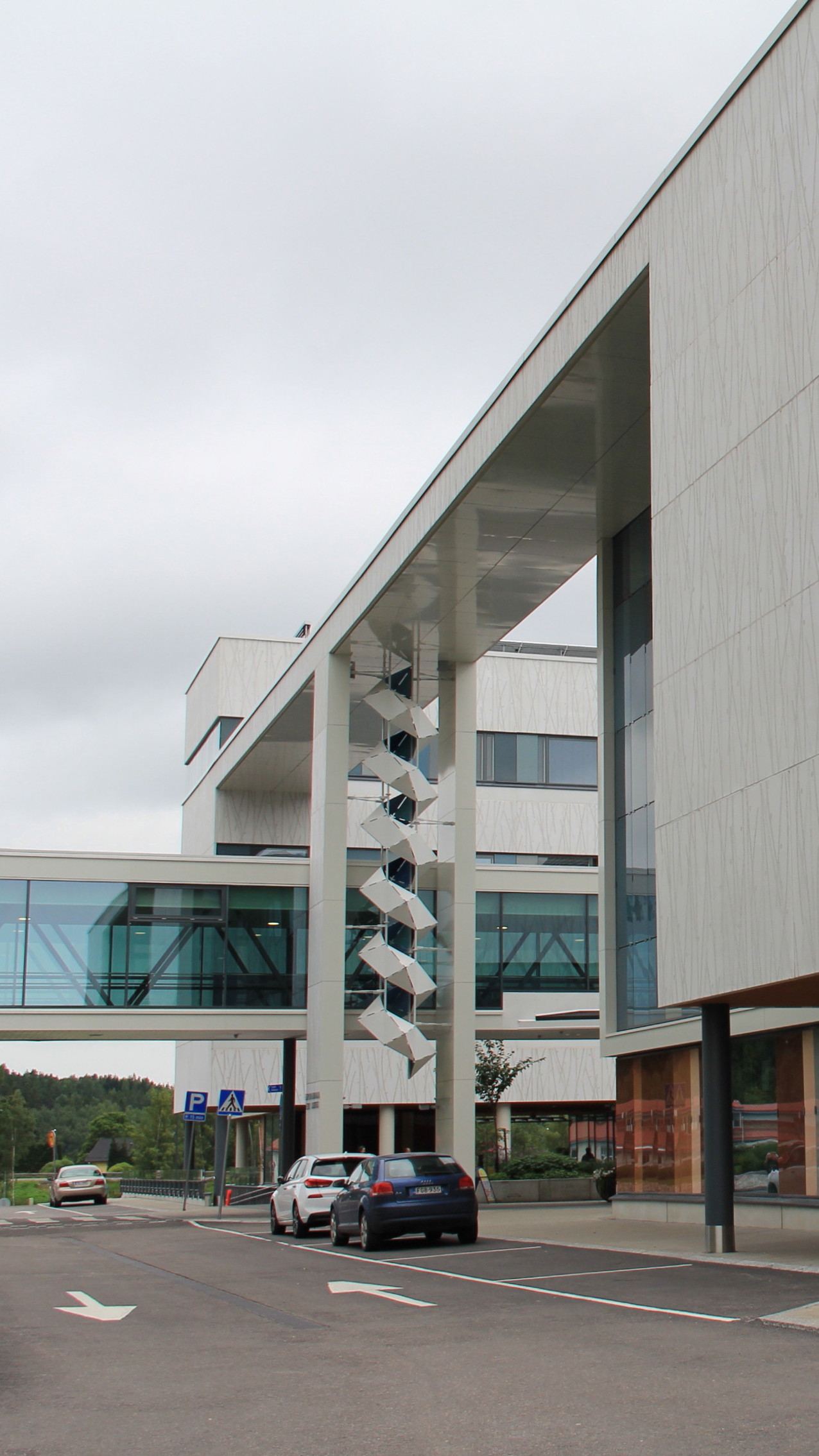
The main entrance of the hospital

=== HUS maternity operations ===
After Kätilöopisto hospital was condemned for closure because of indoor-air problems, HUS and the City of Espoo signed a letter of intent to move maternity operations to Espoo Hospital. The letter was signed on 30 June 2017, and the delivery rooms, maternity emergency services and postnatal wards were housed in Espoo Hospital in early 2018. Jorvi Hospital's maternity operations moved to Espoo Hospital at the same time. The plan was to divide births in the capital region so that the Women's Hospital would handle 9,000–10,000 and Espoo Hospital 4,000–5,000 births a year.

As of September 2026, maternity operations had returned to Jorvi Hospital's new ward building. According to HUS, clinical services in the building started in phases on 24 August 2026.

== Operations ==
Wards 1–4 treat adult patients of the Western Uusimaa Wellbeing Services County who arrive for follow-up care and rehabilitation on a physician's referral from emergency or specialised care. Treatment requires a need for hospital care that does not require specialised medical care. The emergency ward treats adult residents of the wellbeing services county who arrive for follow-up care directly from the HUS Jorvi emergency department.

Treatment is supported by a rehabilitation team of physicians, nursing staff and physio-, occupational, speech, music and nutritional therapists. Villa Glims and Villa Bell are palliative and end-of-life care wards.

== Art ==
Six new commissioned artworks were acquired for the hospital under the percent-for-art principle, and patient rooms also hold works from the collections of the Espoo Museum of Modern Art (EMMA). The lobby and dining hall hold works by Hanna Vihriälä, including Ketohanhikki.
