= Jorvi Hospital =

- The main entrance of Jorvi Hospital

Geography
- Location: Karvasmäentie 8, 02740 Espoo, Uusimaa, Finland
- Coordinates: 60°13′19.4″N 024°41′20.4″E

Organisation
- Type: General

History
- Founded: 1976

Links
- Website: https://www.hus.fi/en/patient/hospitals-and-other-units/jorvi-hospital
- Lists: Hospitals in Finland

Jorvi Hospital (Finnish: Jorvin sairaala; Swedish: Jorvs sjukhus) is a hospital in Karvasmäki, Espoo, Finland, forming part of HUS Helsinki University Hospital, which is the hospital network of HUS. It is operated by the HUS Joint Authority. It opened in 1976. The hospital area also hosts Espoo Hospital.

Jorvi provides surgical, psychiatric, paediatric, respiratory, neurological and internal-medicine care. It is an emergency hospital providing regional specialised emergency care together with the 24-hour joint emergency services of HUS specialised care and the Western Uusimaa Wellbeing Services County. The adult emergency department serves residents of Espoo, Kauniainen and Kirkkonummi aged over 16, and the paediatric emergency department treats children under 16. The Jorvi hospital area is HUS's second-largest hospital area after Meilahti.

== History ==
The hospital stands on the estate of Jorvi manor. The market town of Espoo bought the manor in 1962 from Elsa von Wright, holder of the honorary title of Counsellor of Commerce. The manor had previously served as a Finnish Red Cross convalescent home, among other uses. The hospital project of the growing market town was undertaken by Espoo, Kauniainen, the rural municipality of Helsinki, Vihti and Kirkkonummi, which formed a joint municipal authority to build a 420-bed regional hospital. The site chosen was the Jorvi estate in Karvasmäki, as the market town already owned the land, it had good transport connections and was a sufficient distance from Helsinki. The remote location was also intended to guard against municipal mergers.

Construction began in 1972. The manor's main building was demolished in 1975, and the first patients were admitted on 1 November 1976. It operated as a teaching hospital, which attracted professionals: for example, 70 applications were received for eight senior doctor posts. Operations started gradually. Espoo's allocation was 116.8 beds in early 1977, rising to 151.9 beds by the end of the year, 188 by the end of 1978 and 298 by the end of 1979, of which 20 were psychiatric beds.

The hospital was initially operated by the Jorvi Hospital joint municipal authority. After the HUS Hospital District began operating in early 2000, the Jorvi and Peijas hospitals were merged into the Helsinki University Central Hospital (HYKS) in early 2001. As part of the health and social services reform, the HUS Hospital District became the HUS Joint Authority on 1 January 2023. The joint authority has operated the hospital since then.

The national burn centre moved from Töölö to ward U2 in Jorvi's new emergency building, on 19 January 2016. Espoo Hospital was completed on the hospital campus in 2017. Some of the births at Kätilöopisto Hospital were transferred to Espoo Hospital in early 2018, along with Jorvi's maternity operations, after Kätilöopisto Hospital had been ordered to close because of indoor air problems.

During the COVID-19 pandemic, Jorvi's intensive care unit was repeatedly at full capacity. By November 2021 about 250 COVID intensive-care patients had been treated there, of whom only one had been fully vaccinated, and non-urgent surgery had to be reduced.

In December 2022 the joint emergency department was overcrowded for ten days, during which it could not admit urgent ambulance patients. About 150 patients attended the emergency department per day, and 24 of its 31 beds were occupied by patients awaiting admission. The longest wait lasted 110 hours. The cause was a shortage of nurses.

The old hospital's main entrance and access ramp were closed on 1 September 2024 because of construction work, and access was diverted via temporary routes.

Clinical services in Jorvi's new ward building began in stages in late August 2026. Espoo Hospital's maternity unit moved to the Jorvi ward building on 1 September 2026 at 9 a.m. Maternity outpatient clinics were due to follow on 5–6 October 2026.

== Buildings ==
The original hospital building was designed by the architect Reino Koivula. Espoo Hospital also operates in the Jorvi hospital area, and the buildings are connected by a skyway.

An emergency department extension of more than 17,000 square metres costing €58 million opened in January 2016, housing the adult and paediatric emergency departments, two emergency wards, ward U2, emergency radiology and the instrument maintenance centre. At the time, its emergency departments treated an average of 145 adults and 65 children per day, and the paediatric emergency department was the second-largest in Finland.

Jorvi's new five-storey ward building was completed in January 2026, when SRV handed the building over to HUS on 20 January 2026. The project's cost estimate was €259 million, making it the second-largest construction project in HUS history after the Meilahti Bridge Hospital. SRV's share of the alliance project was €200 million. The building has about 50,000 square metres of gross floor area over five floors plus a basement, and it was designed by the Triangeli consortium (UKI Arkkitehdit, Lukkaroinen Arkkitehdit and Arkkitehtitoimisto Tähti-Set). The new building replaces the ward towers S, K and N, which are in poor condition, and more than 600 professionals work there. The ward building has six adult wards and two children's wards with 367 beds in total, mostly in single-occupancy rooms. Ground- and air-source heat pumps were used for heating the construction site, achieving a construction-phase reduction in carbon dioxide emissions of about 1,979 tonnes (9.7 per cent). Artworks have been placed in the new ward building. The staircase leading to the children's outpatient clinics is decorated with animal-themed illustrations, and the maternity facilities house a leaf-themed work by illustrator Tiitu Takalo.

HUS has described Jorvi's old ward facilities as cramped. Shared patient rooms attracted publicity in May 2026, when a 76-year-old female patient reported having been placed in the same room as three male patients. HUS said that patients are allocated to rooms based on clinical need, which in practice means mixed-sex rooms.

== Operations ==
Patients in gastrointestinal surgery, plastic surgery, neurology, cardiology, respiratory medicine and internal medicine are treated in their own wards and outpatient clinics. Psychiatry has several wards and outpatient clinics, and paediatric patients have their own ward and clinics. The hospital also houses a sleep apnoea clinic, a neuromodulation unit, the Espoo Diabetes Center, which is responsible for type 1 diabetes care, as well as laboratory and imaging services.

The national burn centre is based at Jorvi on ward U2. The ward has 12 intensive-care beds, four of which are equipped for burn patients. It also comprises a burn inpatient ward, an outpatient clinic, rehabilitation facilities, an operating theatre and a tissue bank. HUS treats 50–70 intensive-care burn patients per year.

All bariatric surgery in the HUS region is centralised in Jorvi's anaesthesia and surgery unit, which uses a surgical robot. Jorvi is one of Finland's largest gastrointestinal emergency surgery centres, performing more than 3,600 emergency operations per year, with most patients staying on the wards for less than 24 hours.

Jorvi's maternity unit is the second-largest in Finland. In 2025 the unit recorded 4,771 births at Espoo Hospital. Jorvi handles births from week 35 of pregnancy onwards. The new unit has 12 delivery rooms, six induction rooms and five monitoring rooms.

Students participate in care at the hospital with the patient's consent. The hospital also houses an interprofessional learning unit operating under Ward K6 of the Abdominal Center, with eight beds staffed around the clock. Each shift includes a student working with a supervisor. Anaesthesia and Surgery Ward L/Day Surgery received an honourable mention in the 2023 Good Work Community award. The unit's patient-feedback recommendation index score is consistently above 90.

== Heliport ==
The hospital has a helicopter landing site (ICAO: EFEJ). After the Traficom heliport regulations entered into force on 1 January 2025, Jorvi is one of only two fully compliant hospital landing sites in mainland Finland. The other is Oulu University Hospital. Other hospital landing sites were also affected: the Peijas landing site was closed and the Meilahti landing site requires renovation estimated at €8 million.

== See also ==
- Espoo Hospital
- List of hospitals in Finland
