= Corporate-owned life insurance =

Life insurance policies taken out by workers' employers

Corporate-owned life insurance (COLI), is life insurance on employees' lives that is owned by the employer, with benefits payable either to the employer or directly to the employee's families. Other names for the practice include janitor's insurance and dead peasants insurance. When the employer is a bank, the insurance is known as a bank owned life insurance (BOLI).

COLI was originally purchased on the lives of key employees and executives by a company to provide cover against the financial cost of losing key employees to unexpected death, the risk of recruiting and training replacements of necessary or highly trained personnel, or to fund corporate obligations to redeem stock upon the death of an owner. This use is commonly known as "key man" or "key person" insurance. Although this article refers only to practice and policy in the United States, key person insurance is used in other countries as well.

Primarily in the 1990s, some companies aggressively insured a broad base of employees, as part of general hiring requirements. During the hiring process, employees sign many documents, including life, health and welfare coverage agreements or applications for insurance. Additionally, up until 1984, certain premiums for life insurance were leveraged and deducted. Even today, when a COLI plan's death benefits are paid to an employee's family directly, the company paying the premiums can deduct them from corporate profits and earnings.

Today, COLI is most common for senior executives of a firm, but its use for general employees is still sometimes practiced.

== United States tax law history ==
Under the Internal Revenue Code (IRC) dealing with life insurance benefits paid due to the death of the insured, the benefits are usually excluded from the taxable income of the beneficiary.

Because of the tax-free nature of death benefits, the IRC prohibits the deduction of the premiums paid for life insurance when the premium payor is also the beneficiary of the death benefit rather than the individual employee and their family. In addition, loans from insurers secured by policy values are not income and earnings credited to an owner's policy values (known as "inside buildup") by the insurance company are not currently taxed (and may escape taxation altogether if such earnings are not distributed other than as part of the death benefits paid upon the death of the insured).

=== 1950s: leveraged insurance ===
Interest incurred on indebtedness has historically been deductible, (although the deduction of "personal" interest was largely eliminated in 1986), and in the 1950s a type of "leveraged insurance" transaction began being marketed that permitted an insurance owner to in effect deduct the cost of paying for insurance by (1) paying large premiums to create cash values, (2) "borrowing" against the cash value to in effect strip out the large premiums, and (3) paying deductible "interest" back to the insurer, which was in turn credited to the policy's cash value as tax-deferred earnings on the policy that could fund the insurer's legitimate charges against policy value for cost of insurance, etc.

The Internal Revenue Service (IRS), via the Supreme Court case Knetsch v. United States (1960), had early success in challenging the bona fides of these types of arrangements as creating legitimate debt and interest eligible to be deducted. However, subsequent court losses and IRC amendments weakened their position, appearing to permit tax-deductible borrowing to provide funds to pay insurance premiums, so long as such borrowing did not account for more than three of the first seven annual premiums on the policy (the "4 out of 7" test).

=== 1980s: tax shelters ===
Another IRC amendment limited the amount that could be borrowed (and yet yield deductible interest payments) to $50,000 with respect to any one insured. Although the 4 out of 7 test was exploited in the 1980s by businesses seeking to in effect pay for insurance on employees/shareholders, e.g., on a deductible basis, the introduction of the US$50,000 cap/insured in 1986 in turn led to the creation of broad-based leveraged COLI transactions, i.e., those in which the employer would purchase life insurance on hundreds or thousands of (usually low-level) employees, that would produce tax savings on interest deductions in excess of the actual cost to the employer of engaging in the transaction. These transactions were deemed by the IRS to be "tax shelters."

In a typical broad-based leveraged COLI transaction, a corporate employer would purchase policies on masses of lower-level employees, sometimes without the employees' knowledge or consent. When an insured employee died, the company received the death benefits, and the employee's family typically received either a small portion of the proceeds or nothing. These policies could remain in place even after the employee quits or retires.

=== 1990s to present: limited reform ===
Ultimately, the IRS won court cases against several leveraged COLI investors, including Camelot Music, Winn-Dixie, American Electric Power, and Dow Chemical. Other similar investors settled their tax cases with the IRS on a basis mostly favorable to the IRS. Meanwhile, Congress amended the IRC several times again to both ensure that the prohibition on borrowing (on a deductible basis) to fund insurance acquisitions was clear and to deny the tax-free nature of death benefits to corporate employer in some situations (e.g., if the insured was not provided with adequate advance notice and an opportunity to block the insurance acquisition or if the insured was not an employee of the corporation within a year of his or her death).

So long as the employer complies with the new rules (adopted in 2006 and characterized as the "COLI Best Practices Act"), however, the tax-free nature of the death benefits and the tax deferral on earnings credited to policy value remain.

The COLI Best Practices Provision, within the Pension Protection Act of 2006, was signed into law on August 17, 2006. This provision is designed to codify industry "best practices" regarding employer-owned life insurance and amend the Internal Revenue Code of 1986 by introducing conditions that must be met in order to exclude from gross income the proceeds from company-owned life insurance. The Act amends Section 101 of the Internal Revenue Code by adding subsection (j), “treatment of Certain Employer-Owned Life insurance Contracts,” and adds Section 60391, “Returns and Records with respect to Employer-Owned Life Insurance Contracts.”

Under Section 101(j), the employer-owned death benefit proceeds will be considered eligible for exclusion from the employer's income provided all the following Notice and Consent Requirements and one of the Specified Exceptions are met.

Notice and Consent Requirements

The Employee must, prior to the issuance of the insurance contract:

1. Be notified in writing that the employer intends to insure the employee’s life and the maximum face amount for which the employee could be insured at the time the contract is issued.
2. Provide written consent to be insured under the contract during and after active employment.
3. Be informed in writing if the employer will be a sole or partial beneficiary of any death benefits.

Specified Exception:
The insured was an employee at any time during the 12-month period before the insured’s death.

Specified Exception:
Directors and Highly Compensated Employees: At time of contract issue, the insured employee was a director, or a 5% or greater owner of the business at any time during the preceding year, or received compensation in excess of $95,000, adjusted for future inflation, in the preceding year, or was one of the five highest-paid officers, or was among the highest-paid 35% of all employees.

According to one source, Hartford Life Insurance estimated that one-quarter of all Fortune 500 companies have COLI policies, which cover the lives of about 5 million employees.

== See also ==
- H. H. Holmes - a serial killer who took out life insurance policies on his employees, then killed them.
