= OYS Psychiatry =

- Northern Ostrobothnia Hospital District
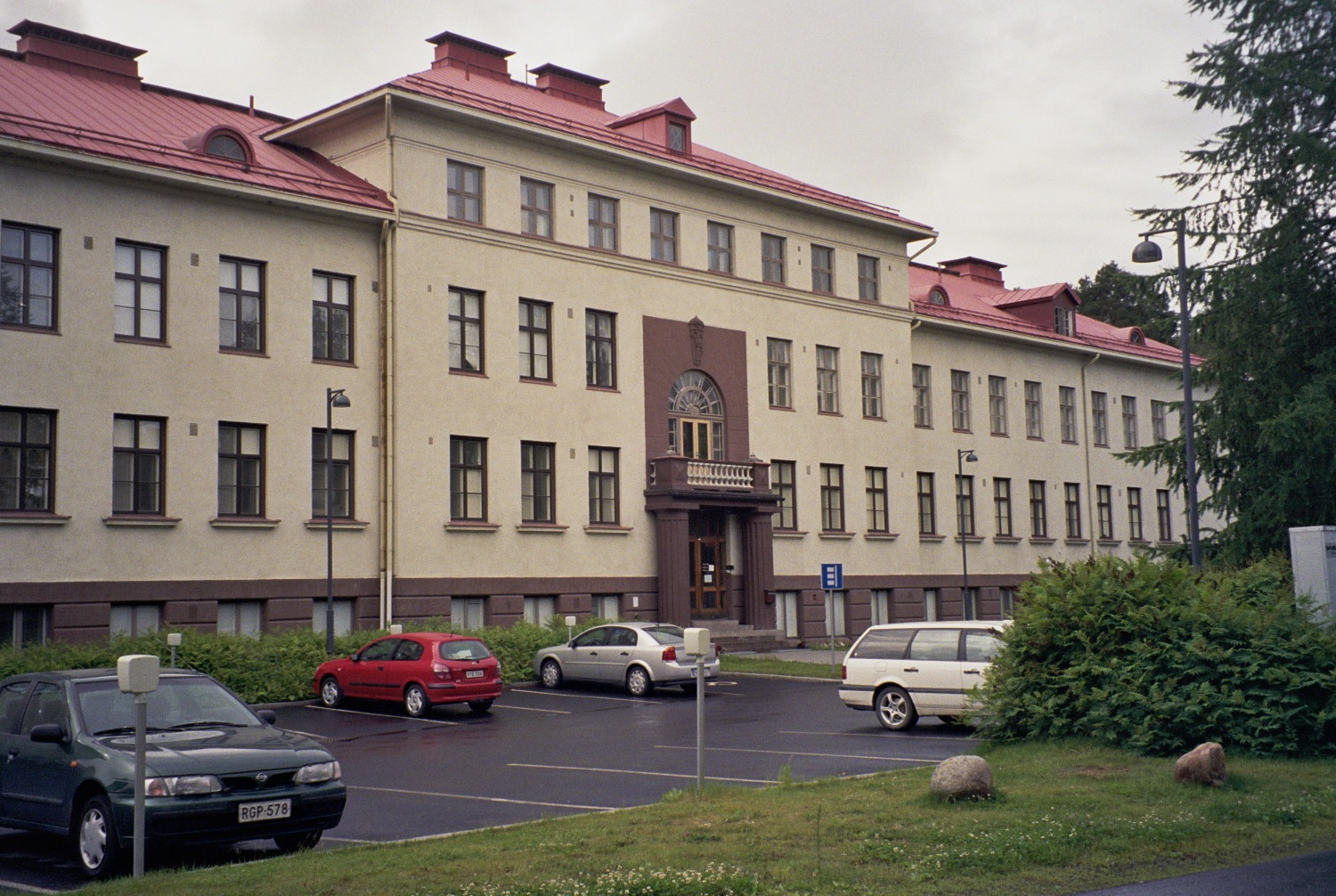
- Former Oulunsuu Hospital building, nowadays containing e.g. the acute youth psychiatric ward.

Geography
- Location: Oulu, Northern Ostrobothnia, Finland
- Coordinates: 65.015811°N 25.515644°E

Organisation
- Type: Teaching
- Affiliated university: University of Oulu

Services
- Emergency department: Yes
- Speciality: Psychiatry

Links
- Website: www.ppshp.fi/en/
- Lists: Hospitals in Finland

OYS Psychiatry is the unit of psychiatry of the Oulu University Hospital (OYS), mainly located in the Peltola city district in Oulu, Finland. It provides psychiatric special health care, emergency- and crisis services, outpatient care, and other services for the member municipalities and the whole catchment area for highly specialized medical care (erityisvastuualue) of the Northern Ostrobothnia Hospital District, as well as for the insurance companies and judiciaries of the said district. It is the most important psychiatric hospital in Northern Finland.

== Operation and location ==
The unit consists of five polyclinics, 16 wards and three other operational branches. Most of the psychiatric wards and clinics are located in Peltola, Oulu. The psychiatric and youth psychiatric polyclinics; wards numbered 50, 70, 73, 74, 75, 77, 78, 81, 82, 84, 87 and 88 and the unit of forensic psychiatry are located in Peltola, whereas the general hospital psychiatric and child psychiatric clinics and wards are located in the nearby city district of Kontinkangas, where the main somatic units of OYS are located in. There is another youth psychiatric polyclinic in Ylivieska and the early rehabilitation ward No.85 is located in Liminka. The operational units in Peltola are mostly located in the premises of the former Oulunsuu Psychiatric Hospital.

Youths with the most difficult symptoms in Northern Finland are generally treated in the ward No.70.

== History ==
The absence of a mental hospital in the Oulu Province was seen as a major problem in the 1920s, and already in the year 1921 the city and the surrounding municipalities started to found a District Mental Hospital in Oulu. The hospital was built in Oulunsuu, an area previously called Dalinkangas (present-day Peltola) which was located in between the road Kajaanintie and the district of Värttö. The reason for choosing Dalinkangas as the location of the hospital was that the area had great connections, was separated from bigger centers of population, yet not too far from them so that connecting it to the mains was not too expensive. The main District Mental Hospital building by the architect Axel Mörne was completed in 1925, followed by the other hospital buildings in 1933, -37 and -56. The Peltola city district started to evolve near the hospital in the 1940s. The District Mental Hospital was later renamed the Central Mental Hospital of the Federation of Municipalities and lastly the Oulunsuu Hospital. In the beginning of the 1990s, the Oulunsuu Hospital, Heikinharju Hospital and OYKS clinic of psychiatry formed the current OYS Clinic of Psychiatry and the clinic was attached to the Northern Ostrobothnia Hospital District. The Heikinharju hospital was shut down and the Oulunsuu Hospital was formally shut down but most of the buildings previously owned by the Oulunsuu Hospital were immediately reopened as the unit of psychiatry of the Oulu University Hospital. Some of the buildings are now in residential use, and some of the clinics and wards have moved to the nearby Kontinkangas district. Most of the wards, clinics and management premises still remain in Peltola.

== Popular culture ==
The title of the 2019 debut album by the group Maustetytöt, Kaikki tiet vievät Peltolaan (lit. 'All Roads Lead to Peltola'), is a reference to the hospital.
