= Simkins v. Moses H. Cone Memorial Hospital =

United States federal case

Simkins v. Cone
- Court: United States Court of Appeals for the Fourth Circuit
- Full case name: G. C. Simkins, Jr., A. W. Blount, Jr., et al., Plaintiffs, and United States of America, Intervenor v. Moses H. Cone Memorial Hospital, a Corporation, Harold Bettis, Director of the Moses H. Cone Memorial Hospital, and Wesley Long Community Hospital, a Corporation, and A. O. Smith, Administrator of the Wesley Long Community Hospital
- Argued: April 1, 1963
- Decided: November 1, 1963
- Citation: 323 F.2d 959

Court membership
- Judges sitting: Simon Sobeloff, Clement Haynsworth, Herbert Stephenson Boreman, Albert Vickers Bryan, J. Spencer Bell (en banc)

Case opinions
- Majority: Sobeloff, joined by Bryan, Bell
- Dissent: Haynsworth, joined by Boreman

Laws applied
- U.S. Const. amend. XIV

Simkins v. Moses H. Cone Memorial Hospital, 323 F.2d 959 (4th Cir. 1963), was a federal case, reaching the Fourth Circuit Court of Appeals, which held that "separate but equal" racial segregation in publicly funded hospitals was a violation of equal protection under the United States Constitution.

== Background ==
George Simkins, Jr. was a dentist and NAACP leader in Greensboro, North Carolina. One of his patients, an African-American person, developed an abscessed tooth and Simkins felt that the patient required medical treatment, but none of the local hospitals that would accept African-American patients had space for the patient. With the assistance of the NAACP and other medical professionals in the area, Simkins filed suit, arguing that because the Moses H. Cone Memorial Hospital and Wesley Long Hospital had received $2.8 million through the Hill–Burton Act that they were subject to the Constitutional guarantee of equal protection. The suit was filed in February 1962.

At district court, the suit was dismissed, the court finding that there was no involvement of the state or federal government. This ruling was appealed to the Fourth Circuit Court of Appeals in November 1963.

== Decision ==
In a 3-2 decision, the Fourth Circuit overturned the district ruling, looking to whether the hospitals and the government were so intertwined by funding and law that the hospitals' "activities are also the activities of those governments and performed under their aegis without the private body necessarily becoming either their instrumentality or their agent in a strict sense." The Court held that to be the case.

The Court then found the provision for segregated "separate but equal" facilities to be unconstitutional, and it struck down that portion of the Hill–Burton Act.

A dissent, authored by Judge Haynsworth and joined by Judge Boreman, argued that the hospitals' operations involved no "state action". They noted that hospitals had preceded the creation of the Hill–Burton Act.

The case was appealed to the Supreme Court, who denied certiorari. As a result, the Appeals court ruling stood, but was only precedent within the jurisdiction of the Fourth Circuit—Maryland, North Carolina, South Carolina, Virginia and West Virginia.

== Subsequent developments ==
In 1964, Title VI of the Civil Rights Act of 1964 banned discrimination on the basis of race, color, or national origin for any agency receiving state or federal funding.

== Sources ==
- Reynolds, P. Preston (1997). "Hospitals and Civil Rights, 1945-1963: The Case of Simkins v Moses H. Cone Memorial Hospital". Annals of Internal Medicine. 126 (11): 898–906. doi:10.7326/0003-4819-126-11-199706010-00009. ISSN 0003-4819. PMID 9163292. S2CID 41784971.
