= Health in Finland =

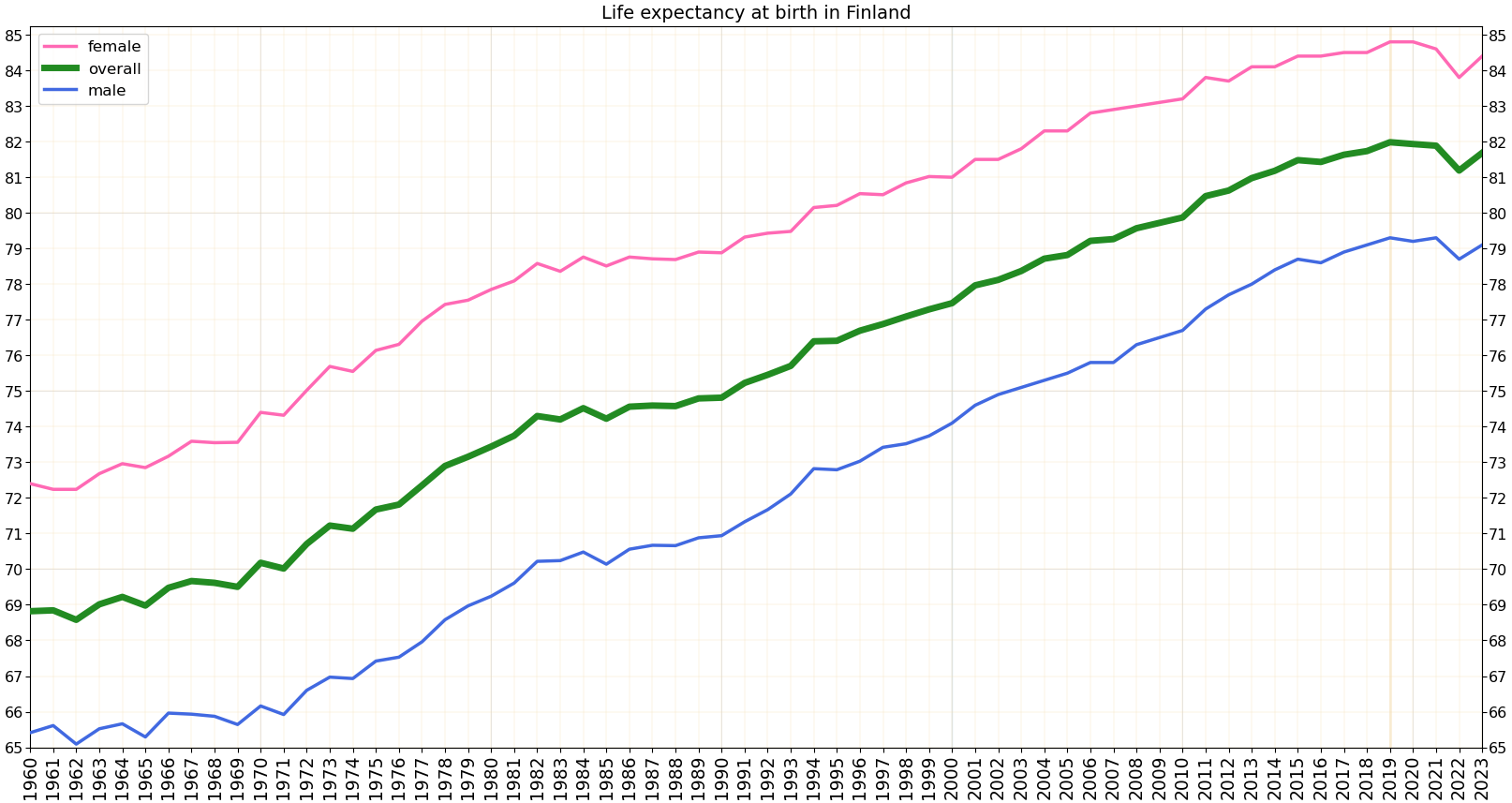
Life expectancy at birth in Finland

The major causes of deaths in Finland are cardiovascular diseases, malignant tumors, dementia and Alzheimer's disease, respiratory diseases, alcohol related diseases and accidental poisoning by alcohol. In 2010, the leading causes of death among men aged 15 to 64 were alcohol-related deaths, ischaemic heart disease, accident, suicides, lung cancer and cerebrovascular diseases. Among women the leading causes were breast cancer, alcohol-related deaths, accidents, suicides, ischemic heart disease and lung cancer.

== Healthcare system ==
Finland is well known for its high-quality healthcare. Public health services are available to everyone who lives in the country. Finland has both public health services and private health care services. The Finnish Ministry of Social Affairs and Health supports the welfare of people in Finland via social and health services and by ensuring income security. Local governments and municipalities are responsible for organising good social and health care services for their residents.

Finnish healthcare focuses on disease prevention and health promotion. Preventative healthcare is provided for different age groups, such as maternal healthcare for pregnant women, and care for newborn babies and children until school age. School healthcare is offered to school-aged children, as well as student healthcare to youths and young students. In Finland, it is required that employers offer healthcare services to their workers. Organised and comprehensive disease prevention and health promotion is one of the key factors for a well-functioning system and the health outcomes are good.

Finland has high-quality specialised medical care, which is usually provided at hospitals. The most demanding treatment is provided in five hospital districts, which are University Hospitals of Helsinki, Turku, Tampere, Oulu and Kuopio. Every healthcare professional is either a licensed professional or professional with a protected occupational title. This means that the individual healthcare professional has a license to work due to completing a training programme in the relevant legislation and decrees.

== Health status ==
A new measure of expected human capital calculated for 195 countries from 1990 to 2016 was published by The Lancet in September 2018. Finland had the highest level of expected human capital: 28·4 health, education, and learning-adjusted expected years lived between age 20 and 64 years.

=== Alcohol consumption ===
The total annual alcohol consumption has risen from 7.6 litres (in 1985) to 10.0 litres of 100% alcohol equivalent per capita in 2010. There has been a small reduction in alcohol consumption in recent years. Alcohol use is highest in the Northern Finland with 10.9 litres and lowest at the Åland Islands with 5.7 litres per person. Although the rate of consumption is average when compared to other western countries, binge drinking, especially amongst teenagers, has remained as a characteristic of Finnish drinking habits. Finland has a national alcohol programme to reduce the long-term effects of alcohol consumption. The World Health Organization has published a list of countries by alcohol consumption.

=== Smoking rates ===
The percentage of Finnish adults who smoked in 2011

Smoking among adults has shown a marked decline over the past thirty years in most OECD countries. Much of this decline can be attributed to policies aimed at reducing tobacco consumption through public awareness campaigns, advertising bans and increased taxation. Smoking in Finland has reduced, and now the smoking rates among adults in Finland in 2009 stood at 18.6%, lower than the OECD average of 22.3%.

=== Drug usage ===
Drug use is not a major public health problem in Finland. The most commonly used drug is cannabis. According to a study from 2008, the percentage of the population aged 15 to 69 who had at some point in their lives tried cannabis was 13%; 3% of the population had used cannabis within the previous 12 months.

=== Obesity ===
Overweight and obesity are common in Finland. Half of all adults are overweight, and every fifth adult is obese. The weight of men has increased since the 1970s, in women since the 1980s. Among the Nordic countries, Finland ranks the highest in a percentage of adults who are overweight. In comparison to other European countries, Finland is slightly above the average but overweight is still more common in Southern Europe and Great Britain. Overweight among children and adolescents has also become widespread. The number of overweight 12- to 18-year-olds has nearly tripled in the past four decades. 10% of boys and 15% of girls in preschool were overweight in a follow-up from 2007 to 2009. In 2022, Finland became the third fattest country in Europe, a rapid climb from 2014 when the country was ranked 15th.

=== Communicable diseases ===
HIV/AIDS is not a major public health concern in Finland. The prevalence among adult population on 2009 was 0.1%. HIV/AIDS is much more common in other European countries than in Finland. It had the lowest rate of death from communicable diseases in Europe (9 per 100,000) in 2015.

=== Noncommunicable diseases ===
The most significant public health problems are currently circulatory diseases, cancer, musculoskeletal diseases and mental health problems. Emerging problems are obesity, chronic lung diseases and type 2 diabetes. 300,000 Finns are diagnosed with diabetes. Approximately 200,000 have type 2 diabetes unknowingly and many more have prediabetes. The number of people with diabetes is estimated to double in 10 years. Most of these cases could be prevented with healthy lifestyles, i.e. sufficient level of physical activity, obtaining normal weight and eating healthy.

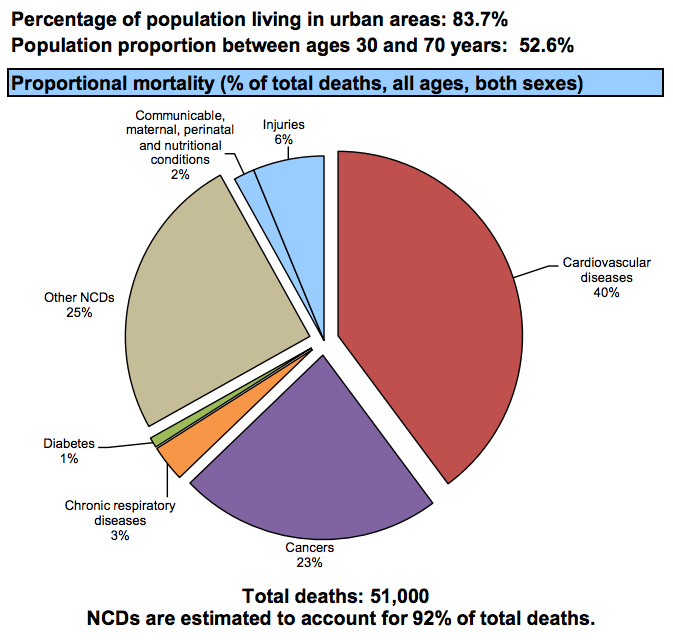
Proportional mortality (% of total deaths, all ages, both sexes)

Major causes of deaths in Finland are cardiovascular diseases, malignant tumours, dementia and Alzheimer's disease, respiratory diseases, alcohol-related diseases and accidental poisoning by alcohol. In 2010, the leading causes of death among men aged 15 to 64 were alcohol-related deaths, ischaemic heart disease, accident, suicides, lung cancer and cerebrovascular diseases. Among women the leading causes were breast cancer, alcohol-related deaths, accidents, suicides, ischaemic heart disease and lung cancer.

=== Mental health ===
Suicide mortality in Finland has generally been one of the highest in Europe, but it has decreased to 18 per 100,000 population in 2005. One reason for this may be the large national suicide prevention project which was carried out between 1986 and 1996. The World Health Organization has compiled a list of countries by suicide rate. There is a high level of education of mental health workers in Finland and several effective mental health programs have been conducted in at-risk groups.

== Sustainable Development Goal 3 ==
=== Maternal mortality ===
One of the Sustainable Development Goal 3 (SDG3) targets is to reduce the global maternal mortality ratio to less than 70 per 100,000 live births, by 2030.

Finland is one of the countries that has achieved the lowest maternal mortality ratio. After 2010, only three mothers die annually for every 100,000 births.

=== Child and infant mortality ===
The proposed SDG target for aims to end, by 2030, preventable deaths of newborns and children under 5 years of age, with all countries aiming to reduce neonatal mortality to at least as low as 12 deaths per 1,000 live births and under-5 mortality to at least as low as 25 deaths per 1,000 live births.

In Finland, the mortality of under 5 years of age was 6.8 deaths per 1,000 live births in 1990, and 2.3 in 2021, and under 1 year of age it was 5.7 deaths per 1,000 live births in 1990 and 1.8 in 2021.

Child mortality in Finland 1990–2021
	1990	2021
Under-5	6.8	2.3
Under-1	5.7	1.8

Life expectancy at birth was 81.5 in Finland in 2021. Among males the life expectancy was 79 and among females 84.1.

== Vaccination program ==
In Finland, there is a comprehensive national vaccination program. Child health clinics, school healthcare and local health centers offer vaccinations against 12 different diseases for every child, free of charge. HPV vaccines were given first to girls, but as of 2020, HPV vaccines are also offered to boys. For adults, the vaccination program recommends giving booster doses of tetanus and diphtheria on a set schedule, and other vaccines as boosters if necessary. Free influenza vaccines are offered every year for vulnerable groups and those at risk. In 2009, the rotavirus vaccination was introduced and added to the national vaccination program. Before that, rotaviruses caused many outbreaks of diarrhea every year. Over 11,000 children under 5 years old required healthcare services such as hospitalisations and outpatient visits during the biggest outbreaks.

Vaccination program by age for children and adults
Age	Protection against	Vaccine
2 months	Rotavirus diarrhea	Rotavirus
3 months	Pneumonia, ear infections, meningitis and blood poisoning	Pneumococcal Conjugate (PVC)
3 months	Rotavirus diarrhea	Rotavirus
3 months	Tetanus, whooping cough, polio, diphtheria and Hib diseases (meningitis, laryngitis and blood poisoning)	5-in-1 vaccine DTaP-IPV-Hib
5 months	Pneumonia, blood poisoning, ear infections, meningitis	Pneumococcal Conjugate (PCV)
5 months	Rotavirus diarrhea	Rotavirus
5 months	Tetanus, diphtheria, polio, whooping cough and Hib diseases (meningitis, laryngitis and blood poisoning)	5-in-1 vaccine DTaP-IPV-Hib
12 months	Pneumonia, meningitis, ear infections and blood poisoning	Pneumococcal Conjugate (PCV)
12 months	Tetanus, diphtheria, polio, whooping cough and Hib diseases (meningitis, laryngitis and blood poisoning)	5-in-1 vaccine DTaP-IPV-Hib
12–18 months	Measles, rubella and mumps	MMR (recommended to be given at 12 moths of age)
6 months - 6 years	Influenza (annually)	Influenza
1,5 – 11 years	Varicella (Chicken pox)	Varicella (only for the children who have not had chicken box before)
4 years	Tetanus, whooping cough, polio and diphtheria	4-in-1 vaccine DTaP-IPV
6 years	Measles, rubella, mumps and chicken pox	MMRV
10–12 years	Papillomavirus caused cancers (cervical cancer, vaginal cancer, external genitalia cancer, and cancers in anus, penis, head and neck area)	HPV
14–15 years	Tetanus, Diphtheria and whooping cough	dtap (booster)
25 years	Tetanus, Diphtheria and whooping cough	dtap (booster)
45 years	Tetanus and diphtheria	dT (booster)
65 years	Diphtheria and tetanus (then every 10 years)	dT (booster)
65 years	Influenza (annually)	Influenza

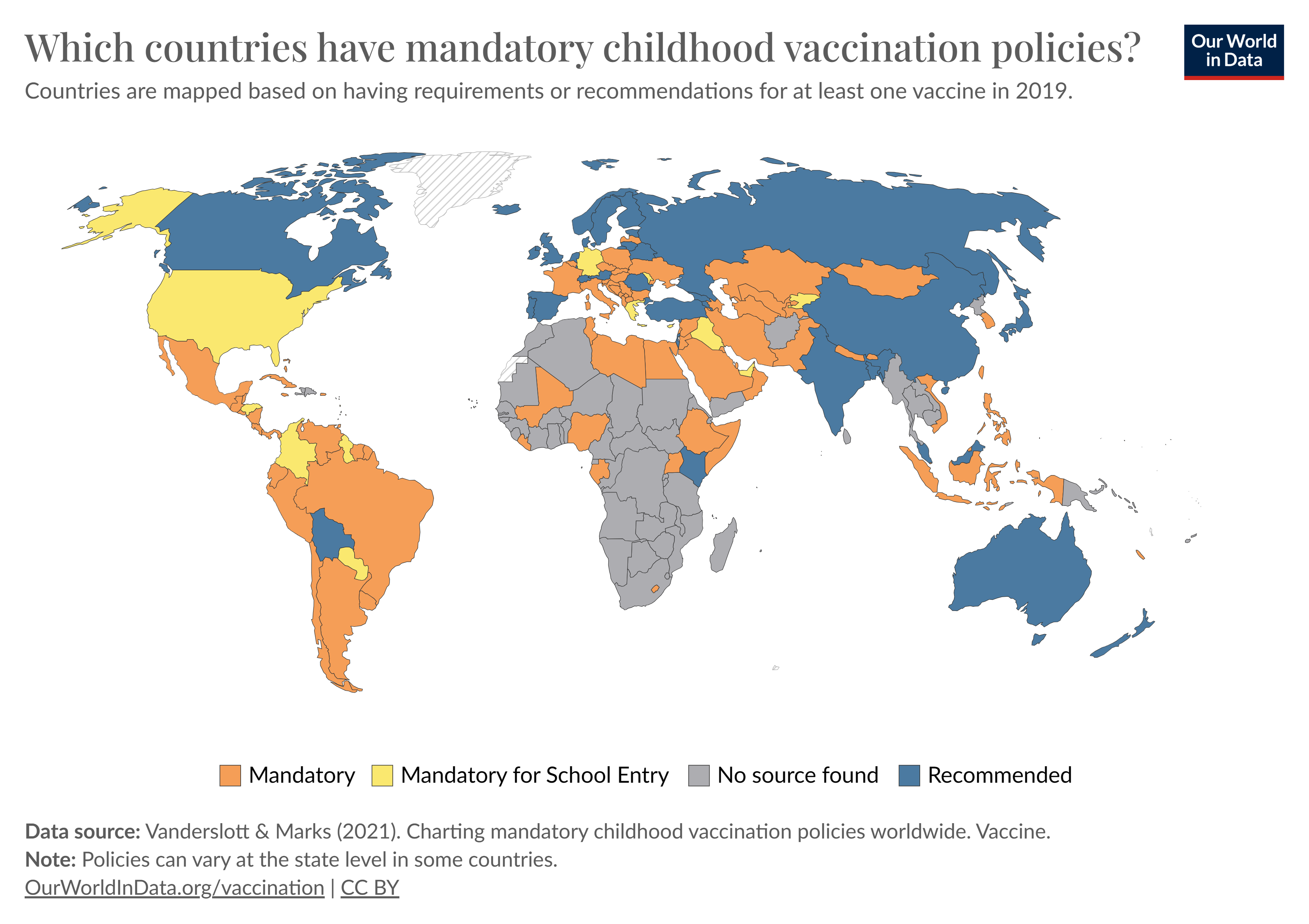
Countries that have mandatory childhood vaccination policies (2019)

The Finnish Institute for Health and Welfare (THL) and the Ministry of Social Affairs and Health are responsible for decision-making regarding the vaccination program. THL keeps track of the vaccination coverage within different age and risk groups in Finland, by maintaining a national vaccination register where data is retrieved from patient record systems. The national vaccination program is one of the biggest reason that many communicable diseases have almost fully disappeared from the country.

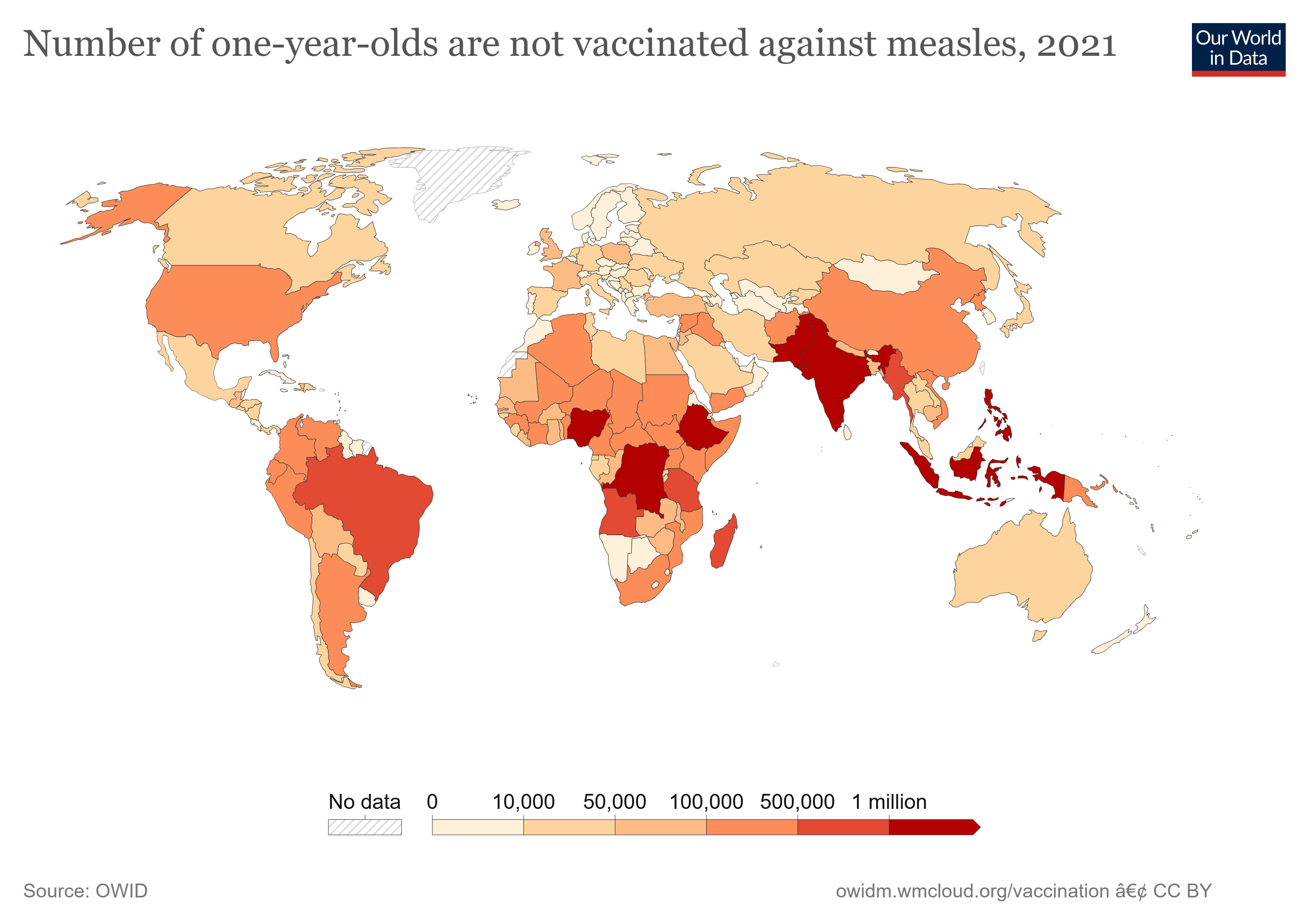
Number of one-year-olds who are not vaccinated against measles, 2021, world map

In 2024, the vaccination coverage among young children born in 2021 was nearly 98 per cent. Around 95 per cent within the same age group have also been vaccinated against rubella, measles and mumps. The data shows that most of the children in Finland have started the 5-in-1 vaccination series. The accurate coverage of vaccinations might be even higher than the data shows and therefore there is still improvement to be made with regional data collection.

== See also ==
- Healthcare in Finland
- Finnish heritage disease
- Northern epilepsy syndrome
