= Shelton v. Tucker =

- Supreme Court of the United States

Argued November 7, 1960 Decided December 12, 1960
- Full case name: B.T. Shelton et al. v. Everett Tucker Jr. et al.
- Citations: 364 U.S. 479 (more)

Holding
- The Arkansas disclosure law violates the First Amendment.

Court membership
- Chief Justice Earl Warren Associate Justices Hugo Black · Felix Frankfurter; William O. Douglas · Tom C. Clark; John M. Harlan II · William J. Brennan Jr. Charles E. Whittaker · Potter Stewart

Case opinions
- Majority: Stewart, joined by Warren, Black, Douglas, Brennan
- Dissent: Frankfurter, joined by Clark, Harlan, Whittaker
- Dissent: Harlan, joined by Frankfurter, Clark, Whittaker

Laws applied
- U.S. Const. amend. I

Shelton v. Tucker, 364 U.S. 479 (1960), was a case decided by the Supreme Court of the United States. By a 5–4 vote, the Court struck down an Arkansas law imposing disclosure requirements on public schoolteachers, reasoning that they were unconstitutionally overbroad.

== Background ==
In 1958, Arkansas's legislature held a special session to address school desegregation. It enacted a law that required each public schoolteacher to file a yearly affidavit listing all organizations to which they had belonged or given money in the preceding five years. The intent of the law was to discover which teachers were members of the NAACP, and the Capitol Citizens' Council stated that it would use the affidavits (which were not required to be kept confidential) to seek those teachers' removal. B.T. Shelton, an African-American schoolteacher and NAACP member from Little Rock, refused to sign the affidavit; when he lost his job after twenty-five years of service, he challenged the law in federal court, represented by the NAACP. Although the three-judge district court, which consisted of Judges John B. Sanborn Jr., John E. Miller, and J. Smith Henley, ruled unconstitutional a separate law forbidding public employees to be members of the NAACP, it upheld the affidavit requirement. Shelton sought review before the U.S. Supreme Court, which agreed to hear the appeal on January 25, 1960. The case was consolidated with another in which the Arkansas Supreme Court had upheld the law, and oral arguments were heard (with Shelton represented by Robert L. Carter) on November 7.

== Decision ==
In a 5–4 decision delivered on December 12, 1960, the Supreme Court reversed the lower courts' judgments, holding that the affidavit law violated the First Amendment. The majority opinion was authored by Justice Potter Stewart and joined by Chief Justice Earl Warren and Justices Hugo Black, William O. Douglas, and William J. Brennan Jr. Justices Felix Frankfurter, Tom C. Clark, John Marshall Harlan II, and Charles Evans Whittaker dissented in two opinions written by Frankfurter and Harlan.

=== Majority opinion ===
In his majority opinion, Stewart accepted that it could sometimes be appropriate to question teachers about their associations, for instance to ensure that they could spend their time focused on teaching. He distinguished the previous cases of NAACP v. Alabama and Bates v. Little Rock on the basis that, unlike in those cases, the state had a legitimate interest in its inquiry (investigating teachers' competence and ability). The Court instead struck down the law on the grounds that it was too broad since it required teachers to disclose associations that "could have no possible bearing" on their ability to teach. For Stewart, forcing a teacher "to list, without number, every conceivable kind of associational ties—social, professional, political, avocational, or religious"—constituted a "comprehensive interference with associational freedom". He therefore struck down the law, writing that it was not narrowly tailored to its goal and instead possessed an "unlimited and indiscriminate sweep". By resolving the case on that basis, the Court did not have to address the legislature's motive for passing the law.

=== Frankfurter's dissent ===
In a dissent joined by Clark, Harlan, and Whittaker, Frankfurter conceded that, as an opponent of intrusions on academic freedom, he might "find displeasure with the Arkansas legislation under review". Still, seeking to maintain "the distinction between private views and constitutional restrictions", he argued that the law was not unconstitutional. He reasoned that the law reflected a valid state interest since teachers might participate in so many organizations as to interfere with their work, and he also suggested that the answers "may serve the purpose of making known to school authorities persons who come into contact with the teacher in all of the phases of his activity in the community, and who can be questioned, if need be, concerning the teacher's conduct in matters which this Court can certainly not now say are lacking in any pertinence to professional fitness". For Frankfurter, it was enough that the state have a rational basis for seeking the information.

=== Harlan's dissent ===
Harlan's dissent, which Frankfurter, Clark, and Whittaker joined, also argued that the law was constitutionally permissible, although it took a more speech-protective approach than Frankfurter's. Harlan wrote that while the Court's ruling had "a natural tendency to enlist support" in light of the context in which the case arose, he considered it impossible "to determine a priori the place where the line should be drawn between what would be permissible inquiry and overbroad inquiry".
