= List of United States Supreme Court cases, volume 364 =

This is a list of all the United States Supreme Court cases from volume 364 of the United States Reports:

| Case name | Citation | Date decided |
|---|---|---|
| Am. Trucking Ass'ns, Inc. v. United States | 364 U.S. 1 | 1960 |
| Cont'l Grain Co. v. Barge FBL-585 | 364 U.S. 19 | 1960 |
| Armstrong v. United States | 364 U.S. 40 | 1960 |
| United States v. Dege | 364 U.S. 51 | 1960 |
| Gonzales v. United States | 364 U.S. 59 | 1960 |
| United States v. Cannelton Sewer Pipe Co. | 364 U.S. 76 | 1960 |
| Massey Motors, Inc. v. United States | 364 U.S. 92 | 1960 |
| Hertz Corp. v. United States | 364 U.S. 122 | 1960 |
| Comm'r v. Gillette Motor Transp., Inc. | 364 U.S. 130 | 1960 |
| Sunray Mid-Continent Oil Co. v. FPC | 364 U.S. 137 | 1960 |
| Sun Oil Co. v. FPC | 364 U.S. 170 | 1960 |
| Wolfe v. North Carolina | 364 U.S. 177 | 1960 |
| Elkins v. United States | 364 U.S. 206 | 1960 |
| Rios v. United States | 364 U.S. 253 | 1960 |
| Ohio ex rel. Eaton v. Price | 364 U.S. 263 | 1960 |
| McCrary v. Indiana | 364 U.S. 277 | 1960 |
| R.R. Workers v. Balt. & Ohio R.R. Co. | 364 U.S. 278 | 1960 |
| McGrath v. Rhay | 364 U.S. 279 | 1960 |
| Luckenbach S.S. Co. v. United States | 364 U.S. 280 | 1960 |
| Livingston v. United States | 364 U.S. 281 | 1960 |
| Euziere v. United States | 364 U.S. 282 | 1960 |
| Camara v. United States | 364 U.S. 283 | 1960 |
| Cutting v. Bank of Alaska | 364 U.S. 283 | 1960 |
| Deitle v. United States | 364 U.S. 284 | 1960 |
| de Groat v. New York | 364 U.S. 284 | 1960 |
| Cal. Co. v. Colorado | 364 U.S. 285 | 1960 |
| Thomas v. Michigan | 364 U.S. 286 | 1960 |
| Koppers Co. v. Pennsylvania | 364 U.S. 286 | 1960 |
| West v. California | 364 U.S. 287 | 1960 |
| Kahan v. California | 364 U.S. 287 | 1960 |
| Andrews v. City of San Bernardino | 364 U.S. 288 | 1960 |
| Hyam v. Upper Montgomery Joint Authority | 364 U.S. 288 | 1960 |
| Dunscombe v. Sayle | 364 U.S. 289 | 1960 |
| State Tax Comm'n v. Murray Co. of Tex., Inc. | 364 U.S. 289 | 1960 |
| Tenn. Gas Transmission Co. v. Miss. Tax Comm'n | 364 U.S. 290 | 1960 |
| Atlanta Newspapers, Inc. v. Grimes | 364 U.S. 290 | 1960 |
| Ford v. Att'y Gen. | 364 U.S. 291 | 1960 |
| Vaughn v. Ohio | 364 U.S. 291 | 1960 |
| Clinton v. Joshua Hendy Corp. | 364 U.S. 292 | 1960 |
| Cepero v. Puerto Rico | 364 U.S. 292 | 1960 |
| Wachtel v. New York | 364 U.S. 292 | 1960 |
| Rummel v. Musgrave | 364 U.S. 293 | 1960 |
| Piccott v. Florida | 364 U.S. 293 | 1960 |
| Cooper v. Pitchess | 364 U.S. 294 | 1960 |
| Morales v. Galveston | 364 U.S. 294 | 1960 |
| New Mexico v. Colorado | 364 U.S. 296 | 1960 |
| All Am. Airways, Inc. v. United Air Lines, Inc. | 364 U.S. 297 | 1960 |
| School Dist. of Abington Township v. Schempp | 364 U.S. 298 | 1960 |
| Dayton Rubber Co. v. Cordovan Associates, Inc. | 364 U.S. 299 | 1960 |
| Standard Dredging Corp. v. Alabama | 364 U.S. 300 | 1960 |
| United States v. John Hancock Mut. Life Ins. Co. | 364 U.S. 301 | 1960 |
| United States v. Hougham | 364 U.S. 310 | 1960 |
| Michalic v. Clev. Tankers, Inc. | 364 U.S. 325 | 1960 |
| Kelley v. Raggio | 364 U.S. 336 | 1960 |
| Cent. Ill. Pub. Serv. Co. v. Ill. Com. Comm'n | 364 U.S. 336 | 1960 |
| Ohio ex rel. King v. Shannon | 364 U.S. 337 | 1960 |
| Armco Steel Corp. v. Michigan | 364 U.S. 337 | 1960 |
| Riss & Co. v. Dalton | 364 U.S. 338 | 1960 |
| Mason v. Eckle | 364 U.S. 338 | 1960 |
| Gomillion v. Lightfoot | 364 U.S. 339 | 1960 |
| Chaunt v. United States | 364 U.S. 350 | 1960 |
| Knetsch v. United States | 364 U.S. 361 | 1960 |
| McPhaul v. United States | 364 U.S. 372 | 1960 |
| Uphaus v. Wyman | 364 U.S. 388 | 1960 |
| Climate Control, Inc. v. Hill | 364 U.S. 409 | 1960 |
| Bobo v. City of Savannah Beach | 364 U.S. 409 | 1960 |
| Meyer v. United States | 364 U.S. 410 | 1960 |
| Waterman S.S. Corp. v. Dugan & McNamara, Inc. | 364 U.S. 421 | 1960 |
| Polites v. United States | 364 U.S. 426 | 1960 |
| N.Y.N.H. & H.R.R. Co. v. Henagan | 364 U.S. 441 | 1960 |
| Thomas v. Virginia | 364 U.S. 443 | 1960 |
| Ford Motor Co. v. Pace | 364 U.S. 444 | 1960 |
| Dart Drug Corp. v. Gadol | 364 U.S. 444 | 1960 |
| King v. Ellis | 364 U.S. 445 | 1960 |
| Statham v. California | 364 U.S. 445 | 1960 |
| Small Business Adm'n v. McClellan | 364 U.S. 446 | 1960 |
| Boynton v. Virginia | 364 U.S. 454 | 1960 |
| Scott v. California | 364 U.S. 471 | 1960 |
| Kirschke v. Houston | 364 U.S. 474 | 1960 |
| Riela v. New York | 364 U.S. 474 | 1960 |
| Beck v. Binks | 364 U.S. 475 | 1960 |
| Kotrich v. DuPage Cnty. | 364 U.S. 475 | 1960 |
| Griffith v. California | 364 U.S. 476 | 1960 |
| Ray v. Ohio | 364 U.S. 476 | 1960 |
| Bandy v. United States | 364 U.S. 477 | 1960 |
| Pekao Trading Corp. v. Bragalini | 364 U.S. 478 | 1960 |
| Shelton v. Tucker | 364 U.S. 479 | 1960 |
| Bush v. Orleans Parish Sch. Bd. | 364 U.S. 500 | 1960 |
| United States v. Louisiana (1960) (second case) | 364 U.S. 502 | 1960 |
| Davis v. United States (1960) | 364 U.S. 505 | 1960 |
| Krupa v. Farmington River Power Co. | 364 U.S. 506 | 1960 |
| Reina v. United States | 364 U.S. 507 | 1960 |
| Allred v. Heaton | 364 U.S. 517 | 1960 |
| Westinghouse Broadcasting Co. v. United States | 364 U.S. 518 | 1960 |
| Robertoy v. Michigan | 364 U.S. 519 | 1960 |
| United States v. Miss. Valley Generating Co. | 364 U.S. 520 | 1961 |
| NLRB v. Radio Engineers | 364 U.S. 573 | 1961 |
| Callanan v. United States | 364 U.S. 587 | 1961 |
| Lewis v. Mfgs. Nat'l Bank | 364 U.S. 603 | 1961 |
| Carbo v. United States | 364 U.S. 611 | 1961 |
| Denver Chi. Transp. Co. v. United States | 364 U.S. 627 | 1961 |
| Or.-Nev.-Cal. Fast Freight, Inc. v. Stewart | 364 U.S. 627 | 1961 |
| Worthington Corp. v. Mlodozeniec | 364 U.S. 628 | 1961 |
| Lawrence Cnty. v. United States | 364 U.S. 628 | 1961 |
| Sylvander v. Farmers & Traders Life Ins. Co. | 364 U.S. 629 | 1961 |
| Beltowski v. Rigg | 364 U.S. 629 | 1961 |
| Ridgway Nat'l Bank v. Pennsylvania | 364 U.S. 630 | 1961 |
| Travis v. United States | 364 U.S. 631 | 1961 |
| Ry. Employees v. Wright | 364 U.S. 642 | 1961 |
| Radiant Burners, Inc. v. Peoples Gas Light & Coke Co. | 364 U.S. 656 | 1961 |
| Kimbrough v. United States | 364 U.S. 661 | 1961 |
| Peck v. New York | 364 U.S. 662 | 1961 |
