= George Simkins Jr. =

Dentist, community leader, and civil rights activist (1924–2001)

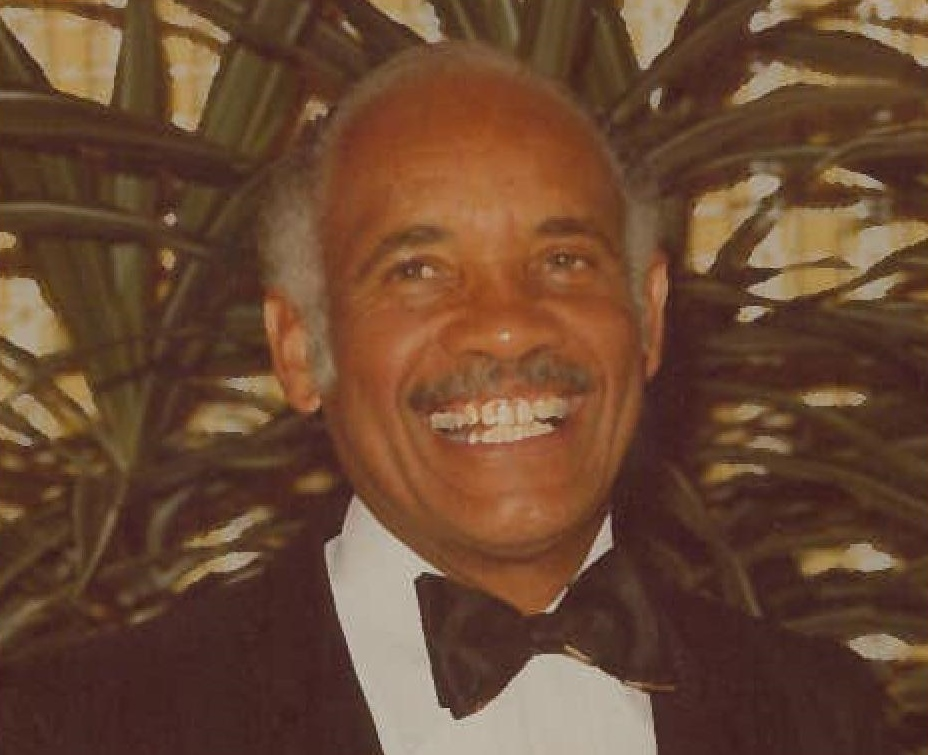
- Born: August 23, 1924
- Occupations: Dentist, Civil Rights Activist

Dr. George Simkins Jr. (August 23, 1924 – November 21, 2001) was a dentist, community leader in Greensboro, North Carolina, and civil rights activist. During the 1950s, he won several significant desegregation lawsuits and was, for a quarter of a century, the president of the Greensboro branch of the National Association for the Advancement of Colored People (NAACP).

Beginning in 1955, Simkins used the courts and local referendums to compel the desegregation of recreational facilities, schools, and hospitals and end discrimination in the delivery of public housing, banking services, and city services.

== Background ==
Simkins was born in Greensboro, North Carolina, on August 23, 1924, the first child of George C. Simkins Sr., a dentist and community leader, and Guyrene Tyson Simkins, an educator. He grew up in sports and was a natural athlete, and was even a nationally ranked badminton player. Simkins attended Dudley High School in Greensboro before matriculating into Herzl Junior College in Chicago, and then Talladega College, from which he graduated. He earned his dentistry degree from Meharry School of Dentistry in 1948 and completed his rotating internship at Jersey City Medical Center. Simkins opened a private dentistry practice upon returning to Greensboro and joined the Guilford County Health Department, becoming the first African American employed there.

== Gillespie Golf Course ==
In 1940, the city of Greensboro constructed a golf course using public funds - 65 percent of which were provided by the federal government – as part of the Works Progress Administration. The course was opened in 1949 by the city of Greensboro as a public facility exclusively for whites. In 1955, Simkins decided to challenge the city council's segregation rule by going to the Gillespie Park course to play. On December 7, 1955, the same week the Montgomery bus boycott was launched in the wake of Rosa Park's defiance of bus segregation, he and five others went to the Gillespie Park course where they presented green fees, but were not given permission to play – they were told the Gillespie Park Golf Course was a private course for members only. Simkins placed seventy-five cents, the green fee for the course, on the counter and proceeded to the course after insisting on his right to play. The manager approached Dr. Simkins and his five companions and demanded they leave, but they refused and continued to play.

That night, Simkins and the five other players were arrested and charged with trespassing. On February 6, 1956, all six men were convicted of simple trespass and fined fifteen dollars and court costs. They appealed to the Superior Court, and were found guilty in December 1956. The trespass charges were finally thrown out by the North Carolina State Supreme Court in June 1957.

In a second trial, which was ordered because the arrest warrants had been altered to call Gillespie a "club" rather than a "course", a list of everyone who played at Gillespie was obtained. Two members of the all-white jury were on the list. The judge imposed a maximum 30-day sentence. Before the appeal to the state Supreme Court, middle district judge Johnson J. Hayes of North Wilkesboro gave the 6 a declaratory judgment, calling the "so-call lease" as a private facility invalid.

"To hold otherwise would open a Pandora's box by which governmental agencies could deprive citizens of their constitutional rights by the artifice of a lease," Hayes wrote in his opinion. Hayes ruled that the plaintiffs were unlawfully denied access to use Gillespie Park and "this was done solely due to the color and race of plaintiffs" and said he intended to open the golf course to all citizens. "The golf club permits white people to play without being members, except it requires the prepayment of green fees", he wrote. "The plaintiffs here paid their fees, were forced off the course by being arrested for trespass. Everybody knows this was done because the plaintiffs were Negroes and for no other reason. This court cannot ignore it." The statement and evidence, however, were left out of the record presented to the state Supreme Court, which denied the criminal appeal. The case, Wolfe v. North Carolina, was presented to the U. S. Supreme Court in 1958, which ruled 5–4 against the Gillespie 6. "Chief Justice Earl Warren and the rest of the justices couldn't understand why something so important was left out of the record", Simkins said. Thurgood Marshall (director –general for the NAACP Legal Defense and Education Fund) said "George, your lawyers ought to be the ones going to jail instead of us the way they screwed the case up." A strong dissenting opinion by Chief Justice Warren prompted North Carolina Governor Luther Hodges to commute the jail sentences of the five surviving plaintiffs.

After the clubhouse was burned two weeks before Judge Hayes' order to integrate the course, the Fire Marshall condemned the entire facility. Greensboro's City Council voted to go out of the recreation business, eventually selling the property on which nine of the holes were built. It took seven years, a campaign to vote in a completely new City Council and the pleading of the entire community, including former pro Ernie Edwards, to get Gillespie reopened. On December 7, 1962, the nine remaining holes at Gillespie welcomed golfers again. Simkins was the first man to tee off.

== Simkins et al. v. Greensboro ==
In October 1956, while the initial trespass case was still active, Dr. Simkins filed suit in the U.S. District Court for the Middle District of North Carolina against the City of Greensboro for racial discrimination in maintaining a public golf course for white citizens only. Simkins et al. v. Greensboro was filed by Dr. Simkins as head of the local chapter of the NAACP, and he was joined by nine others, including the five golfers who had joined him in December 1955. On March 20, 1957, the court ruled in favor of Simkins, stating in the opinion that the city of Greensboro could not escape its legal duties to provide equal privileges to all citizens to enjoy city functions. The case was immediately appealed to the Fourth Circuit Court of Appeals, which affirmed the District Court's ruling and ordered the city to discontinue operating the course on a segregated basis.

== Simkins v. Moses H. Cone Memorial Hospital ==
In the early 1960s, only nine hospitals existed for African Americans in North Carolina, and most were overcrowded and offered inadequate healthcare. According to historian Karen Thomas, "Most hospitals in North Carolina and throughout the South did not accept black patients on an equal basis and did not allow black physicians to admit patients or train as interns." Even though most North Carolina hospitals were privately operated, some accepted state and federal funds and that implicated possible government discrimination. Moses H. Cone Memorial Hospital was one of two Greensboro hospitals that had received state and federal funds via the 1946 Hill-Burton Hospital Survey and Construction Act. After his patient had been denied by the Cone and Long Hospitals, George discovered that the same facilities had been built with federal funding. This fact opened a pathway for a possible legal remedy. Because the hospitals had accepted government funds they were not strictly private, George and other plaintiffs filed their suit on these grounds. In addition, the plaintiffs alleged that Public Health Service Regulations providing separate-but-equal services violated the Fifth and Fourteenth Amendments of the U.S. Constitution. The NAACP assisted the plaintiffs as they gained support behind their petition, and the activist group hired Conrad Pearson, an NAACP attorney from Durham, to file the petition to federal district court. On December 5, 1962, the U.S. District Court of the Fourth Circuit decided in the hospitals' favor. Judge Stanley contended that Moses H. Cone and Wesley Long were both private hospitals, not government entities. Relying on The Civil Rights Cases (1883) reasoning, Judge Stanley opined that the two hospitals had a right to discriminate if they chose to.

Even though the plaintiffs lost, they appealed to the U.S. Court of Appeals, and in November 1963, the court overruled the previous court's decision. The appellate court found that the hospitals had violated the Fifth and Fourteenth Amendments because they were connected to the government through the Hill-Burton funds. In addition, the court found that the two Greensboro hospitals had violated the Constitution. Although the black health facilities were separate from white hospitals they most definitely were not equal.

After their loss, the hospitals filed a petition to the U.S. Supreme Court. Attorney General Robert F. Kennedy filed a brief for Simkins and the other plaintiffs, but the Supreme Court denied the case. According to Karen Kruse Thomas, the Simkins v. Cone (1963) "decision marked the first time that federal courts applied the Equal Protection clause of the Fourteenth Amendment to prohibit racial discrimination by a private entity" (Encyclopedia of N.C., p. 1038). The year after the Simkins decision, Congress passed the Civil Rights Act of 1964, officially prohibiting private discrimination in public places. Heralded by many as a landmark case, Simkins became the Brown v Board of Education decision for hospitals. Between 1963 and 2001, there were over 260 references to Simkins in other legal decisions, more than any other case involving hospital racial discrimination.

== Wachovia Bank Picketing ==
In the spring of 1964, Simkins helped start a movement in Greensboro to gain African-Americans "consideration for non-traditional jobs on basis of ability and for on-the-job training" in order to "afford equal employment opportunity" by organizing picketing of Wachovia Bank for job discrimination. Wachovia maintained that it "hired on the basis of merit", yet employed no African-Americans in any of their Greensboro offices. Picketing began on April 28, 1964, and ended just forty-eight hours later with the hiring of two African-American tellers. In a letter to Wachovia, George noted that Wachovia was able to "find the qualified Negros it had been unable to locate during the last two years" when he had first broached the topic Wachovia's discriminatory practices as head of the Greensboro NAACP.
