= Hill–Burton Act =

1946 US federal law about hospitals

Hospital Survey and Construction Act
- Long title: To amend the Public Health Service Act to authorize grants to the States for surveying their hospitals and public health centers and for planning construction of additional facilities, and to authorize grants to assist in such construction.
- Enacted by: the 79th United States Congress

Citations
- Public law: Pub. L. 79–725
- Statutes at Large: 60 Stat. 1040

Legislative history
- Introduced in the Senate as S. 191 by J. Lister Hill (D–AL) on January 10, 1945; Committee consideration by Education and Labor; Signed into law by President Harry S. Truman on August 13, 1946

The Hospital Survey and Construction Act (Pub. L. 79–725, 60 Stat. 1040, enacted July 13, 1946), commonly known as the Hill–Burton Act, is a U.S. federal law passed in 1946, during the 79th United States Congress. It was sponsored by Senator Harold Burton of Ohio and Senator Lister Hill of Alabama.

== Background ==
“Relatively little hospital construction took place during the Great Depression and World War II, so, by the end of the war, there was a severe shortage of hospital beds in the United States. The Hospital Survey and Construction Act of 1946, commonly referred to as the Hill-Burton Act, provided federal grants to states for the construction of new community hospitals (nonfederal, short-stay hospitals) that would be operated on a nonprofit basis. This legislation required that each state develop and upgrade, annually, a plan for health facility construction based on bed-to-population ratios, which became the basis for the allocation of federal construction grants to the states.”

In 1946, after World War II ended, 3.2 community hospital beds were available per 1,000 civilian population in the United States. The objective of the Hill–Burton Act was to reach 4.5 beds per 1,000 population (Teisberg et al., 1991). The Hill-Burton program assisted in the construction of nearly 40% of the beds in the nation's short-stay general hospitals and was the single greatest factor that increased the U.S. bed supply during the 1950s and 1960s (Haglund and Dowling, 1993). Indeed, the Hill–Burton Act made it possible for even small, remote communities to have their own hospitals (Wolfson and Hopes, 1994). By 1980, the United States had reached its goal of 4.5 community hospital beds per 1,000 civilian population (National Center for Health Statistics [NCHS], 2002) even though the Hill-Burton program ended in 1974.

In November 1945, President Harry S. Truman delivered a special message to Congress in which he outlined a five-part program for improving the health and health care of Americans. The Hospital Survey and Construction Act responded to the first of President Truman's proposals, which called for the construction of hospitals and related health care facilities, and was designed to provide federal grants and guaranteed loans to improve the physical plant of the nation's hospital system. Money was designated to the states to achieve 4.5 beds per 1,000 people. The states allocated the available money to their various municipalities, but the law provided for a rotation mechanism, so that an area that received funding moved to the bottom of the list for further funding.

== Details ==
Facilities that received Hill–Burton funding had to adhere to several requirements:

- They were not allowed to discriminate based on race, color, national origin, or creed, though separate but equal facilities in the same area were allowed. The Fourth Circuit Court of Appeals struck down this provision in Simkins v. Cone within its jurisdiction, and the provision was eliminated nationally by Title VI of the Civil Rights Act of 1964.
- Facilities that received funding were also required to provide a "reasonable volume" of free care each year for those residents in the facility's area who needed care but could not afford to pay. Hospitals were initially required to provide uncompensated care for 20 years after receiving funding. The federal money was also only provided in cases where the state and local municipality were willing and able to match the federal grant or loan, so that the federal portion only accounted for one third of the total construction or renovation cost.
- The states and localities were also required to prove the economic viability of the facility in question. This excluded the poorest municipalities from the Hill–Burton program; the majority of funding went to middle class areas. It also served to prop up hospitals that were economically nonviable, retarding the development wrought by market forces. Once Medicare and Medicaid were enacted, participation in those programs was added to the list of requirements for access to Hill–Burton funding.

== Unintended consequences and reconciliation ==
Retrospectively, the Hill–Burton Act had “unintended and undesirable" consequences. President Harry Truman took advantage of reports that the United States had severe capacity deficits in the hospital sector and that many Americans across the country were unable to access acute care services, using them as a stepping stone to create the Hill-Burton Act. In 1965, President Lyndon Johnson dreamed of a “great society” to push his Medicare and Medicaid agenda through Congress. Both the Truman- and Johnson-advocated programs were passed through political compromises. Over time, however, overbuilding of hospitals and unrestrained use of Medicare and Medicaid funding sent health care costs into an uncontrolled upward spiral. Paradoxically, just when the nation achieved its goal of 4.5 community hospital beds per 1,000 population in 1980, as envisioned under the Hill–Burton Act program, the government concluded that the Medicare and Medicaid programs were no longer sustainable due to the rapid rise in health care costs. Subsequently, President Ronald Reagan authorized the prospective payment system (PPS) method of payment to reduce hospital utilization, which started a downward trend in inpatient stays and created a glut of unoccupied hospital beds in many parts of the United States.”

The reality, however, did not nearly meet the written requirement of the law. For the first 20 years of the act's existence, there was no regulation in place to define what constituted a "reasonable volume" or to ensure that hospitals were providing any free care at all. This did not improve until the early 1970s, when lawyers representing poor people began suing hospitals for not abiding by the law. Hill-Burton was set to expire in June 1973, but it was extended for one year in the last hour. In 1975, the Act was amended and became Title XVI of the Public Health Service Act. The most significant changes at this point were the addition of some regulatory mechanisms (defining what constitutes the inability to pay) and the move from a 20-year commitment to a requirement to provide free care in perpetuity. Still, it was not until 1979 that compliance levels were defined.
