= Simkins v. City of Greensboro =

1957 American legal case

- Court: United States Court of Appeals for the Fourth Circuit
- Full case name: City of Greensboro and the Gillespie Park Golf Club, Incorporated v. George Simkins, Jr., Phillip W. Cook, Leonidas Wolf, Samuel Murray, Arthur Lee, Jr., Lonnie Reynolds, William Holmes, Elijah Herring, Joseph Studivent and James G. Hagins
- Argued: June 14, 1957
- Decided: June 28, 1957
- Citation: 246 F.2d 425

Court membership
- Judges sitting: John J. Parker, Simon Sobeloff, Clement Haynsworth

Case opinions
- Per curiam

Simkins v. City of Greensboro, 246 F.2d 425 (4th Cir. 1957), was a 1957 case which required the City of Greensboro, North Carolina to stop discriminating on the basis of race at its Gillespie Park Golf Club, even though it was leasing the club to a private organization. The Fourth Circuit Court of Appeals affirmed the decision.

== Background ==
In December 1955, six African-American men (Leon Wolfe, George Simkins, Jr., Philip Cook, Sam Murray, Elijah Herring, and Joseph Sturdivant) went to the Gillespie Golf Course in Greensboro, North Carolina, which had been built with public funds. The six paid greens fees and began to play despite being told they would not be allowed to. That night, the six were charged with trespassing, and convicted on that charge in February 1956, a conviction which was set aside by the North Carolina Supreme Court in June of the following year.

While that case, Wolfe v. North Carolina, was on-going, Simkins, who had been one of the six, filed the present case in Federal District Court and obtained an injunction in March 1957 against the golf course preventing them from operating the course on a discriminatory basis. That ruling was appealed to the Fourth Circuit.

== Decision of the 4th Circuit ==
In a per curiam ruling, the Court found that the injunction had been granted properly, and that, while, the city could sell the property in a bona fide sale, it could not simply avoid the prohibition on discrimination through leasing the property. saying, "the right of citizens to use public property without discrimination on the ground of race may not be abridged by the mere leasing of the property." Some commentators consider this the case that overturned Plessy v. Ferguson, as Brown's decision was limited to public schools.

== Subsequent developments ==
Rather than desegregating its golf courses, the city sold them.

The trespassing charges that had begun this story were later retried, and all six men were found guilty, as records of this trial and injunction were withheld in that case. The sentences of the six men were later commuted.
