= Wolfe v. North Carolina =

Wolfe et al v. North Carolina
- Supreme Court of the United States

Argued October 19–20, 1959 Decided June 27, 1960
- Full case name: Wolfe et al v. North Carolina
- Citations: 364 U.S. 177 (more) 80 S. Ct. 1482; 4 L. Ed. 2d 1650; 1960 U.S. LEXIS 765

Court membership
- Chief Justice Earl Warren Associate Justices Hugo Black · Felix Frankfurter; William O. Douglas · Tom C. Clark; John M. Harlan II · William J. Brennan Jr. Charles E. Whittaker · Potter Stewart

Case opinions
- Majority: Frankfurter, joined by Clark, Harlan, Whittaker, Stewart
- Dissent: Warren, joined by Black, Douglas, Brennan

Wolfe v. North Carolina, 364 U.S. 177 (1960), is a 1960 United States Supreme Court case in which the court, in a 5–4 decision, upheld the trespassing conviction of six African-American men who were barred from a golf course because of their race.

== Background ==
In December 1955, six African-American men (Leon Wolfe, George Simkins, Jr., Philip Cook, Sam Murray, Elijah Herring, and Joseph Sturdivant) went to the Gillespie Golf Course in Greensboro, North Carolina, which had been built with public funds. The six paid greens fees and began to play despite being told they would not be allowed to. That night, the six were charged with trespassing, and convicted on that charge in February 1956, a conviction which was set aside by the North Carolina Supreme Court in June of the following year. A retrial convicted the six again in 1958.

In the meantime, Simkins, who had been one of the six, filed suit in Federal District Court (Simkins v. City of Greensboro) and obtained an injunction in March 1957 against the golf course preventing them from operating the course through a private contractor on a discriminatory basis. That injunction was upheld on appeal to the Fourth Circuit.

The second conviction was appealed to the North Carolina Supreme Court, who upheld it, and was then appealed (the present case) to the United States Supreme Court.

== Opinion of the Court ==
Stewart authored the opinion of the Court, which found no evidence in the record that the exclusion of the six from the golf course had been discriminatory, the record which reached the Court had not included the record of the federal trial and injunction. Finding that the North Carolina Supreme Court had consistently avoided any investigations of its own regarding the accuracy of a trial record, the Court held that North Carolina had not acted improperly when it had refused to look into the accuracy of the record in this case. As a result, the majority found that there was not a federal question.

The dissent, penned by Chief Justice Warren, said that the record showed that the appellants had in fact offered proof of the federal injunction and trial into the record, and that the case should have been, as a result remanded or decided on the merits.

== Subsequent developments ==
In July 1964 the Civil Rights Act of 1964 was passed, which outlawed discrimination based on race, color, religion, sex or national origin in public accommodations.
