= Smoking in Finland =

Percentages of smoking adult population in Finland, Norway, USA, Japan and the Netherlands in 2011

In Finland, the smoking figures are among the lowest in Europe. There are several factors that have influenced the decrease in the smoking prevalence, such as legislative actions, health promotion and national monitoring systems, policies aimed at reducing tobacco consumption through public awareness campaigns, advertising bans and increased tobacco taxation. Ministry of Social Affairs and Health has the leading role in tobacco control in Finland, and one of their main aims is have a more effective ban on sale of tobacco products to children and young people and to prevent sale of illegal tobacco products. Among the key elements in the successful tobacco policy is the traditional collaboration between the health authorities and non-governmental organisations, and intensive health promotion.

The smoking rate among adults in Finland in 2009 stood at 18.6%, lower than the OECD average of 22.3%. In a more recent study conducted in 2020, the smoking rates were 12% for men and 9.3% for women.

Despite the decreasing trend the health effects of tobacco smoking are considerable and smoking can still be considered as a public health issue since it is still a significant cause of avoidable premature death and illness.

== Legislation ==
The sale of tobacco to children under 18 is prohibited in Finland. Advertising of tobacco and strong alcohol is also prohibited. Smoking in Finland was first restricted in 1976 with a ban on tobacco advertising. In 1995 smoking became prohibited at workplaces, and in 1999, restrictions were imposed on smoking in restaurants. The reform of the Tobacco Act in June 2006 bans smoking in pubs and restaurants, and the most recent amendment to the Act in 2010 states that the retail trade in tobacco products are a subject to a license. A smoking ban for some public places is already enacted, and extends to outdoor concerts and immediate areas around schools and day-care centres, and many Finnish landlords insist on non-smoking rental agreements. The Government of Finland aims to reduce smoking to five percent or less of the population by 2030.

== Taxation ==
The state collected €655 million in tax revenue from tobacco taxation in 2010. Tax is collected from various tobacco products, but the vast majority of tax revenue comes from cigarettes. Taxation has a major effect on the cost of cigarettes, and tobacco products are ranked 10th most expensive among the EU27 countries. Tobacco taxation policy and price level in one Member State also affect tobacco consumption in other Member States. This is particularly apparent in Finland where the price of a Marlboro cigarette packet on 2005 was €4 but only €1.60 in Estonia, which is accessible by a two-hour boat drive and has a heavy tourist traffic from Finland.

== Smoking cessation initiatives ==
Nicotine replacement therapy products are widely available in pharmacies and grocery stores, however they are relatively pricy which may not motivate smokers to quit. In addition to aid smoking cessation there are support networks, free of charge telephone quitline and several internet websites for smokers trying to quit.

Finnish municipalities such as Nokia, Ylöjärvi and Espoo have banned smoking at their campuses, and some companies have offered cash bonuses of up to €1,000 euro to employees who quit smoking.

== Snus ==
Aside from cigarettes, another common tobacco product used in Finland, Sweden and Norway is snus, which is made from pasteurised tobacco. It is consumed by placing it under the lip for extended periods of time. The European Union banned the sale of snus in 1992, after a 1985 WHO study concluded that "oral use of snuffs of the types used in North America and western Europe is carcinogenic to humans". A WHO committee on tobacco has also acknowledged that evidence is inconclusive regarding health consequences for snus consumers. Only Sweden and EFTA-member Norway are exempt from this ban. A popular movement during the run-up to the 1994 referendum for Sweden's EU membership made exemption from the EU sale ban of snus a condition of the membership treaty. Finnish people purchase snus commonly from cruise ships that have a regular traffic between Finland and Sweden.

== See also ==
- Secondhand smoke
- European Tobacco Products Directive
- Health in Finland
