= Cone Health Women's Hospital =

Coordinates: 36.09300°N 79.81784°W

Women's Hospital
- Cone Health

Geography
- Location: 801 Green Valley Road, Greensboro, North Carolina, United States

Services
- Beds: 134

History
- Opened: 1977
- Closed: 2021
- Demolished: 2022

Links
- Lists: Hospitals in North Carolina

Women's Hospital of Greensboro was a 134-bed maternity and women's care hospital in Greensboro, North Carolina, United States It was North Carolina's first free-standing hospital dedicated to women and newborns. The hospital opened in 1977 and closed in 2020. Its building was demolished in 2022.

== History ==
In 1977, Humana opened Greensboro Hospital on 801 Green Valley Road in Greensboro, North Carolina. It was the city's first for-profit hospital. Charles Kuralt was the keynote speaker for the hospital's dedication. The hospital's name changed to Humana Health-Greensboro in 1982, when thirty more beds were added. At the time, Humana opened its MedFirst clinics, which resulted in several doctors leaving in protest. Occupancy declined to the point that the top floor was closed.

In 1985, a women's health unit opened but did not include obstetrics. Moses H. Cone Memorial Hospital took over in 1988 and returned the Greensboro Hospital name. After renovation, the hospital became Women's Hospital of Greensboro in 1990, the state's first free-standing hospital dedicated to women and newborns. This maternity and women's care hospital had 134 beds.

After the birth of over 150,000 babies, the hospital closed on February 23, 2020. All of its services moved to the Cone Health Women's & Children's Center at Moses H. Cone Memorial Hospital.

The hospital facility was reopened in April 2020, serving only COVID-19 patients, with a capacity of 116 beds. On March 3, 2021, the hospital discharged its last patient after serving 4,700 patients in all.

In a deal announced September 1, 2021, Cone Health traded the property to Deep River Partners in exchange for a lot on Green Valley Road in Greensboro near where Cone Health had another facility. The pandemic had delayed Deep River's plans. In January 2022, the former hospital building was torn down.
