= Knetsch v. United States =

- Supreme Court of the United States

Argued October 17–18, 1960 Decided November 14, 1960
- Full case name: Knetsch v. United States
- Citations: 364 U.S. 361 (more) 81 S. Ct. 132; 5 L. Ed. 2d 128; 1960 U.S. LEXIS 1980; 60-2 U.S. Tax Cas. (CCH) ¶ 9785; 6 A.F.T.R.2d (RIA) 5851; 1961-1 C.B. 34

Holding
- The amounts paid as "interest" in 1953 and 1954 were not deductible from the gross income of the taxpayer and his wife in their joint income tax returns for those years as "interest paid … on indebtedness," within the meaning of 23 (b) of the IRC of 1939 and 163 (a) of the IRC of 1954.

Court membership
- Chief Justice Earl Warren Associate Justices Hugo Black · Felix Frankfurter; William O. Douglas · Tom C. Clark; John M. Harlan II · William J. Brennan Jr. Charles E. Whittaker · Potter Stewart

Case opinions
- Majority: Brennan, joined by Warren, Black, Frankfurter, Clark, Harlan
- Dissent: Douglas, joined by Whittaker, Stewart

Laws applied
- Internal Revenue Code

Knetsch v. United States, 364 U.S. 361 (1960), was a decision by the United States Supreme Court concerning taxation law.

The taxpayer was a saver who was convinced to buy a deferred annuity because the inside buildup on such policies is tax-deferred. However, he wanted to claim a deduction on the money he borrowed that he used to buy the annuity. The IRS won and the taxpayer was denied the deduction. An understanding of the economics would immediately reveal that the only reason the transaction had any chance of making sense for the taxpayer was the asymmetric way the-then current tax code allowed a current deduction on the loan liability at the same time allowed tax deferral on the purchased asset. Success would have legitimated tax arbitrage.

== See also ==
- List of United States Supreme Court cases, volume 364
