= Moses H. Cone Memorial Hospital =

The Moses H. Cone Memorial Hospital
- Cone Health

Geography
- Location: Greensboro, North Carolina, United States
- Coordinates: 36.0922°N 79.7856°W

Organization
- Care system: Private
- Type: Teaching
- Network: Cone Health

Services
- Emergency department: Level II trauma center
- Beds: 517

History
- Opened: 1953

Links
- Website: www.conehealth.com/moses-cone-hospital
- Lists: Hospitals in the United States
- Other links: List of hospitals in North Carolina

The Moses H. Cone Memorial Hospital, also known as Moses Cone Hospital, is a 517-bed tertiary care facility located in Greensboro, North Carolina. The hospital opened in 1953 on North Elm Street as a 310-bed community hospital. Moses Cone Hospital is the central facility of Cone Health, a network of medical care facilities serving Guilford County and surrounding areas. As of 2023, Preston Hammock serves as regional president for the Greensboro market which includes Moses Cone Hospital.

Moses Cone Hospital is the largest hospital in its four county region (Alamance, Guilford, Randolph, and Rockingham counties). The hospital is a designated Level II Trauma Center.

== History ==
Funding for a hospital began after the 1908 death of Moses H. Cone, a North Carolina magnate who founded the Cone Mills textile company. In 1911, Bertha Cone, the widow of Moses, established a trust fund that would establish a hospital to serve Greensboro and memorialize her late husband. The trust fund stated that "No patient should be refused admittance because of inability to pay.". After Bertha Cone's death in 1947, her inheritance went to the trust fund that would eventually establish the hospital. Construction began in 1949 and the facility opened on February 20, 1953.

Cone was a segregated, whites-only hospital until 1963, when the Fourth Circuit Court of Appeals, in Simkins v. Moses H. Cone Memorial Hospital, held the hospital's acceptance of federal funds prohibited it from discriminating on the basis of race, an opinion influenced Title VI of the Civil Rights Act of 1964.

In the late 1970s, a dispute over payments after the completion of a new wing eventually reached the U.S. Supreme Court. By a 6–3 margin, the justices required the hospital to arbitrate with its contractor. The case, Moses H. Cone Memorial Hospital v. Mercury Constr. Corp., set some precedents in civil procedure, clarifying the circumstances under which a federal court can decline jurisdiction when there is a similar case in state court and when a stay may be appealed as a final judgement.

In 2013, Cone Health opened a new patient tower referred to as North Tower. A new entrance off Church Street opened on February 1, 2014.

On February 23, 2020, maternity services moved to the campus of Moses Cone Hospital from Women's Hospital. The new Women's & Children's Center at Moses Cone Hospital will provide maternity services, a neonatal intensive care unit and obstetrics speciality care. The center includes its own entrance off Northwood Street with 24-hour valet service and its own parking deck.

In 2022, Cone Health announced the expansion of Heart & Vascular care on the Moses Cone Hospital campus. The project includes a 156,000 sq. ft., five-story heart and vascular outpatient tower as well as 37,000 sq. ft. of renovated space inside the hospital for coordinated care.

On December 1, 2024 Cone Health was purchased by Risant Health. Risant Health is a nonprofit organization backed by Kaiser Permanente.
