= Oulu University Hospital =

- Northern Ostrobothnia Hospital District
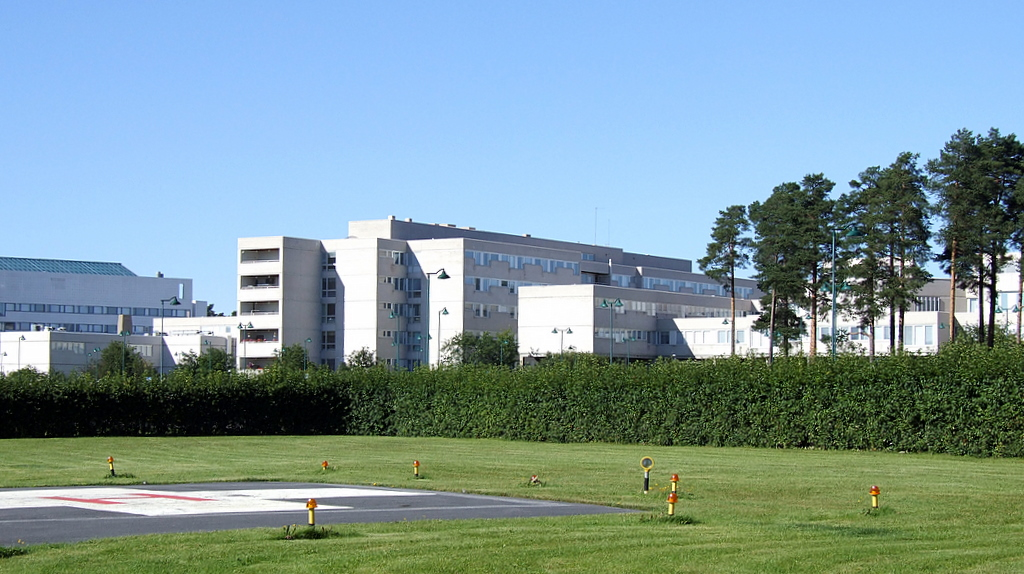
- Hospital buildings

Geography
- Location: Kontinkangas, Oulu, FI
- Coordinates: 65°00′27″N 025°31′07″E

Organisation
- Type: Teaching
- Affiliated university: University of Oulu

Services
- Beds: ca. 900

Helipads
- Helipad: ICAO: EFHO

History
- Founded: 1973

Links
- Website: oys.fi

Oulu University Hospital (OUH, Finnish: Oulun yliopistollinen sairaala, OYS) is a university hospital in Oulu, Finland. It is the northernmost of the five university hospitals in Finland.

The Oulu University Hospital is affiliated with the University of Oulu, and it is used as a teaching hospital by the Faculty of Medicine. The hospital was established in 1973. In 1963–1972 the teaching hospital of the university was the Oulu provincial hospital. The hospital serves as the central hospital for Northern Ostrobothnia region. It was previously named as Oulu University Central Hospital (Finnish: Oulun yliopistollinen keskussairaala, OYKS).

The hospital is owned and operated by the Northern Ostrobothnia Hospital District (Finnish: Pohjois-Pohjanmaan sairaanhoitopiiri) which is a joint municipal authority responsible for production of specialized medical services in the region. It also owns and operates two other hospitals: Oulaskangas Hospital in Oulainen and Visala Hospital in Ylivieska. At the turn of the 1990s, the Oulunsuu hospital and Heikinharju hospital were attached to the Northern Ostrobothnia Hospital District and they became OYS Psychiatry.

== History ==
Before the establishment of the university hospital most of the medical services in Oulu were based in the old provincial hospital, but with new laws being put in place in the 1950s and the university opening with its medical teaching, it was decided to build a new university hospital. The ministry of the interior held a competition for Finnish architects in 1965 and it was won by Reino Koivula. The president of Finland at the time, Urho Kekkonen laid the cornerstone in December 1968 and the facility was inaugurated on September 3, 1976. In 2018 the Ministry of Social Affairs and Health granted a permission for the project to build an entire new hospital on the place of the old one due to it no longer meeting the standards of modern healthcare and its bad condition.

== Future hospital 2030 project ==
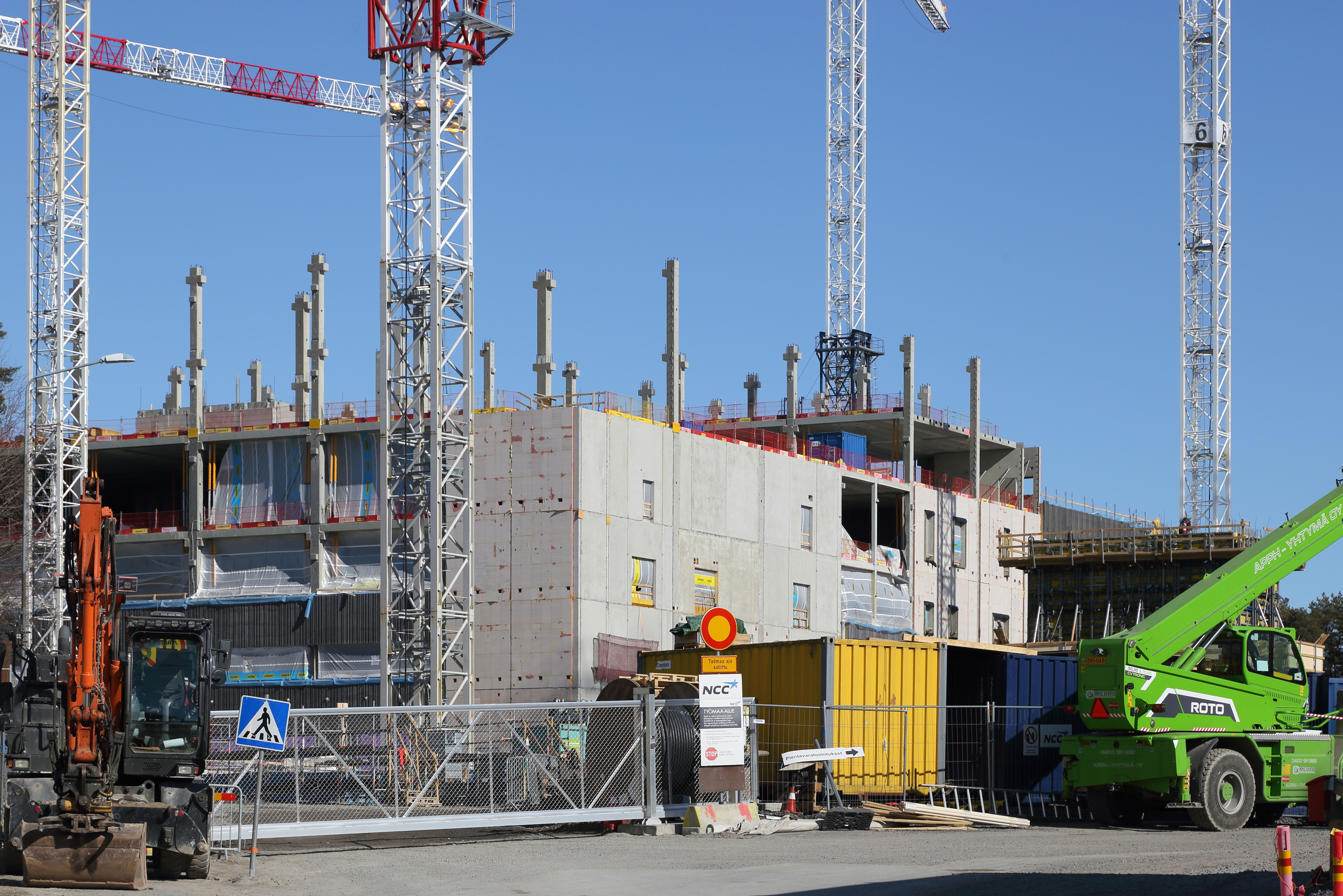
The first section under construction

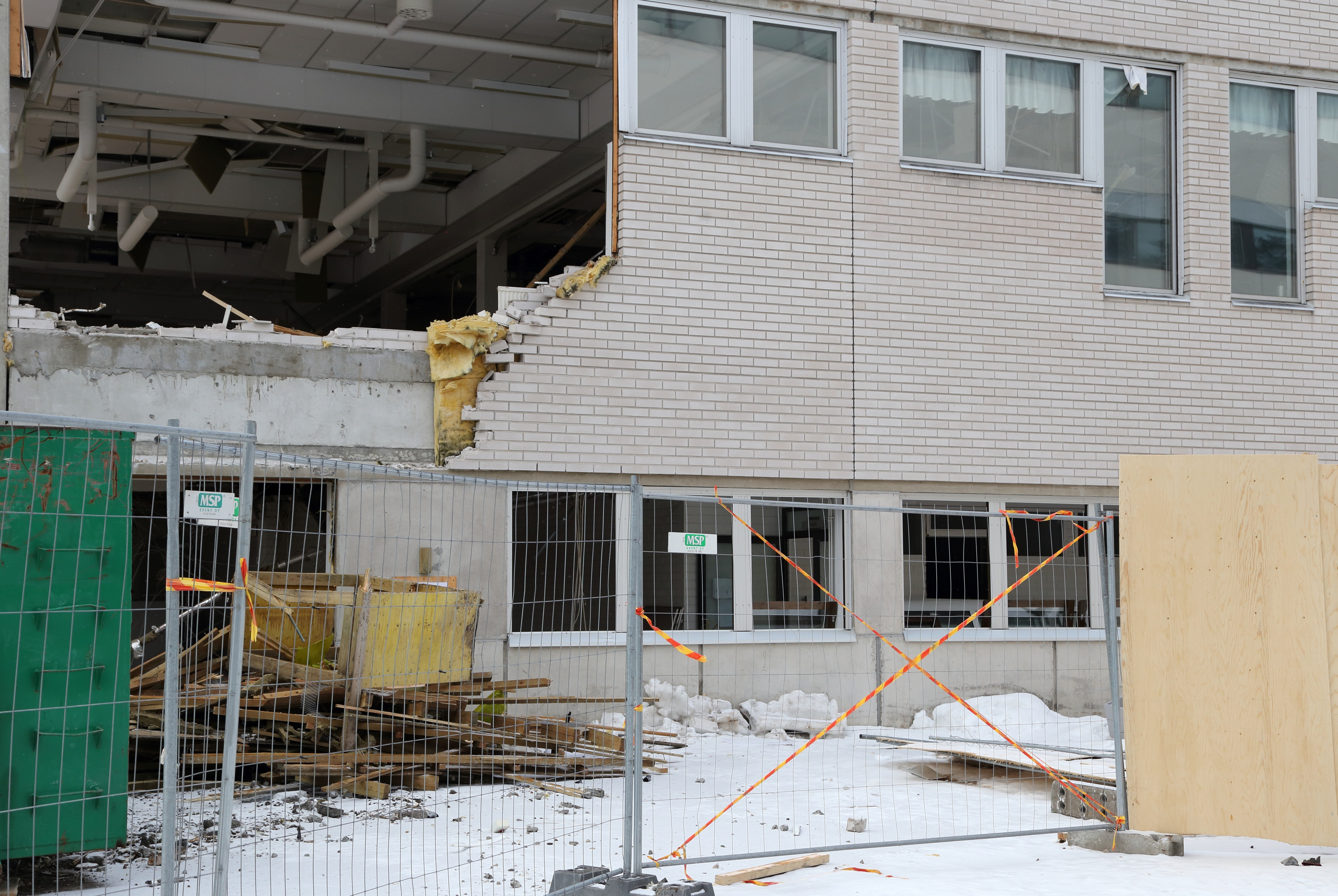
Wall being torn down from the old building

The current hospital buildings are being demolished and rebuilt in sections in a way that the hospital can stay operational during the whole project. The first section is estimated to be ready in 2023 and the massive project is to be fully completed in 2030 with a total cost of up to a billion euroes. The new hospital will utilise the latest advanced technology, information systems and renewable energy and its goal is to improve the healthcare services as well as the workplace of its 6,800 employees.
