= Western Uusimaa Wellbeing Services County =

Regional democratic unit in Finland

The location of Western Uusimaa Wellbeing Services County in Finland.

Western Uusimaa Wellbeing Services County (abbreviation: LUVN; Finnish: Länsi-Uudenmaan hyvinvointialue; Swedish: Västra Nylands välfärdsområde) is one of Finland’s 21 Wellbeing Services Counties. Established as part of a major national reform in 2023, these counties assumed responsibility for organising health, social, and rescue services, transferring these duties from individual municipalities to regional authorities. The aim of the reform was to improve the availability, quality, and efficiency of public services, address demographic challenges, and ensure equal access to care across the country.

== Municipalities ==
LUVN encompasses the following Finnish municipalities:

- Espoo
- Hanko
- Ingå
- Karkkila
- Kauniainen
- Kirkkonummi
- Lohja
- Raseborg
- Siuntio
- Vihti

In the beginning of 2022 the municipalities had together 480 675 inhabitants.

== Services ==
LUVN is responsible for providing health, social, and rescue services-including school psychologists and social workers. While the reform has centralised service organisation at the regional level, municipal authorities continue to promote wellbeing and health through areas such as education and culture.

=== Healthcare ===
There are four hospitals in Western Uusimaa Wellbeing Services County:

- Espoo Hospital
- Jorvi Hospital
- Lohja Hospital
- Raseborg Hospital

=== Rescue Services ===
Western Uusimaa Rescue Services (Finnish: Länsi-Uudenmaan pelastuslaitos, Swedish: Västra Nylands räddningsverk) operates within the county. Around 600 people work for the rescue services and there are 12 rescue and fire stations in Western Uusimaa. Additionally there are around 1000 voluntary firefighters in 40 voluntary fire departments. Hanko and Tenala have part time hired rescue workers.

== Decision-making ==
The county operates as a self-governing public body, funded by central government grants, and is governed by a democratically elected county council. The first elections, where 70 representatives were elected, was organised on 23 January 2022.
