= Healthcare in Finland =

Healthcare in Finland consists of a highly decentralized three-level publicly funded healthcare system and a much smaller private sector. Although the Ministry of Social Affairs and Health has the highest decision-making authority, specific healthcare precincts are responsible for providing healthcare to their residents as of 2023.

Finland offers its residents universal health care. The prevention of diseases and other types of health promotion have been the main focus of Finnish healthcare policies for decades.

The quality of service in Finnish healthcare is considered to be good; according to a survey published by the European Commission in 2000, Finland belongs to the top five countries in satisfaction: 88% of Finnish respondents were satisfied, compared with the EU average of 71%.

== History ==
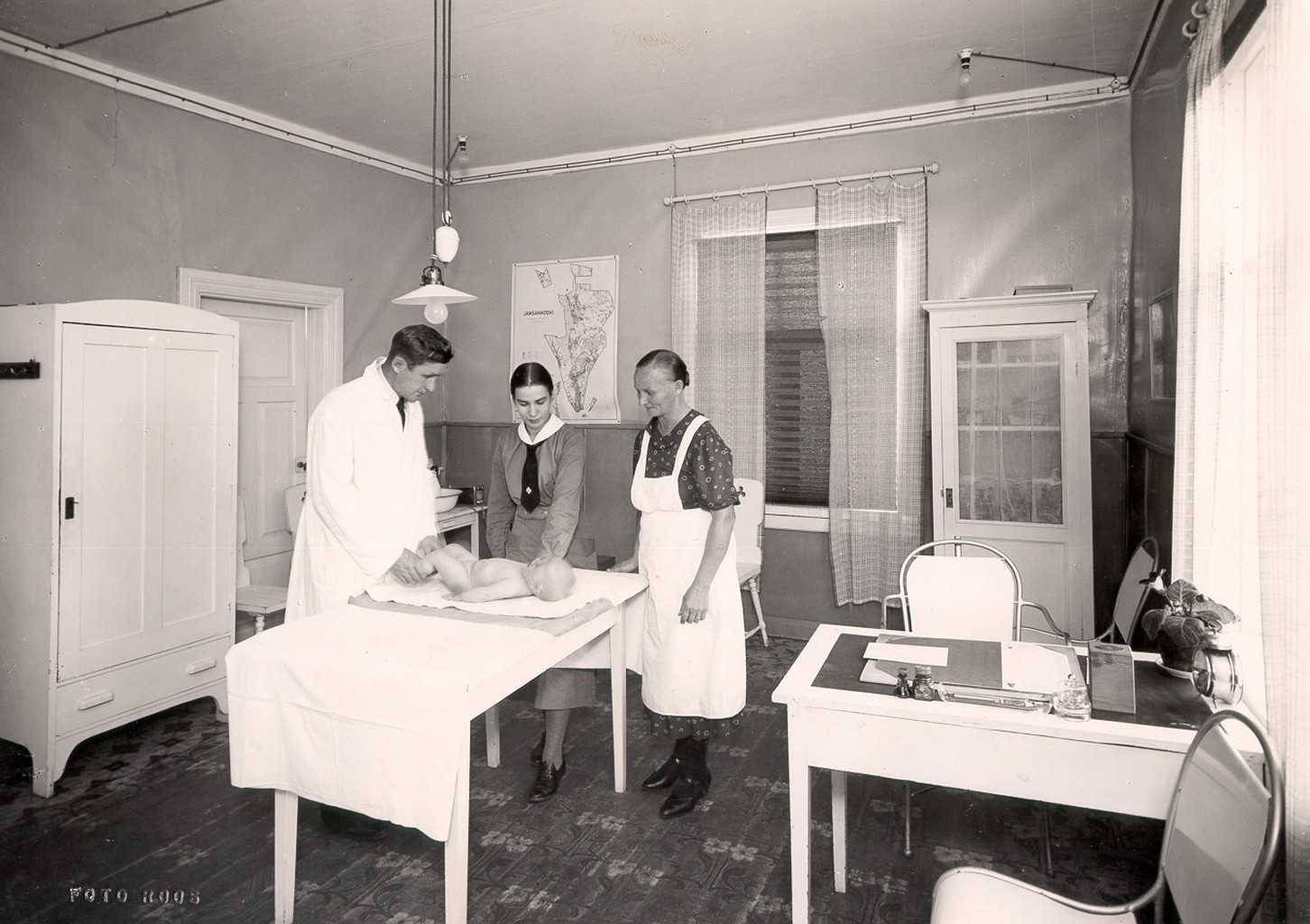
A child welfare clinic in 1938

Finland's journey to a welfare state has been long, from a very modest start. The history of modern medicine in Finland can be considered to have begun in 1640 when the first university of Finland, The Royal Academy of Turku, was established. At the time Finland was a part of the Swedish Empire. As the field of medicine did not enjoy very high status in society at the time, the importance of trained medical faculty remained low for a long time. Until 1750, the professor of medicine was the only trained medical doctor in Finland.

An example of early treatment facilities for tuberculosis and leprosy was a hospital on the island of Själö (or Seili in Finnish) which was established on the 1624 and run by the church. It was chosen due to its remote location from the mainland. It was not however until 1759 that the first hospital, albeit a modest hospital, was established in Turku. Consisting of six patient beds in a simple wooden building, it nonetheless marked the first step toward the modern Finnish medical system. It is noteworthy that at the time, Finland had a much lower doctor-patient ratio comparing to neighboring countries. This lasted all the way until the 20th century.

Mainly due to the poor hygiene, famine, and poverty, the most common causes of death in the mid-19th century consisted of infectious diseases such as tuberculosis, dysentery and typhoid fever.

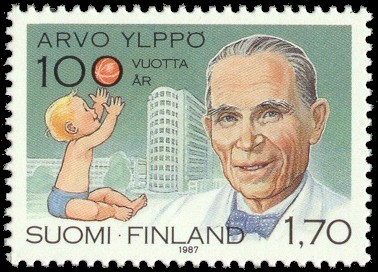
Arvo Ylppö portrayed on a postage stamp published in 1987.

While the number of hospitals increased rapidly from the late 19th century onward, it was still uncommon to be treated in one. The largest causes of mortality were coronary heart diseases for men and breast cancer for women. In 1929, a special committee was established to evaluate the status of health care in Finland. Due to the lack of service providers outside cities, it was suggested that municipalities establish local hospitals for their citizens. The decision to establish publicly funded hospitals can be considered the base of the current model of modern health care in Finland.

The plans to reform the healthcare system were delayed due to the Second World War, but the increased need of medical care due to injuries to the soldiers may have enhanced the development of the hospital network. In the 1950s, Finland had two university hospitals, in Helsinki and Turku. Due to the increased demand of medical care and lack of medical doctors, more medical faculties and university hospitals were established.

During the 20th century, a notable contribution to the reduction of infant mortality was achieved by Arvo Ylppö. He conducted research about children's pathological anatomy and attracted international recognition for his work. He has also contributed to the development of nursing education, pharmacy industry and public awareness over health issues.

A major change in the public healthcare system is planned for 2023. On 23 January 2022, county elections will be held. In these elections the members and deputy members of 22 newly formed "wellbeing services county councils" will be chosen. These councils are planned to take over the previous work from the municipalities, to organize the healthcare and welfare related services in their respective areas.

== Health status ==
=== Healthcare indicators ===
Historical development of life expectancy in Finland

Finnish healthcare can be considered a success because of several indicators. For example, due to public health interventions and progress in medical care, there has been a remarkable improvement in life expectancy over the past couple of decades. Life expectancy in 2012 was 84 years for women and 78 years for men, which has ranked Finland favorably against global comparisons. Impressive results have also been achieved regarding rates of Infant mortality and maternal mortality, which are also amongst the lowest in the world. The infant mortality rate in Finland, as in other OECD countries, has fallen greatly over the past few decades. The rate in 2013 was 1.8 per 1000 births.

In 2009, Finland had 2.7 practicing physicians for every 1000 people, which is very low compared to the other Nordic countries. This can partly be explained by the importance placed on the use of nurses, who greatly reduce the need for practicing physicians. An example being in 2009 where there were 9.6 nurses per 1000 people, a larger amount than those in the comparable Nordic nations.

Finland is considered successful particularly in regards to specialized medical care and the coverage of its screening and vaccination programs. Finland has a very comprehensive screening program for breast cancer where 84% of women, aged 50 to 69 years, annually take part. The vaccination program for young children has a 99% vaccination rate of children under 2 years of age for whooping cough (pertussis) and measles.

Lower fertility rates and an aging population, due to increased life-expectancy, brings new challenges to the Finnish health care system. As there will be fewer people to pay for health and social care, many of the aging population can be predicted to be affected. It is estimated that the old age dependency ratio in Finland will be the highest of all EU countries in 2025.

According to the Euro health consumer index, which placed it in fourth position in its 2015 survey, Finland is a leader in value-for-money healthcare.

== Organizational structure ==
The Government decides on general national strategies and priorities and proposes bills to be discussed by the parliament. Health care policy is primarily the field of Ministry of Social Affairs and Health. The Ministry also directs and guides the development and policies of social protection, social welfare and health care. Due to the decentralized public administration, municipalities decide themselves how the local services are provided. Every municipality has a responsibility to offer health care services to their residents and it is usually provided in municipal health care centers and/or municipal hospitals. In addition to municipal health care services, employers must offer occupational healthcare services to their workers. This means that employed persons can usually choose one of two routes to use to access general doctor services. The municipal (public) service or the occupational (private) service. Employers contact with private medical groups for occupational health services. The degree of specialist access and cost depends on the contacted service level the employer provides, but service is usually free to the patient. Private hospital groups offer primary and secondary care services, but they may also refer patients to the university hospitals or to community hospitals run by the local municipality for specialist care/treatment. Some part of the costs incurred in the use of private medical providers can be reclaimed from the government social insurance institution KELA but this is never 100%.

The access to hospital care is subject to a request from a general practitioner.

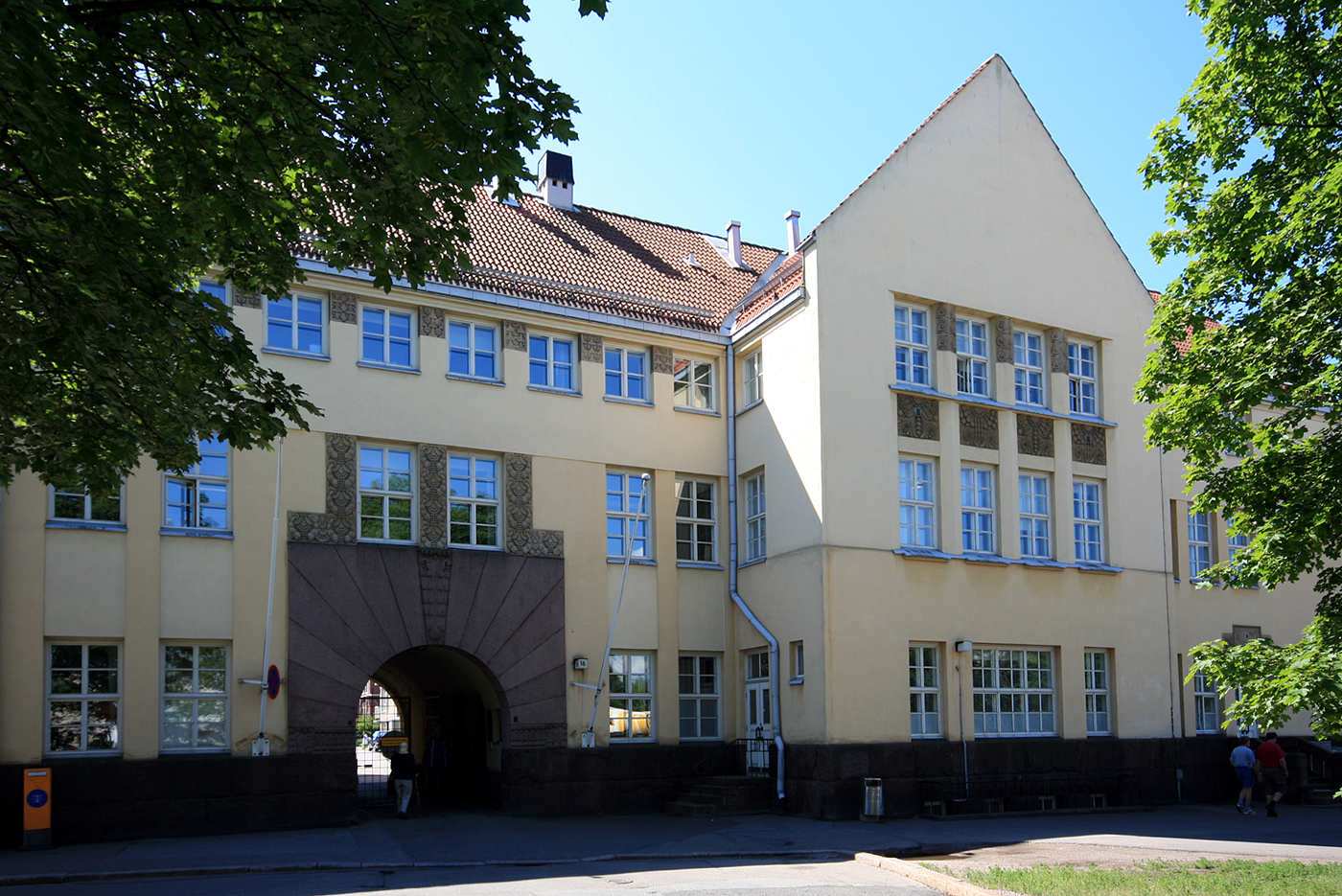
Maria Hospital, Helsinki

Primary care is obtained from the health care centers employing general practitioners and nurses that provide most day-to-day medical services. Health centers are also active in health promotion activities. The general practitioners are also gatekeepers to the more specialized services in the secondary and tertiary care sectors, as a referral from primary care provider is necessary to receive care on the secondary and tertiary levels. Primary health services provided by municipalities are defined in the Primary Health Care Act.

For secondary care, Finland is geographically divided into 21 hospital districts (Finnish: sairaanhoitopiiri, Swedish: sjukvårdsdistrikt; literally "healthcare district"). Each district provides more specialised care for the municipalities within its region. Finland also has a network of five university teaching hospitals which makes up the tertiary level. These contain the most advanced medical equipment and facilities in the country. These are funded by the municipalities, but national government meets the cost of medical training. These hospitals are located in the major cities of Helsinki, Turku, Tampere, Kuopio, and Oulu. All these five cities have a medical faculty.

=== Health institutions ===
The Finnish Institute for Health and Welfare (THL, Finnish: Terveyden ja hyvinvoinnin laitos) is a research and development institute that functions as a statutory statistical expert authority for health and welfare in Finland. THL functions in health and welfare promotion, in prevention of disease and social problems, e.g. ensuring vaccine supplies and monitoring their quality, and in development of social and health services. It is publicly funded organization under the Finnish Ministry of Social Affairs and Health.

== Health financing ==
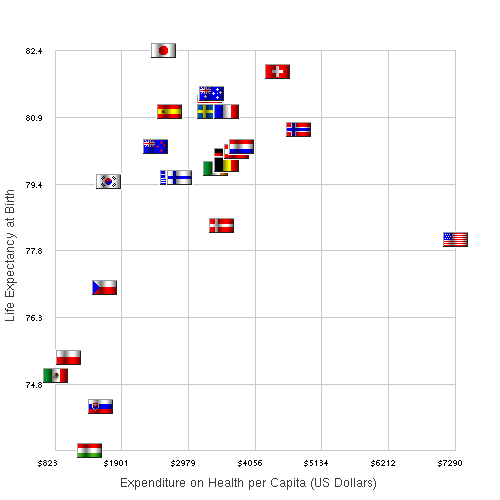
Life expectancy vs healthcare spending for some countries in 2007

The healthcare system receives funding from two sources. Municipal financing is based on taxes and is used to provide primary healthcare services. They also have a right to collect user fees, and receive state subsidies if their tax levy is not adequate for providing the public services required, based on the demographic factors on their area. Municipalities fund the health centers on the primary care level and regional hospitals on secondary care level. National Health Insurance (NHI) is based on compulsory fees and it is used to fund private healthcare, occupational healthcare, outpatient drugs and sickness allowance. Regional and university hospitals are financed by federations of participating municipalities, often using the diagnosis-related group system.

=== User fees ===
The out-of-pocket fee amount for a doctor's visit or treatment in the primary health care is set at a maximum of EUR 20,60 (in 2021) and the amount varies from one local authority to another. Hospital out-patients pay EUR 27.40 per consultation; in-patients pay a per diem charge of EUR 32.50. For long-term illnesses, the charges are based largely on income. Although a vital part for health financing and provision, the current system of the user fees has been discussed to contribute to the inequities in the access of health services among the low-income residents.

=== Health expenditure ===
Health expenditure in 2009 amounted to EUR 15.7 billion. By 2018 the expenditures had increased to EUR 21.1 billion. The public sector is the main source of health funding, 74.7% of health spending was funded by public sources in 2009, slightly more than the average of 71.7% in OECD countries. The share of public spending in Finland was, however, lower than in all other Nordic countries (Denmark, Iceland, Norway and Sweden) where it exceeds 80%. As in other OECD countries the health expenditure has been growing steadily since the year 2000. In 2009 health spending per capita in Finland is equal to the OECD average, with spending of EUR 2936 (or US$3226 adjusted for purchasing power parity). Municipalities spent on average about 1300 euros per inhabitant on health care in 2005. Health care accounted for about 25% of the municipal budget.

In a comparison of 16 countries on 2008 by Swedish Association of Local Authorities and Regions, Finland used the least resources and attained average results, making Finland the most efficient public sector health service producer according to the study's authors.

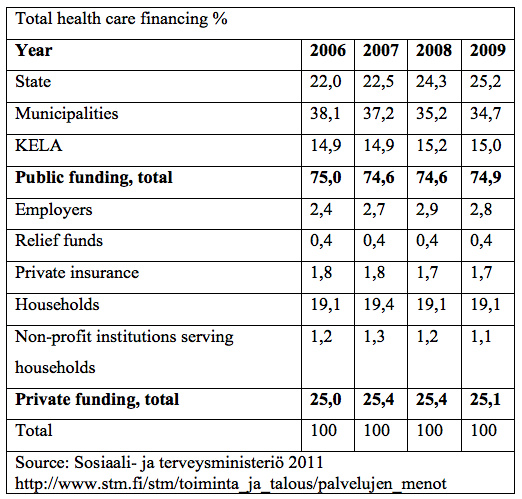
Health care financing %, in Finland 2006–2009

== Private sector ==
Due to the comprehensive public sector, private healthcare sector is relatively small. Between 3-4% of in-patient care is provided by the private healthcare system. Physiotherapy, dentistry and occupational health services are the most often used health services on the private sector. Approximately 10% of medical doctors work solely on private sector. Although high user fees may cause a barrier to use the private sector services as most is paid for out of pocket, a significant share of the cost is reimbursed by the Social Insurance Institution (SII) KELA.

Employers are obliged by law to provide occupational healthcare services for their employees, as are educational establishments for their students and staff. This can be done on public, or private sector.

== National health insurance ==
The statutory National Health Insurance (NHI) scheme covers all Finnish residents, and it is run by the Social Insurance Institution KELA through approximately 260 local offices all over the country. The responsibilities of this institute include coverage of some family benefits, National Health Insurance, rehabilitation, basic unemployment security, housing benefits, financial aid for students and state-guaranteed pensions. The NHI system offers varying levels of reimbursement for outpatient drugs, care from private providers, transport costs to health care facilities, sickness and maternity leave allowances, and some rehabilitation services. The NHI also partially reimburses occupational healthcare costs for services delivered to employees, but not to dependents.

Additional voluntary health insurance has a very marginal role in the Finnish system and is mainly used to supplement the reimbursement rate of NHI.

== Pharmaceuticals ==
Outpatient pharmaceuticals, including over-the-counter drugs, can only be sold to patients by pharmacies. Providers can only deliver drugs that are actually administered within their facilities. Health centers can give outpatient drugs to patients when local pharmacies are closed, but only in the dosage needed to cover the time until the pharmacy reopens. Finland limits medicine sales to about 800 licensed pharmacies. It has the highest proportion of pharmacists per head in Europe - 127 per 100,000 in 2015.

Electronic prescribing is used in all pharmacies and public healthcare, and the private sector will deploy it by the end of 2014. Electronic prescribing has improved patient medication management. The process enables accuracy in data acquisition and also prescription data before any transmission is done. In Finland, e-prescribing has also reinforced the process of ensuring the authenticity of the prescriptions given to patients.

== Health information technology ==
Electronic Patient Records (EPR) have been in used since 2007 virtually in every healthcare provider. The development of health information systems has been largely uncoordinated at the national level, partly due to the decentralized healthcare system. As a result, several non-interoperable information systems are often used even within a single organization, which inhibits information exchange within and across provider organizations. Efforts are underway to create a common, national structure for communication between patients and providers over the internet. It is a form of e-Health service that will promote health information Exchange (HIE). The importance of e-Health services in healthcare system is to help increase efficiency in acquisition, storage, retrieval and transfer of important healthcare information. Telemedicine and e-Health are forms of technologies in healthcare that have been useful such as remote patient monitoring during the COVID-19 pandemic.

The Finnish Coordinating Center for Health Technology Assessment (FinCCHTA) was established in 2018 to coordinate the national health technology assessment (HTA) network in Finland. Its legal mandate stems from the 2017 Government Decree on the Division of Labor and Centralization in Specialized Healthcare (Decree 582/2017), which officially assigned this national coordinating task to the North Ostrobothnia Hospital District, known today as the Wellbeing Services County of North Ostrobothnia (Pohde). Based at the Oulu University Hospital, the core of FinCCHTA's mandate revolves around the comprehensive umbrella term "health technology" (terveydenhuollon menetelmät). This broad scope covers all healthcare methods, procedures, and interventions used for prevention, diagnosis, treatment, and monitoring, including medical devices, pharmaceuticals, clinical procedures, administrative systems, and digital health applications assessed under the specialized Digi-HTA framework. FinCCHTA participates in international HTA collaboration, coordinates the national network, develops methodological training, and strengthens evidence-based research to guide efficient resource allocation across Finland's healthcare systems.

== Immigrant health care ==
As per to the principle of the universal coverage, immigrants who live in Finland permanently are entitled to all the same health services as the Finnish people. Holders of the European Health Insurance Card are also entitled to care in Finland. According to the Act on Adaptation of Immigrants and Reception of Asylum Seekers, asylum seekers are entitled to the same health services as permanent residents. These services must be organized by reception centers for refugees. It has been reported that immigrant health problems often may go untreated, and that immigrants use the public health system less than the general population. Health information to immigrants are provided with several languages by Infopankki.fi.

On December 9, 2013, the City of Helsinki decided, that all minors under the age of 18 and all pregnant mothers living in Helsinki without a valid visa or residence permit, are granted the right to the same healthcare and at the same price as all citizens of the city. This service will be available sometime early year 2014. Volunteer doctors of Global Clinic have tried to help these people, for whom only acute care has been available. This means that the Finnish system is open for people coming outside of the European Union. The service covers special child healthcare, maternity clinics and specialist medical care etc.

== Health equity ==
Equity is highly valued in Finland and the law provides same rights for all citizens, including in healthcare. There still exists some geographic and socioeconomic disparities. Perhaps one of the most important reasons for the socioeconomic differences in the use of services is that the private sector and occupational healthcare, which are less accessible to the low-income population, offer better access to services (e.g. a major difference is waiting times) than the municipal sector. Narrowing health gaps has been the objective of Finnish health policy since the 1980s, however, this objective has not been fully achieved.

According to health care study 2018 in Finland, approximately 25% of persons reported having to cut back on food and other necessities to afford their medicine costs, while approximately 10% reported being unable to purchase medication they needed due to a lack of funds.

=== Health Protection ===
Finland has established several services to necessitate the health protection of various groups of individuals against infectious diseases.

One of the areas that the service has focused on is influenza vaccination for the elderly. However, there are still regional differences in implementing and accomplishing a better vaccination program. Data shows that from 2017 to 2018, the elderly, mainly aged 65 years and above, received the influenza vaccine, accounting for about 48% of the elderly population. This is still lagging behind the European Union requirement, which set the threshold at 75% as the target for vaccination of the elderly.

Reducing the number of hepatitis C infections is another health protection measure. In the year 2018, about 1,200 cases of hepatitis C infections were confirmed. Substance abuse primarily through injections seems to be one of the contributing factors of increased hepatitis C infection cases since half of these cases were related to drug use through injections. One way to reduce this is by the country coming up with services like health advice through counters in municipalities where people are advised on ways of quitting the use of drugs.

The use of antibiotics unnecessarily has been reduced to promote health and prevent an increase in antimicrobial resistance of the population in Finland. Comparing Finland's antibacterial use with international data, the country emerges as the least common to consume these types of drugs.

== See also ==
- Health in Finland
