= Regatta (disambiguation) =

A Regatta is a series of boat races.

Regatta may also refer to:

- Regatta (clothing), a British clothing brand
- Reggatta de Blanc, a 1979 album by the band The Police
  - "Reggatta de Blanc (instrumental)", a song from the album
- Cafe Regatta, a café in Helsinki, Finland
- Regata, a Yugoslav rock band
- Fiat Regata, an automobile produced from 1983 to 1990
- "Regatta" (Balamory), a 2002 television episode
