= Rowing Stadium =

Rowing Stadium may refer to:

- Töölö Rowing Stadium, in Helsinki, Finland
- Rodrigo de Freitas Lagoon, on Rio de Janeiro, Brazil
