= Kristuskyrkan =

Christ Church
- Kristuskyrkan
- Helsingfors svenska metodistförsamling
- transl. Christ Church; Finnish: Kristuskirkko
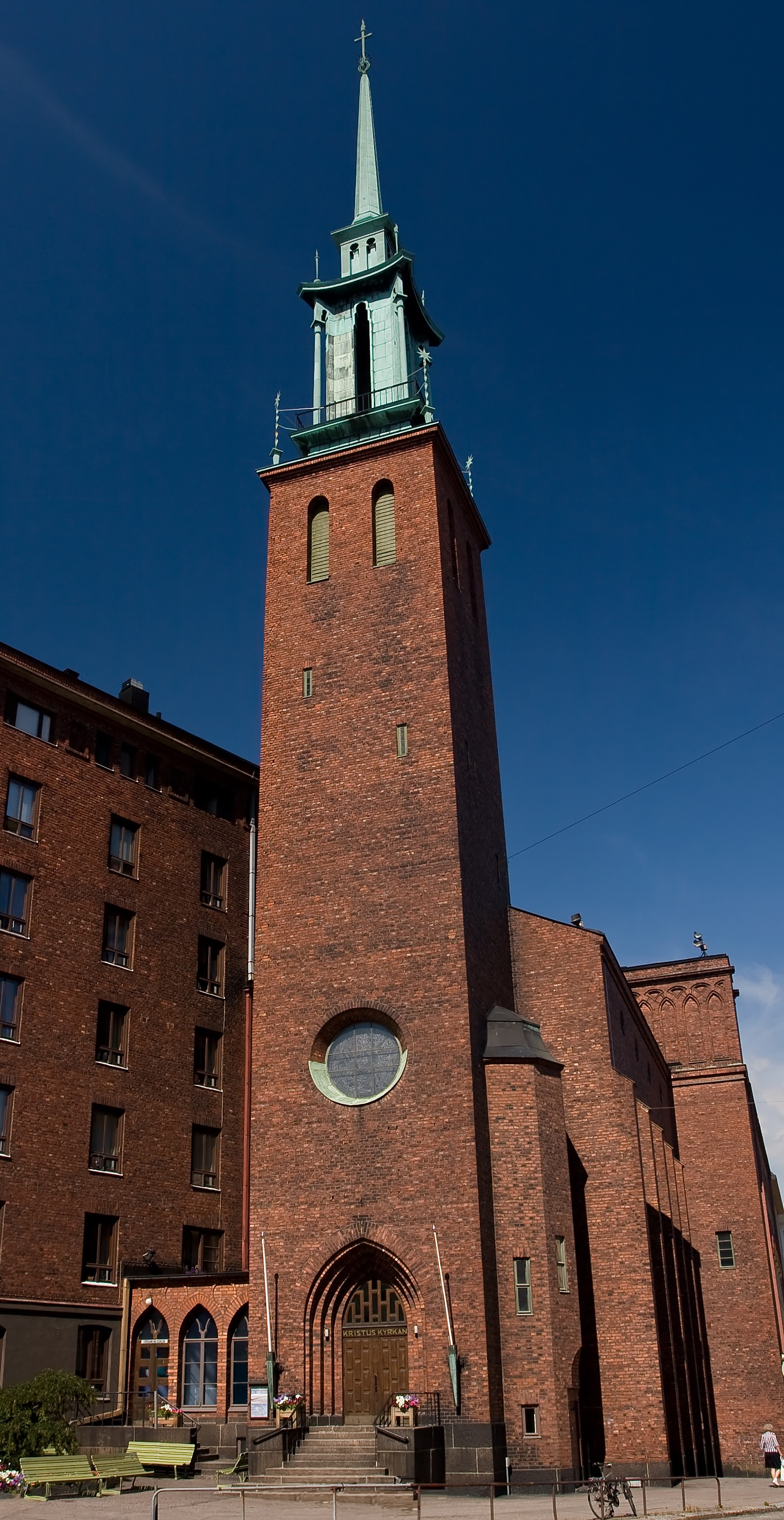
- Christ Church
- 60°10′33″N 24°55′38″E
- Location: Helsinki
- Country: Finland
- Denomination: Christianity, Methodism
- Website: Helsingfors svenska metodistförsamling

History
- Consecrated: 1928

Architecture
- Functional status: active
- Architect: Atte W.Willberg
- Style: Neo-Gothic
- Groundbreaking: 19 September 1926
- Completed: 23 September 1928

Specifications
- Capacity: 220

Administration
- Diocese: Helsinki
- Parish: Helsinki – Etu-Töölö

Kristuskyrkan (Church of Christ) is a Christian church in Helsinki, Finland, located in the central district of Etu-Töölö (Swedish: Främre Tölö) at the corner between Fänrik Ståls Street and Apollonkatu Street. It was built at the beginning of the twentieth century and it is part of the Swedish Methodist Church of Finland.

== Architecture and history ==
The architectural structure follows simple, austere vertical lines and is a good example of Finnish neo-Gothic style. It was built between 1926 and 1928 according to the designs and the directions of the architect Atte V. Willberg to whom the realization of the church was commissioned. The church was consecrated officially with its inaugural mass on 23.9.1928. The 59-meter bell tower of the church with its spire is a distinctive feature of the skyline of the city.

=== Rose window ===
In line with the characteristic of Gothic architecture, a large rose window is present on the church facade above the main entrance. The beautiful glass-work designed by the artist Lennart Rafael Segerstråle (1892–1975) is titled "Praise to Creation" (in Swedish Skapelsens lovsång). In it the spiritual praise to God's creation is epitomized by the figure of David playing the harp surrounded by floral and vegetable motifs. A circular staircase accessible from the porch's right side leads to the upper loggia inside the church, from which it is possible to admire at a closer distance the intricate design of the glazed window.

=== The gallery's fresco ===
Upon entering the church, passing the vestibule (vapenrum), and looking up to the ceiling of the gallery, it is possible to admire the fresco painted by Carl August Henry Ericsson (1898–1933). The work symbolizes the tree of spiritual life whose branches extend all over the world. Around the central figure of the angel, twelve doves are seen flying spreading their wings, crowned by aureoles (halos). They represent the twelve apostles with the divine message of salvation for the whole world.

=== Pipe organ ===
Located on the upper loggia overlooking the nave, the pipe organ has 15 stops. The instrument was manufactured in the city of Kangasala by the Kangasala Urkutehdas and designed by the Finnish organist Asko Rautioaho who designed the instrument in such a way that the stained glass window of the façade located behind the organ itself emerges from the profile of the musical instrument and is also visible from the inside of the church.

== Gallery ==
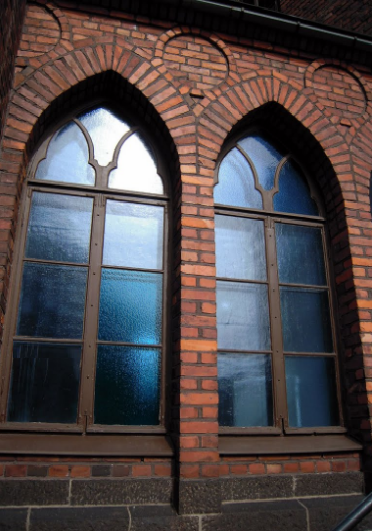

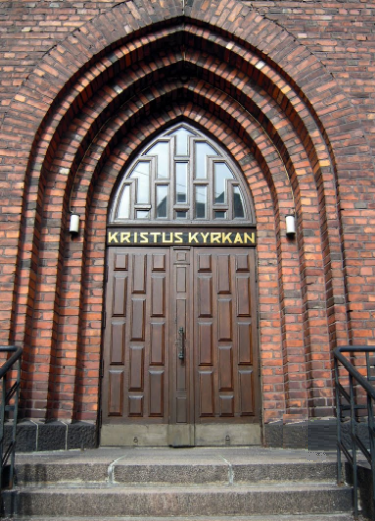

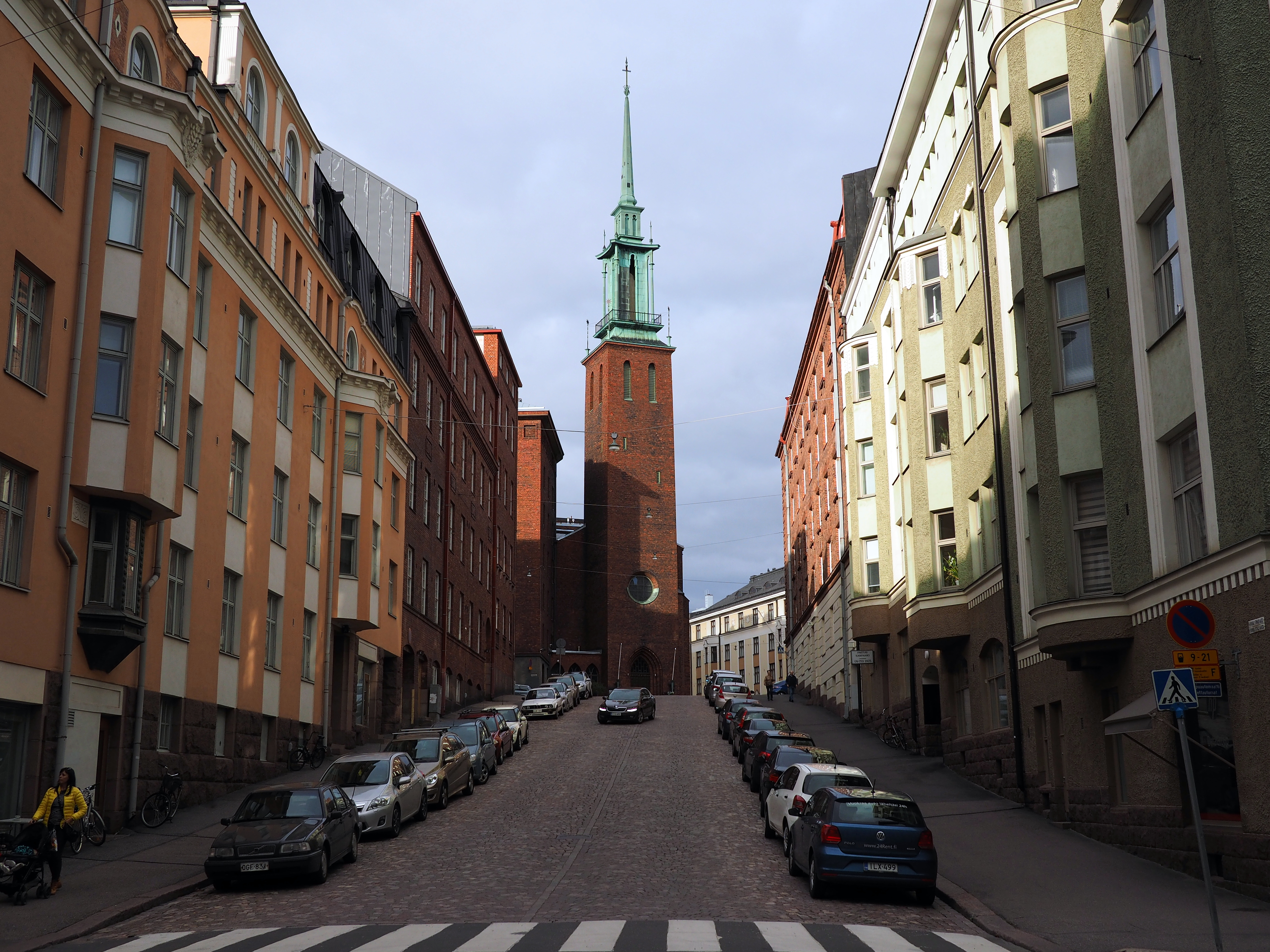

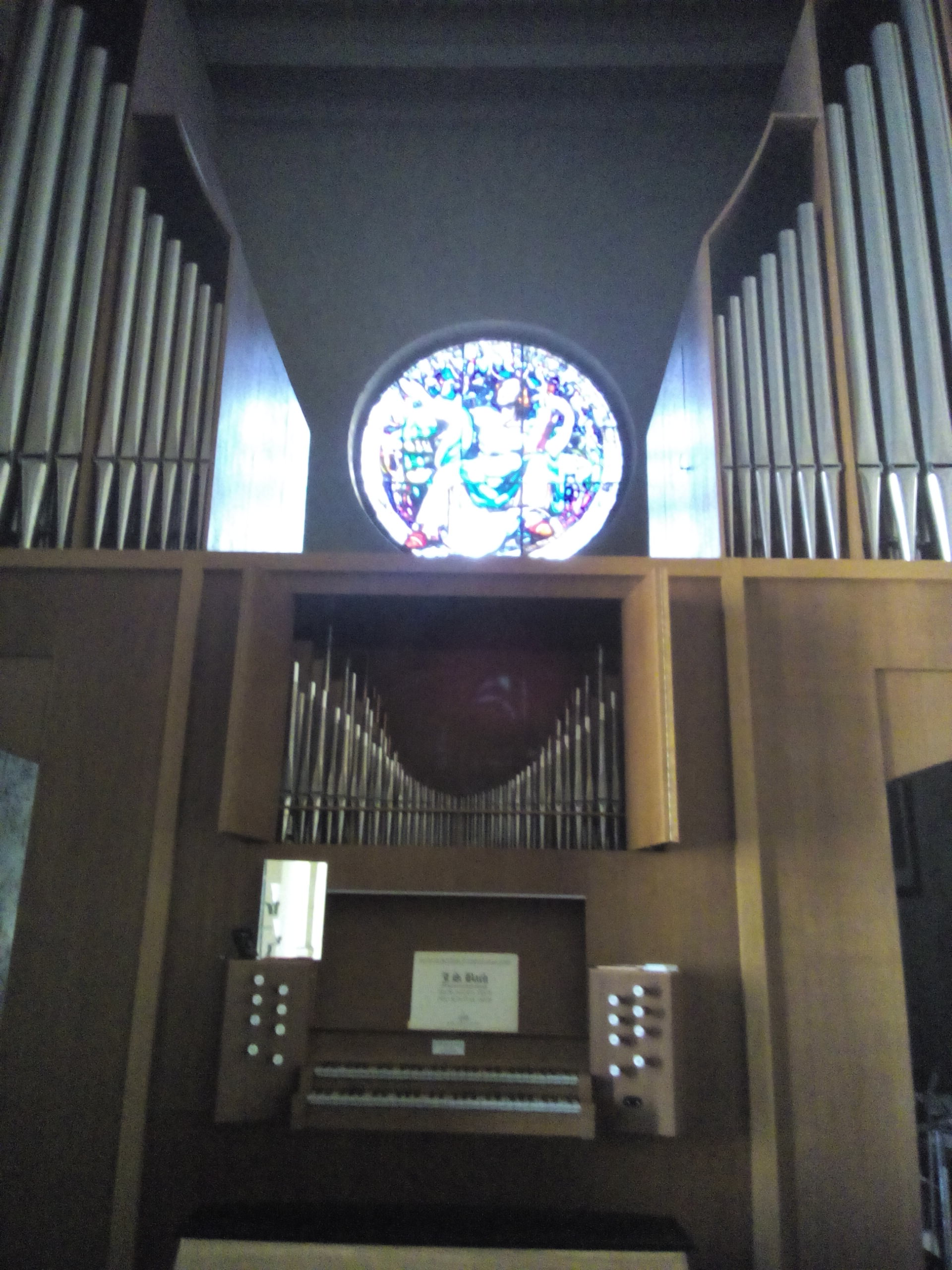

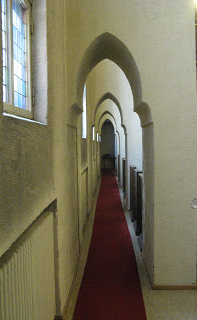

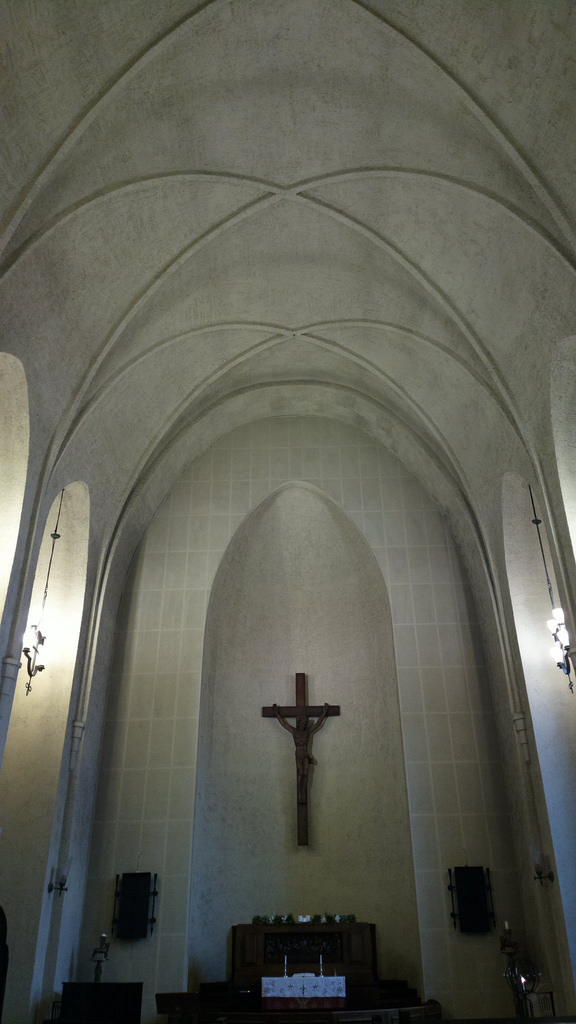

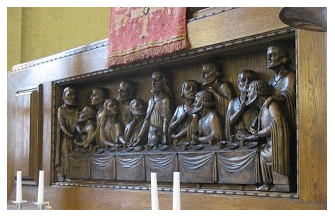

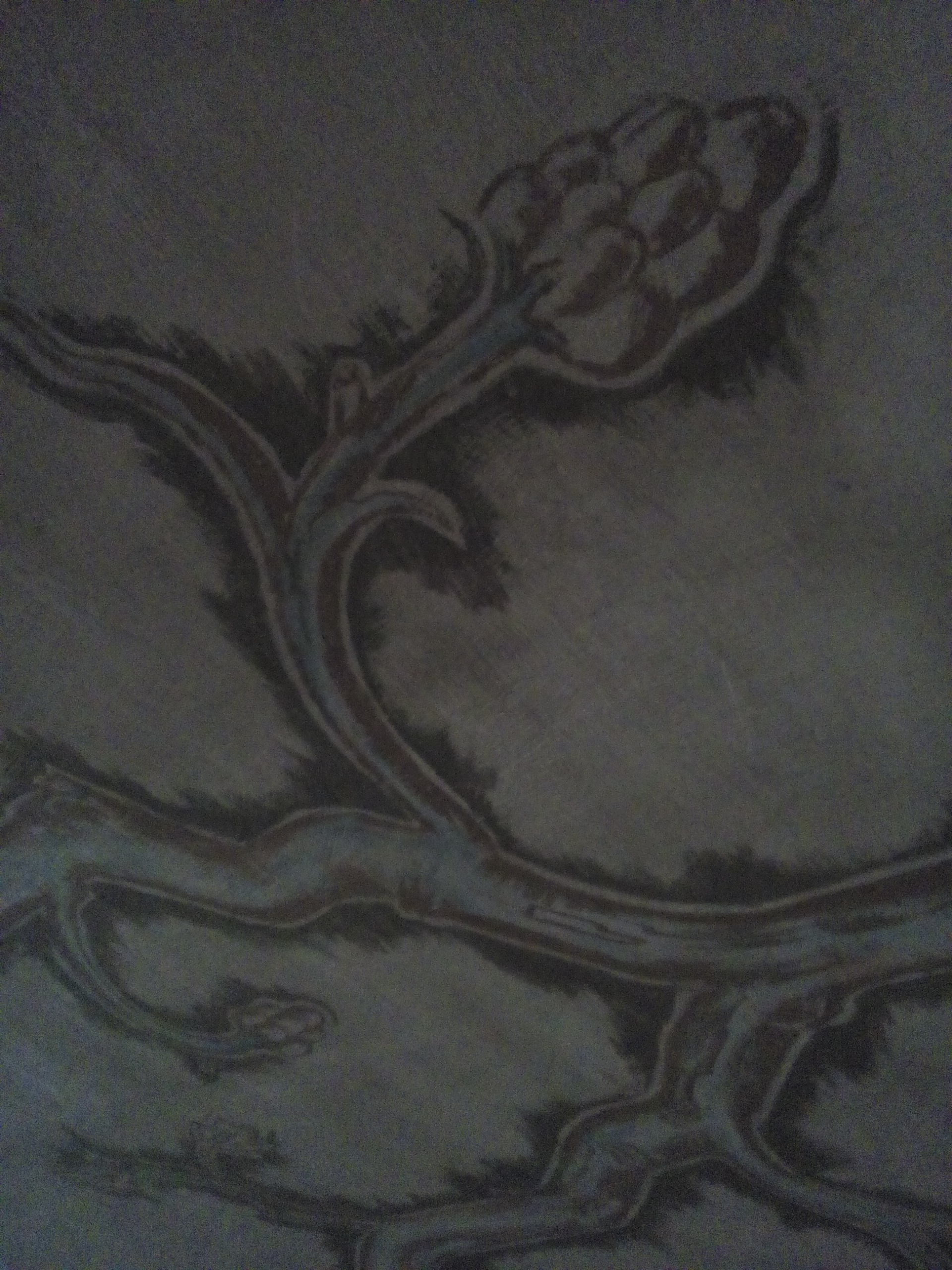

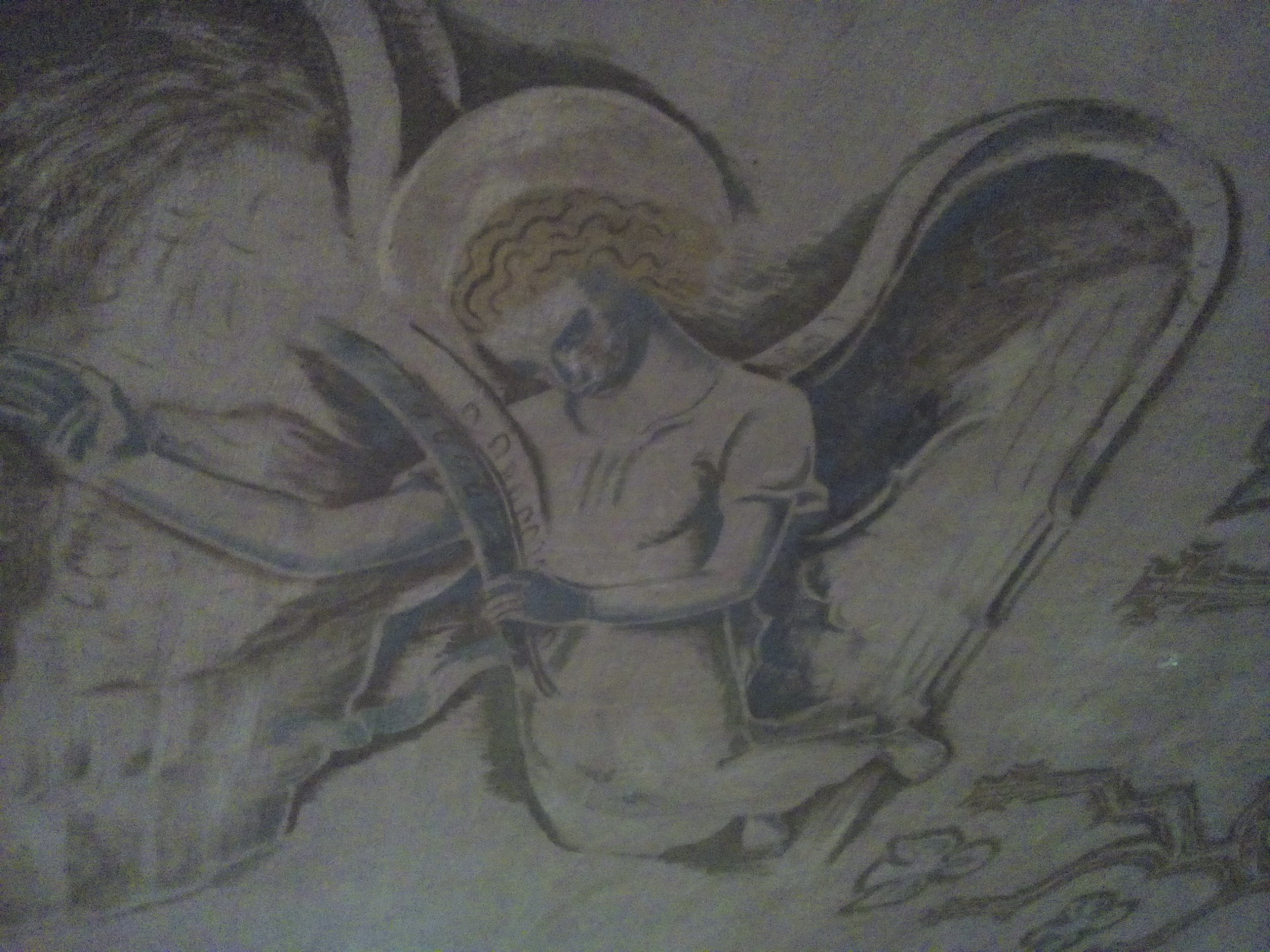

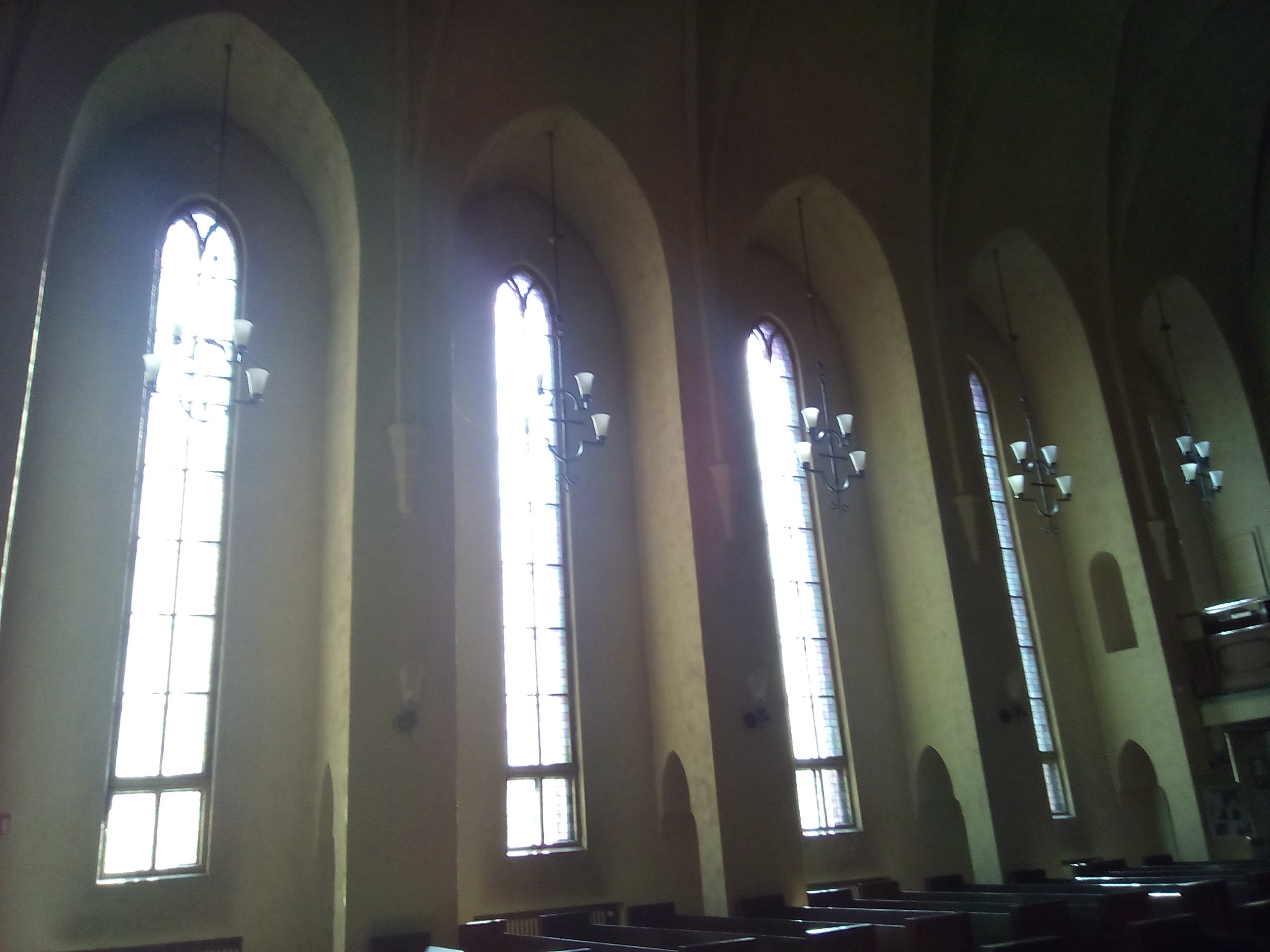

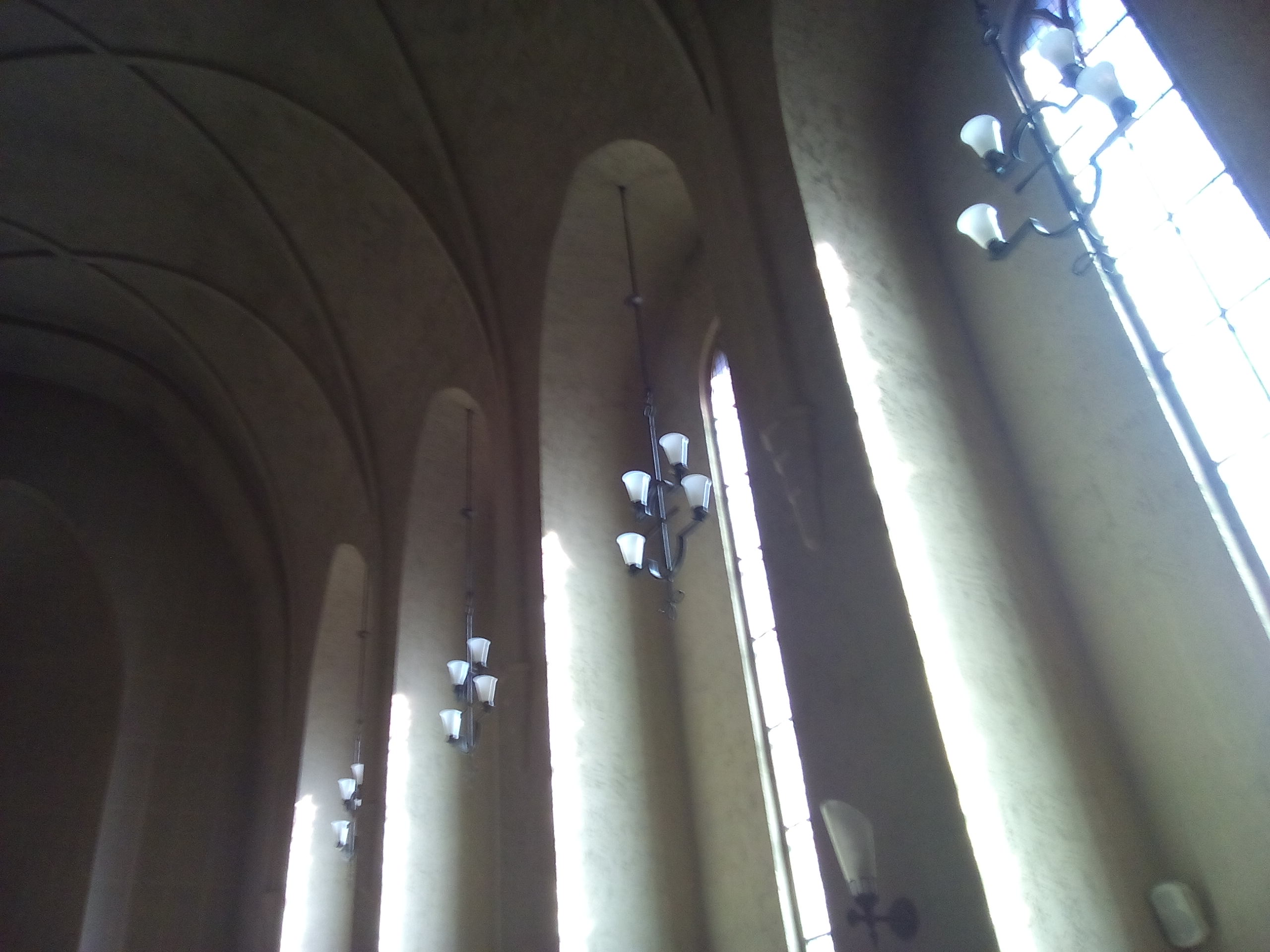

== See also ==
- (in Finnish) Finnish Neo-gothic Churches (fi.wiki)
- Helsinki Finnish Methodist Church

=== External links ===
- Media related to Kristuskyrkan at Wikimedia Commons
- (in Swedish) Kristus Kyrkan in Helsinki
- (in Swedish) Kristuskyrkan Facebook Page
- (in Swedish) Artist: Henry Ericsson- "Biografiskt lexikon för Finland"
- (in English) Artist: Lennart Segerstrale: Life and Works
