= Arvonen =

Arvonen is a Finnish surname. Notable people with the surname include:

- Aarne Arvonen (1897–2009), Finnish supercentenarian
- Pasi Arvonen (born 1968), Finnish ice hockey coach

== See also ==
- Aronen
