= Helsinki Finnish Methodist Church =

- Helsinki Finnish Methodist Congregation
- Finnish: Helsingin metodistiseurakunta Finnish: Helsingfors finska metodistförsamling
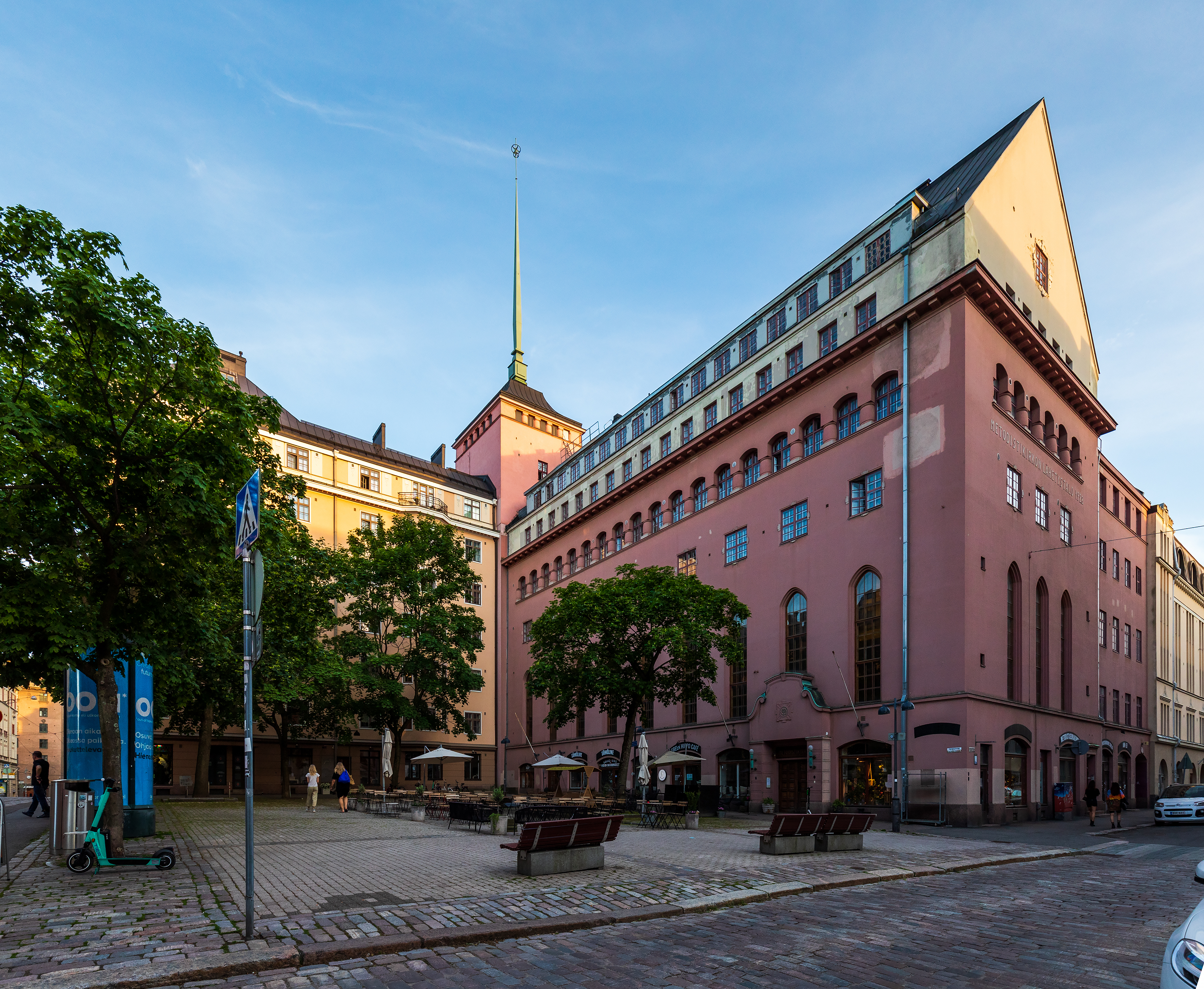
- Helsinki Finnish Methodist Church
- 60°09′42.16″N 24°56′22.71″E
- Location: Punavuori, Helsinki
- Country: Finland
- Website: Helsinki United Methodist Church

History
- Founded: 1894; 132 years ago

Administration
- Diocese: Finnish Methodist Church

The Helsinki Finnish Methodist Church (also known as the Helsinki Finnish Methodist Congregation; Finnish: Helsingin metodistiseurakunta; Finnish: Helsingfors finska metodistförsamling) is a Finnish Methodist congregation in Helsinki, Finland. It belongs to the Finnish Methodist Church and was founded in 1894. The current congregation building is located in the Punavuori district of Helsinki.

The congregation regularly organizes bilingual worship activities; mission circles, Bible evenings, moments of prayer and youth evenings also meet regularly in the congregation.

Helsinki also has another, Swedish-speaking Methodist congregation.

== History ==
The congregation was founded in 1894 and in the early days the congregation met in rented premises. In 1909, the congregation bought a wooden house in Punavuori. In 1928, the congregation started building a new church at the same place, and the congregation's wooden house was moved to Malmi. In 1929, a current church building was completed.

== See also ==
- Kristuskyrkan
- Methodism in Finland
