= Cafe Regatta =

Café in Helsinki, Finland

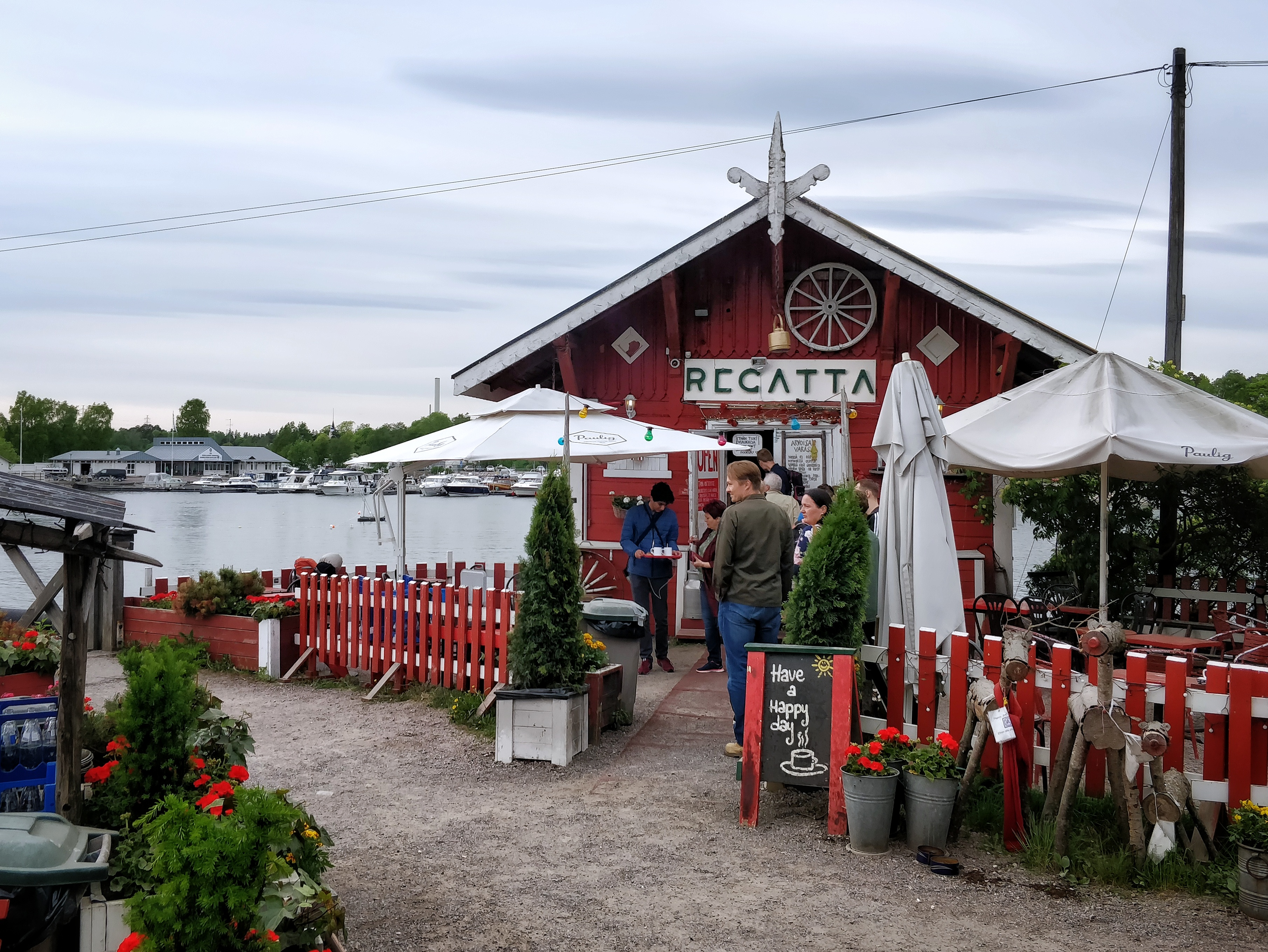
- Cafe Regatta in May 2018

General information
- Location: Taka-Töölö, Helsinki, Finland
- Address: Merikannontie 8
- Coordinates: 60°10′48.58″N 24°54′42.21″E
- Completed: 1887; 138 years ago

Website
- www.caferegatta.fi

Cafe Regatta is a café in Taka-Töölö, Helsinki, Finland. The café building is a small red log cabin that has been located in the same place on the Merikannontie street, on the shores of the Taivallahti bay, since 1887. There are several attractions nearby, such as the Sibelius Monument, the Töölö Rowing Stadium (built for the 1952 Summer Olympics), and the old Villa Humlevik. The café was originally a fishing shed of Paulig's coffee business family in the late 19th century.

Cafe Regatta is small indoors, but weather permitting, there are more seats on the café's terrace, which offers sea views. The owner and the terrace of the café have been originally decorated with various utensils and signs. The café's terrace has a fireplace for frying sausages. In addition to café products, Regatta's selections include equipment rental; during the summer season, a canoe, kayak, rowing boat or SUP board can be rented from the café.

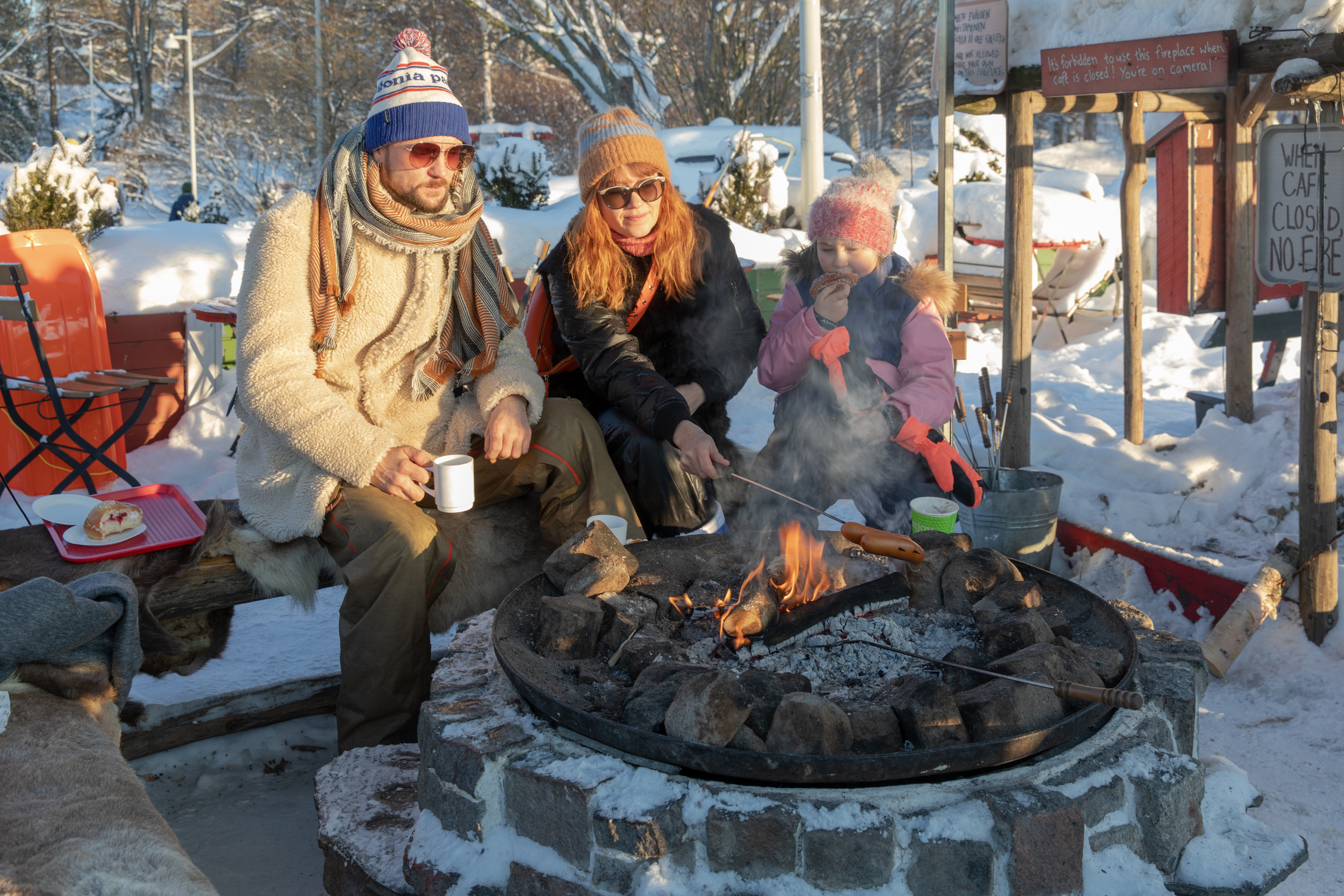
Frying sausages at Cafe Regatta

The café is mentioned on various tourist sites presenting Helsinki, so in addition to locals, there are also a lot of foreign tourists visiting there. Tripadvisor has received a number of reviews and a high rating of 4.5 out of 5 stars. Cafe Regatta also won the title of the best café in the city in the 2014 big restaurant vote of the City magazine.

== See also ==
- Allas Sea Pool
- Café Ekberg
- Robert's Coffee
