= Carl August Henry Ericsson =

Finnish artist

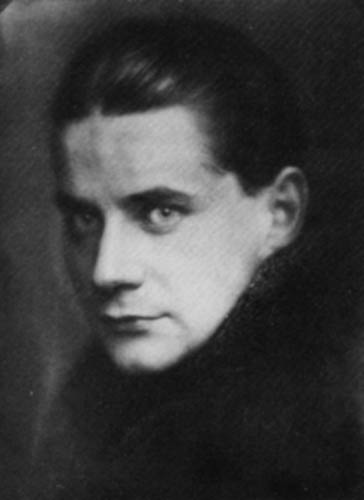
Henry Ericsson

Carl August Henry Ericsson (6 February 1898 in Mikkeli, Finland – 16 October 1933 in Porvoo), was a Finnish graphic artist and decorative painter.

== Life ==
Henry Ericsson was the son of Lieutenant Alexander Ericsson and Carolina Albertina Valeriana Aspling. He graduated from the Central Academy of Fine Arts 1915–1918 and 1919, at the Accademia di Belle Arti di Roma in Rome and at Académie Colarossi and Académie de la Grande Chaumiere in Paris 1922–1924.

== Gallery ==
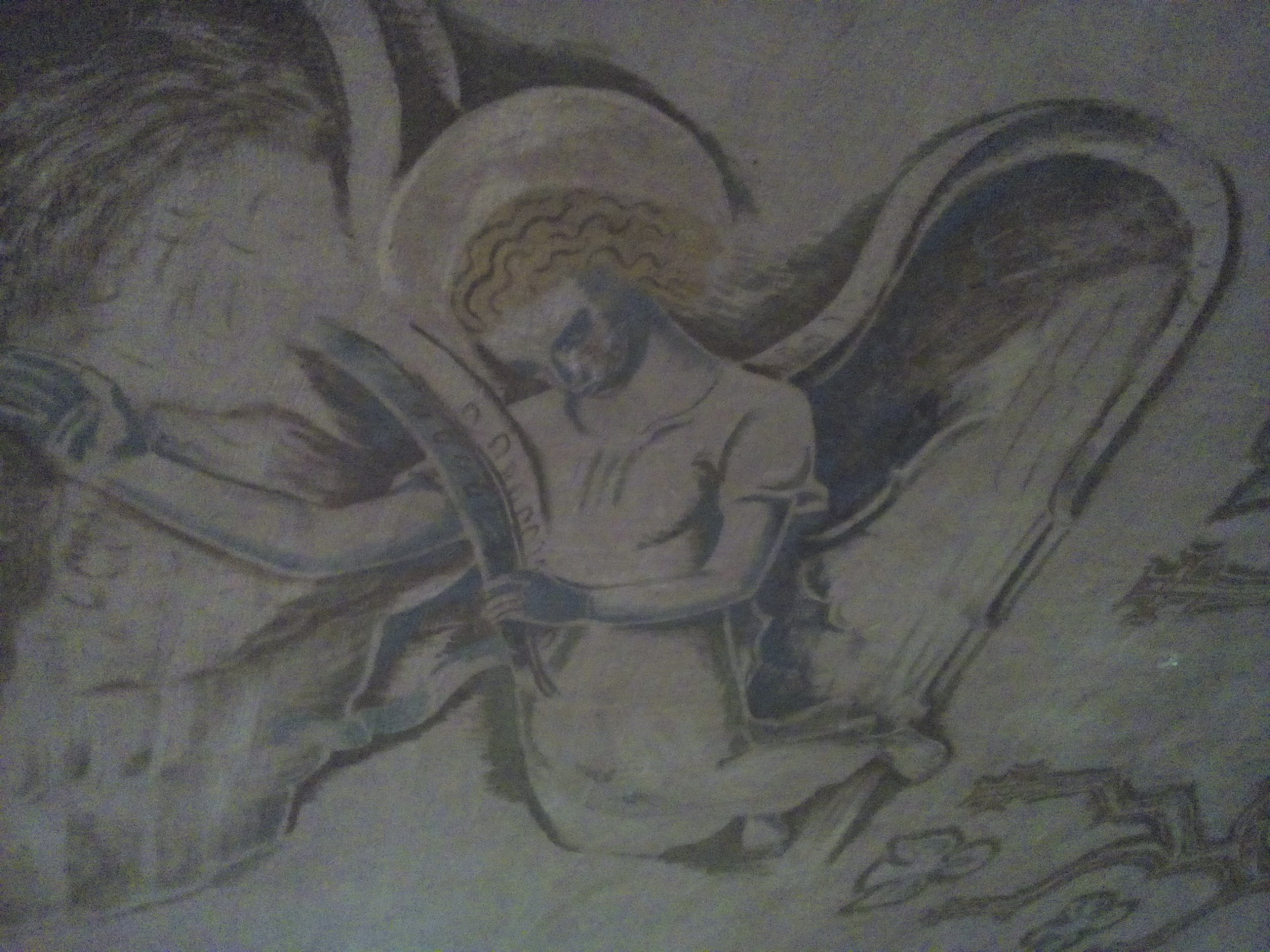
Fresco painting in Kristuskyrkan ( Christus Church ) in Helsinki (detail of the angel)

== Bibliography ==
- Christoffer H. Ericsson: Min far – en konstnärsbiografi, Litorale, Borgå 2002, ISBN 952-5045-12-9
