= Aronen =

Surname list

Aronen is a Finnish surname. Notable people with the surname include:

- Eeva-Kaarina Aronen (1948–2015), Finnish author and journalist
- Nestori Aronen (1876–1954), Finnish politician
- Toivo Aronen (1886–1973), Finnish politician
