= Töölö =

Neighbourhoods in Helsinki, Finland

Coordinates: 60°10′45″N 024°55′26″E

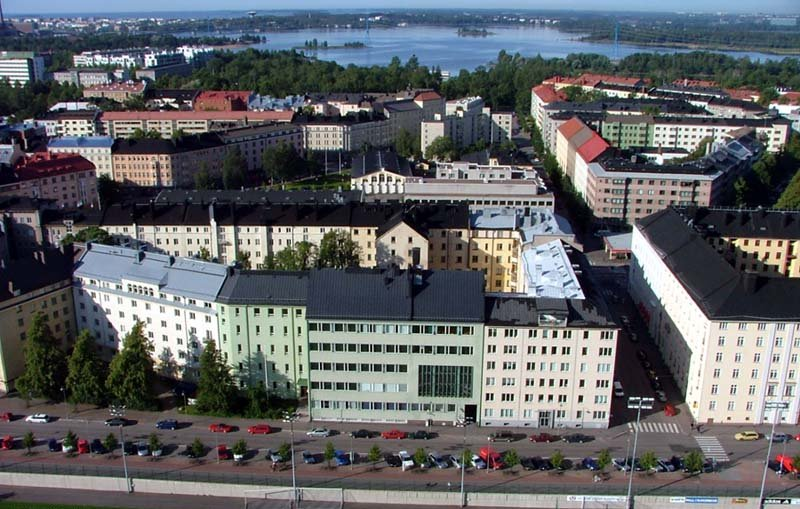
Töölö as seen from the Helsinki Olympic Stadium tower

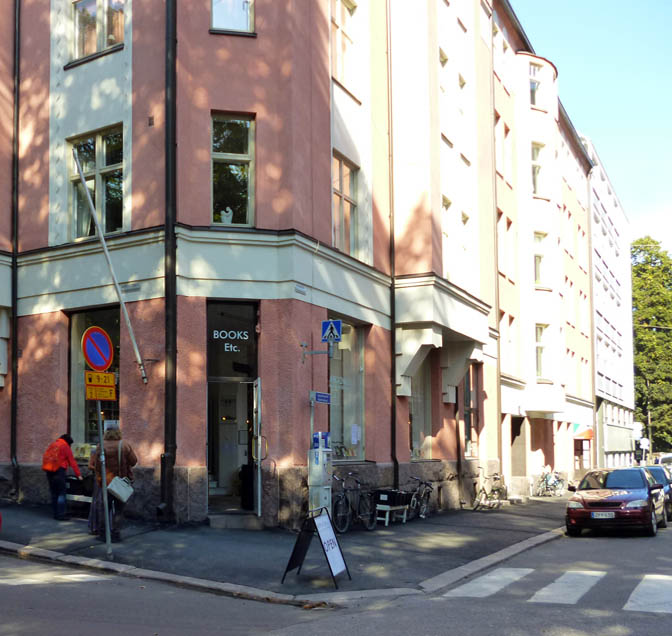
Bookstore on the corner of Nervanderinkatu, Töölö

Töölö (Finnish: [ˈtøːlø]; Swedish: Tölö, formerly spelled Thölö) is the collective name for the neighbourhoods Etu-Töölö (Swedish: Främre Tölö, lit. 'Front Töölö') and Taka-Töölö (Swedish: Bortre Tölö, lit. 'Rear Töölö') in Helsinki, Finland. The neighbourhoods are located next to the city centre, occupying the western side of the Helsinki Peninsula.

Etu-Töölö, the southern neighbourhood, borders Kamppi and is the location of the Finnish Parliament House. Taka-Töölö, the northern neighbourhood, borders Meilahti and Laakso, and is the location of the Helsinki University Central Hospital. Contrary to popular belief, Töölö is no longer an official name of any district or neighbourhood in Helsinki; in 1959 Töölö was divided into Etu-Töölö and Taka-Töölö.

== Overview ==
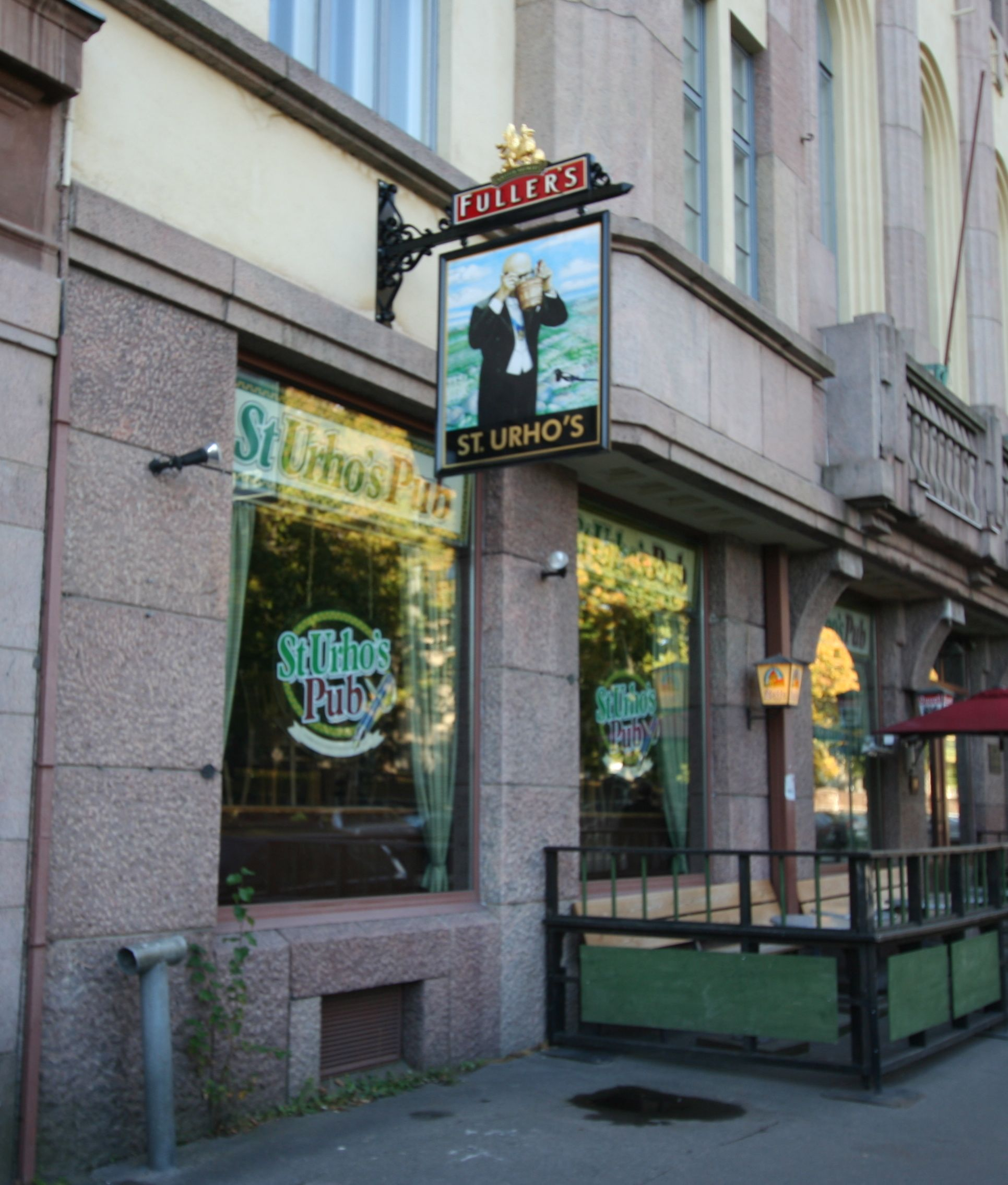
St. Urho's Pub in Etu-Töölö

Töölö was built in its present form, for the most part, in the period between 1900 and 1930 during an era of rapid expansion with the aim to provide appropriate accommodation to a growing bourgeoise population. It was the site of the first ever town planning competition in Finland in 1898–1900. Three entries were lifted out for recognition; first prize was awarded to architect Gustaf Nyström (together with engineer Herman Norrmén), second prize to architect Lars Sonck, and third prize to a joint entry by Sonck together with architects Bertil Jung and Valter Thomé. Nyström's scheme represented classicism with wide main streets and imposing public buildings arranged in symmetrical axial compositions, and the other two entries following two picturesque theories of town planning proposed at that time by Viennese city planner Camillo Sitte, with the street network adapted to the rocky terrain and with picturesque compositions. Undecided what course of action to take, however, the City Council asked the prize-winners to submit new proposals. When this led to further stalemate Nyström and Sonck were commissioned to work together on the final plan combining Nyström's spacious street network and elements of Sonck's Sittesque details. The final plan (1906) under the direction of Jung, made the scheme more uniform, while the architecture is seen as typical of the Nordic Classicism style. A typical street in the plan is that of Museokatu, with tall lines of buildings in a classical style along a curving street line. A still wider (24 metres) new tree-lined boulevard was that of Helsinginkatu, driven through the working-class district of Kallio, first outlined in 1887 by Sonck, but with further input from Nyström, and completed in around 1923. However, despite these wide streets there are also several Sitte-inspired picturesque streets and squares, most notably Temppeliaukio square (in the centre of which is the "church in the rock").

Töölö has always been the most respected as a place to live, but the prices of apartments are high, especially in Etu-Töölö. In Töölö, the marketing times for apartments are clearly shorter and the prices per square meter are therefore higher than in the rest of Helsinki on average, which speaks of abundant demand. A square of living in Töölö costs about €8,000, which is close to the price level of the second most popular district, Lauttasaari, but clearly less than in Ullanlinna, where a square of living costs closer to €10,000.

Töölö is also known for its functionalist architecture, notably around Taka-Töölö. There are many parks, including Hesperia Park on the Töölö Bay and also Sibelius Park, named after composer Jean Sibelius and containing a monument in his name. Töölö also has a vibrant cultural life, being the location of the Finnish National Opera, the National Museum of Finland, Kunsthalle Helsinki, the Zoological Museum, Töölö Library, and many small galleries and bookstores. With the Olympic Stadium, Sonera Stadium, the Sports Hall and the Ice Hall, all within walking distance from each other, Taka-Töölö is also a significant neighbourhood for sport life in Helsinki.

== Notable people ==
- Eeva-Kaarina Aronen (1948–2015), author and journalist

== Notable sights ==
- Parliament
- Temppeliaukio church
- Sibelius Monument
- Kristuskyrkan Swedish church
- The National Museum of Finland
- Finlandia Hall
- Finnish National Opera
- Helsinki Olympic Stadium
- Hietaniemi Cemetery
- Cafe Regatta

== See also ==
- Kluuvi
- Töölöntori

== Gallery ==
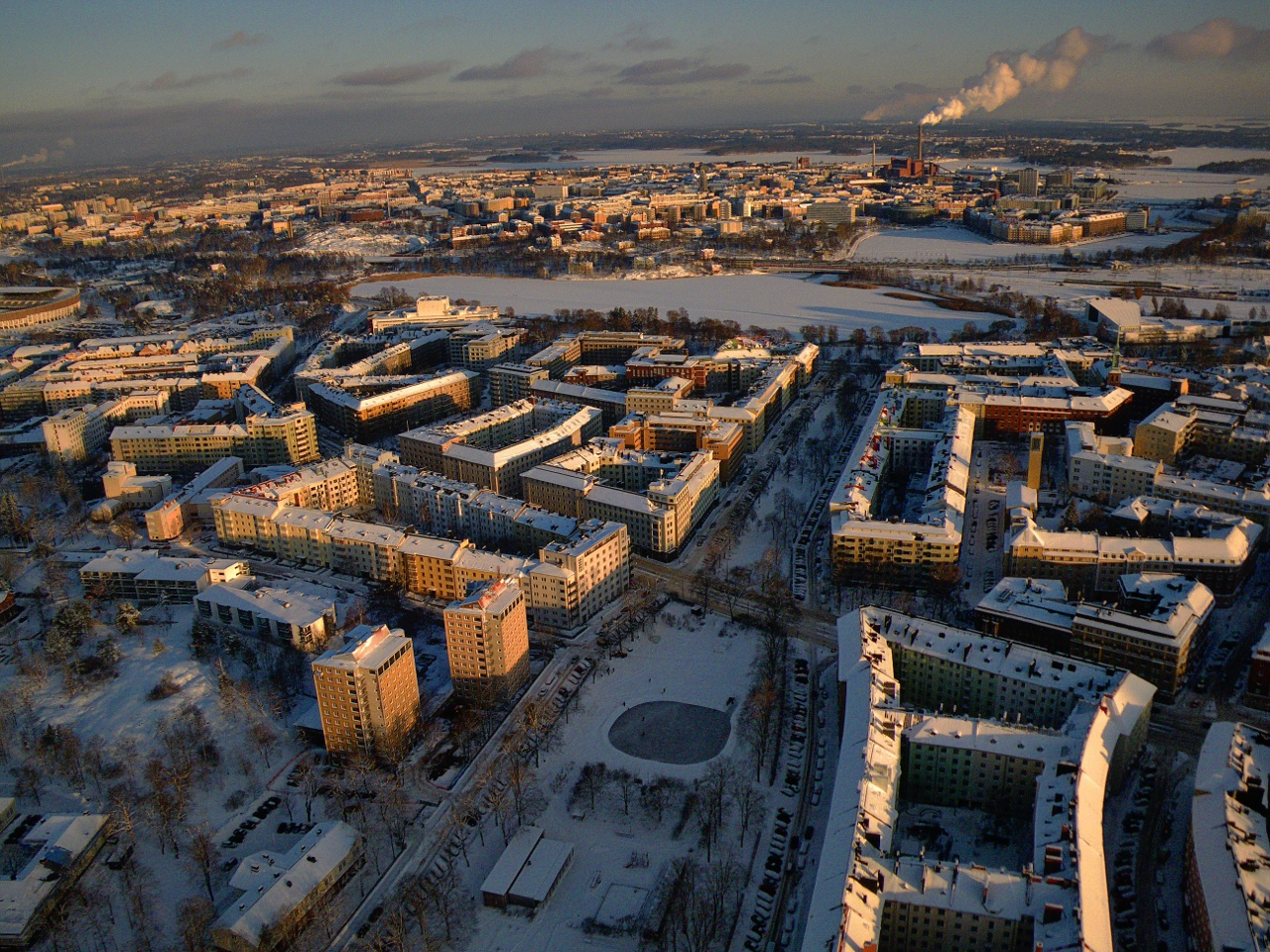
Töölö from air.

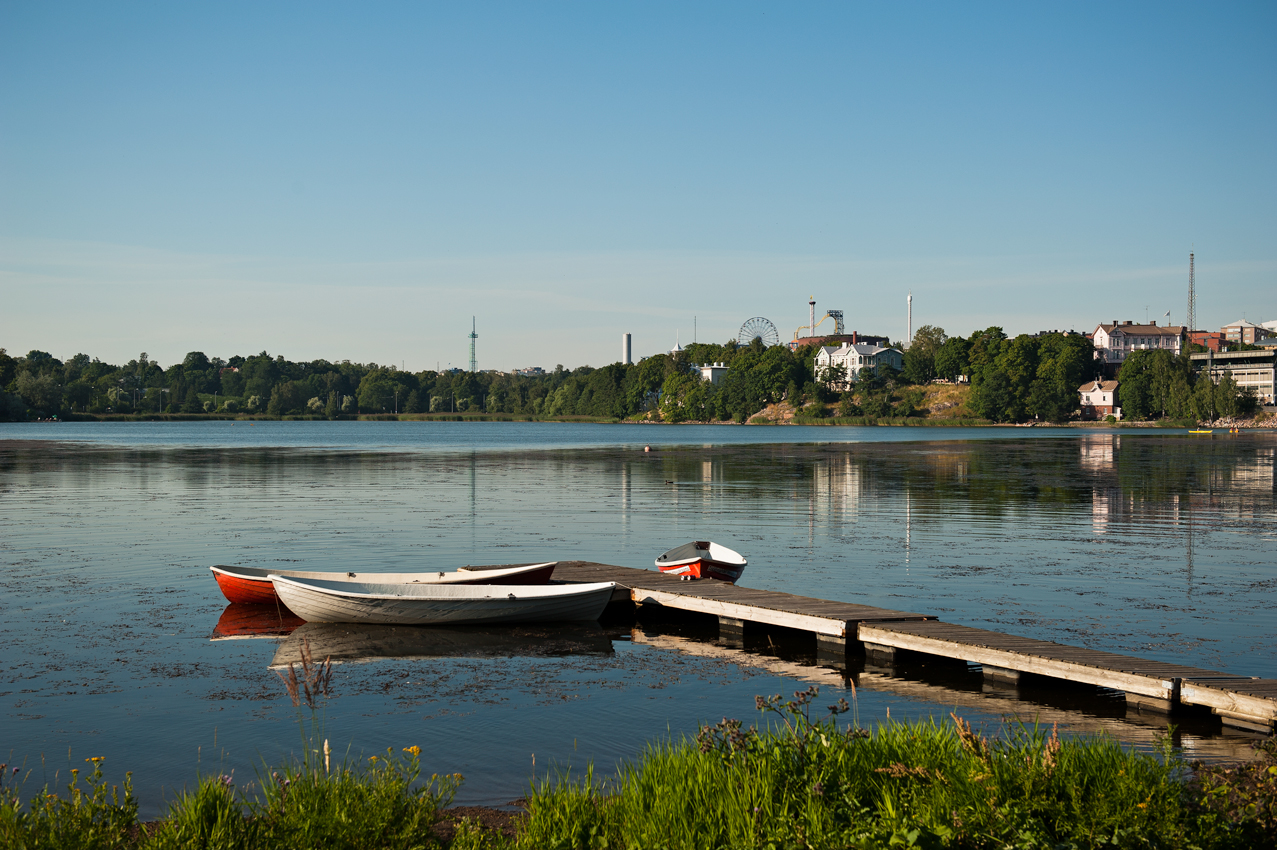
View from the south shore of Töölönlahti bay.

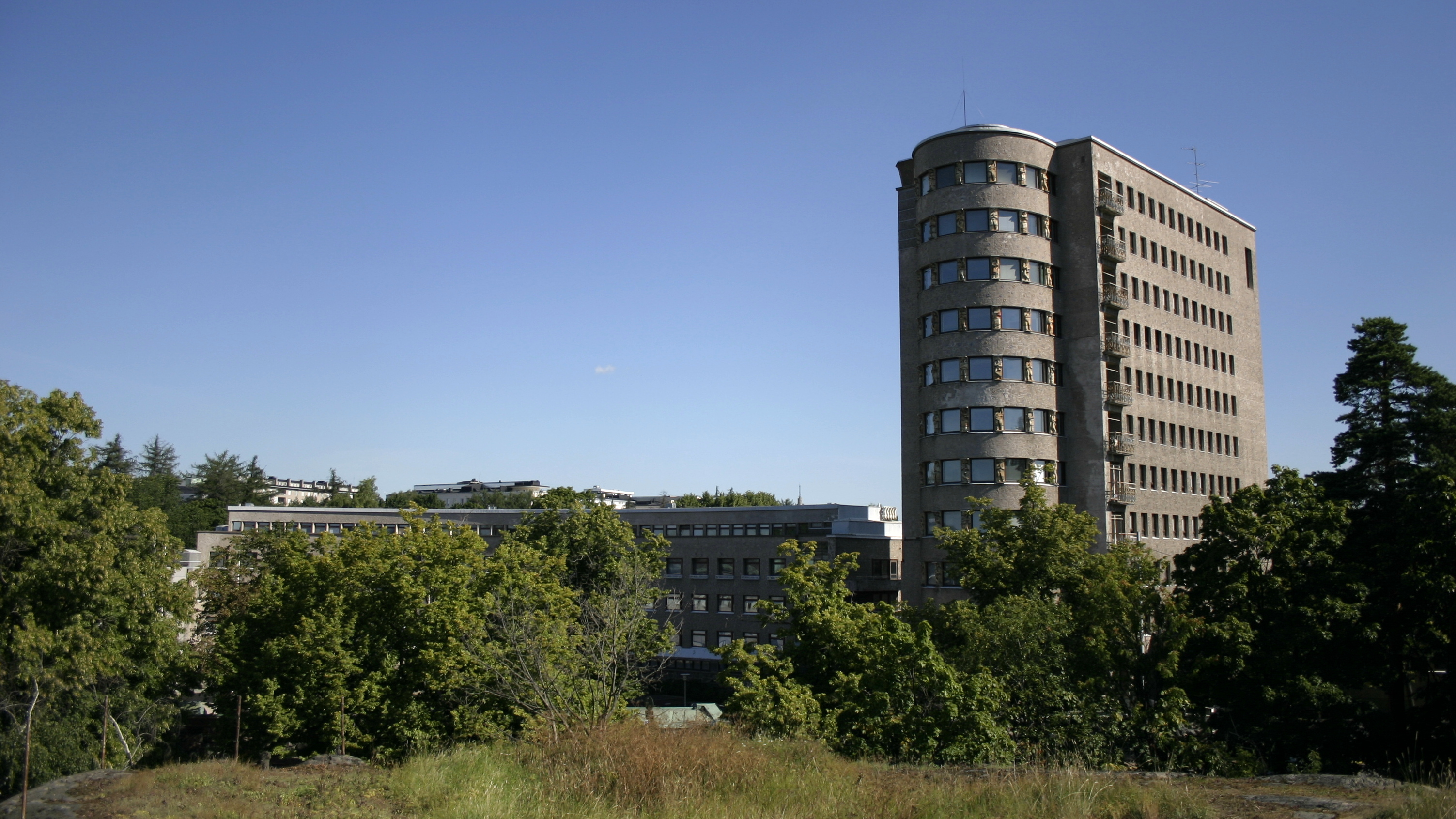
Lastenlinna ("Children's Castle") hospital (1948) by Elsi Borg et al.

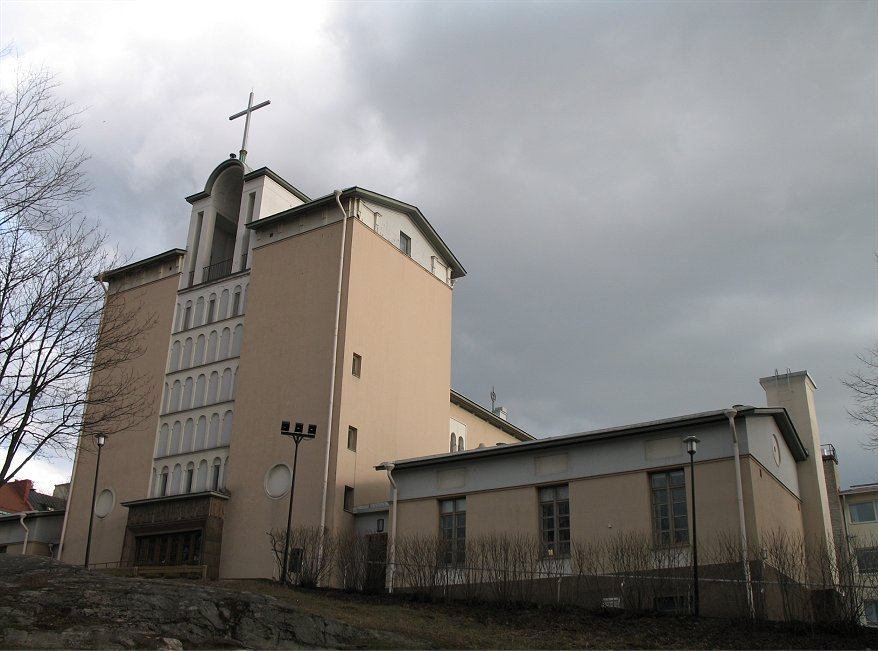
Töölö Church (1930) by Hilding Ekelund.

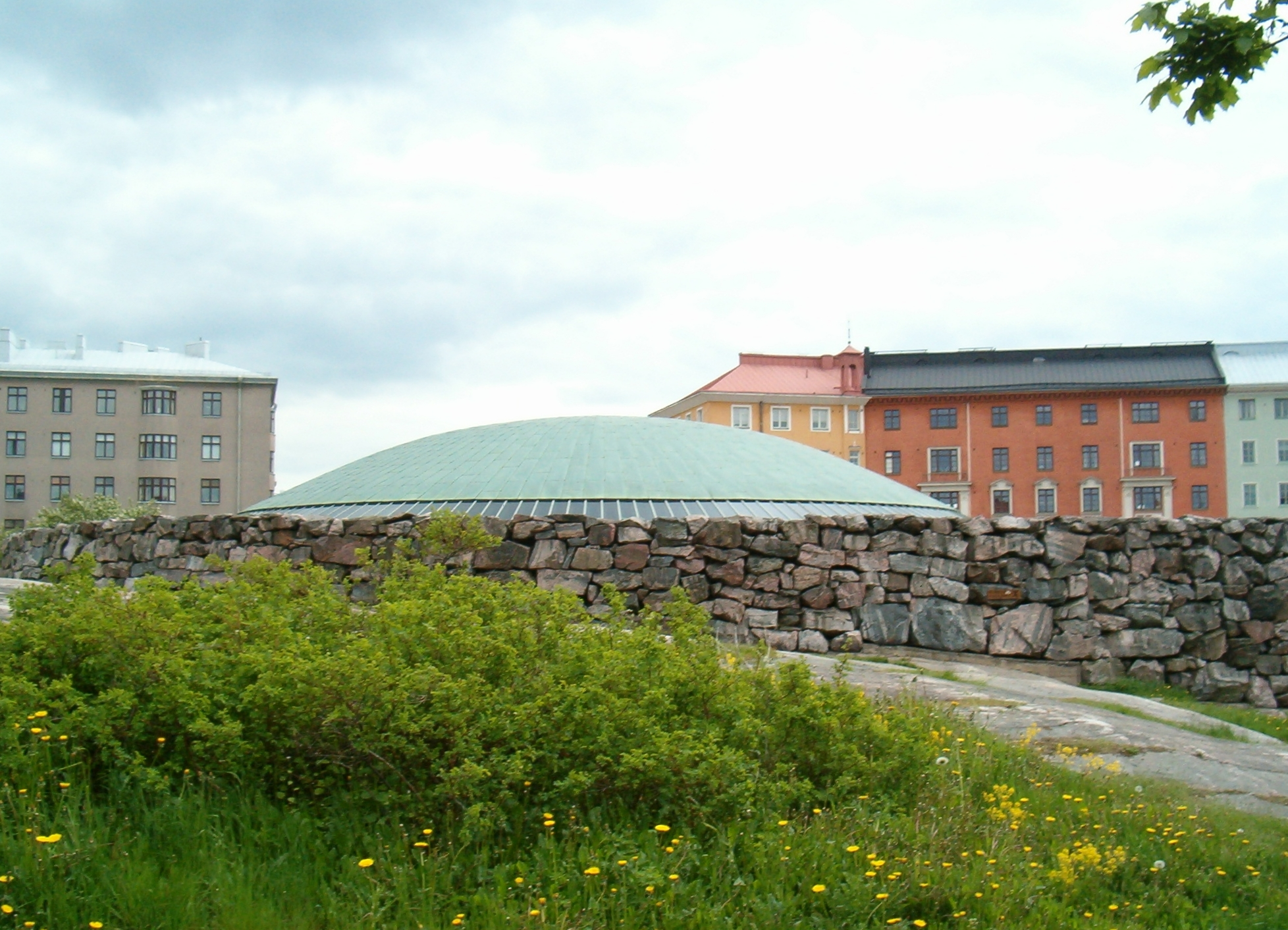
Temppeliaukio Church (1968) by Timo & Tuomo Suomalainen.

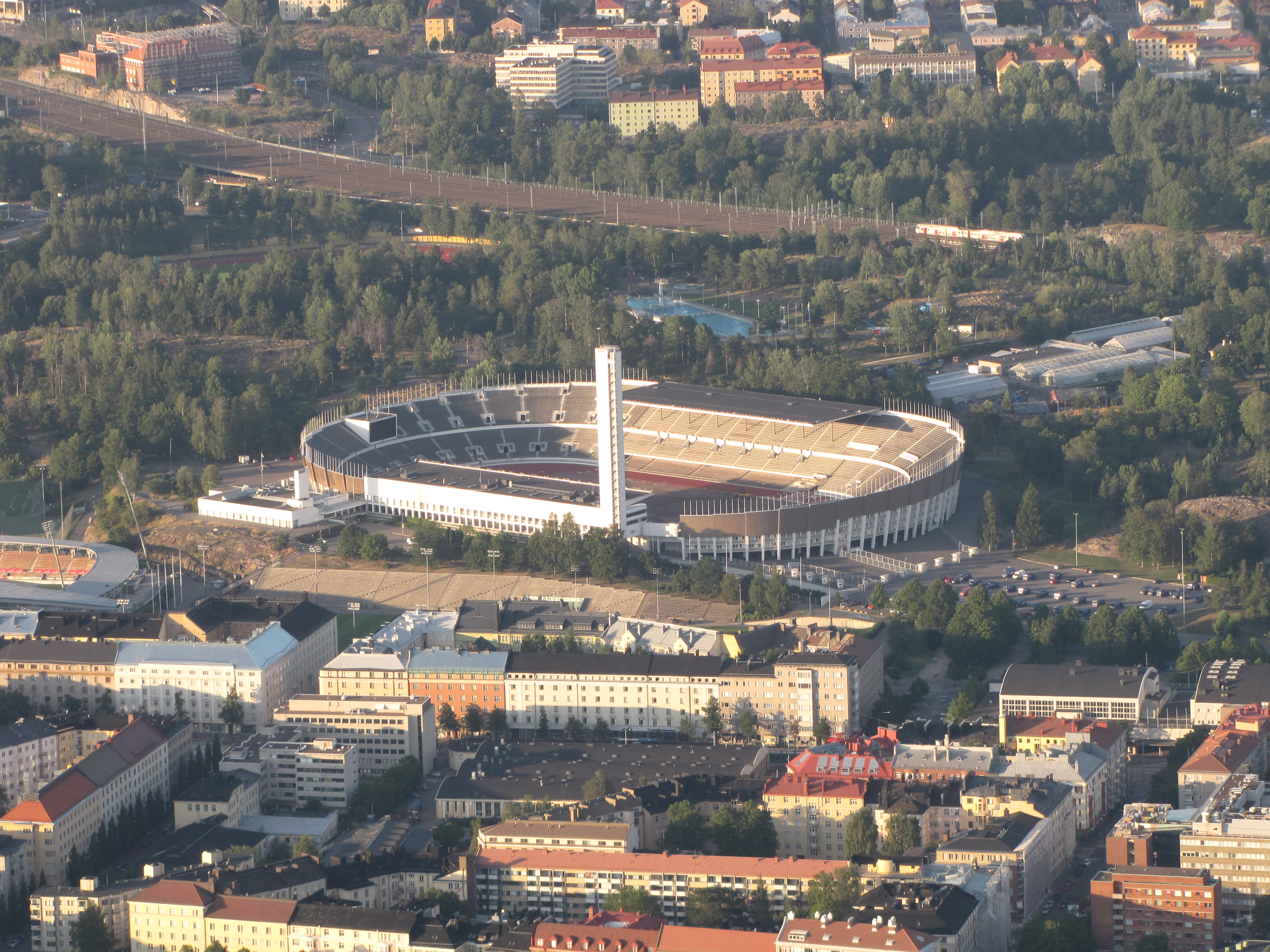
Looking east towards Helsinki Olympic Stadium.

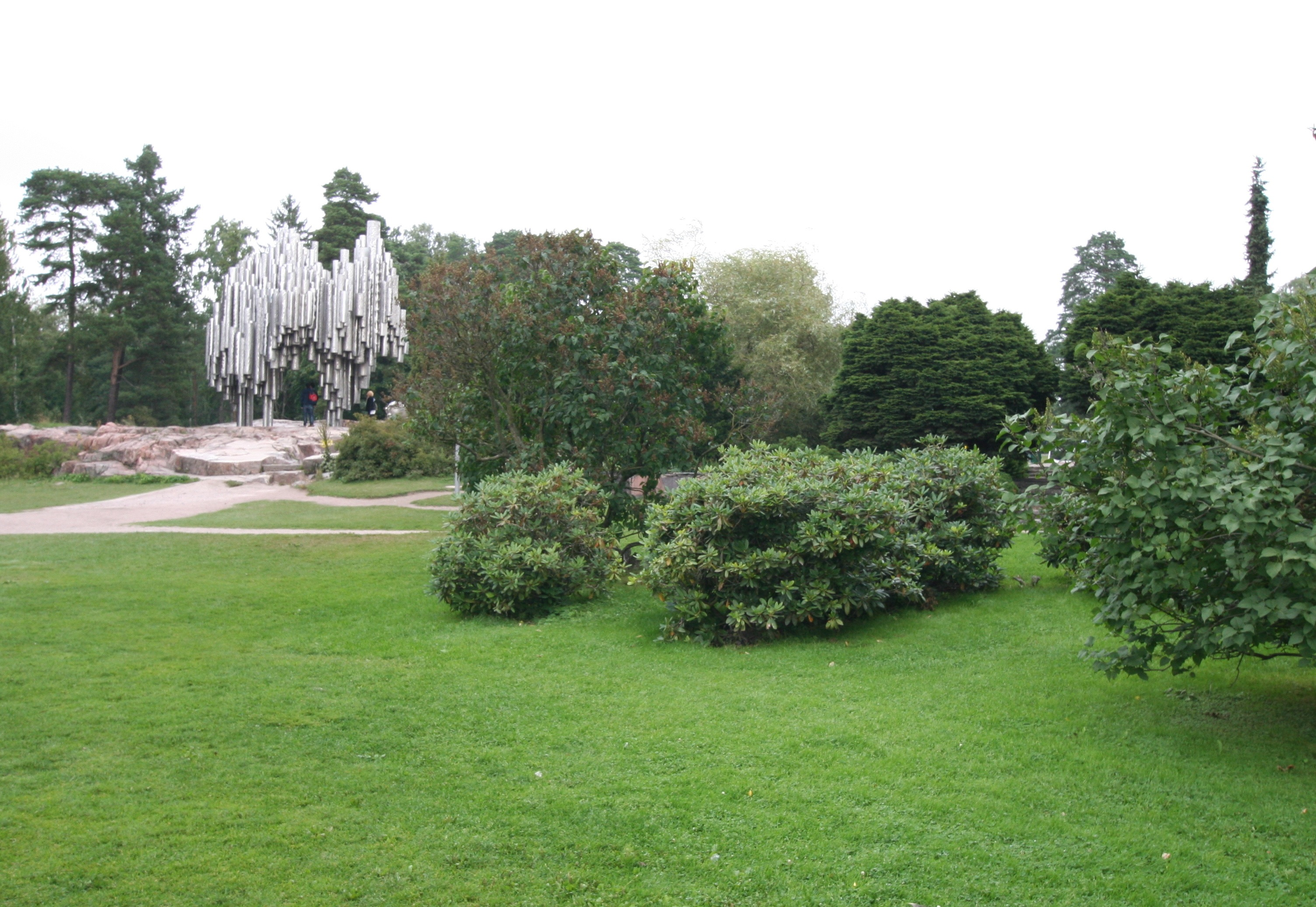
Sibelius Monument (1967) by Eila Hiltunen, in Sibelius Park.

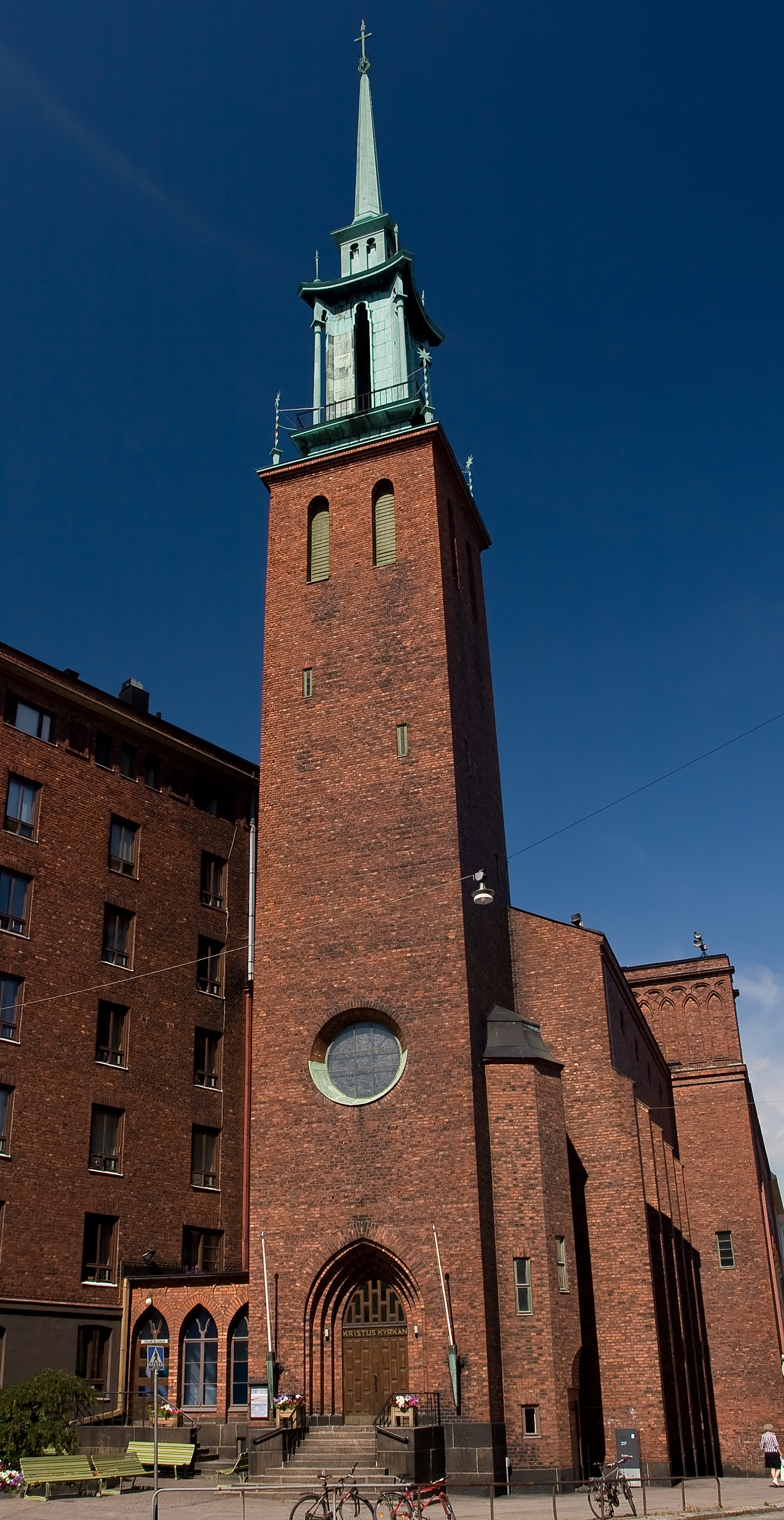
Kristuskyrkan Swedish Methodist church (1928) by Atte V. Willberg.

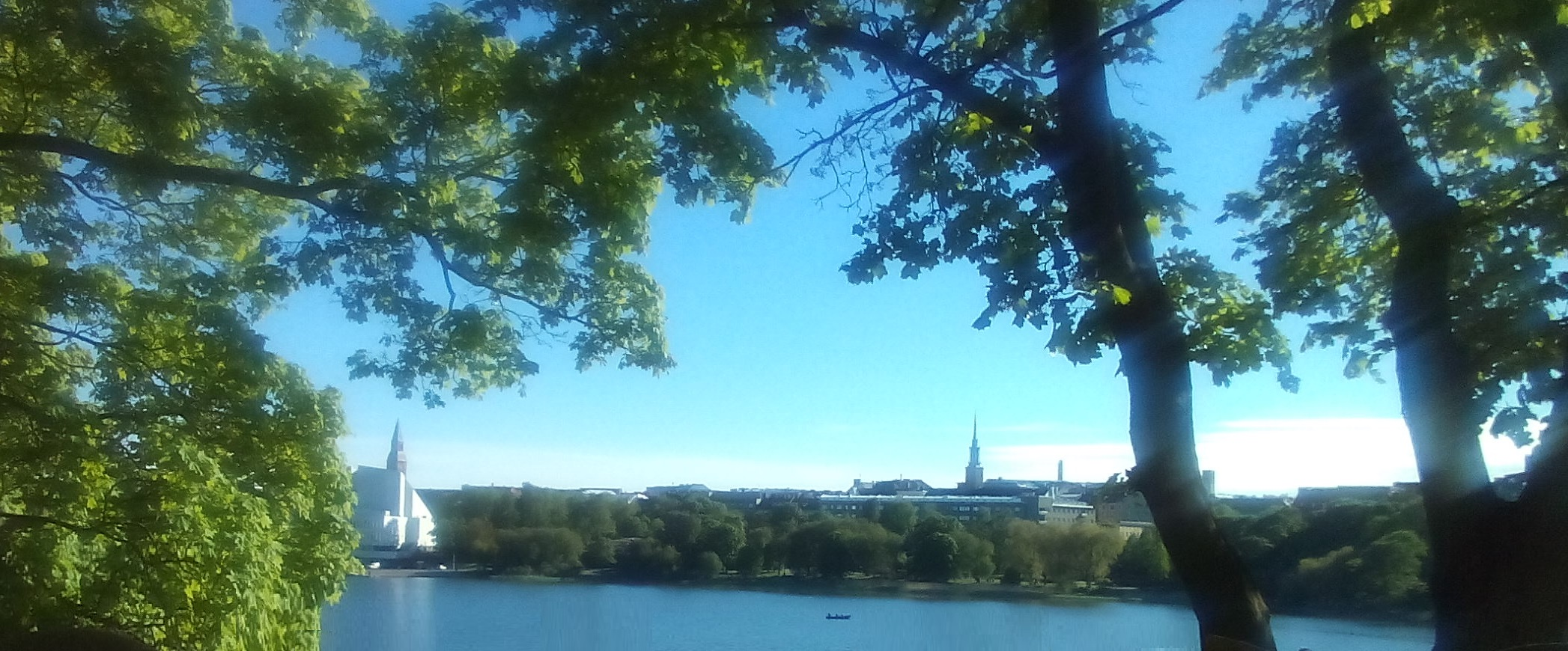
Töölö Bay

Kaksi Karhua Statue, detail. (1921)

Kaksi Karhua (both) (1921)

Media related to Töölö at Wikimedia Commons
