= Allas Sea Pool =

Marine spa in Helsinki, Finland

Coordinates: 60°10′01.58″N 24°57′28.22″E

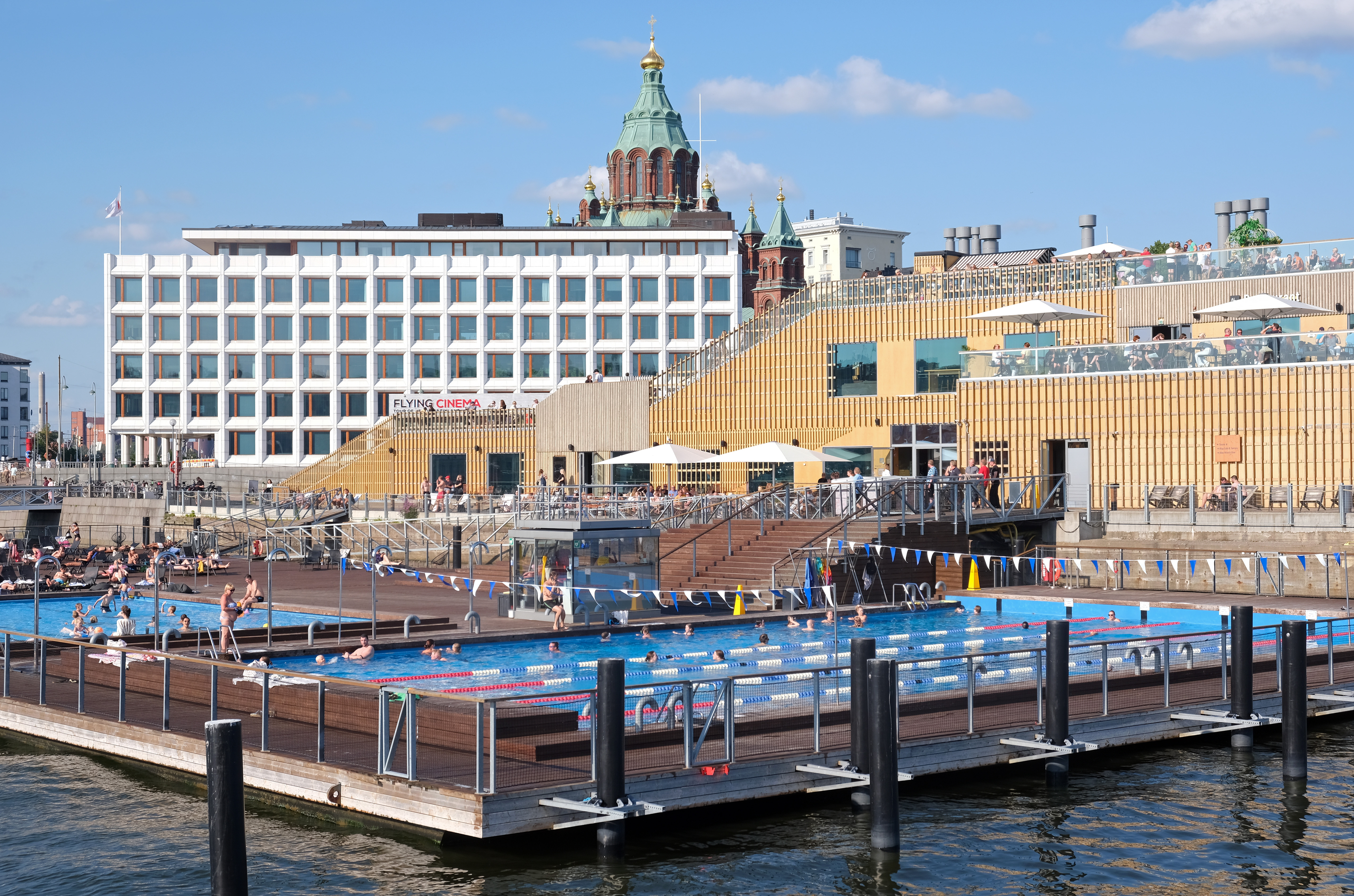
Allas Pool in 2021.

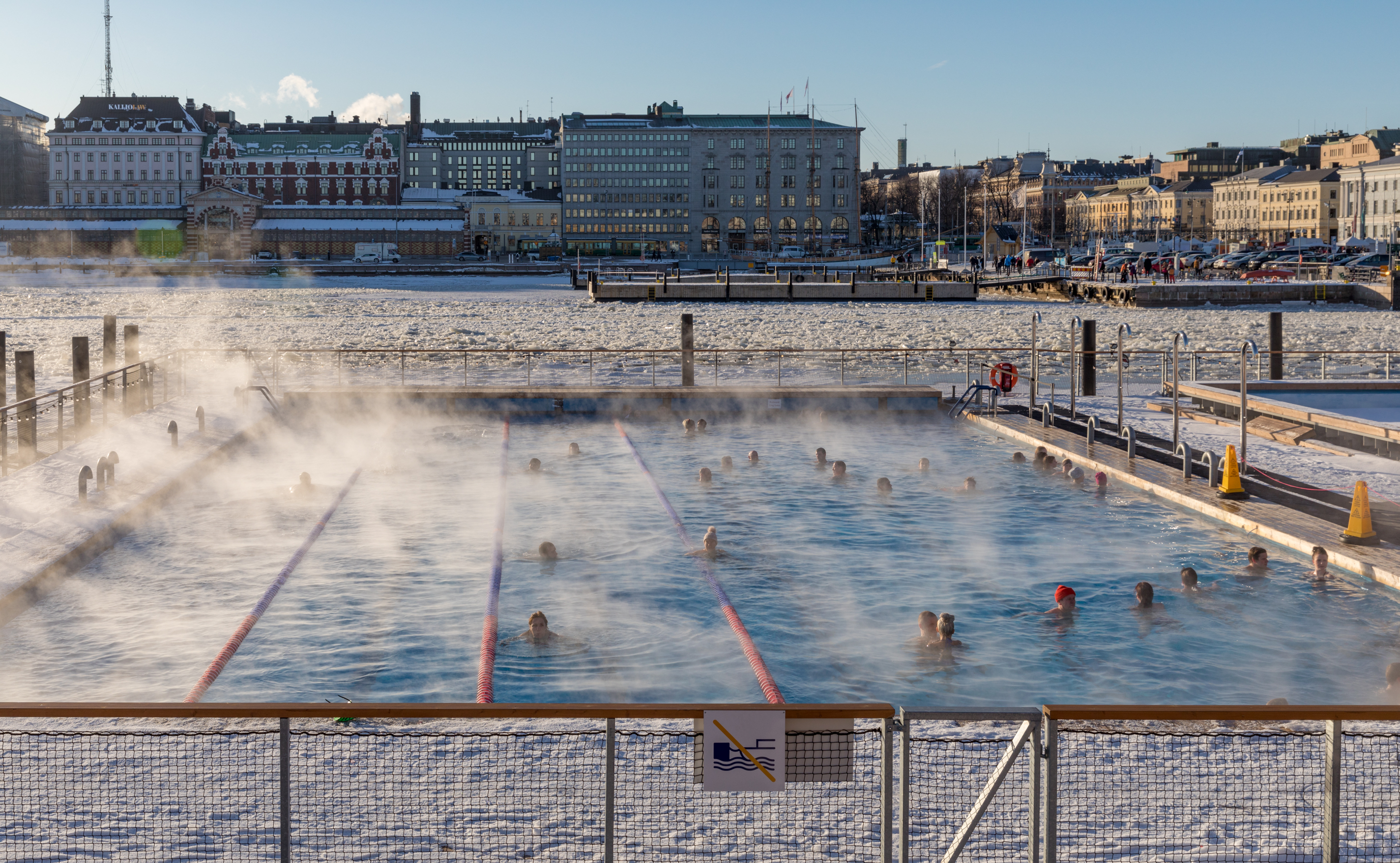
Allas Pool in winter

Allas Pool is a marine spa and lido in Katajanokka, Helsinki, Finland. It was opened on 1 September 2016 on the site of the former Kanavaterminaali building. The spa has three pools built on top of the sea: a children's pool, a warm pool and a seawater pool, as well as a sauna and a café. The main building of Allas Sea Pool was completed in spring 2017. The building has a roof terrace spanning its entire roof. With 1,500 places, Allas Pool is the largest terrace in Helsinki.

The spa is intended to be open all year round.

== History ==
There had been proposals of a spa in Katajanokka to the Finnish Bureau of Sports and Exercise already in 2006. Construction of Allas Sea Pool was given a permit in August 2015. The Ministry for Labour and Entrepreneurship supported the project with 329 thousand euros. The city of Helsinki, Finnvera, and Tekes gave the project a loan of 3 million euro in total. In addition, the project was financed with group funding, which gathered 810 thousand euros. Over 400 people participated in the group funding. One of the pools was built on the Teijo docks of Western Shipyard in Salo, where it was transferred by sea to Katajanokka in a little under one day.

== 2022 accident ==
In mid-January 2022, the pool damaged in Viking Line Gabriella's pier collision.

The target number of visitors in Allas Sea Pool is 320,000 per year. In 2017, the spa reached 142,000 visitors.

== See also ==
- Cafe Regatta
