= Töölö Rowing Stadium =

Rowing and canoeing venue in Helsinki, Finland

Coordinates: 60.1789°N 24.9112°E

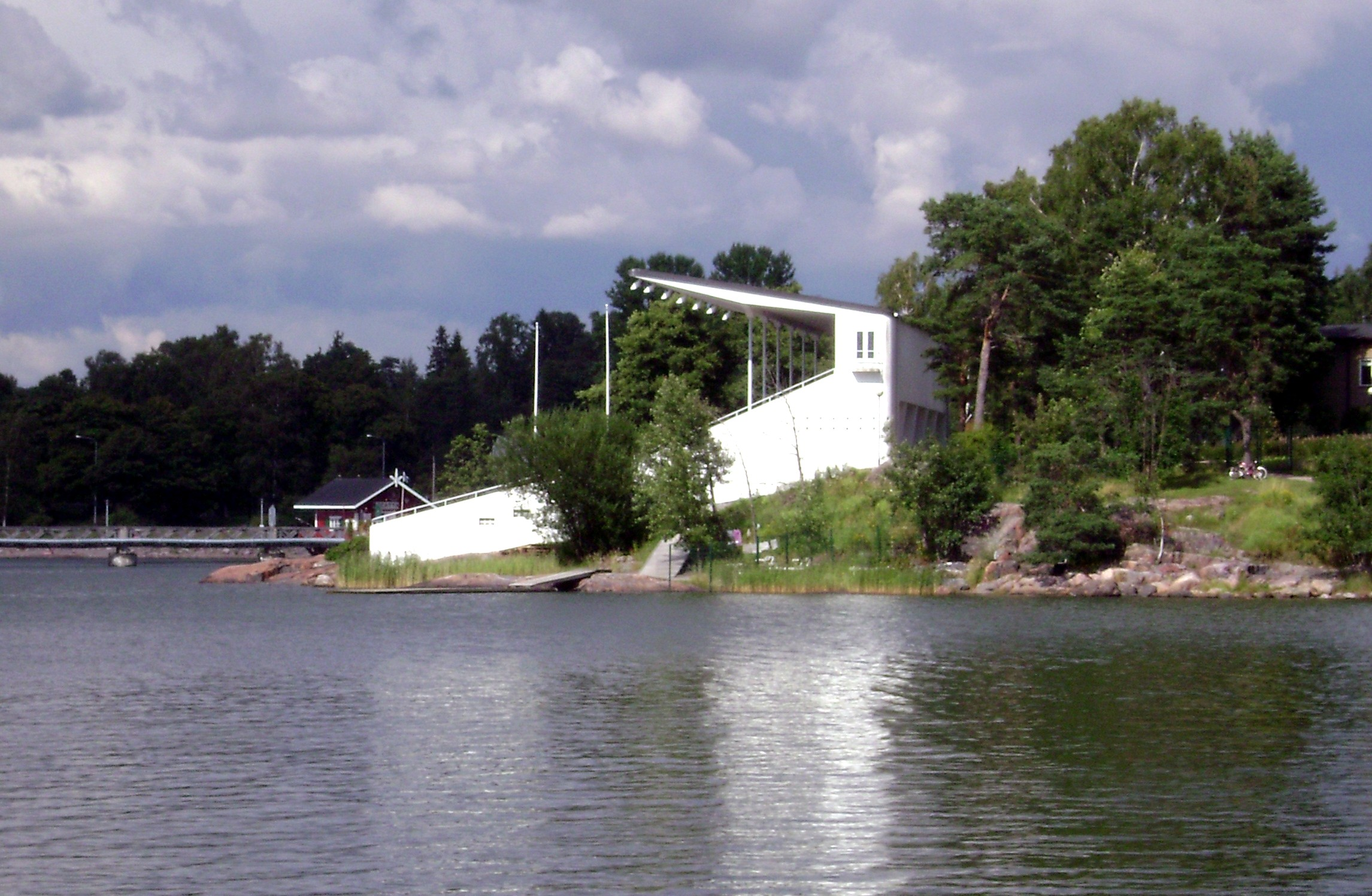
Helsinki Rowing Stadium.

The Töölö Rowing Stadium is a rowing and canoeing venue located a kilometer from Helsinki Olympic Stadium in Helsinki, Finland.

Originally constructed for the 1940 Summer Olympics, that were cancelled in the wake of what became known as World War II, the venue was not approved by the International Rowing Federation (FISA) due to being exposed to sea breezes. As a result, the rowing events were moved to Meilahti while the canoeing events took place as planned.

The Rowing Station is close to Cafe Regatta, where people can rent kayaks, canoes and rowing boats during the summer.
