= Atte Willberg =

Finnish architect

Albert Valdemar (Atte) Willberg (30 December 1884 – 14 February 1935) was a Finnish architect.
