= Robert's Coffee =

Finnish coffee shop chain

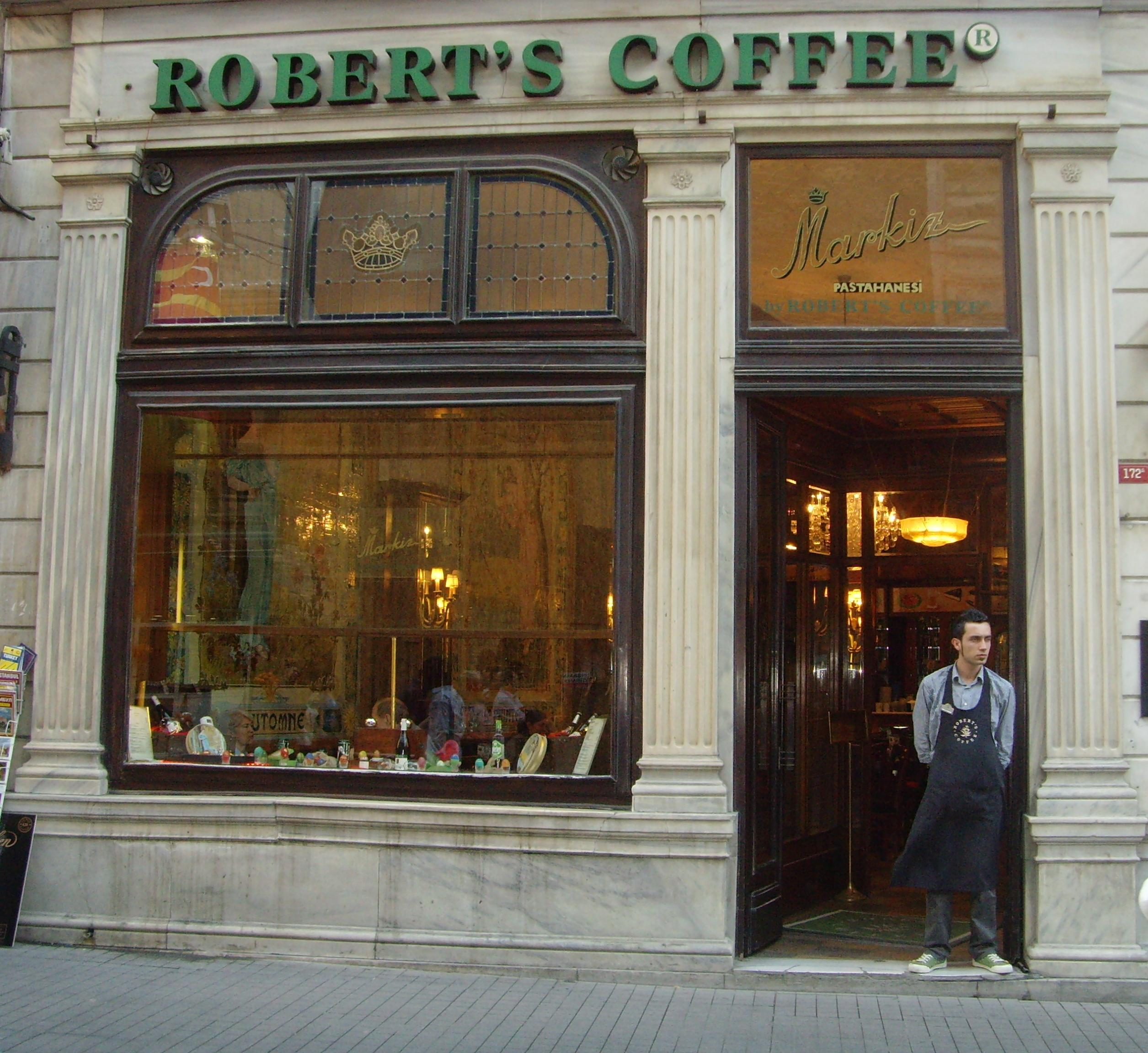
Robert's Coffee on the İstiklal Avenue in Istanbul, Turkey

Robert's Coffee is a Finnish coffee roastery and coffee chain founded in 1987 by Robert Paulig, the former CEO of Paulig. Its selection includes original coffees, coffee blends, espresso coffees, spice coffees, decaffeinated coffee and tea. In 2014, the Paulig Group acquired the roastery and the Robert Paulig trademarks from Robert Paulig after long trademark disputes. The Robert's Coffee chain was not part of the deal and is still owned by the Robert Paulig family.

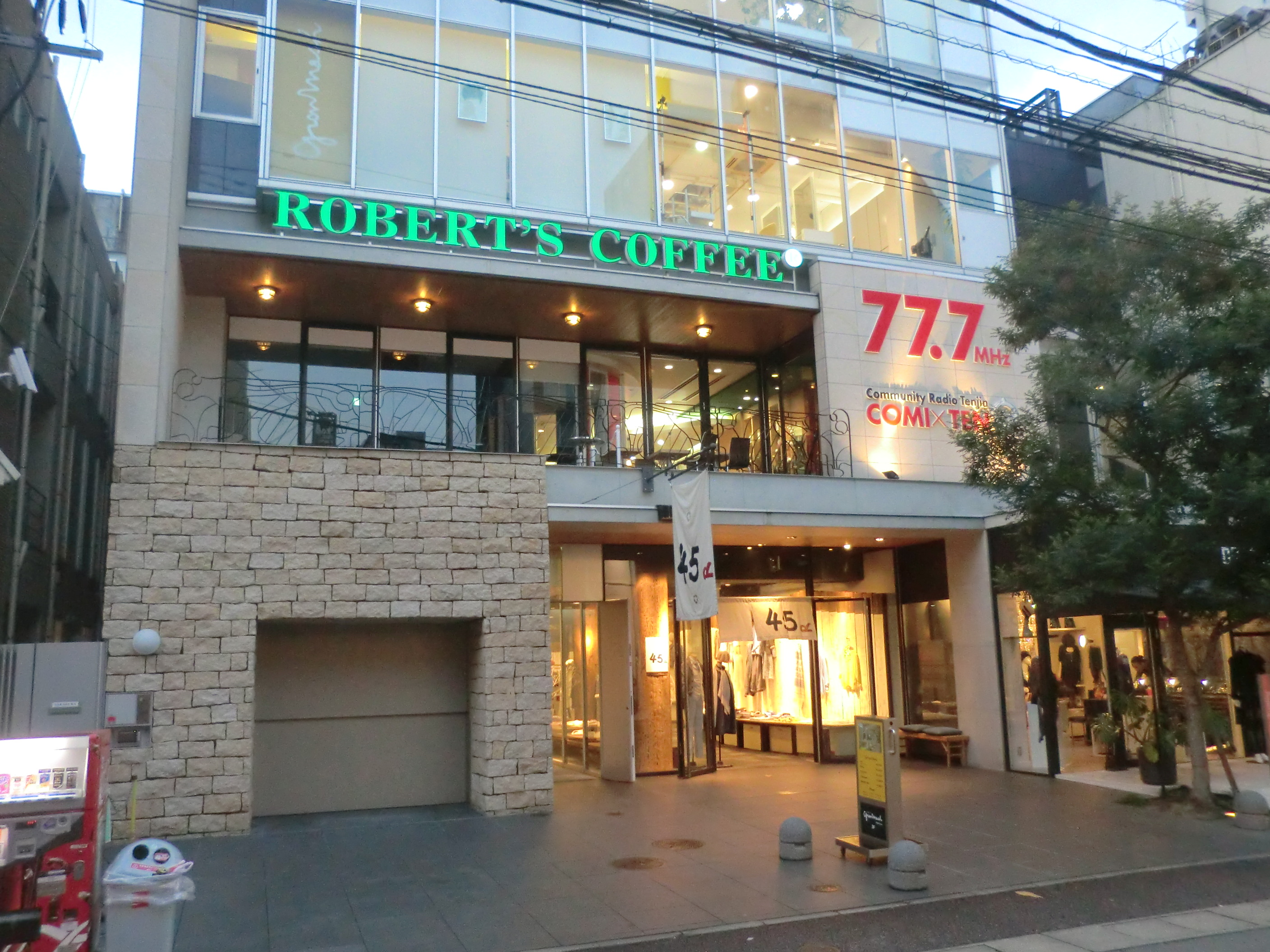
Robert's Coffee in Fukuoka, Japan

According to Robert's Coffee, it is the largest cafe chain in the Nordic countries. It has its own gourmet coffee roastery and its own coffee grades. For example, there are about 100 cafés in Finland, Sweden, Estonia, and even Turkey, Japan, Pakistan and Singapore.

== History ==
Robert's Coffee was founded in 1987 by Robert Paulig, a member of the prominent Paulig coffee family. The decision to establish an independent company stemmed from a dispute within the family's main corporation, Paulig Group. In the 1980s, Robert Paulig's attempt to take the family company public was not supported by other family members, which led to his departure from the company in 1986. A year later, he founded his own gourmet coffee roastery and café chain.

The use of the family name led to a long-running trademark dispute with the Paulig Group, which sued Robert Paulig's companies in 2006 for trademark infringement. In May 2014, the conflict was resolved when the Paulig Group acquired the Robert Paulig roastery business and its coffee trademarks. The Robert's Coffee café chain was not included in the deal and remained a family-owned business, run by Robert Paulig's children.

== See also ==
- Löfbergs
