= Methodism in Finland =

Protestant movement in Finland

Finnish Methodist churches on the map.

Methodism arrived in Finland through Ostrobothnians sailors in the 1860s, and Methodism spread especially in Swedish-speaking Ostrobothnia. The first Methodist congregation was founded in Vaasa in 1881 and the first Finnish-speaking congregation in Pori in 1887.

Since 1925, the Methodists' national churches have been the Finnish United Methodist Church in Finland and the Swedish United Methodist Church in Finland (depending on the language spoken). The Methodist Churches of Finland belong to the World Methodist Council. Both churches are subject to the bishop of the Nordic and Baltic countries. Both Methodist churches also belong to the Finnish Ecumenical Council and the Free Christian Council of Finland. The Finnish Methodist churches officially have around 2,000 members.

== History ==
The first signs of Methodism are from the Vaasa region in the summer of 1859, when Gustaf Lervik, who participated in the revival at the Bethel ship mission in New York, preached in the area. A revival was born from the sermon, but Lervik gave up preaching because of the opposition the movement faced. Gustaf Bärnlund and Wilhelm Bärnlund, who also participated in the Bethel ship, organized revival meetings in Kristinestad from 1866. Methodism actually spread in Swedish-speaking Ostrobothnia when the Swedish Methodist preacher Karl Johan Lindborg started his activities in 1880. The following year, a chapel was consecrated in Kristinestad, which got its own congregation in 1886.

In 1882, Lindborg continued his activities in Kokkola, which got its own congregation in 1883 and a church in 1890. The congregation in Kokkola also led the revival in the surrounding countryside and became the foundation congregation of the Methodist congregations in the Oulu and Jakobstad region. 1904. At the turn of the century, the congregation in Vaasa became the largest and most active congregation in Methodism.
