= Eeva-Kaarina Aronen =

Finnish author and journalist

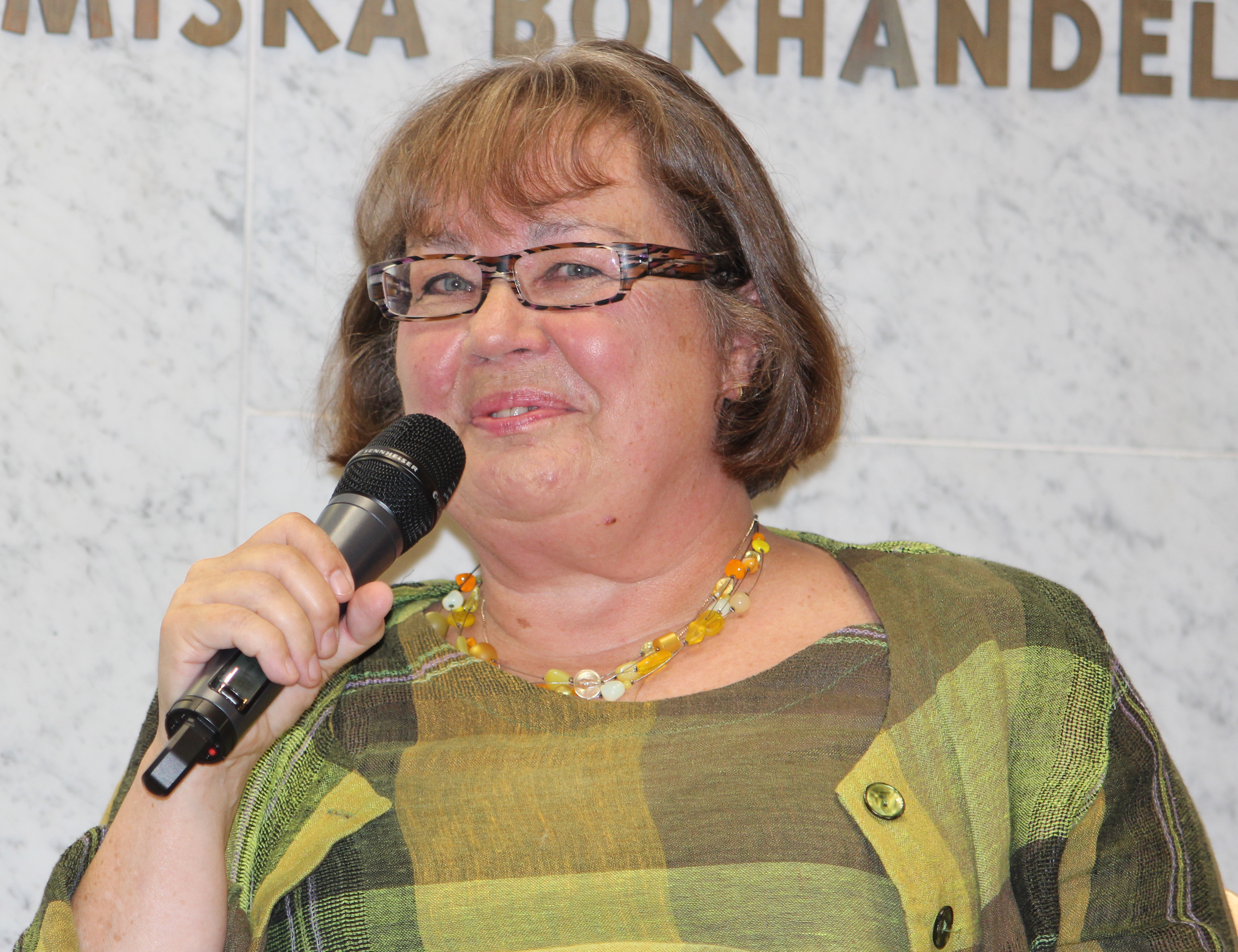
Eeva-Kaarina Aronen, 2014

Eeva-Kaarina Aronen (30 December 1948 - 16 December 2015) was a Finnish author and journalist. Her novels were nominated for the Runeberg Prize and the Finlandia Prize.

== Early life and education ==
Eeva-Kaarina “Epi” Aronen was born in Helsinki on 30 December 1948. She attended school in Töölö, received a bachelor's degree at the Helsingin yliopiston Viikin normaalikoulu in Helsinki in 1968, and graduated from the University of Helsinki in 1975 with a major in Romance philology and Russian Language and Literature. In the following year, she graduated as a journalist from Sanoma's School of Journalism.

== Career ==
Aronen worked as a journalist on Helsingin Sanomat's "Monthly Supplement" from 1991 to 2008.

Aronen's first novel Maria Renforsin totuus ("Maria Renfors Truth") was published in 2005 and the second novel, Hän joka näkee ("She's Seeing") in 2007. Maria Renforsin totuus came out in 2007 in German under the name Die Lachsfischer; it was published by Lübbe and translated by Angela Plöger. Aronen was nominated for the Runeberg Prize in 2007. Hän joka näkee was published in German by Lübbe in August 2008 as a translation by Angela Plöger. Aronen's third novel Kallorumpu ("The Rock Drum") was released in 2011 and was nominated for the Finlandia Prize. Her last novel, Edda, was published in 2014.

She died from cancer in Helsinki on 16 December 2015.

== Awards and honors ==
- 2007, nominated for the Runeberg Prize
- 2011, nominated for the Finlandia Prize

== Selected works ==
- Maria Renforsin totuus (Teos, 2005)
- Hän joka näkee (Teos, 2007)
- Kallorumpu (Teos, 2011)
- Edda (Teos 2014)
