= List of ship decommissionings in 1985 =

The list of ship decommissionings in 1985 includes a chronological list of all ships decommissioned in 1985.

	Operator	Ship	Flag	Class and type	Fate	Other notes
4 January	P&O Normandy Ferries	Tiger	United Kingdom	Ferry	Sold to Townsend Thoresen	Renamed Tiger
5 April	DFDS Seaways	Scandinavia	Bahamas	Cruiseferry	Sold to Sundance Cruises	Renamed Stardancer
12 May	Rederi Ab Sally	Viking Song	Finland	Cruiseferry	Sold to Fred. Olsen Lines	Renamed Braemar
31 May	Royal Navy	Ajax		Leander-class frigate	Decommissioned	Sold for scrap in 1988
25 December	Jakob Lines	Fennia	Finland	Ferry	Sold to Vaasanlaivat-Vasabåtarna	
Date unknown	Black Sea Shipping Company	Alexandr Pushkin	Soviet Union	Ivan Franko-class passenger ship	Transferred to Far Eastern Shipping Company	
Date unknown	Far Eastern Shipping Company	Alexandr Pushkin	Soviet Union	Ivan Franko-class passenger ship	Chartered to CTC Cruises	
Date unknown	Varberg-Grenå Linjen	Europafärjan	Sweden	Ferry	Renamed Europafärjan II	Continued in same traffic
Date unknown	Home Lines	Oceanic	Panama	Cruise ship	Sold to Premier Cruise Line	Renamed StarShip Oceanic

== Bibliography ==
- Friedman, Norman (2006). British Destroyers and Frigates, the Second World War and After. Annapolis, Maryland: Naval Institute Press. ISBN 1-86176-137-6.
