= SF Line =

Finnish shipping company

SF Line was a Finnish shipping company that changed its name to Viking Line in 1995. Originally called Rederi Ab Ålandsfärjan, it was one of three shipping companies that formed the Viking Line marketing organisation in 1966. The other two were Rederi Ab Vikinglinjen and Rederi AB Slite.

Rederi Ab Vikinglinjen left Viking Line in 1988, followed by Rederi AB Slite in 1993. SF Line then became the only remaining company in Viking Line and changed its name to Viking Line in 1995.

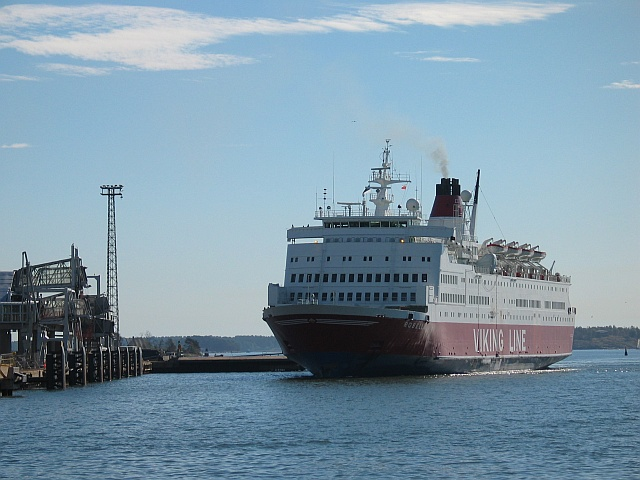
M/S Rosella of Viking Line arriving in Helsinki in summer 2003

== History ==
Rederi Ab Vikinglinjen was founded in 1959 and began ferry services between Gräddö, Sweden, and Korppoo, Finland. The company operated the ro-ro ship Viking, which it bought that year. The ship had previously been named Dinard.

After a disagreement between the founders, Gunnar Eklund and several others left Rederi Ab Vikinglinjen and founded Rederi Ab Ålandsfärjan. The new company bought the steamer Brittany, renamed it Ålandsfärjan, and began operating between Kapellskär, Sweden, and Mariehamn, Åland. The route competed with Rederi Ab Vikinglinjen's services.

In 1966, Rederi Ab Ålandsfärjan, Rederi Ab Vikinglinjen and Rederi AB Slite formed Viking Line as a joint marketing organisation to compete with Silja Line. The three companies then ordered several new ships, and Viking Line increased its ferry services in the Baltic Sea.

In 1970, Rederi Ab Ålandsfärjan changed its name to SF Line. The "S" stood for Sverige (Sweden), and the "F" for Finland. The company's first new ship, MS Kapella, had entered service in 1967. To honour Gunnar Eklund's wife, Ellen, later SF Line ships were given names ending in "-ella".

Also in 1970, Rederi Ab Solstad merged into Rederi Ab Sally. In 1987, EffJohn, the company that owned Silja Line, bought Rederi Ab Sally. SF Line and Rederi AB Slite then continued operating Viking Line without Rederi Ab Sally.

Rederi AB Slite went bankrupt in 1993, so SF Line became the only remaining company in Viking Line. SF Line later changed its name to Viking Line.

== Ships ==
- 1963 SS Ålandsfärjan (sold for scrap in 1972)
- 1967 MS Kapella (sold in 1979, scrapped in 2006)
- 1970 MS Marella (sold in 1980, scrapped in 2004)
- 1973 MS Aurella (sold in 1982, scrapped in 2024)
- 1979 MS Turella (sold in 1988, currently MS Kongshavn for Kystlink)
- 1980 MS Rosella
- 1985 MS Mariella
- 1987 MS Ålandsfärjan (sold in 2008 to G.A.P Adventures, renamed Expedition)
- 1988 MS Amorella
- 1989 MS Isabella (currently MS Isabelle for Tallink)
- 1989 MS Cinderella (renamed MS Viking Cinderella in 2003)
- 1997 MS Gabriella
- 2008 MS Viking XPRS
- 2012 MS Viking Grace
- 2021 MS Viking Glory

== See also ==
- Viking Line
- Rederi Ab Sally
- Rederi AB Slite
- Silja Line
