= MS Viking 1 =

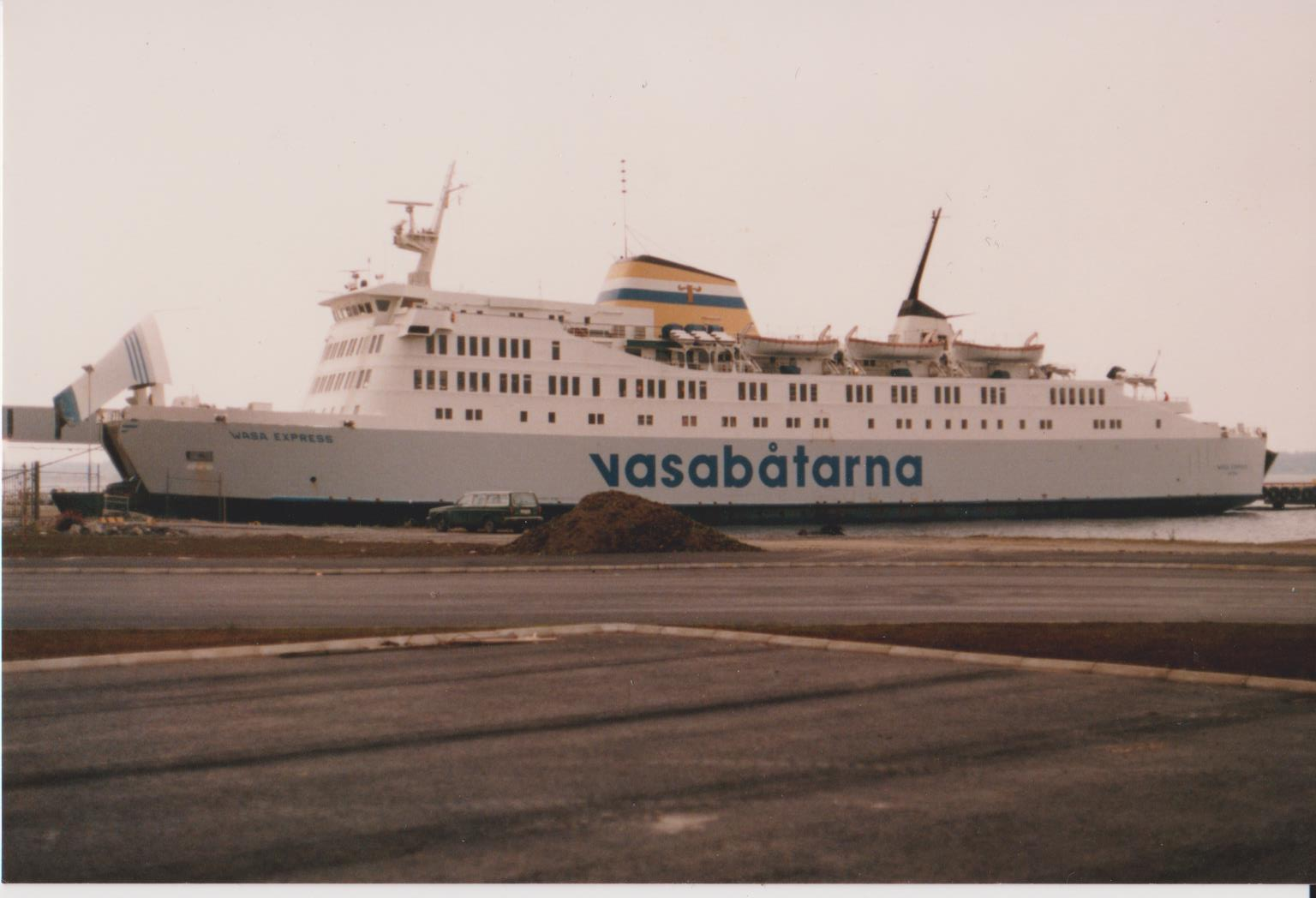
- Viking 1 as Wasa Express at Vaasa in 1983 or 1984

History
- Name: Viking 1
- Operator: Viking Line (1970–1982)
- Route: Naantali — Mariehamn — Kapellskär
- Builder: Meyer Werft, Papenburg, West Germany
- Completed: 1970
- Acquired: 19 August 1970
- Maiden voyage: 1970
- In service: 1970
- Out of service: 2000
- Renamed: Wasa Express; Khalid 1; Mecca 1; Al Hussein II; Al-Quamar Al-Saudi Al-Misri 1; Mecca 1; Al-Quamar Al-Saudi II; Fagr
- Identification: IMO number: 7018599
- Fate: Scrapped, October 2002

General characteristics
- Tonnage: 4,239 GRT
- Length: 108.68 m (356 ft 7 in)
- Beam: 17.24 m (56 ft 7 in)
- Ice class: 1 A
- Propulsion: 5,965 kW (7,999 hp)
- Speed: 18.5 knots (34.3 km/h; 21.3 mph)
- Capacity: 1,200 passengers; 260 vehicles

The MS Viking 1 was a car and passenger ferry delivered to Rederi Ab Sally for use in Viking Line traffic between Naantali, Finland and Kapellskär, Sweden. She operated this route in Viking Line colours between 1970 and 1982.

The Viking 1 was later known by the names Wasa Express, Khalid 1, Mecca 1, Al Hussein II, Al-Quamar Al-Saudi Al-Misri 1, Mecca 1, Al-Quamar Al-Saudi II and Fagr. As the Fagr, the ship capsized in a storm in the Red Sea on 19 April 2000. The wreck was salvaged and scrapped in October 2002.
