= MS Viking 5 =

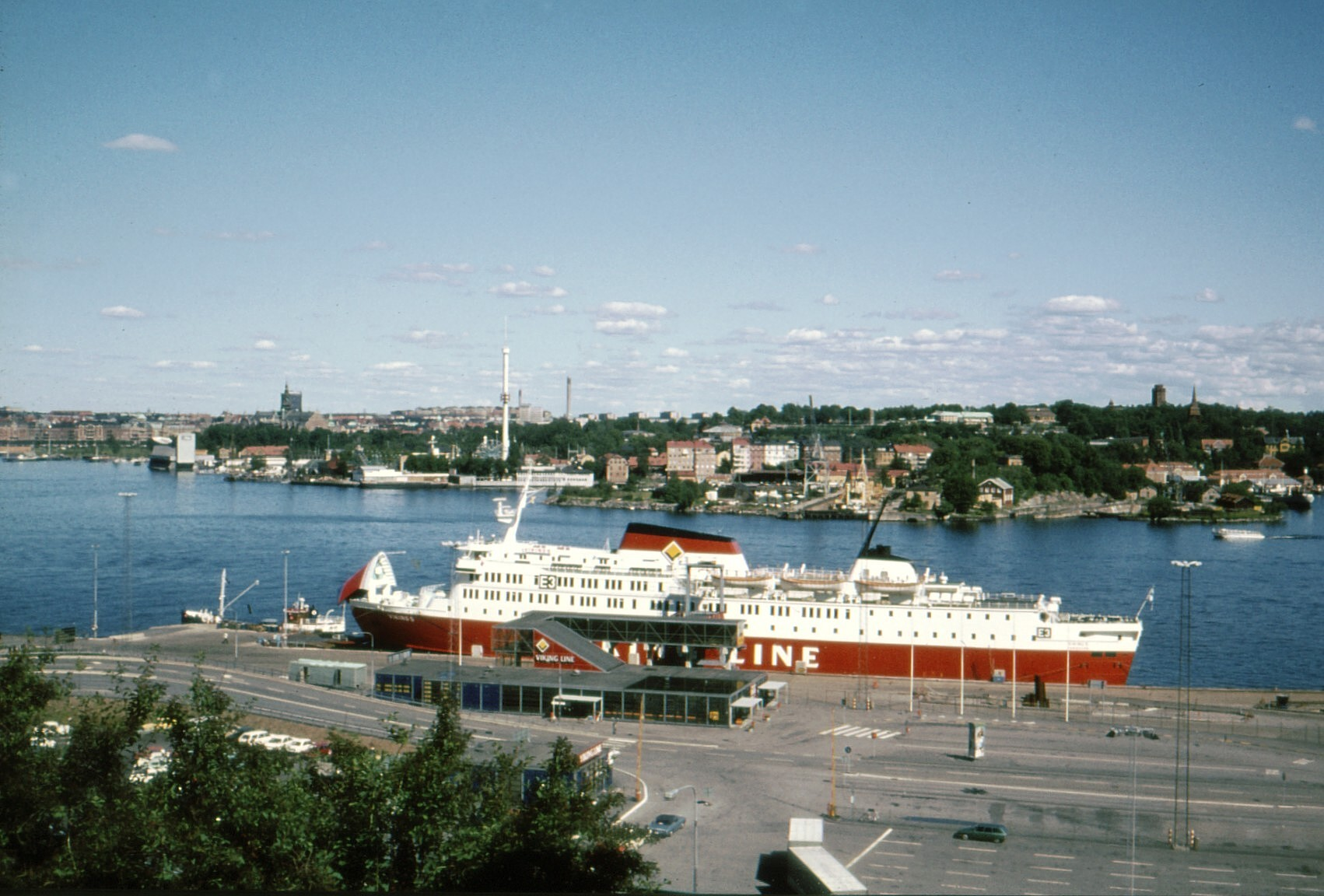
- Viking 5 at Stockholm in 1974.

History
- Name: 1974–1981: Viking 5; 1981–1983: The Viking; 1983–1984: Sally Express; 1984–1988: Bolette; 1988–2015: Boughaz
- Operator: 1974–1981: Viking Line; 1981–1983: Rederi Ab Sally; 1983–1984: Wasa Line; 1984–1988: Fred. Olsen & Co.; 1988–2003: Comarit; 2003–2005: Lineas Maritimas Europeas; 2005–2011: Comarit; 2011–2015: Laid up
- Route: 1974–1980: Helsinki—Stockholm; 1980: Turku — Mariehamn—Stockholm; 1980–1981: Naantali—Mariehamn—Kapellskär; 1981–1983: Ramsgate—Dunkerque; 1983–1984: Vaasa—Sundsvall; 1984–1988: Kristiansand—Hirtshals—Egersund; 1988–2011: Algeciras—Tanger
- Ordered: 8 August 1973
- Builder: Meyer Werft, Papenburg, West Germany
- Completed: 1974
- Acquired: 5 July 1974
- Maiden voyage: 1974
- In service: 1974
- Out of service: 2011
- Identification: IMO number: 7349601
- Fate: Scrapped at Aliağa, Turkey in 2015.

General characteristics
- Tonnage: 5,286 GRT
- Length: 117.79 m (386 ft 5 in)
- Beam: 17.25 m (56 ft 7 in)
- Ice class: 1 A
- Propulsion: 8,120 kW (10,889 hp)
- Speed: 19.5 knots (36.1 km/h; 22.4 mph)
- Capacity: 1,200 passengers; 300 vehicles

The Viking 5 was a car and passenger ferry delivered to Rederi Ab Sally for use in Viking Line traffic between Helsinki, Finland and Stockholm, Sweden. She operated this route in Viking Line colours between 1974 and 1980.

The Viking 5 was later known by the names The Viking, Sally Express, Bolette and Boughaz. The ship was laid up in 2011 and sold for scrap in Aliağa, Turkey in 2015.

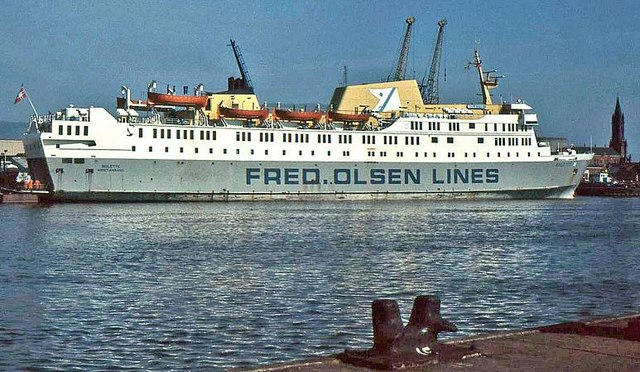
Bolette at Belfast.

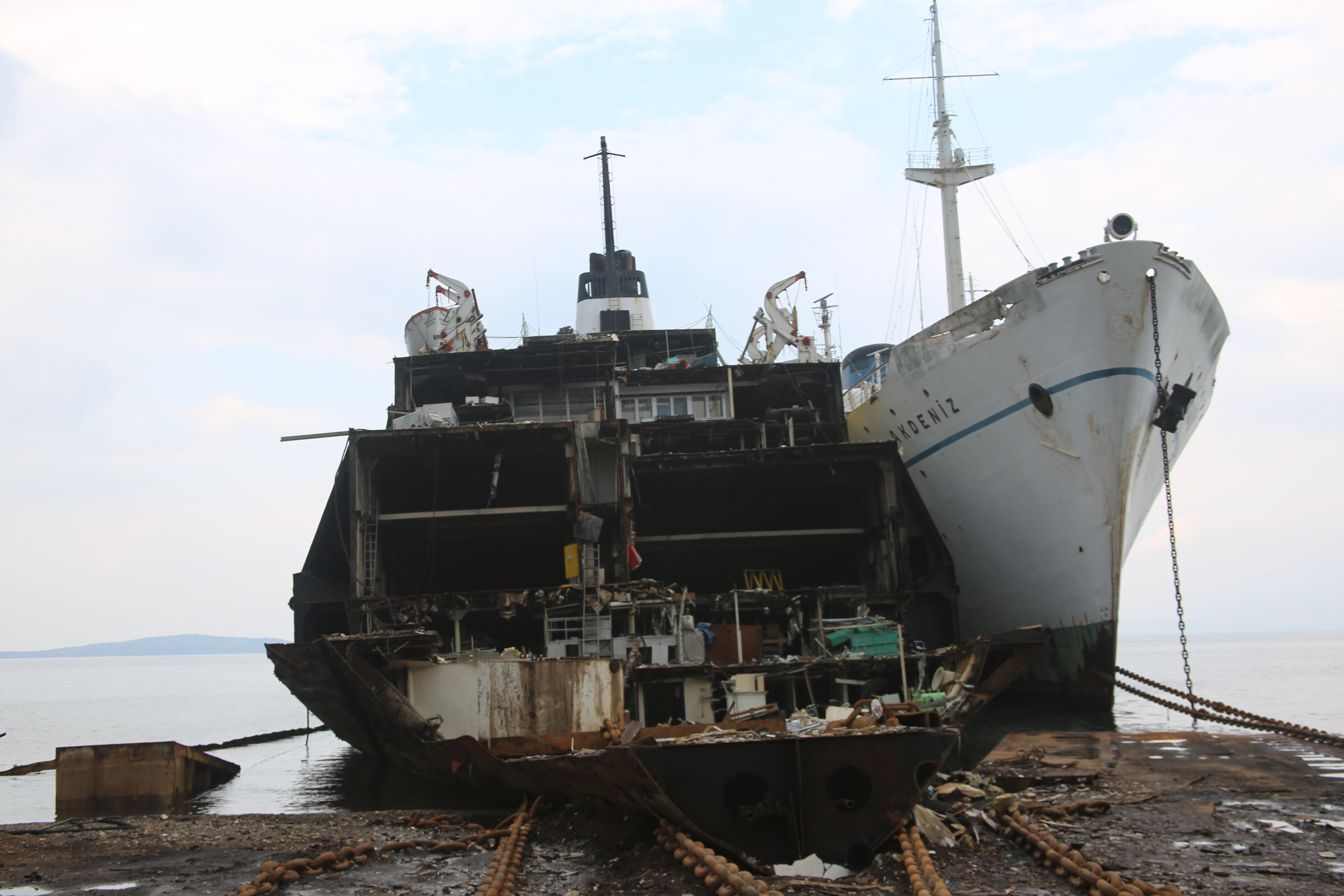
Boughaz (left) and Akdeniz (right) being scrapped at Aliaga in 2015.
