= Viking Line =

Finnish shipping company

Viking Line Abp
- Type: Public
- Traded as: Nasdaq Helsinki: VIK1V
- Industry: Shipping
- Founded: 1959
- Founder: Gunnar Eklund
- Headquarters: Mariehamn, Åland, Finland
- Area served: Northern Europe
- Key people: Jan Hanses (CEO); Andreas Remmer (Executive Vice President)
- Products: Ferries, port services, passenger transportation, freight transportation, holidays, business travel
- Revenue: ▲480.9 million euros (2025)
- Operating income: ▼21.1 million euros (2025)
- Net income: ▲16.0 million euros (2025)
- Number of employees: 2,441 (2025)
- Website: www.vikingline.com
- Footnotes House flag of Viking Line

Viking Line Abp is an Åland-based shipping company that operates a fleet of ferries and cruiseferries between Åland, mainland Finland, Sweden and Estonia. The company is headquartered in Mariehamn, Åland, and Viking Line shares are quoted on the Helsinki Stock Exchange. Viking Line currently operates five ferries, of which four serve routes to Stockholm and one operates to Tallinn.

The activities of Viking Line include route trips, cruises and cargo traffic. In 2025, Viking Line employed an average of 2,441 people both on land and on sea.

== Company history ==
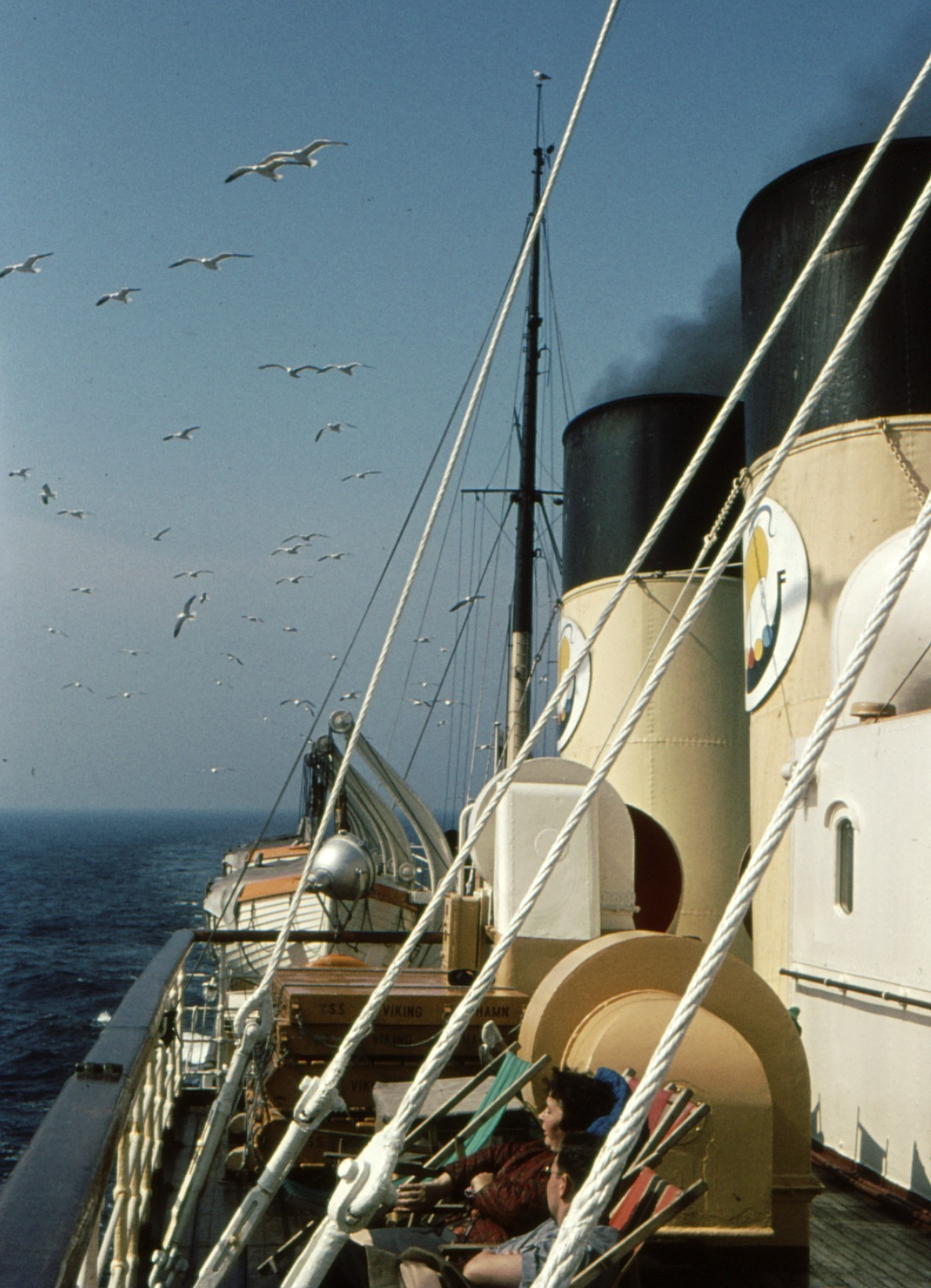
Sun deck of the original SS Viking, photographed in 1963

=== Early years: 1959–1966 ===
Viking Line's history dates back to 1959, when a group of maritime professionals and businessmen from the Åland Islands founded Rederi Ab Vikinglinjen. The company purchased the steam-powered car ferry SS Dinard from the United Kingdom, renamed her SS Viking, and began service on the Korpo (Finland)–Mariehamn (Åland)–Gräddö (Sweden) route. That same year, the Gotland-based Rederi AB Slite launched a competing service between Simpnäs (Sweden) and Mariehamn.

In 1962, internal disagreements led a group of shareholders to leave Rederi Ab Vikinglinjen and establish Rederi Ab Ålandsfärjan, which began operating a Gräddö–Mariehamn route the following year.

As competition intensified, the three companies realized that continued rivalry would be unsustainable. In 1965, Vikinglinjen and Slite began cooperating, and in late July 1966 Viking Line was established as a joint marketing company for all three operators. To avoid confusion with the new brand, Rederi Ab Vikinglinjen changed its name to Rederi Ab Solstad. The red hull livery was adopted from Slite's Ålandspilen service (to which it had been taken from the colour of the chairman's wife's lipstick!). In 1967 Rederi Ab Ålandsfärjan changed its name to SF Line and in 1977 Rederi Ab Solstad was merged into its mother company Rederi Ab Sally.

=== 1967–1985 ===
During this period, Viking Line functioned solely as a marketing company. Each owner retained control of its own fleet and routes, although schedules were coordinated. The ships were easily distinguished by naming conventions: Sally vessels carried the prefix Viking, Slite ships were named after figures from Roman and Greek mythology, and SF Line vessels ended with the suffix -ella, honoring managing director Gunnar Eklund's wife, Ellen.

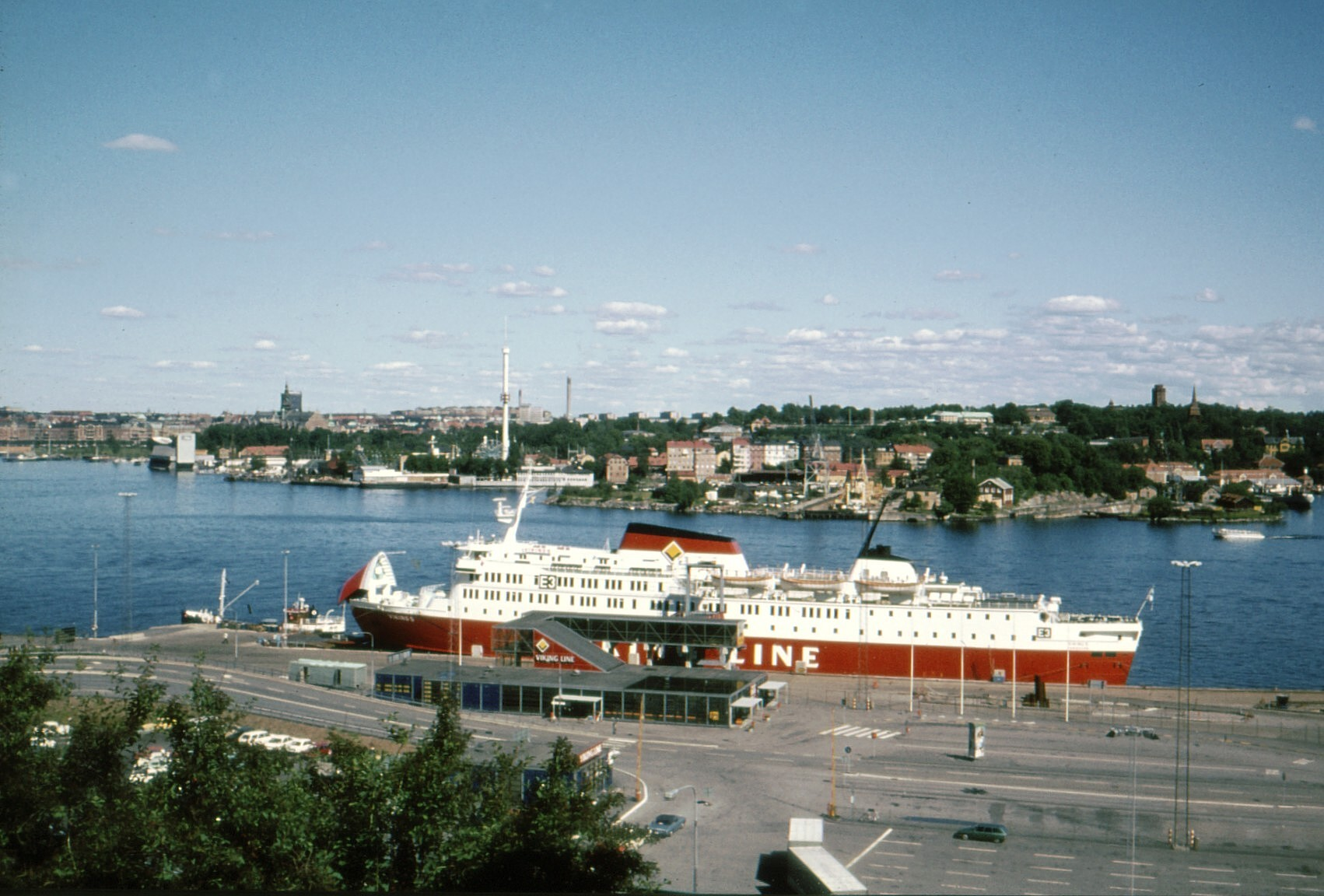
MS Viking 5, built 1974 for Rederi Ab Sally, in Stockholm during her first year of service

During the 1970s Viking expanded greatly and overtook Silja Line as the largest shipping consortium on the Northern Baltic Sea. Between 1970 and 1973 Slite and Sally took delivery of five nearly identical ships built at Meyer Werft Germany, namely MS Apollo and MS Diana for Slite, and MS Viking 1, MS Viking 3 and MS Viking 4 for Sally. MS Viking 5, delivered in 1974, was an enlarged version of the same design. These so-called Papenburg sisters can be considered to be one of the most successful ships designs of all times (the shipyard built three additional sisters of the original design for Transbordadores for ship services in Mexico: Coromuel, Puerto Vallarta and Azteca). In 1973 Viking Line started service on the Turku–Mariehamn–Stockholm route, directly competing with Silja Line for the first time. The next year Sally began Viking Line traffic between Helsinki and Stockholm. For the next decade this route stayed in their hands, whereas on other routes the three companies operated together.

By the latter half of the 1970s, Sally was clearly the dominant partner in the consortium. In 1980 they took delivery of three new ferries (MS Viking Saga, MS Viking Sally and MS Viking Song), largest to have sailed under Viking's colours. This further established their dominance over the other partners, although SF Line did take delivery of the new MS Turella and MS Rosella in 1979–80 and Slite MS Diana II in 1979. In the early 1980s Sally started expanding their operations to other waters, which became the company's failing as those operations were largely unprofitable and ultimately made Sally unable to invest on new tonnage for Viking Line service.

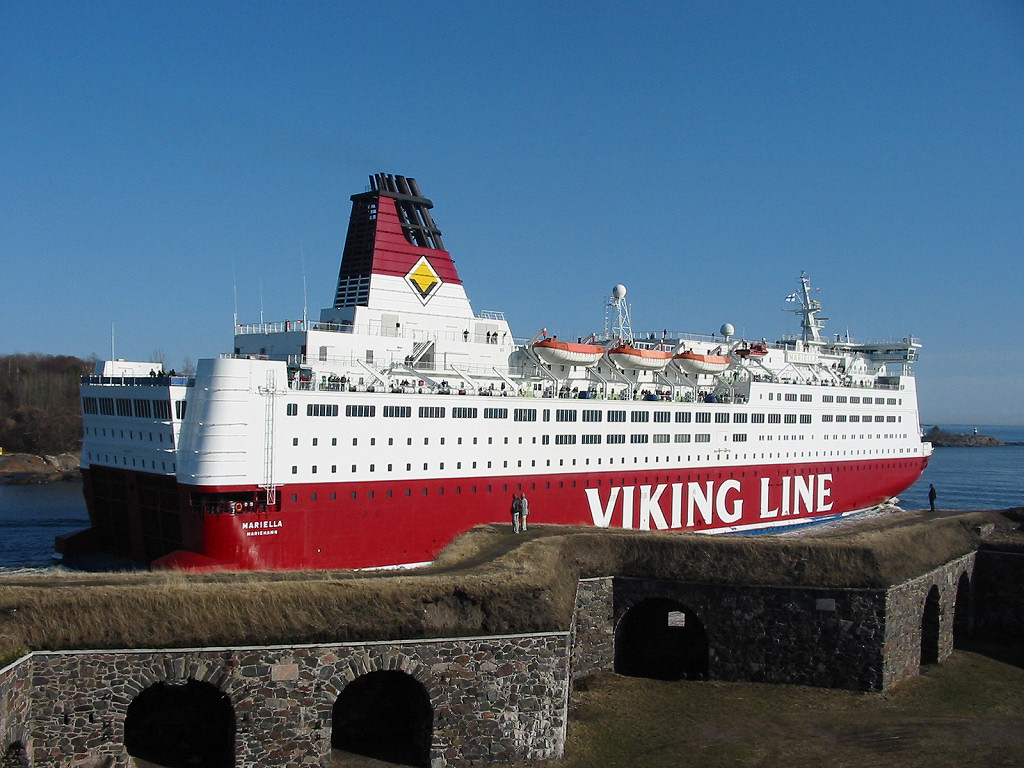
MS Mariella, the world's largest cruiseferry 1985–89, at Kustaanmiekka strait, Helsinki

=== 1985–1993 ===
A turning point came in 1985 when SF Line introduced MS Mariella, then the largest cruiseferry in the world, on the Helsinki–Stockholm route. This ended Sally's monopoly on the service. The following year, Slite introduced MS Olympia, forcing Sally out of the route entirely. While SF Line and Slite were planning additional newbuilds, Sally were in an extremely poor position financially and in 1987 Effoa and Johnson Line, the owners of Silja Line, purchased Sally. As a result, SF Line and Slite forced Sally to leave the Viking Line consortium.

Between 1988 and 1990 SF Line took delivery of three new ships (MS Amorella, MS Isabella and MS Cinderella) while Slite took delivery of two (MS Athena and MS Kalypso).Unfortunately Wärtsilä Marine, the shipyard building one of SF Line's newbuilds and both of Slite's, went bankrupt in 1989. SF Line avoided financial repercussions, their Cinderella had been continuously paid for as her construction progressed. Hence it was SF Line who owned the almost completed ship when the shipyard went bankrupt. Slite however had signed a more traditional type of contract, the Kalypso was to be paid for on delivery. Since the shipyard owned the unfinished ship, this led to an increased cost for the Kalypso—about 200 million SEK more than had been originally envisaged. In the end, despite the financial problems, by 1990 Viking Line had the largest and newest cruiseferry fleet in the world.

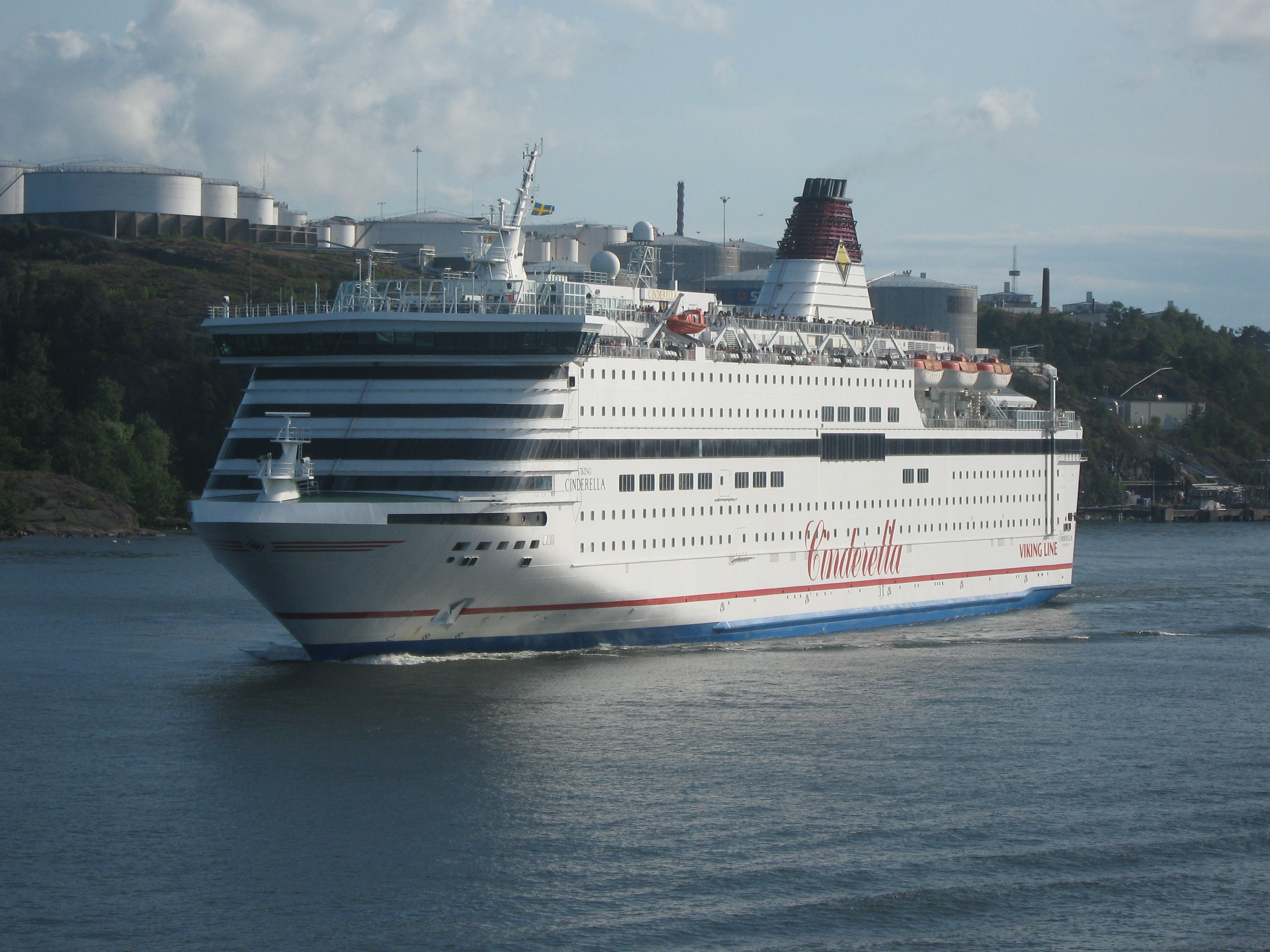
MS Cinderella was the largest cruiseferry in the world when delivered in 1989. In 2003 she was renamed MS Viking Cinderella and given the white livery displayed here.

In 1989 Slite started planning MS Europa, which was to be the jewel in the company's crown, the largest and most luxurious cruiseferry in the world. Unfortunately for them Sweden entered a financial crisis during the construction of the ship, which led to devaluation of the Swedish krona. This in turn meant that the cost for the Europa increased by 400 million SEK. When time came to take delivery of the new ship, Slite did not have the funds to pay for it and their main funders (Swedish Nordbanken, who were also the main funders of Silja Line) refused to loan them the money needed. Eventually the ship ended up in Silja Line's fleet and Slite was forced to declare bankruptcy in 1993.

=== 1993–2010 ===
Following the bankruptcy of Rederi AB Slite, SF Line was left as the sole operator under the Viking Line brand. The remaining two Slite ships, Athena and Kalypso were auctioned in August 1993. SF Line made a bid for the Kalypso, but both ships ended up sold to the newly established Malaysian cruise ship operator Star Cruises. In 1995 SF Line changed their name into Viking Line.

Overview illustration of the M/S Gabriella.

The M/S Gabriella leaving Helsinki towards Stockholm in July 2022.

Between 1994 and 1996 the company operated a fast ferry service from Helsinki to Tallinn during the summers on chartered catamaran ships. In 1997 they purchased MS Silja Scandinavia from Sea-Link Shipping AB and renamed her MS Gabriella for Helsinki–Stockholm service. It has been reported that around the same time plans were made to construct a pair of new ships for the Helsinki–Stockholm service so that Viking could better compete with Silja on that route, but the plans were shelved.

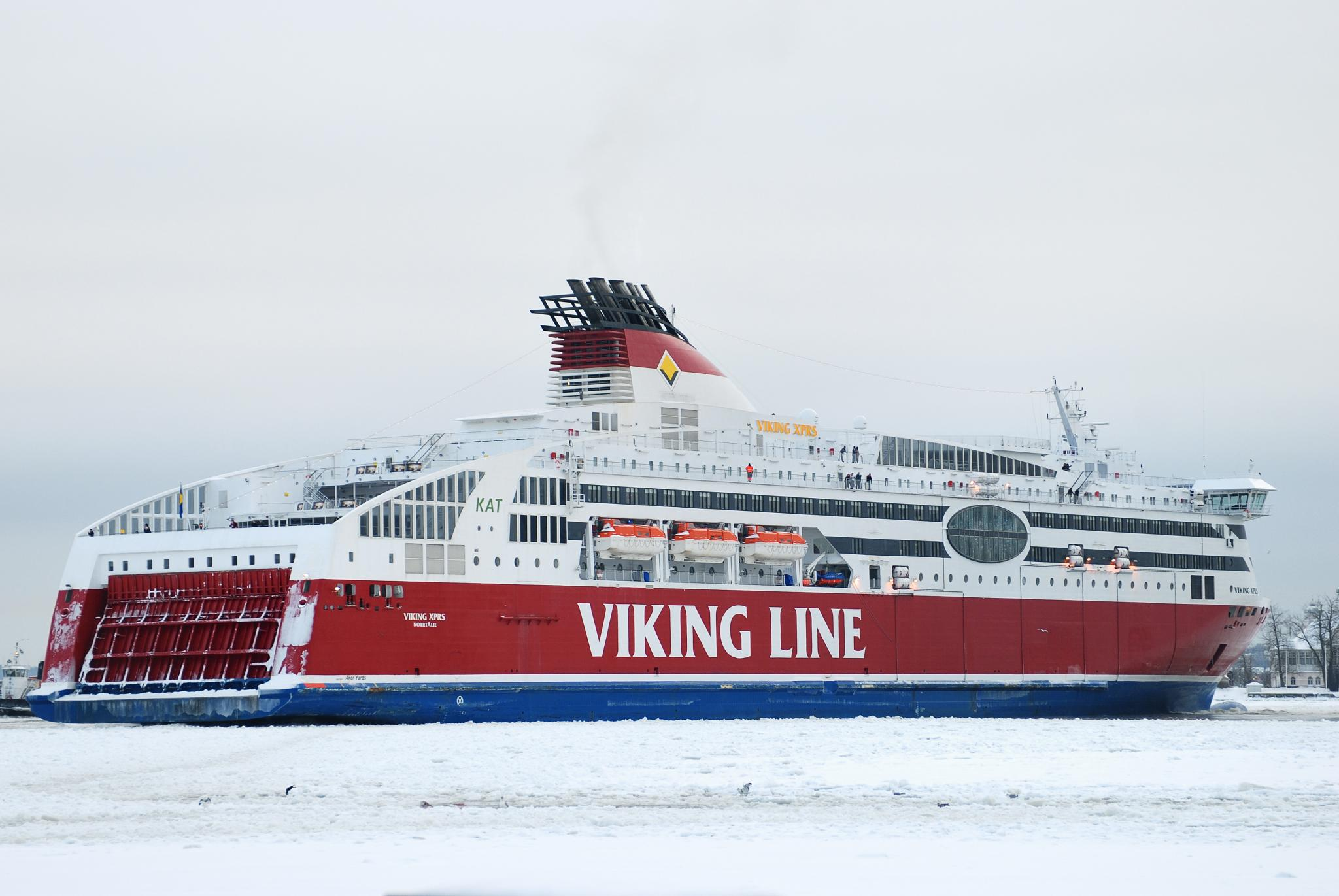

In 2006 Sea Containers Ltd—that had become the main owner of Silja Line in 1999—placed Silja Line and their cargo-carrying subsidiary SeaWind Line for sale, except for GTS Finnjet and MS Silja Opera that were transferred under Sea Container's direct ownership and eventually sold. Viking Line placed a bid for their main competitor, but were outbid by the Estonian Tallink.

The first new ship built for Viking Line since Slite's MS Kalypso in 1990, MS Viking XPRS, had been ordered from Aker Finnyards in 2005, in response to growing competition from Tallink on the Helsinki–Tallinn route. The Viking XPRS eventually entered service for Viking in April 2008. A second new ship was ordered in January 2007, when Viking Line announced that they had placed an order for a 15,000 GT ferry at the Spanish shipyard Astilleros de Sevilla. The project name for the ship, that would have replaced the MS Rosella on the Mariehamn–Kapellskär route, was Viking ADCC. Her delivery was originally expected for March 2009, but after delivery of the ship had been delayed multiple times, on 8 February 2010 Viking Line decided to cancel the contract altogether.

=== 2010–present ===
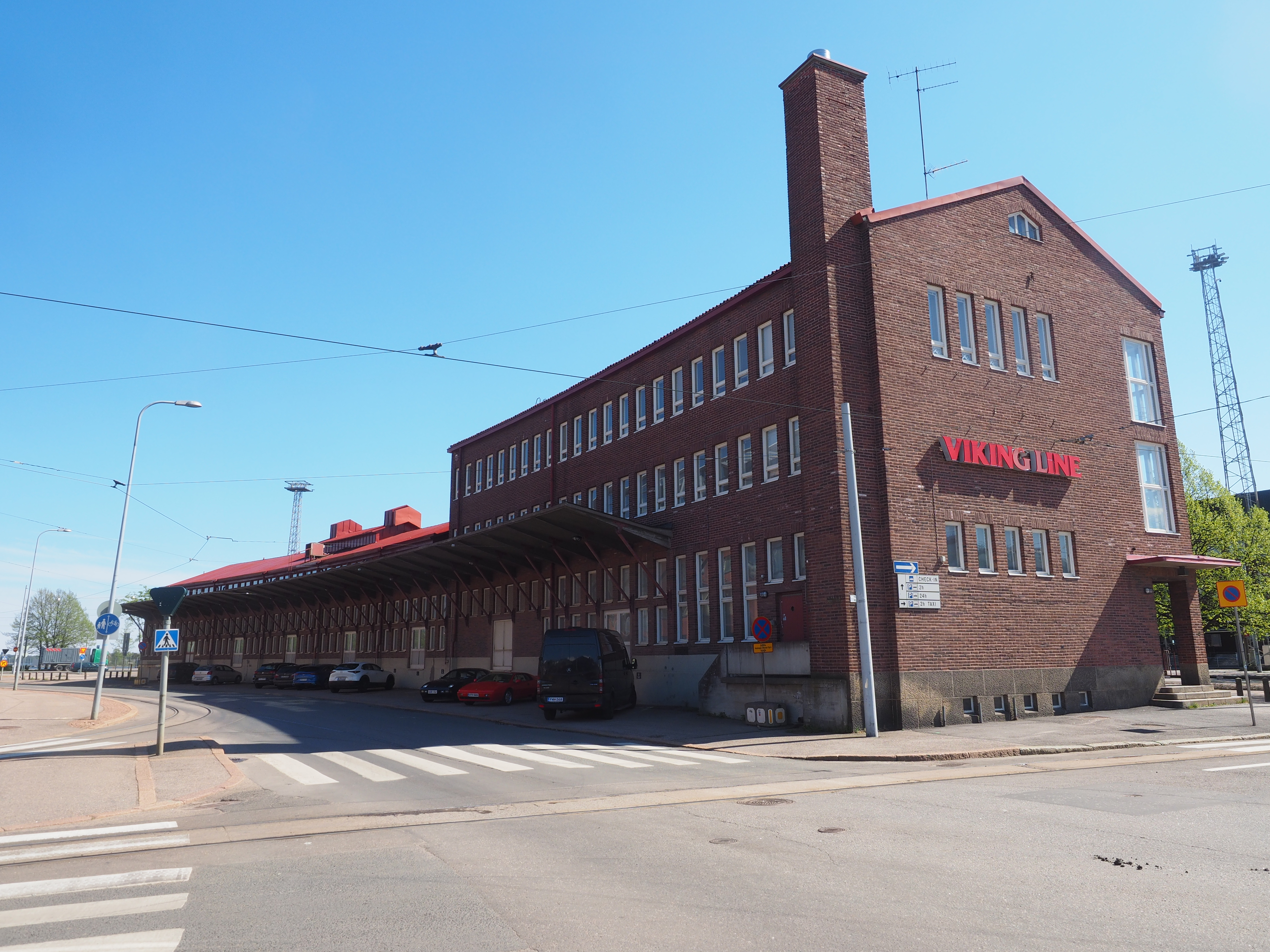
An office building for Viking Line located in an old cargo warehouse in Katajanokka, Helsinki.

Nils-Erik Eklund retired as Viking Line's CEO in July 2010. He was replaced by Mikael Backman, who has previously worked with Royal Caribbean. In interviews Backman has stated he hopes to introduce features from Caribbean cruise ships to Viking Line vessels, as well as begin selling Viking's routes to North American customers as a new cruise experience.

In a seminar held in January 2010, Backman stated that Viking Line were negotiating with nine different shipyards about the possibility of constructing a pair of 60,000 GT ships to replace Amorella and Isabella on the Turku–Stockholm service. The possibility of using liquefied natural gas engines and other emission-reducing technologies were reportedly researched, while according to Mikael Backman the ships would include various features akin to those found onboard cruise ships such as Royal Caribbean International's MS Oasis of the Seas. Projected delivery dates for the vessels were May 2012 and February 2013.

In October 2010 Viking Line signed a letter of intent with STX Turku for a 57,000 GT cruiseferry for the Turku–Stockholm route. Two months later, the formal order for the new ship was placed. The new ship, christened Viking Grace, was laid down on 6 March 2012 and launched on 10 August. The ship entered service in January 2013. Viking Line had an option for a sister ship but announced in May 2012 that they have decided not to build it.

Viking Line revealed in November 2016, that a letter of intent had been signed with Chinese shipyard Xiamen Shipbuilding for the construction of a 63,000 GT cruiseferry that would on completion replace the Amorella in the Viking Line fleet. The new ship would be LNG powered and would sport Flettner rotors to reduce fuel consumption.

On May 27, 2019, Viking Line announced the official name of the ship, M/S Viking Glory, after a public name-giving contest.

The maiden voyage of M/S Viking Glory took place from March 1–2, 2022. She is in service on the Stockholm-Mariehamn-Turku route.

== Corporation ==
The Viking Line Abp corporation includes the shipping companies Viking Rederi AB (previously known as Finlandshamnen), OÜ Viking Line Eesti, Viking Line Skandinavien AB, Viking Line Finnlandverkehr GmbH responsible for sales and marketing in Germany and Viking Line Buss Ab responsible for bus traffic. Each ship has its own command crew responsible for the activity and usage of the ship, including the ship's captain, chief of engineering and intendent. Viking Line has its own harbour terminals in Stockholm and Turku. In Helsinki, Mariehamn, Kapellskär and Tallinn the company rents the premises it needs for its activities. During adverse weather and sea ice (October to March), Viking Line uses ice-class vessels.

Jan Hanses has served as the CEO of Viking Line since 20 March 2014, replacing Mikael Backman who was dismissed from the corporation. Ben Lundqvist serves as chairman of the board. The head office of Viking Line is located in Mariehamn.

In 2025 Viking Line transported 4,608,573 passengers on its wholly owned vessels and 139,484 unit loads of cargo.

== Trademark ==
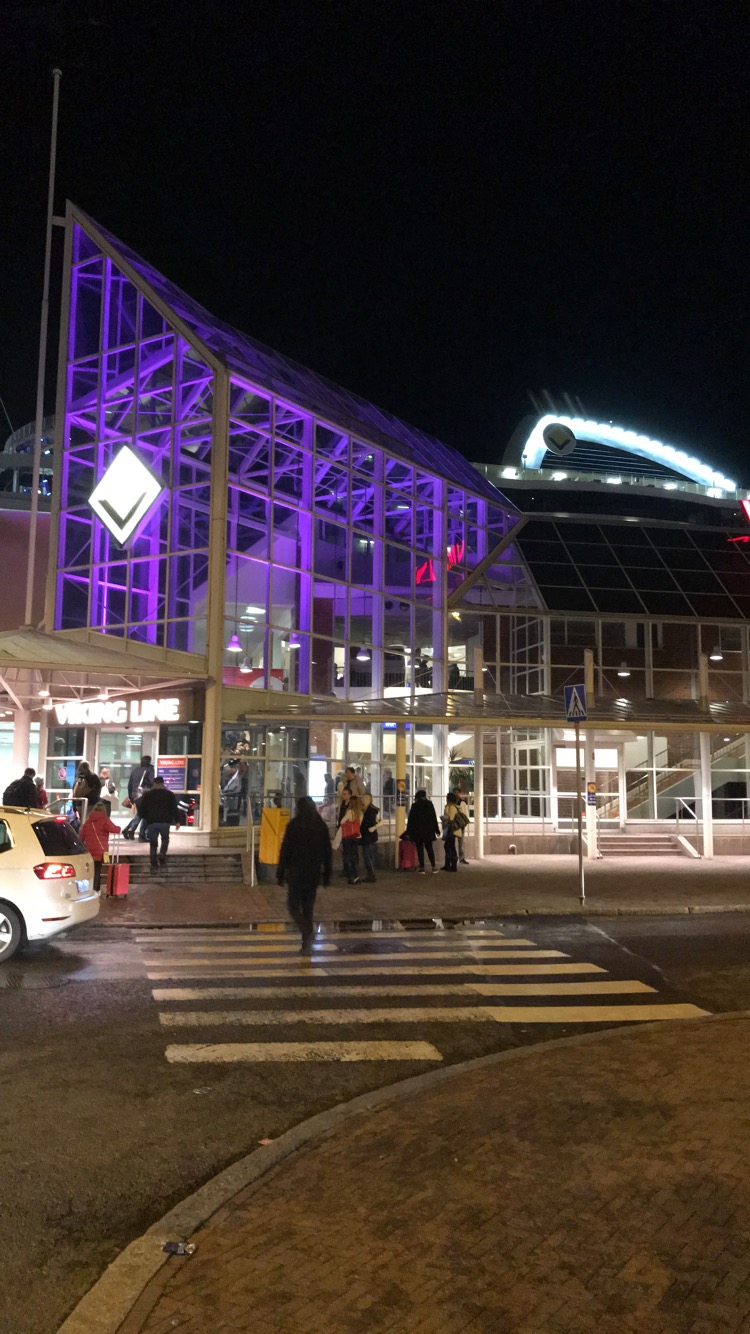
The yellow square logo of Viking Line is prominently displayed on the main entrance of the Turku terminal. In the background is the Viking Grace with a similar logo on its funnel.

Viking Line's ships are known for their vivid red colour. The colour dates from 1964 when the colouring of the new ship M/S Apollo was taken from the Mexican Fire lipstick used by the sister of the CEO of one of Viking Line's companies.

The name "Viking Line" is sometimes shown shortened as "NG LI", which is a registered trademark of the corporation. Viking Line has also used a logo consisting of a yellow square standing on its corner, with a black letter V inside it.

On the older ships of Viking Line, the announcements start with Rod Stewart's song "Sailing".

== Ville Viking ==
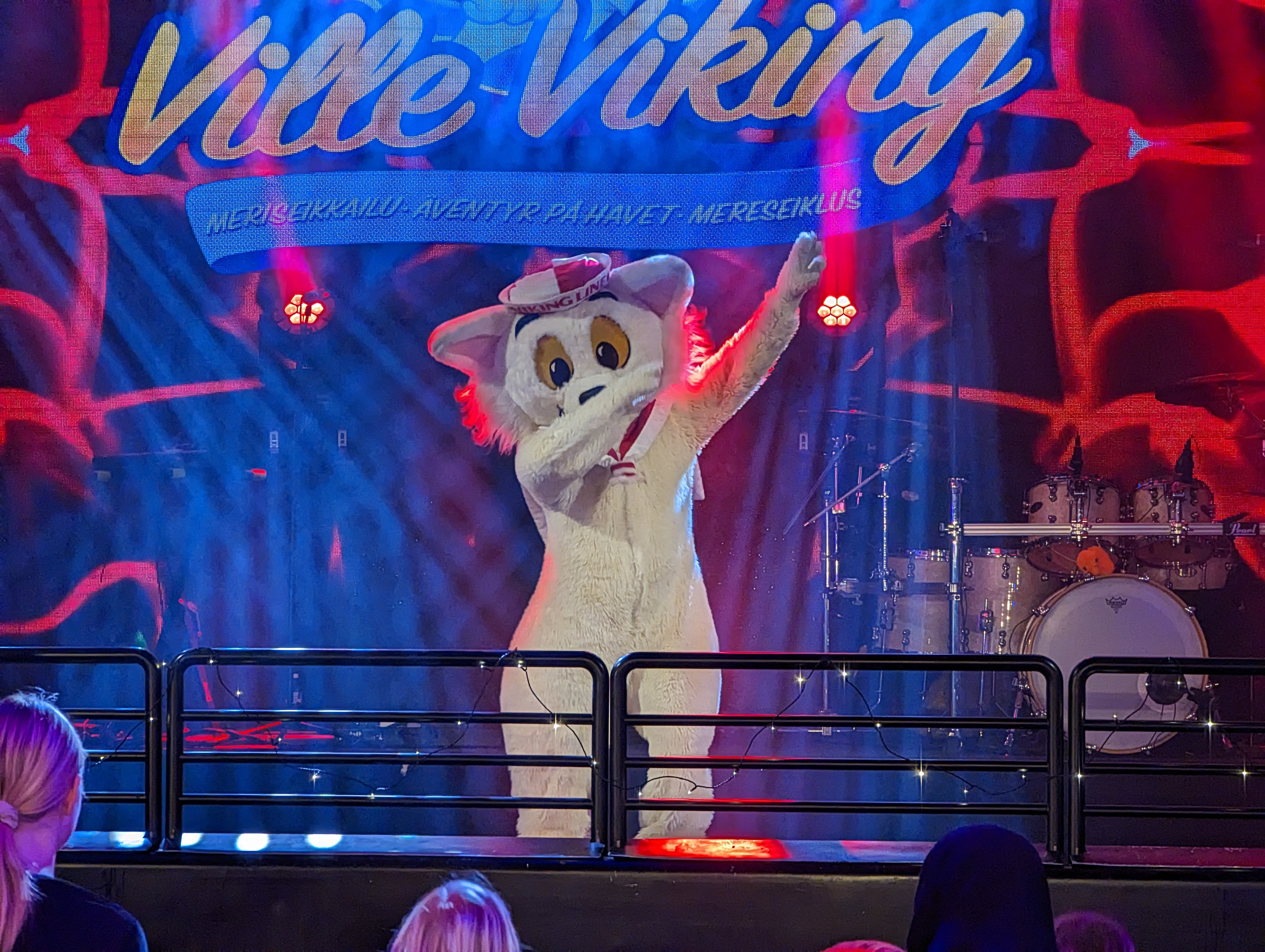
Ville Viking is a white ship's cat in a sailor's outfit.

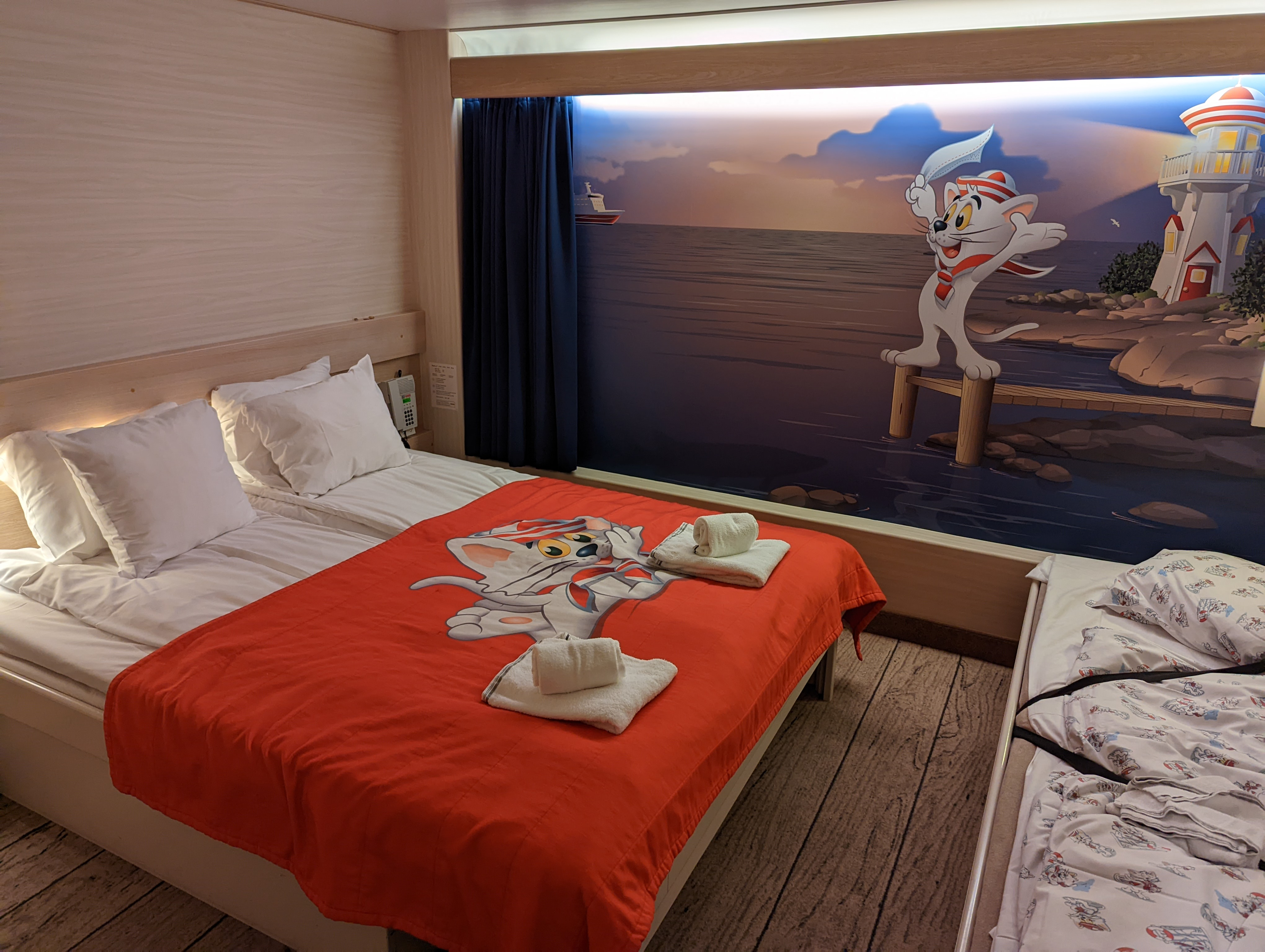
Ville Viking cabin

Ville Viking is the mascot of Viking Line, which is used as an icon for activities for children passengers, marketing and merchandising. The white ship's cat figure appears on ships and Viking Line's marketing events at least in Finland and Sweden. The feline figure can be hugged and can appear in pictures with people.

The name of the Viking Line children's club is Ville Viking Club. Children under 12 years of age can join the club free of charge, and members receive a mail letter twice per year. The club has its own cruises from Turku once per week and from Helsinki once per month except for the summer holiday season.

Alcohol-free Ville Viking drinks can be bought on Viking Line's ships. Children's menus and buffet tables on the ships are also named for the character.

In 2007 a CD of children's songs was published under the Ville Viking name.

== Fleet ==
=== Current fleet ===
Ship	Type	Built	Entered service	Gross tonnage	Passengers (max)	Vehicles	Knots	Route	Flag and home port	Image
MS Viking Cinderella	Cruiseferry	1989	1989–	46,398 GT	2.560	480	22	Helsinki – Mariehamn – Stockholm	(Åland) Mariehamn, Finland	
MS Gabriella	Cruiseferry	1992	1997–	35,492 GT	2.420	400	21,5	Helsinki – Mariehamn – Stockholm	(Åland) Mariehamn, Finland	
MS Viking XPRS	Cruiseferry	2008	2008–	35,918 GT	2.500	240	25	Helsinki – Tallinn	(Åland) Mariehamn, Finland	
MS Viking Grace	Cruiseferry	2013	2013–	57,565 GT	2.800	500	22	Turku – Mariehamn / Långnäs – Stockholm	(Åland) Mariehamn, Finland	
MS Viking Glory	Cruiseferry	2021	2022–	65,211 GT	2.800	640	22,1	Turku – Mariehamn / Långnäs – Stockholm	(Åland) Mariehamn, Finland	
MS Birka Gotland	Cruiseship	2004	2024–	34,924 GT	1.800	0	21,5	Stockholm – Mariehamn – Visby	Stockholm, Sweden	

=== Former ships ===
Ships that are still in use are marked in green.

Ship	Built	Owner/operator	In service	Current status	Image
SS Viking	1924	Rederi Ab Vikinglinjen	1959–1970	Scrapped in 1973.	
MS Slite; MS Tella	1955	Rederi AB Slite	1959–1963; 1989 (chartered)	Scrapped in 2006.	
MS Boge	1956	Rederi AB Slite	1961–1963	Sunk in 1981.	
MS Linden	1951		1963–1964	Scrapped in 1974.	
SS Ålandsfärjan	1933	Rederi Ab Ålandsfärjan	1963–1972	Scrapped in 1972.	
MS Thor Viking	1944		1963–1967	Scrapped in 1974.	
SS Drotten	1924	Rederi Ab Vikinglinjen	1964–1966	Scrapped in 1979.	
MS Apollo	1964	Rederi AB Slite	1964–1967	Scrapped in 2006.	
MS Visby	1964	Rederi AB Slite; Rederi Ab Ålandsfärjan	1965, 1967–1970 (chartered)	Scrapped in 2002.	
MS Kapella	1967	Rederi Ab Ålandsfärjan	1967–1979	Scrapped in 2006.	
MS Viking 2	1940	Rederi Ab Solstad	1968–1978	Scrapped in 2016.	
MS Apollo	1970	Rederi AB Slite	1970–1974	Scrapped in 2020.	
MS Viking 1	1970	Rederi Ab Sally	1970–1983	Scrapped in 2002.	
MS Marella	1970	SF Line	1970–1981	Scrapped in 2004.	
MS Viking 3	1972	Rederi Ab Sally	1972–1976	Scrapped at Aliağa, Turkey in 2022.	
MS Diana	1972	Rederi AB Slite	1972–1979	Scrapped in 2021.	
MS Viking 4	1973	Rederi Ab Sally	1973–1980	Scrapped in 2005.	
MS Aurella	1973	SF Line	1973–1982	Scrapped in 2024.	
MS Viking 5	1974	Rederi Ab Sally	1974–1981	Scrapped in 2015.	
MS Viking 6	1967	Rederi Ab Sally	1974–1980	Scrapped in 2001.	
SS Apollo III; MS Apollo III	1962	Rederi AB Slite	1976–1981; 1982–1989	Sold for scrap, July 2008.	
MS Turella	1979	SF Line	1979–1988	Since 2018 MS Rigel III for Ventouris Ferries.	
MS Diana II	1979	Rederi AB Slite	1979–1992	Scrapped in Alang, India as Bluefort.	
MS Viking Saga	1980	Rederi Ab Sally	1980–1986	Scrapped in Alang, India, 2025.	
MS Viking Sally	1980	Rederi Ab Sally; Rederi AB Slite	1980–1990	Sunk 1994 as MS Estonia.	
MS Viking Song	1980	Rederi Ab Sally	1980–1985	Since 2010 MS Regina Baltica for Baleària.	
MS Olympia	1986	Rederi AB Slite	1986–1993	Since 2023 MS Moby Orli for Moby Lines.	
MS Athena	1989	Rederi AB Slite	1989–1993	Since 2025 MS Nordic Pearl for Destination Gotland.	
MS Kalypso	1990	Rederi AB Slite	1990–1994	Scrapped in 2022.	
HSC Condor 10 (marketed as Viking Express I)	1992	Viking Line	1995 (chartered)	Since 2018 HSC Tiger for Tiger Shipping.	
MS Ålandsfärjan	1972	SF Line/Viking Line	1987–2008	Since 2008 MS Expedition for G.A.P. Shipping.	
MS Isabella	1989	SF Line/Viking Line	1989–2013	Since 2024 MS Isabelle X is sold to Notamare Shipping.	
HSC Express (marketed as Viking FSTR)	1998	Viking Line	2017 (chartered)	Since 2019 HSC Superexpress for Golden Star Ferries.	
MS Mariella	1985	SF Line/Viking Line	1985–2021	Since 2021 MS Mega Regina for Corsica Ferries.	
MS Amorella	1988	SF Line/Viking Line	1988–2022	Since 2022 MS Mega Victoria for Corsica Ferries.	
MS Rosella	1980	SF Line/Viking Line	1980–2023	Since 2026 MS Anemos for Seajets.	Frameless

Additionally a large number of ferries were chartered during the 1970s, 1980s and 1990s for seasonal traffic.

=== Planned new ships ===
Ship	Estimated time of completion	Estimated time of start of service	Planned route	Notes
M/S Viking Helios	Unknown	2030s	Helsinki - Tallinn	85 MWh battery
Sister ship of M/S Viking Helios	Unknown	Unknown	Helsinki - Tallinn	

=== Ordered but never delivered ===
Planned/project name	Projected delivery	Ordered by	Gross tonnage	Notes	Current status
MS Europa	1993	Rederi AB Slite	59,912 GT	Building project was almost complete when Rederi AB Slite went bankrupt. She was then completed for Silja Line as MS Silja Europa in 1993.	In Tallink service.
MS Viking ADCC	2009	Viking Line	15,600 GT	Building project cancelled by Viking Line due to Seville shipyard's inability to complete the ship on time.	Hull was transferred to another shipyard in Vigo, where it was finished and delivered to Trasmediterránea as MS Villa de Teror in July 2019,10 years after original delivery date. Since 2021 Madeleine II for CTMA.
MS Hansa Express	1962	Rederi Ab Vikinglinjen	2,268 GRT	Completed for Finnlines as MS Hansa Express, 1962.	Scrapped in 2003.

== Terminals ==
Viking Line has six terminals, of which four are in Finland (two in mainland Finland and two in Åland), one in Sweden and one in Estonia.

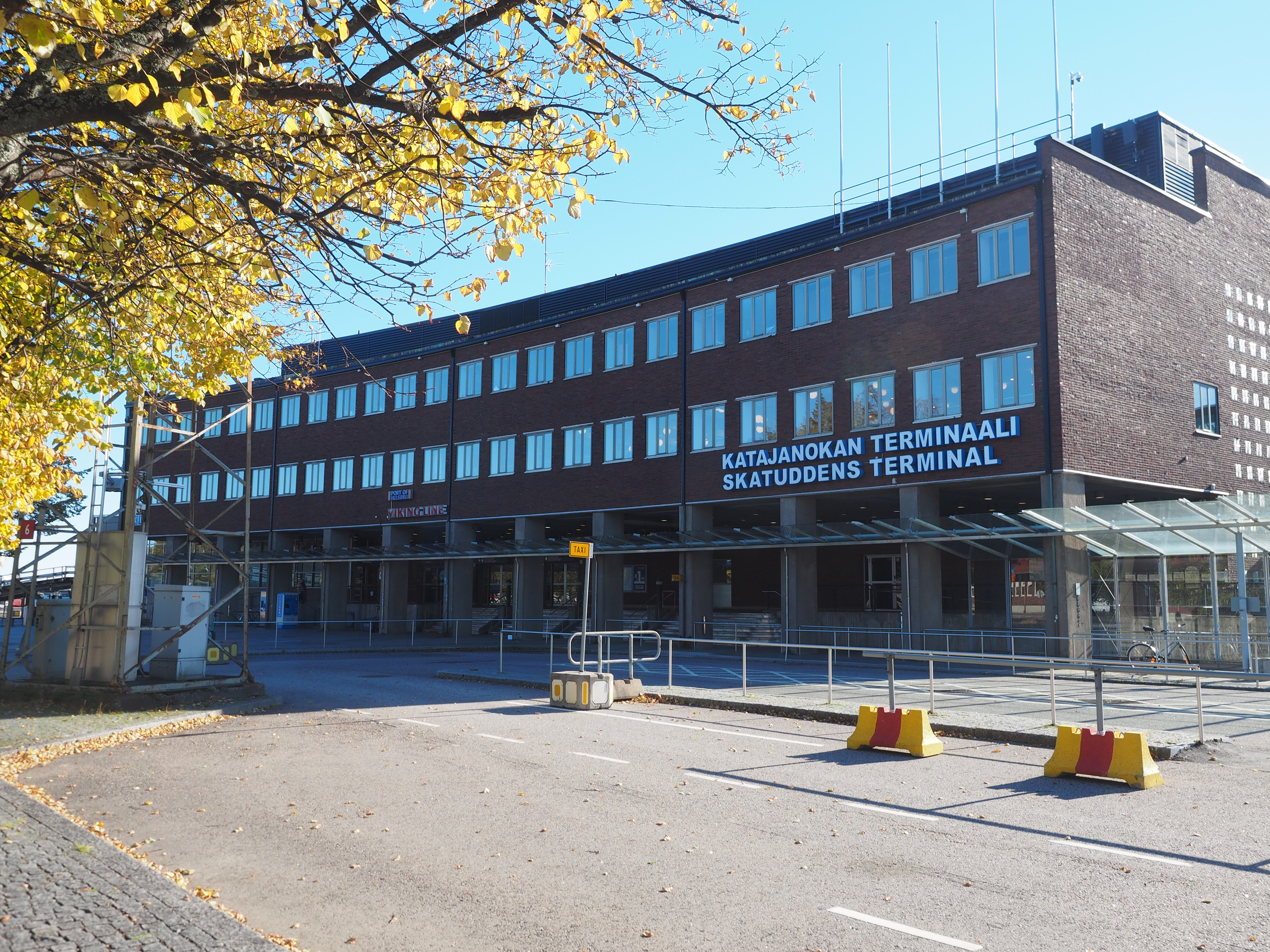
Viking Line terminal in Helsinki, Finland

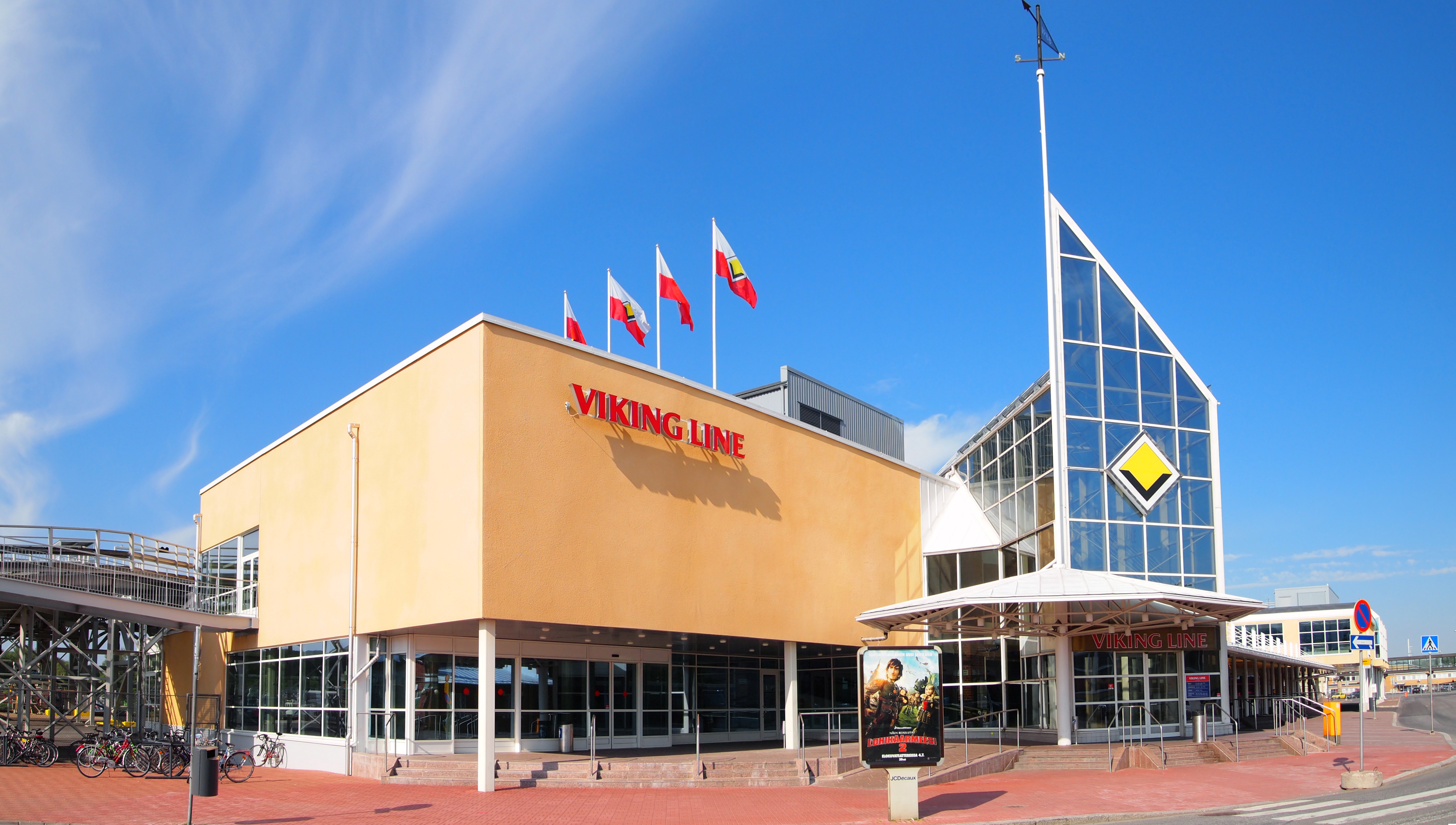
Viking Line terminal in Turku, Finland

Finland

- Helsinki: Katajanokka Terminal. Served by Helsinki tram lines 4 and 5.
- Turku: Linnansatama. Served by the Port of Turku railway station and bus line 1.
- Mariehamn: Västhamnen. Served by the Mariehamn city bus.
- Lumparland: Långnäs.

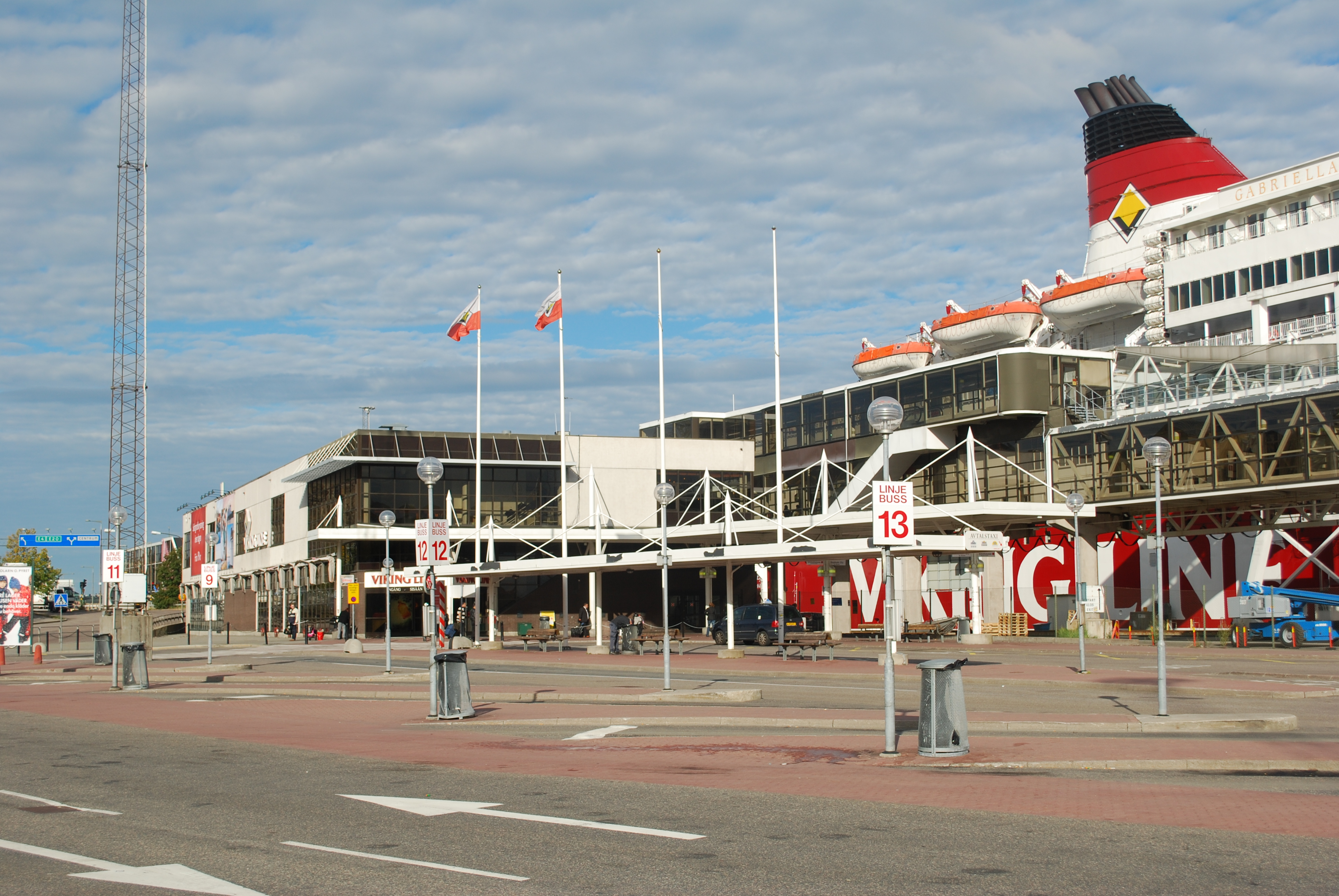
Viking Line terminal in Stockholm, Sweden

Sweden

- Stockholm: Stadsgården. Served by a terminal bus line and the city ship Emelie.

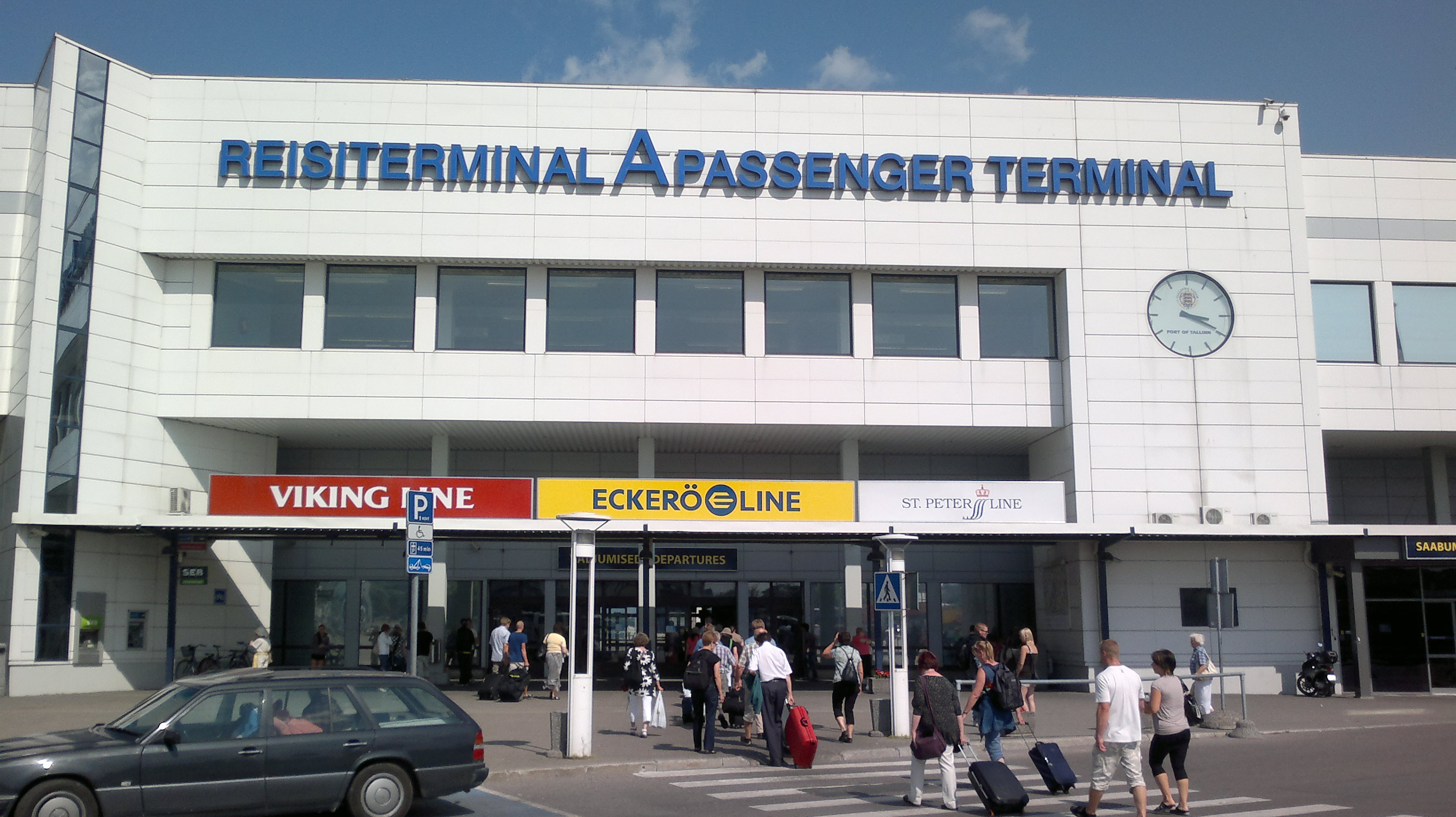
Viking Line terminal in Tallinn, Estonia

Estonia

- Tallinn: A-terminal. Served by Tallinn tram line nr. T2

== See also ==
- Finnish maritime cluster
- List of companies of Finland
- Viking
