= MS Expedition =

Cruise ship built in 1972

History
- Name: 1972–1978: Kattegat; 1978–1985: nf Tiger; 1985–1986: Tiger; 1986–2008: Ålandsfärjan; 2008 onwards: Expedition
- Owner: 1972–1978: Jydsk Færgefart A/S; 1978–1985: Midland Montague Leasing; 1985–1986: Townsend Car Ferries; 1986–2008: Finlandshamnen Ab; 2008 onwards: The Expedition Shipping Company LTD
- Operator: 1972–1978: Jydsk Færgefart A/S; 1978–1985: P&O Normandy Ferries; 1985–1986: Townsend Thoresen; 1986–2008: Viking Line; 2008 onwards: G Adventures
- Port of registry: 1972–1978: Hundested, Denmark; 1978–1985: London, United Kingdom; 1985–1986: Dover, United Kingdom; 1986–2008: Norrtälje, Sweden; 2008 onwards: Monrovia, Liberia
- Builder: Helsingør Skibsværft og Maskinbyggeri, Helsingør, Denmark
- Yard number: 398
- Launched: 24 March 1972
- Acquired: 14 July 1972
- In service: 15 July 1972
- Identification: IMO number: 7211074
- Status: In service

General characteristics (as Kattegat)
- Type: Ferry
- Tonnage: 3,960 GRT; 925 DWT
- Length: 104.04 m (341 ft 4 in)
- Beam: 18.93 m (62 ft 1 in)
- Draught: 4.37 m (14 ft 4 in)
- Decks: 6
- Ice class: 1B
- Installed power: 2 × HSM-B&W 10U45HU; 8,096 kW (combined)
- Capacity: 1,200 passengers; 63 berths; 220 cars

General characteristics (as Ålandsfärjan)
- Type: Ferry
- Length: 105.20 m (345 ft 2 in)
- Beam: 18.93 m (62 ft 1 in)
- Draught: 4.71 m (15 ft 5 in)
- Speed: 17.0 knots (31.5 km/h; 19.6 mph)
- Capacity: 963 passengers; 180 cars
- Notes: Otherwise the same as Kattegat

General characteristics (as Expedition)
- Type: Expedition cruise ship
- Tonnage: 6,334 GT
- Length: 105 m (344 ft 6 in)
- Beam: 18.9 m (62 ft 0 in)
- Draught: 4.71 m (15 ft 5 in)
- Speed: 17.0 knots (31.5 km/h; 19.6 mph)
- Capacity: 134 passengers; 134 berths
- Crew: 69
- Notes: Otherwise the same as Ålandsfärjan

MS Expedition is an expedition cruise ship owned and operated by the Canada-based G Adventures (formerly known as Gap Adventures). She was built as a car/passenger ferry in 1972 by Helsingør Skibsværft og Maskinbyggeri A/S, Helsingør, Denmark as Kattegat for Jydsk Færgefart A/S. Subsequently, she sailed under the names nf Tiger for P&O Normandy Ferries, Tiger for Townsend Thoresen and Ålandsfärjan for Viking Line, prior to conversion into a cruise ship in 2008. The MS Expedition has the IMO number 7211074 and is ice-strengthened, having an ice class of 1B. There are two higher classes, being 1A Super and 1A.

== Service history ==
=== As a car ferry ===
The Kattegat was delivered in 1972 and placed on the intra-Denmark Grenå—Hundested service of Jydsk Færgefart A/S. She stopped serving on that route in December 1977. In March 1978 she was sold to the London-based Midland Montague Leasing Ltd who leased the ship to P&O Normandy Ferries Ltd, also based in London. After rebuilding at Caillard S.A., Le Havre, France, the ship was renamed nf Tiger and placed on the Dover—Boulogne-sur-Mer service. In 1985 P&O Normandy Ferries was bought by Townsend Thoresen. The ship's name was shortened to Tiger, but she remained on the same service.

In July 1986 the ship was laid up, and in November of the same year she was sold to Finlandshamnen AB, a subsidiary to SF Line, one of the owners of the Viking Line consortium. After being rebuilt, the ship was renamed Ålandsfärjan (in English "The Åland Ferry") and was placed on the Mariehamn—Kapellskär service in May 1987. In 1993, following bankruptcy of the other Viking Line partner, Rederi AB Slite, the Ålandsfärjan's route was extended into Naantali—Mariehamn—Kapellskär (freight only on the Mariehamn—Naantali part of the route), but this solution was found impractical and soon the ship reverted to the earlier route).

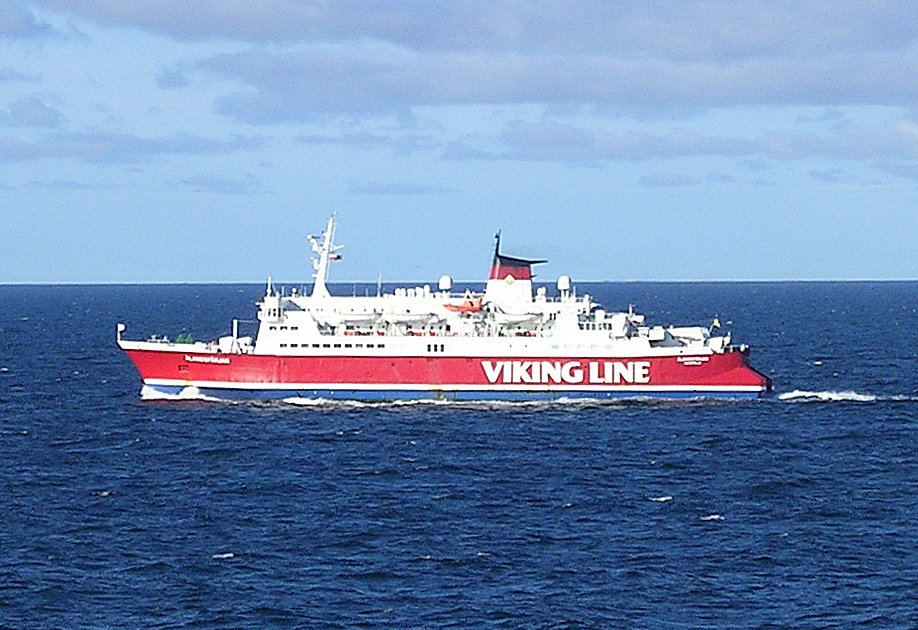
Ålandsfärjan on the Åland Sea, October 2006.

In 2002 the ship was rebuilt at Baltic Ship Repairers, Tallinn, Estonia, where sidesponsons were added for increased stability. In January 2007, Viking Line ordered a replacement for her to be delivered in summer 2009, codenamed Viking ADCC.

On 23 October 2007, the Ålandsfärjan touched the bottom near Mariehamn. Passengers were readied for evacuation, but an inspection of the ship revealed no major damage and she was able to continue to Mariehamn under her own power, arriving some 30 minutes behind schedule. As a result of the accident, all departures until 22 November were cancelled. Investigations revealed that the cause for the accident was the new duty rosters: the officer on duty was inspecting the new roster and because of that failed to notice that the ship should have made a course change whilst approaching Mariehamn.

In September 2007 an Ålandian newspaper claimed that the Ålandsfärjan would be replaced on the Mariehamn—Kapellskär route in spring 2008, when Rosella would take over the route. On 8 April 2008, Viking Line confirmed the claim and on 30 May, the Rosella replaced the Ålandsfärjan on that route.

=== As the MS Expedition cruise ship ===
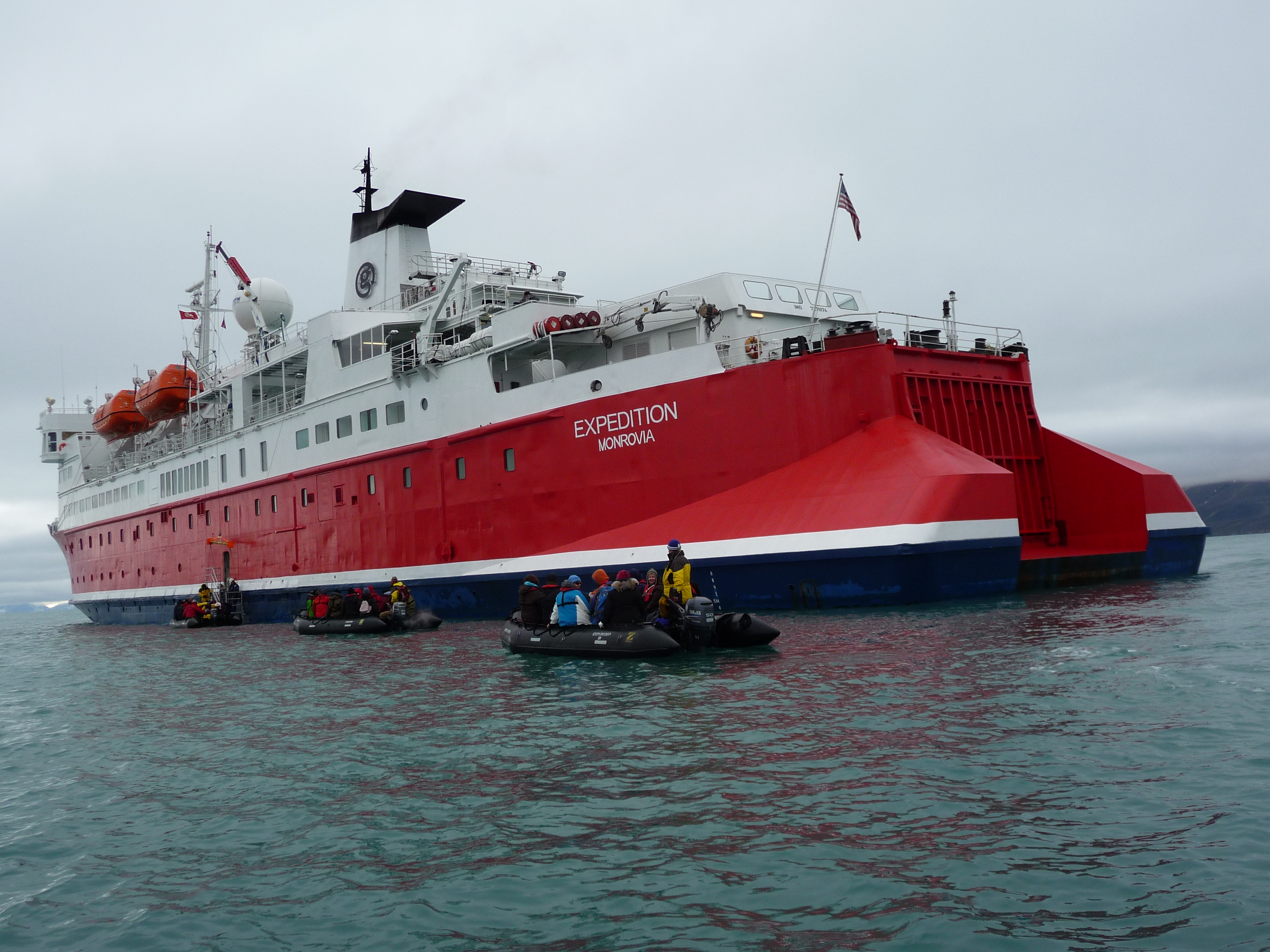
MS Expedition at Krossfjorden, Arctic, in 2010

On 27 May 2008, Viking Line revealed that they had sold the Ålandsfärjan to Gap Adventures with delivery in June 2008. Following delivery to her new owners, the ship was renamed Expedition, and on 27 June the ship sailed for Aker Yards Rauma Shipyard. On that day she was also formally registered in the name of Expedition under the Liberian flag in the ownership of the Expedition Shipping Company LTD (FME) Monrovia, Liberia.

Aker Yards subsequently drew up plans for the conversion and refurbishment of the vessel, and on 10 September 2008 the conversion contract was signed between Aker Yards and Gap Adventures. The conversion cost thirteen million dollars. The Expedition then re-entered service on 4 January 2009, re-launching GAP's polar cruise program which had been halted due to the sinking of their previous ship, Explorer. MS Expedition was formally christened at Las Palmas, Gran Canaria, Canary Islands on 11 October 2010.

Between June and September 2009 the Expedition was chartered to Spitsbergen Travel, a daughter company of the Norway-based Hurtigruten, for week-long cruises around Spitsbergen. Following this, she underwent further repair work in Las Palmas, Gran Canaria after she developed engine problems in October 2009. A major overhaul was done on both main engines and at the same time there were repairs to a corroded deck, renovation of crew cabin areas and also the removal of some asbestos. The work was due to be completed by December 2009, but ultimately resulted in the cancellation of much of the first Antarctic season.

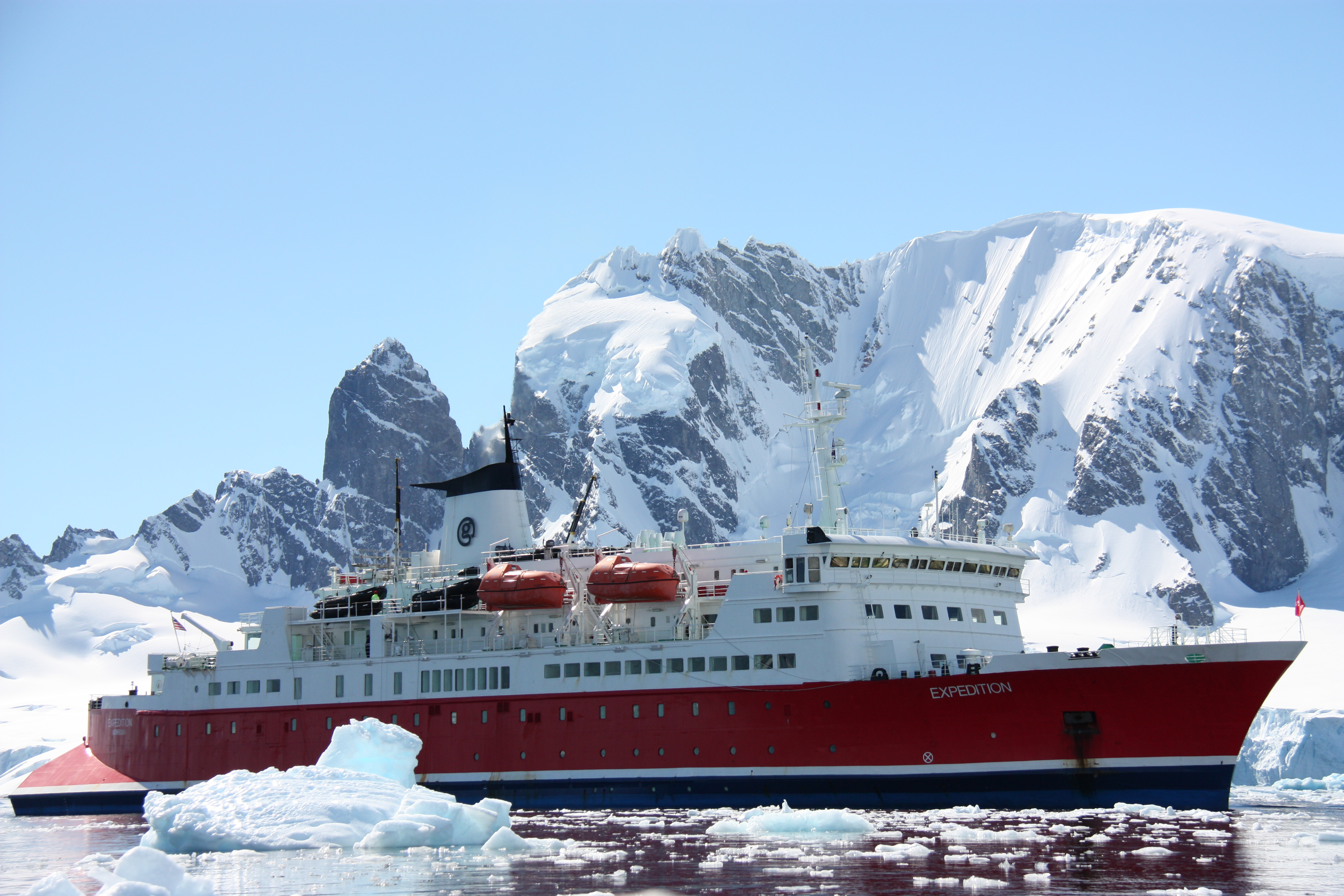
MS Expedition at Enterprise Island, Antarctic in 2012

In February 2010 she arrived in Ushuaia, Argentina, for the remainder of her first season in the Antarctic with GAP Adventures, before returning to the Arctic in June 2010 for her first full season in the north. Since then she has been alternating between the two polar regions each year during their respective summer seasons and offering additional cruises during the transitional journeys from one pole to the other. These included a cruise along the west coast of Africa and a cruise along the west coast of South America, stopping at ports along the way.

On 23 July 2012, the Expedition touched bottom at Isispynten, east of Nordaustlandet in the Arctic. Reports state that the ship was travelling at a low speed at the time and that nobody was ever in any danger. The ship freed itself under its own engine power and continued on its way. One reason given for this was the buildup of rubbish in the bottom of the channel which had severely restricted the depth of water in an area that the ship had regularly travelled through.

In November 2014, several trips had to be cancelled when her port engine failed unexpectedly whilst the ship was berthed in Ushuaia, Argentina. This was fully repaired and trips are now running again normally. However, at the end of the 2015 Arctic season, she was due to have both engines replaced.

In November, 2015 two trips were cancelled because of delays in the shipyard in Italy.

== MS Expedition tours ==
=== Arctic tours ===
The 2015 Arctic season typically includes three different types of tour. The first starts in Edinburgh, Scotland, and visits Orkney, travels the Norwegian coast and then finishes at Longyearbyen, Spitsbergen. Following tours circumnavigate the islands of Svalbard, starting and finishing at Longyearbyen. The final tour of the season travels from Longyearbyen to Greenland and finishes in Reykjavík, Iceland.

=== Antarctic tours ===
The Antarctic season includes various tours starting at either Ushuaia, Argentina or Montevideo, Uruguay, crossing the Drake Passage and travelling along the Antarctic Peninsula, visiting the South Shetland Islands, the Weddell Sea, the Falkland Islands and South Georgia.

== Cruising style ==
The ship carries a maximum of 134 passengers and travels the polar regions with a number of on-board guides and scientific experts/lecturers in relevant fields. Trips ashore are arranged to see the landscapes, geology, flora and fauna, by using 12-man Zodiac inflatable boats. The ship contains a heated mudroom in which boots and clothing can be stored after excursions, enabling anything wet to dry out quickly.

On board, there are viewing platforms, a bar and restaurant, five different standards of cabin (all en-suite) and a lounge big enough to accommodate all passengers in which lectures and presentations can be given. Live evening entertainment is provided in the Polar Bear Bar. There is also a gym, sauna, library, computer room and a gift shop. Passengers can also keep in touch with the outside world via a satellite-linked internet/phone system.
