= Viking Glory =

Finnish cruise ship

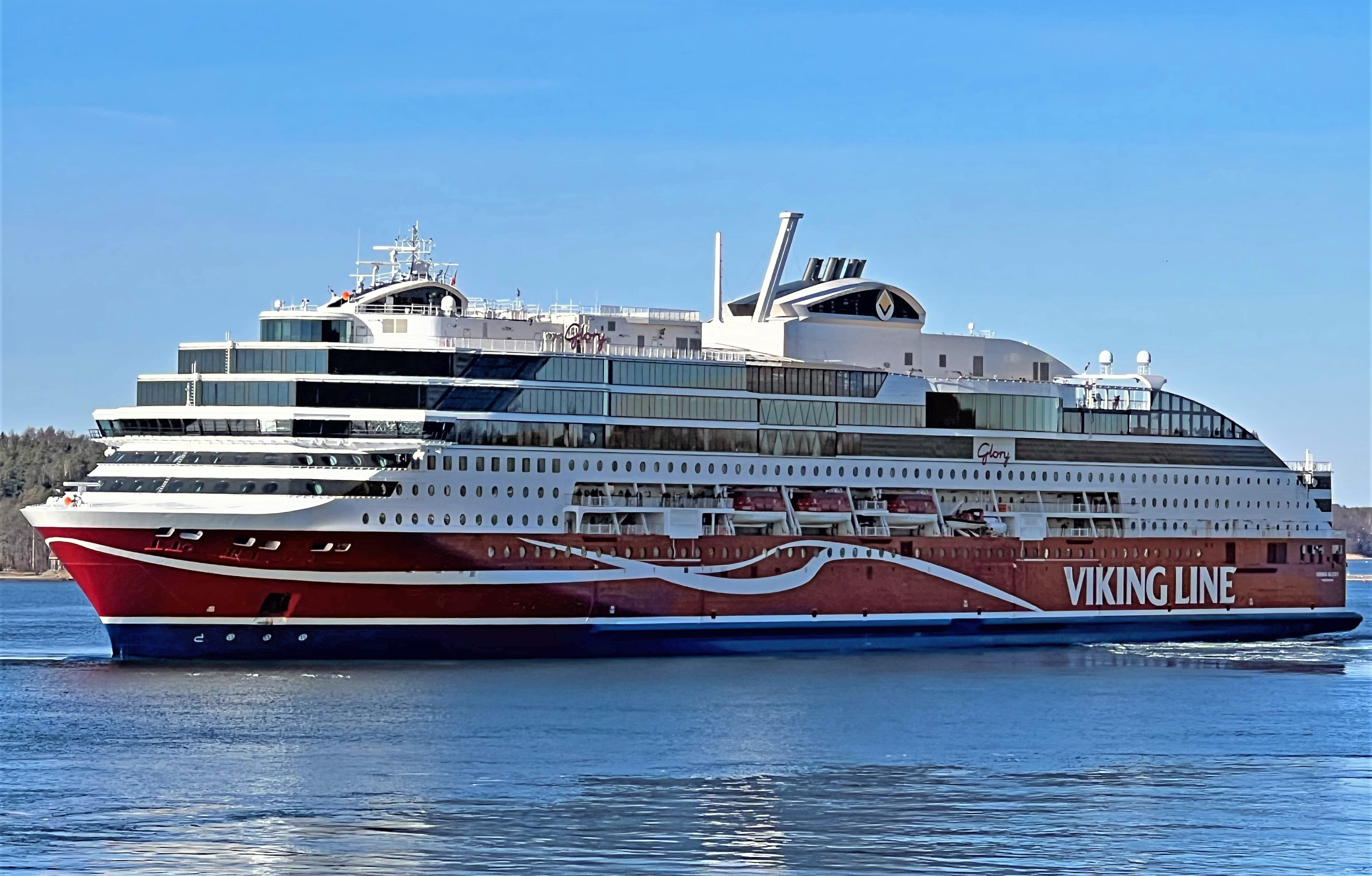

History

Finland
- Name: Viking Glory
- Owner: Viking Line
- Port of registry: Mariehamn, Finland
- Route: Turku–Mariehamn/Långnäs–Stockholm
- Ordered: 05 April 2017
- Builder: Xiamen Shipbuilding Industry Fujian, China
- Cost: 225 million euro (estimate)
- Laid down: 3 June 2019
- Launched: 26 January 2021
- Completed: 23 December 2021
- Maiden voyage: 1-2 March 2022
- In service: 2022–Present
- Identification: IMO number: 9827877; Call sign: OJTC; MMSI number: 230041000
- Status: In service

General characteristics
- Type: Cruiseferry
- Tonnage: 65,211 GT
- Length: 222.55 m (730 ft 2 in)
- Beam: 35 m (114 ft 10 in)
- Ice class: 1 A Super
- Installed power: 6 × Wärtsilä 10V31DF (6 × 5500kW) (550 kW/Cylinder))
- Propulsion: Diesel-electric; 2 × ABB Azipod thrusters
- Speed: 22 knots (41 km/h; 25 mph)
- Capacity: 2,800 passengers; 1,500 lane meters for ro-ro cargo; 1,000 lane meters for cars
- Crew: 200

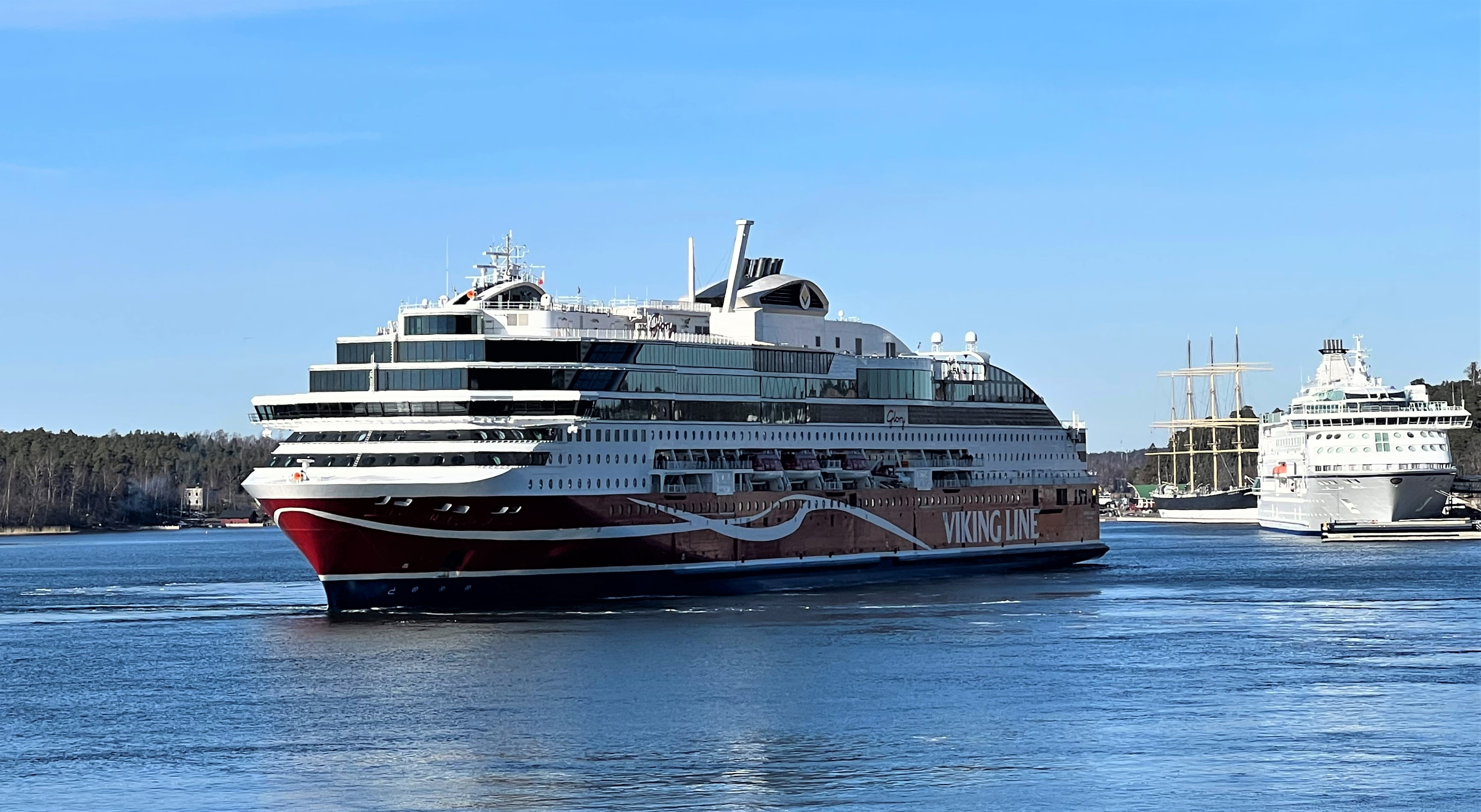
Viking Glory docking in Mariehamn, Finland, in March 2022.

MS Viking Glory is a cruiseferry owned and operated by Viking Line. The ship was launched in January 2021 and entered service in March 2022. Viking Glory was built at the Xiamen Shipbuilding Industry shipyard in China. The order was worth 225 million euro. The ship operates the Turku-Åland-Stockholm route, where she replaced the Amorella.

Viking Glory was built on the foundation of Viking Grace, but her energy efficiency was sought to improve. The ship is slightly longer and wider than Viking Grace, making her nine percent larger. In terms of gross tonnage (GT) Viking Glory is the largest cruiseferry on the northern Baltic Sea.

Viking Glory leaves from Turku in the morning and arrives at Mariehamn together with its sister ship Viking Grace in the afternoon on the same day. The ship stops at Mariehamn for 15 minutes. In the evening the ship arrives in Stockholm and stays there for an hour, after which it continues back towards Turku via Långnäs. Because of this, a full cruise takes 23 hours. Viking Glory usually leaves Turku in the morning, but it has also made evening departures for several days or even a week on end.

== Decks ==
Deck 11
Kobba Restaurant & Bar, Archipelago Spa & Wellness, Viking Terrace, sun deck
Deck 10
The Buffet, Mimmi's Restaurant, Market Restaurant, Bar & Bakery, Vista Room Club / Vista Lounge, Casino, Algoth's Bar, Vista Deck
Deck 9
Torget Café & Bar, Conference, Shopping World, Info, Kids' playroom, The Hangout, bridge
Deck 8
cabins, crew quarters
Deck 7
cabins, outer deck, crew quarters
Deck 6
cabins, outer deck, Drivers' club, crew quarters
Deck 5
cabins, car dek
Deck 4
car deck
Deck 3
car deck
Deck 2
engine room, kitchen, crew quarters
Deck 1
engine room

== Services ==
=== Restaurants ===
- Kobba Restaurant and Bar
- Fyren
- Mimmi's
- The Buffet
- Market
- Viking Terrace
- Torget Café & Bar

=== Bars and nightclubs ===
- Vista Room
- Vista Deck
- Algoth's

=== Shops ===
- Shopping World Tax Free

=== Children and youth ===
- Kids' playroom (on holidays outside the summer)
- The Hangout
- Leikkihuone
- Adventure Island (in the summer)

=== Wellness ===
- Archipelago Spa & Wellness

=== Others ===
- Info
- Conference

== Facts ==
- The shellfish restaurant Kobba was named after the island of Kobbaklintar in the Åland islands.
- The "speakeasy" Algoths next to the Vista room was named after the famous Finnish smuggler Algoth Niska.
- The hamburger restaurant Mimmi's was named after the female sailor Wilhelmina "Mimmi" Widbom.

== Construction ==
The ship was ordered on April 5, 2017 and construction was started in China on September 3, 2018. The keel was landed on June 3, 2019. Nordic companion companies of the ship construction include Wärtsilä, Kone, Deltamarin and Almaco. Under construction, the working name for the ship was NB 488A.

The ship was launched on January 26, 2021 and delivered to Viking Line in December 2021. Viking Glory's first cruise was on March 1, 2022.

The contract included an option for another ship, but Viking Line has not made any announcement about a possible sister ship.

=== Naming contest ===
In spring 2019 a naming contest was held for the ship, where the public could suggest a name for the new ship. Viking Line picked ten finalists from the suggestions, where the public could vote for their favourite. The finalists included names Arielle, Estelle, Glory, Lady, Mary, Panorama, Rose, Sophia, Stelle and Vista. The name of the ship was published on May 27, 2019.

=== Lateness ===
Viking Glory was originally supposed to start traffic in spring 2020. This was later moved to autumn 2020 and then again to spring 2021. Because of the COVID-19 pandemic starting from spring 2020, the delivery of the ship was moved to summer 2021. As the pandemic worsened the delivery was moved again to autumn 2021. On 26 January 2021 the delivery was moved to spring 2022. In the end the delivery was made almost two years late.

Because of the lateness the budget for the ship increased from 194 million Euro to 225 million Euro.

Viking Line is planning to seek compensation from the Xiamen Shipbuilding Industry dockyards because of the late delivery and overflow of the budget.

According to Jan Hansen, CEO of Viking Line, Viking Glory was the longest and most difficult project in the history of the company.

== Incidents ==
- On 3 August 2022 Viking Glory was travelling from Turku to Stockholm and suffered a power cut at about 11:00 in the morning. The ship continued to Stockholm arriving about an hour late, and continued back to Turku on the same evening. Because of the power cut, the ship Viking Grace on the same route had to wait in Mariehamn for picnic cruise passengers arriving from Viking Glory from Turku for about an hour.

== Home voyage to Finland and preparations ==
=== Home voyage ===
From 28 December 2021 to 6 February 2022 Viking Glory went on a 41-day-long voyage from Xiamen to Turku via Malesia, Sri Lanka, Djibouti, the Suez canal, Cyprus, the strait of Gibraltar and Copenhagen. In front of Sri Lanka the ship was caught in nets set out by local fishermen. By the time Viking Glory arrived at the Suez canal, it had not been registered for the passage list even though it had reserved a passage spot in advance. The ship also had to stay at the Gibraltar harbour for a longer time than expected because of storms on the Atlantic Ocean. Viking Glory arrived at the Port of Turku with celebrations ongoing on 6 February 2022 at about 11:00 in the morning.

=== Preparations for traffic ===
From 24 to 26 February 2022 Viking Glory tested docking at the piers in Långnäs, Mariehamn and Stockholm. Because of the large size of the ship, it had to test the conditions at the narrow harbours at Långnäs and Mariehamn.

== Maiden voyage ==
The maiden voyage of Viking Glory was held on 1 March 2022. The cruise was sold out quickly, as were many subsequent cruises.

== Inside pictures ==
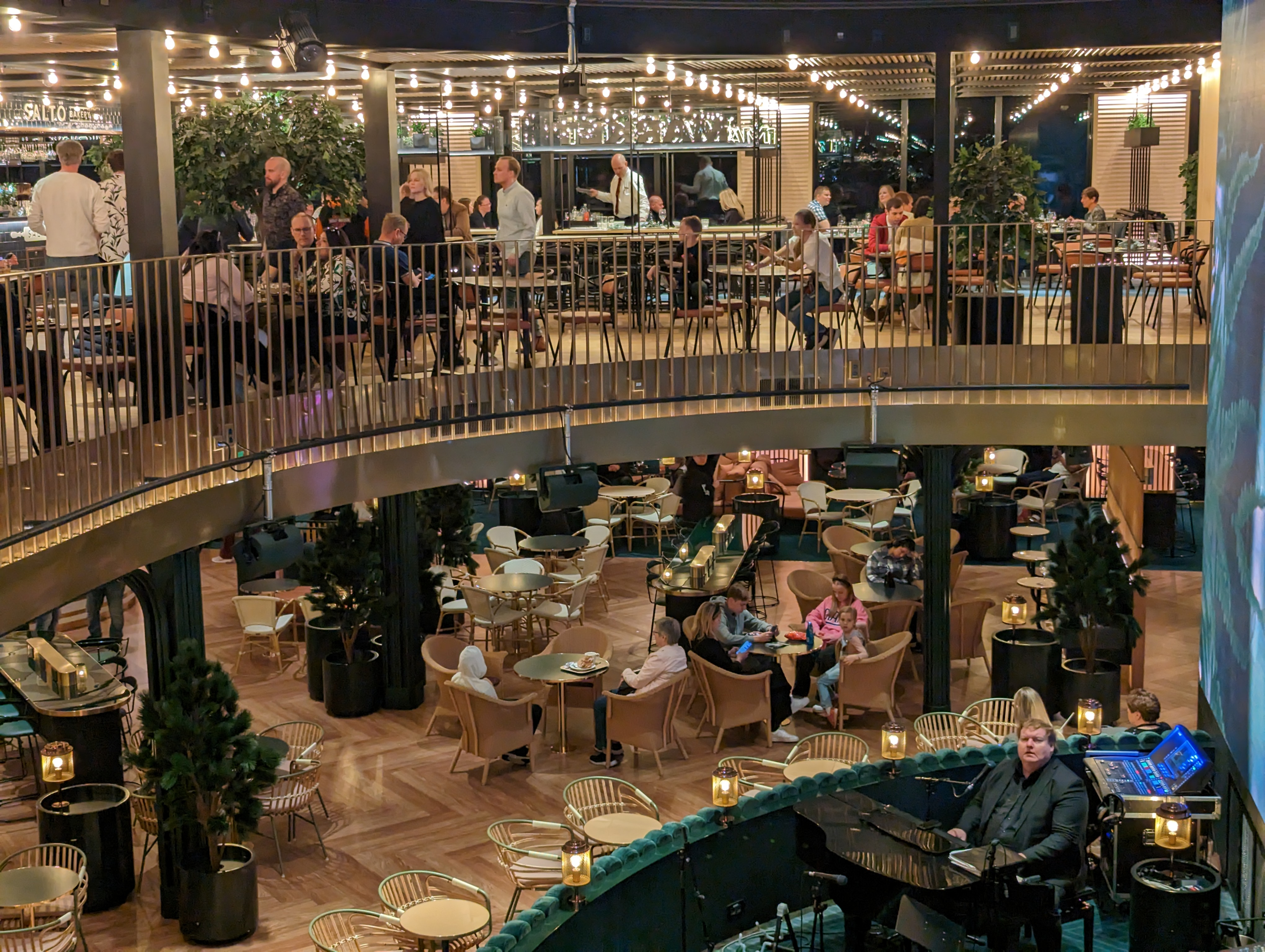
Torget.

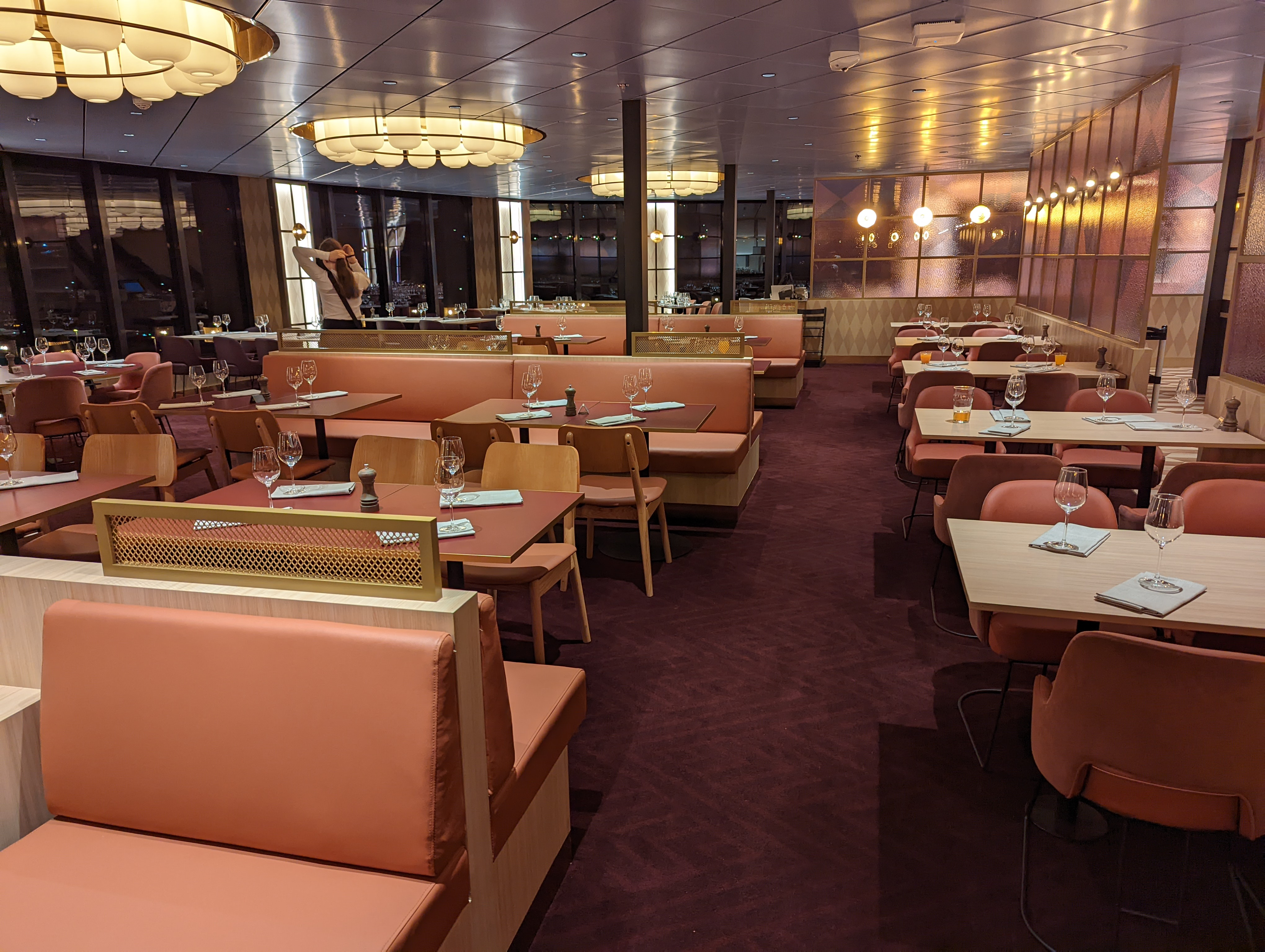
Buffet restaurant.

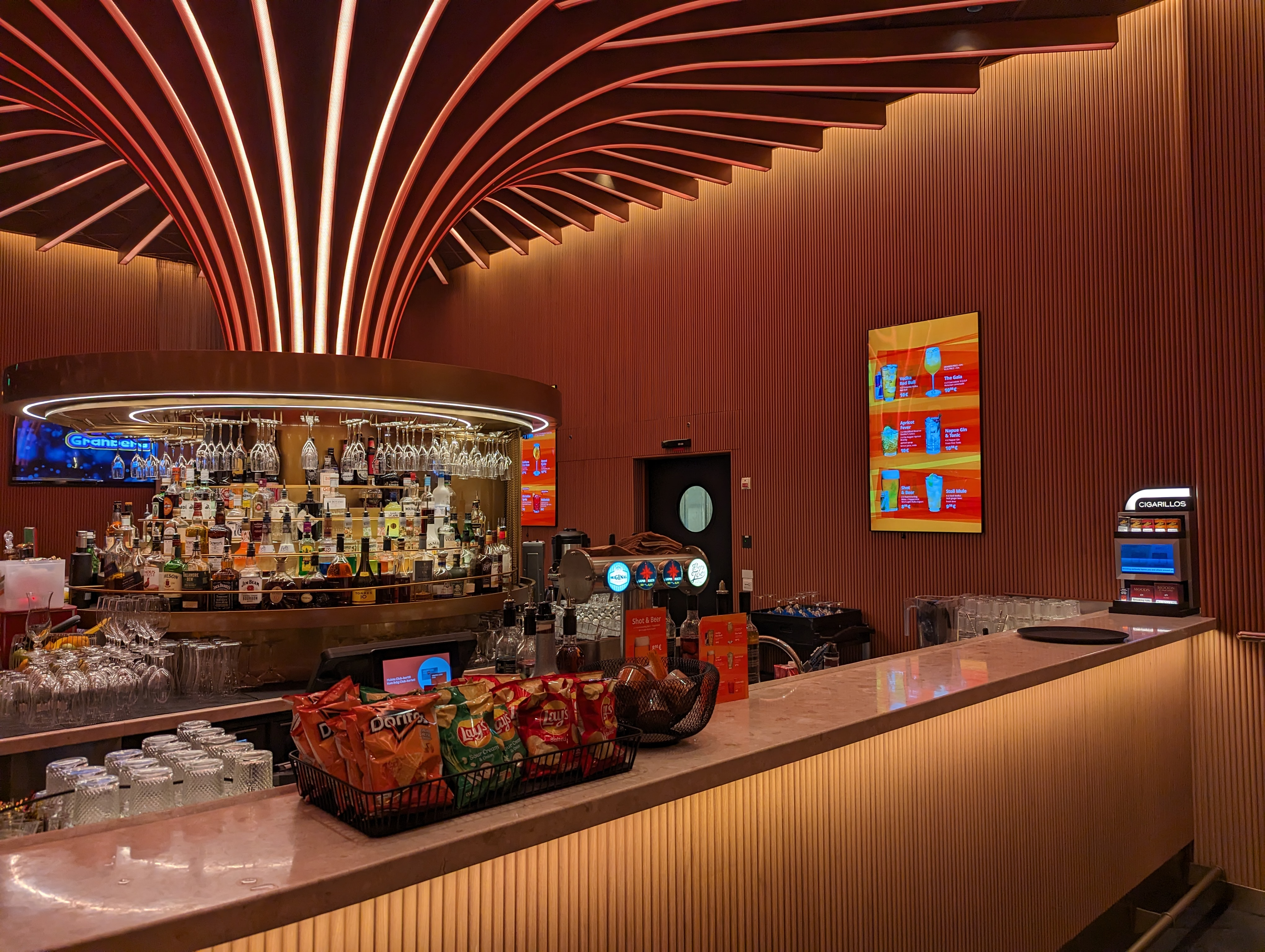
The bar at the Vista room nightclub.

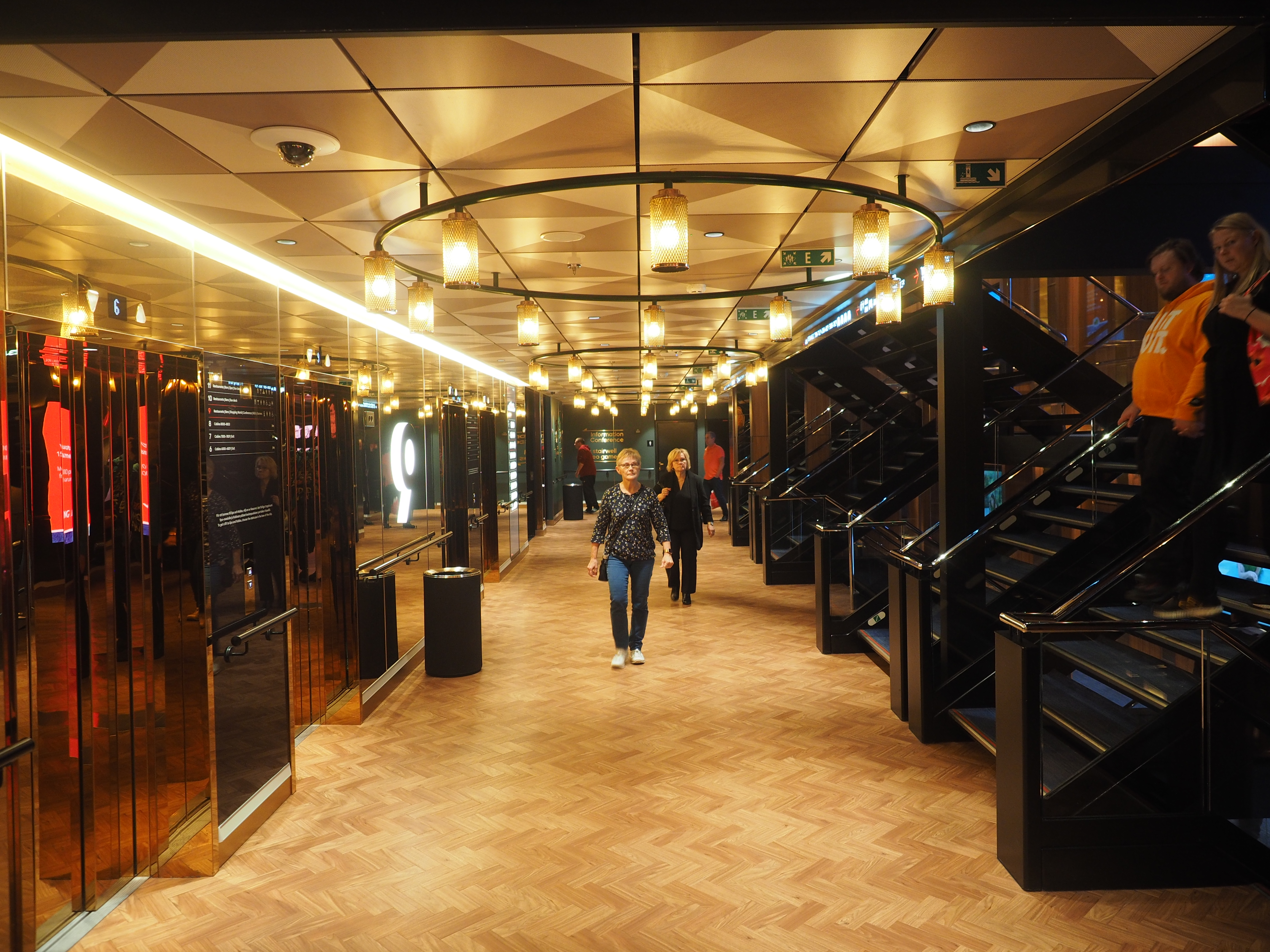
The elevator lobby.

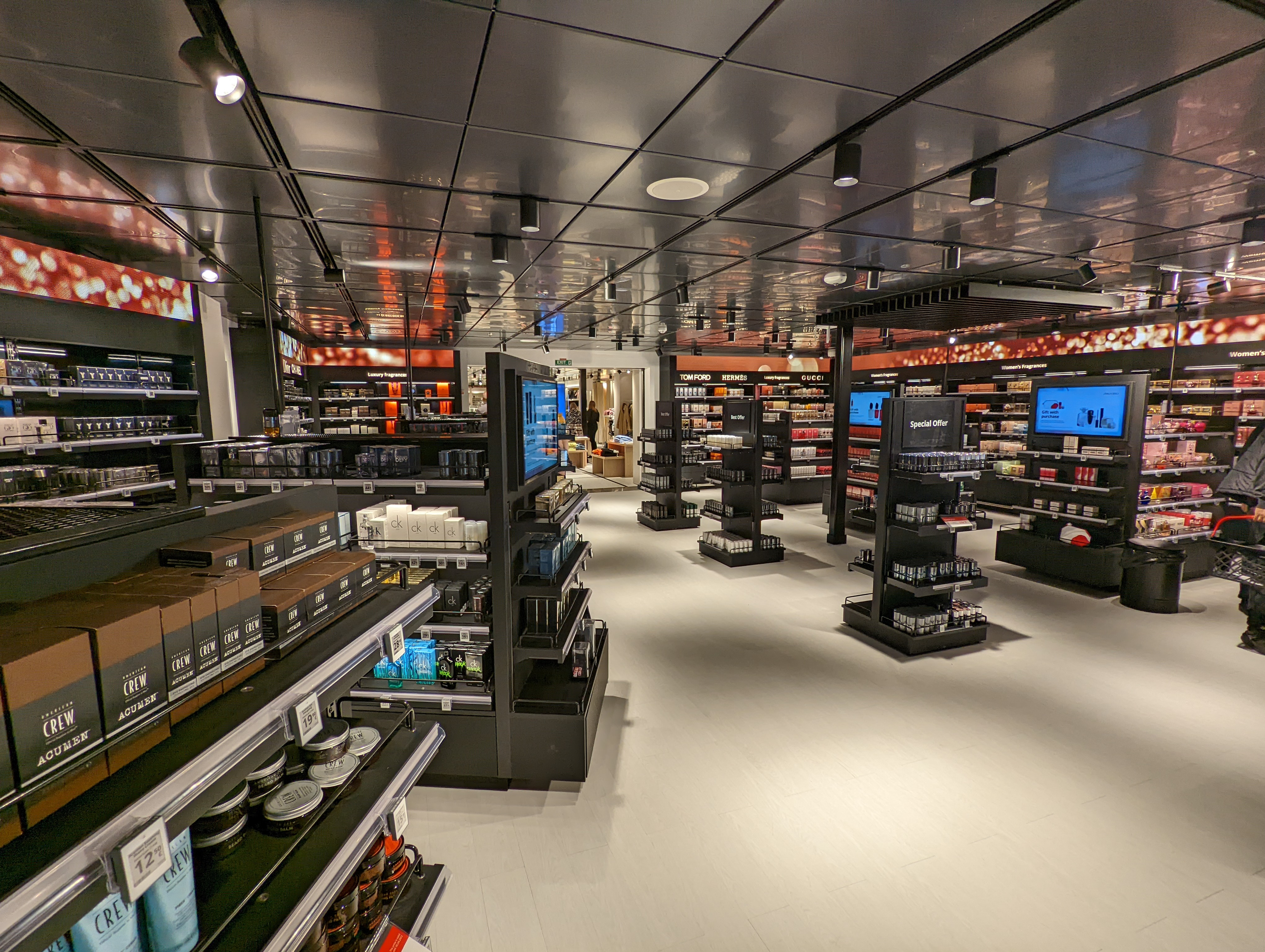
The Tax free shop.

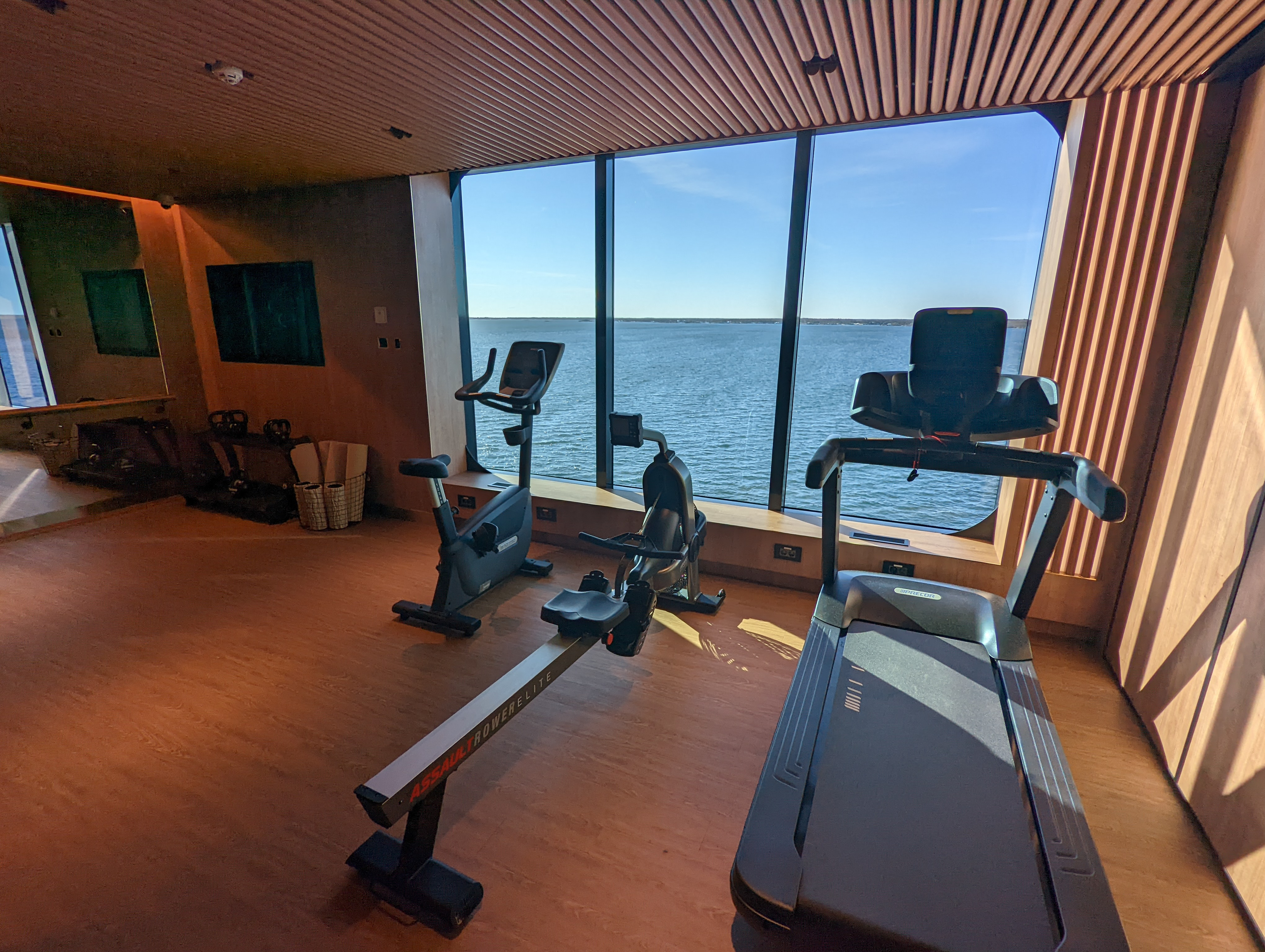
The gym.
