= Rederi Ab Sally =

Finnish shipping company (1937-1990)

- Industry: Shipping
- Founded: 1937
- Founder: Algot Johansson
- Defunct: 1990
- Fate: Merged into EffJohn
- Headquarters: Mariehamn, Åland, Finland
- Products: Tankers, ferries, cruise ships
- Parent: Effoa and Johnson Line (1987–1990)

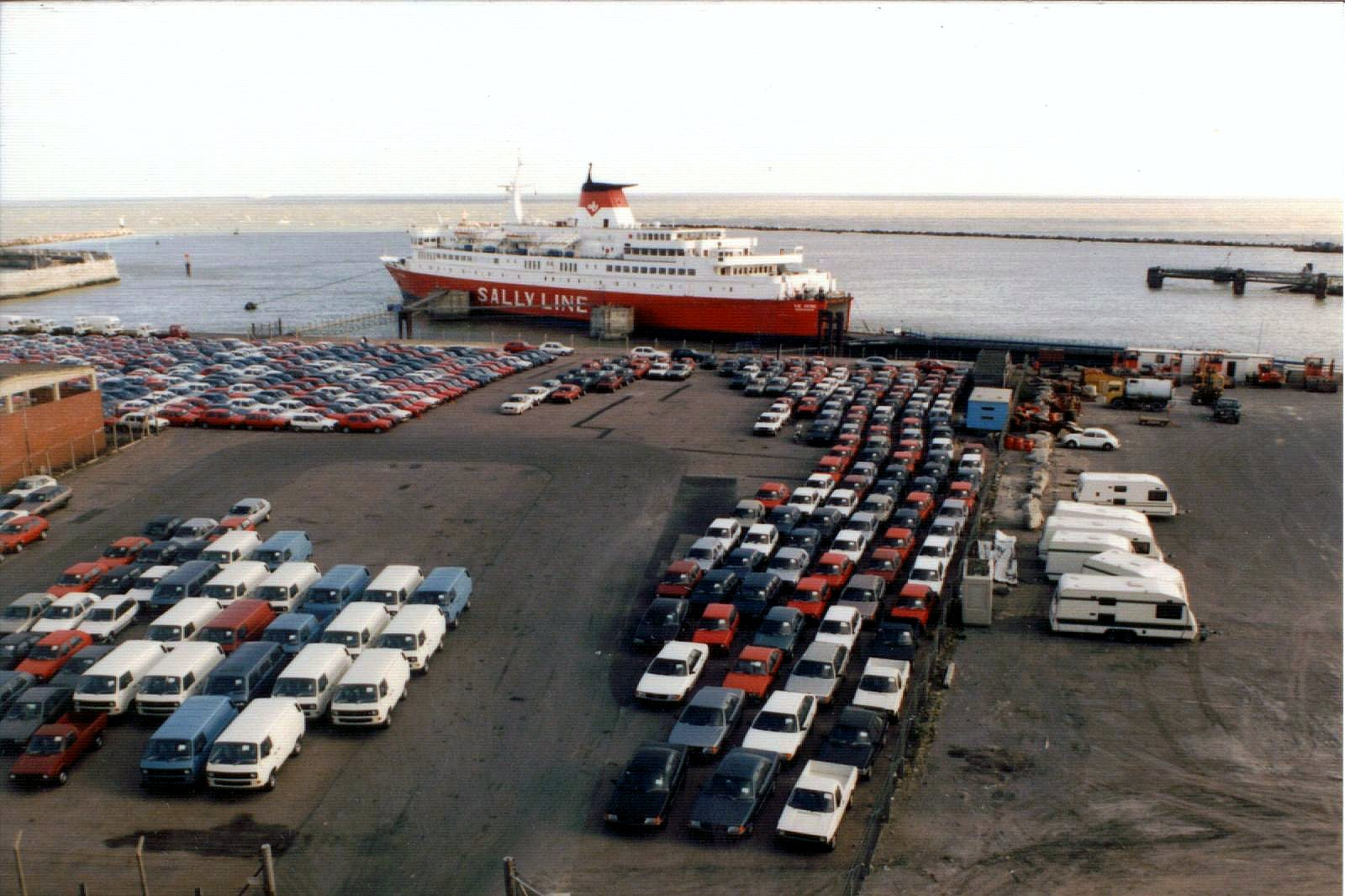
Sally Line vessel in Ramsgate harbour

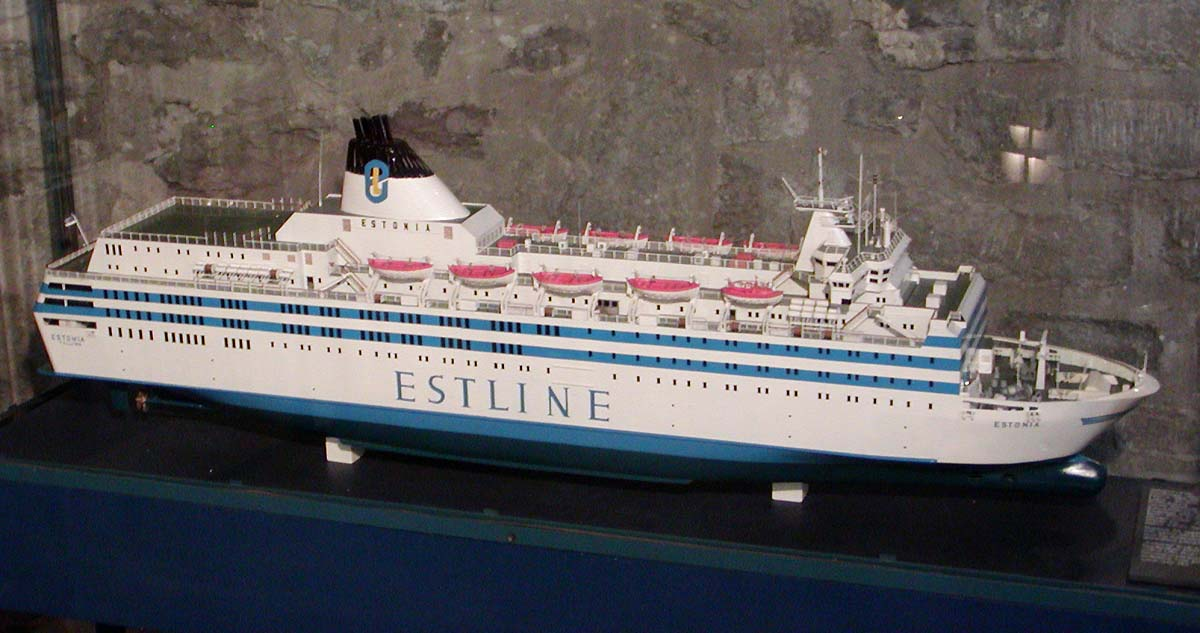
Scale model of MS Estonia, previously MS Viking Sally

Rederi Ab Sally was a Finnish shipping company founded in 1937 by Algot Johansson. The company began as a tanker operator and later became a prominent member of the Viking Line consortium. In 1987, Effoa and Johnson Line, owners of rival Silja Line, acquired Sally. The company finally merged with its parent companies in 1990 to form EffJohn.

== History and operations ==
Sally started with tanker operations before expanding into passenger ferries and cruise ships. The company was a founding member of the Viking Line consortium in 1966 and remained with the group for over two decades. Following the 1987 acquisition by Silja Line's owners, the other Viking Line partners—Rederi AB Slite and SF Line—required Sally to exit the consortium.

== Subsidiaries ==
Sally owned several notable subsidiaries throughout its history:

- Rederi Ab Vikinglinjen / Rederi Ab Solstad – founded 1959, acquired 1963, later merged into Sally in the 1970s
- Commodore Cruise Line – acquired 1980
- Sally Line UK – founded 1981
- Vaasanlaivat / Vasabåtarna – bought from Enso-Gutzeit in 1982
- Sally Cruise – founded 1985, began operations 1986
- Ånedin Linjen – acquired 1986
