= List of ship launches in 1991 =

The list of ship launches in 1991 includes a chronological list of all ships launched in 1991.

Date	Ship	Class / type	Builder	Location	Country	Notes
5 January	Society Adventurer	cruise ship	Rauma-Repola	Rauma	Finland	For Discoverer Reederei
17 January	Hayashio	Harushio-class submarine	Kawasaki Heavy Industries	Kobe	Japan	
23 January	Frans Suell	Cruiseferry	Brodosplit	Split	Yugoslavia	For Sea-Link Shipping for Euroway traffic
2 February	Big Horn	Henry J. Kaiser-class replenishment oiler	Avondale Shipyard	Avondale, Louisiana	United States	
14 February	Littlehales	Survey vessel	Halter Marine, Inc.	Moss Point, Mississippi	United States	Now Thomas Jefferson
16 February	Triumph	Trafalgar-class submarine	Vickers Shipbuilding	Barrow-in-Furness	United Kingdom	
23 February	Essex	Wasp-class amphibious assault ship	Ingalls Shipbuilding	Pascagoula, Mississippi	United States	
2 March	Iron Duke	Type 23 frigate	Yarrow Shipbuilders	Glasgow	United Kingdom	
16 March	Prairial	Floréal-class frigate	Chantiers de l'Atlantique	Saint-Nazaire	France	
23 March	Boise	Los Angeles-class submarine	Newport News Shipbuilding	Newport News, Virginia	United States	
5 April	Sarfaq Ittuk	Cruise ferry	Ørskov Staalskibsværft	Frederikshavn	Denmark	For Arctic Umiaq Line
6 April	Queen of Caopilano	Intermediate-class ferry	Vancouver Shipyards Co. Ltd.	North Vancouver	Canada	
12 April	Seniority	Coaster	Appledore Shipbuilders Ltd.	Appledore	United Kingdom	For Scottish Navigation Co. Ltd.
16 April	Hilligenlei	ferry	Husumer Schiffswerft	Husum	Germany	For Wyker Dampfschiffs-Reederei Föhr-Amrum GmbH
16 May	Ville de Québec	Halifax-class frigate	MIL-Davie Shipbuilding	Lauzon, Quebec	Canada	
18 May	Annapolis	Los Angeles-class submarine	Electric Boat	Groton, Connecticut	United States	
May	Seabourn Legend	Cruise ship	Schichau Seebeckwerft	Bremerhaven	Germany	For Seabourn Cruise Line
8 June	Barry	Arleigh Burke-class destroyer	Ingalls Shipbuilding	Pascagoula, Mississippi	United States	
25 June	Hydra	Hydra-class frigate	Blohm + Voss	Hamburg	Germany	
13 July	Lake Erie	Ticonderoga-class cruiser	Bath Iron Works	Bath, Maine	United States	
25 July	Sally Albatross	Cruise ship	Finnyards	Rauma	Finland	Constructed utilising parts from the first Sally Albatross that burnt in 1990
August	Grosa	missile corvettes	Sredne-Newski	Leningrad	Soviet Union	
1 August	Kosei Maru	Roll-on/roll-off ferry	Kanda Zosencho K.K.	Kawajiri, Japan	Japan	
10 August	Maryland	Ohio-class submarine	Electric Boat	Groton, Connecticut	United States	
11 August	Nivôse	Floréal-class frigate	Chantiers de l'Atlantique	Saint-Nazaire	France	
20 August	ECO	luxury yacht	Blohm + Voss	Hamburg	Germany	
22 August	Saqqit Ittuk	cruise ship	Ørskov Staalskibsværft	Frederikshavn	Denmark	For Umiaq Line
23 August	Montpelier	Los Angeles-class submarine	Newport News Shipbuilding	Newport News, Virginia	United States	
August	Harbin	Type 052 destroyer	Hudong Shipyard	Shanghai	China	
7 September	Vicksburg	Ticonderoga-class cruiser	Ingalls Shipbuilding	Pascagoula, Mississippi	United States	
23 September	Tarquin Glen	LNG tanker	Appledore Shipbuilders Ltd.	Appledore	United Kingdom	For Liquid Gas Shipping Ltd.
26 September	Kongō	Kongō-class destroyer	Mitsubishi Heavy Industries	Nagasaki	Japan	
28 September	Rainier	Supply-class fast combat support ship	National Steel & Shipbuilding	San Diego, California	United States	
5 October	Guadalupe	Henry J. Kaiser-class replenishment oiler	Avondale Shipyard	Avondale, Louisiana	United States	
26 October	John Paul Jones	Arleigh Burke-class destroyer	Bath Iron Works	Bath, Maine	United States	
27 October	Cheng Kung	Cheng Kung-class frigate	China Shipbuilding	Kaohsiung	Taiwan	
9 November	Sarpik Ittuk	cruise ship	Ørskov Staalskibsværft	Frederikshavn	Denmark	For Umiaq Line
15 November	Royal Majesty	Cruise ship	Kvaerner Masa-Yards	Turku	Finland	For Majesty Cruise Line
22 November	Corte-Real	Vasco da Gama-class frigate	HDW	Kiel	Germany	
23 November	Monmouth	Type 23 frigate	Yarrow Shipbuilders	Glasgow	United Kingdom	
6 December	Tone	Abukuma-class destroyer escort	Sumitomo Heavy Industries	Tokyo	Japan	
Unknown date	Avon Monarch	Passenger launch	David Abels Boatbuilders Ltd.	Bristol	United Kingdom	For private owner.
Unknown date	Island Discovery	Ferry	Arklow Marine Services Inc.	Arklow	Ireland	For Paul Concannon & Brian Day.
Unknown date	Knock Allen	Suezmax tanker	Harland & Wolff	Belfast	United Kingdom	For Fred Olsen & Co.
Unknown date	Sea Vigil	Survey ship	David Abels Boatbuilders Ltd.	Bristol	United Kingdom	For Environment Agency.
Unknown date	Vectis	Buoy tender	David Abels Boatbuilders Ltd.	Bristol	United Kingdom	For Trinity House.
Unknown date	Yvonne T	Launch	David Abels Boatbuilders Ltd.	Bristol	United Kingdom	For Wightlink Ltd.
