= Mega Victoria =

Cruiseferry owned by Corsica Ferries

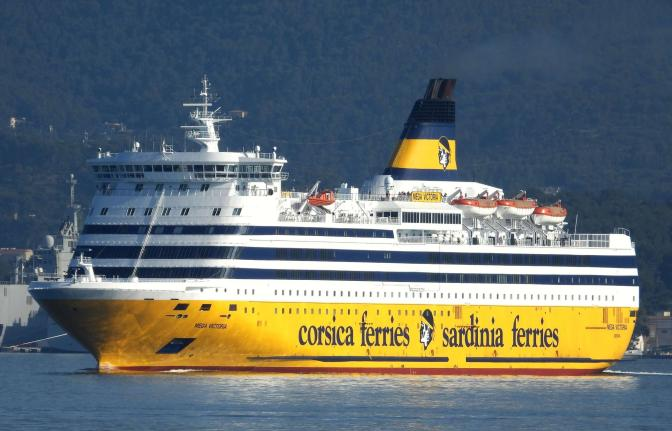
- Mega Victoria at the port of Toulon, 2023

History
- Name: 1988–2022: Amorella; 2022–present: Mega Victoria
- Owner: 1988–1995: SF Line; 1995–2022: Viking Line; 2022–present: Corsica Ferries
- Operator: 1988–1995: SF Line (in Viking Line traffic); 1995–2022: Viking Line; 2022–present: Corsica Ferries
- Port of registry: Genova, Italy
- Route: Savona–Bastia; Nice–Bastia
- Ordered: 3 February 1986
- Builder: Brodosplit, Split, Croatia (Yugoslavia)
- Cost: 280 million FIM (1986)
- Yard number: 356
- Launched: 18 July 1987
- Acquired: 28 September 1988
- In service: 14 October 1988
- Identification: Call sign: IBJA; IMO number: 8601915; MMSI number: 247439700

General characteristics
- Type: cruiseferry
- Tonnage: 34,384 GT; 3,690 DWT
- Length: 169.40 m (555 ft 9 in)
- Beam: 27.60 m (90 ft 7 in)
- Draught: 6.35 m (20 ft 10 in)
- Depth: 13.99 m (45 ft 11 in)
- Decks: 12
- Ice class: 1 A Super
- Installed power: 4 × Wärtsilä-Pielstick 12PC26V-400; 24,000 kW (32,000 hp) (combined)
- Propulsion: Two shafts; controllable pitch propellers
- Speed: 20.5 knots (38.0 km/h; 23.6 mph)
- Capacity: 2,420 passengers; 1,986 berths; 450 cars; 970 lanemeters

Mega Victoria is a cruiseferry owned by Corsica Ferries. She was formerly owned by Viking Line as Amorella and operated on the route Turku–Mariehamn–Stockholm and from 2022 Helsinki–Mariehamn–Stockholm. She was built in 1988 by Brodosplit in Croatia, then Yugoslavia.

Mega Victoria has three sister ships: Isabelle X operated by Bridgemans, Gabriella operated by Viking Line and Nordic Crown, operated by Go Nordic Cruise Line.

== History ==
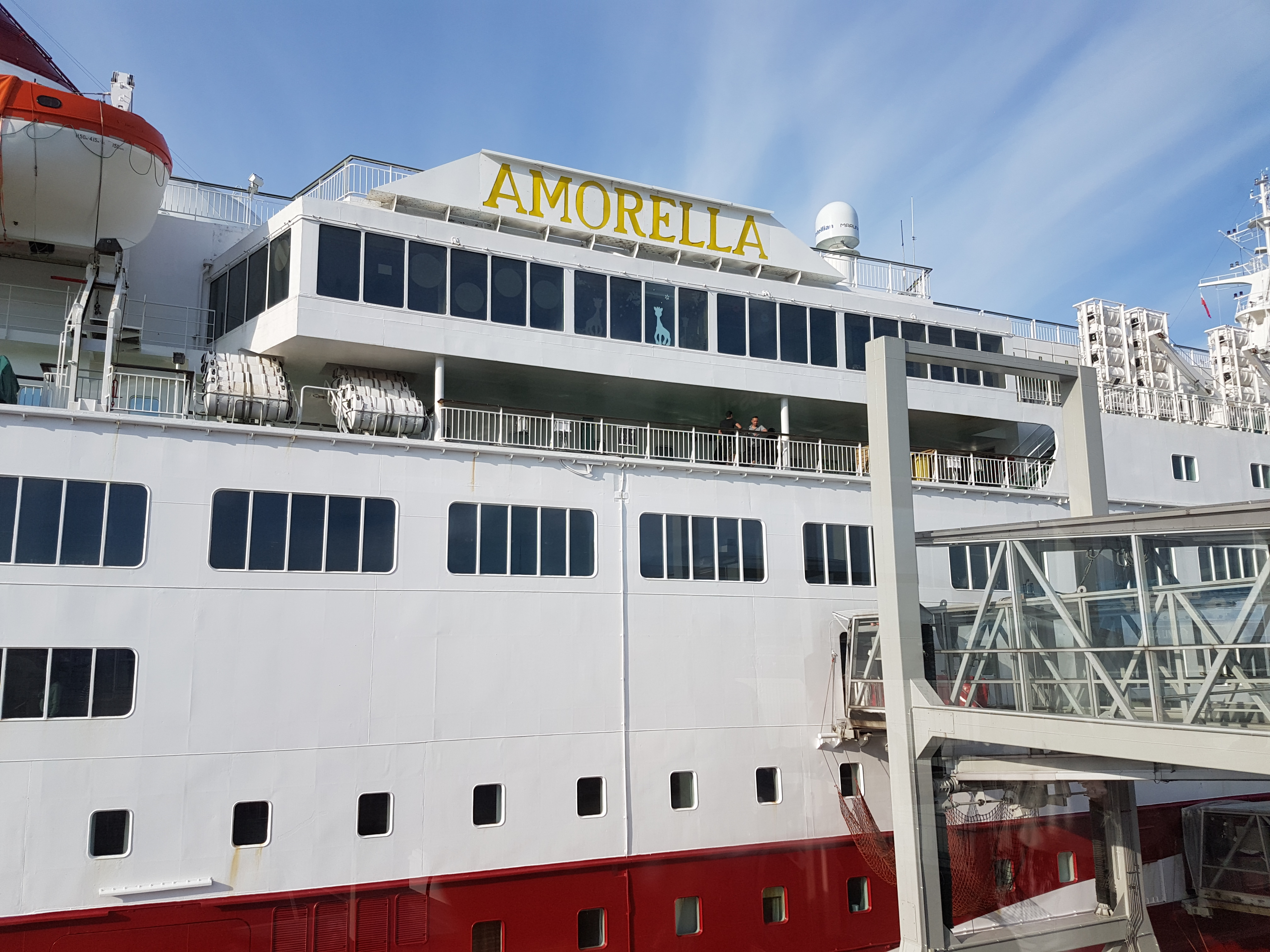
In Turku Harbor before a voyage to Stockholm

Amorella was ordered in 1986 by SF Line, one of the partners in Viking Line consortium. Although Brodosplit outbid other shipyards, the Finnish State offered to subsidise construction of the ship if she was built at a Finnish shipyard. This was a common practice in the 1980s to bring more jobs to Finland, but this time SF Line declined and had the ship built in Yugoslavia. The original planned delivery date for Amorella was in March 1988, but due to delays in construction she was not completed until September, which meant SF Line was forced to operate the lucrative summer season with old tonnage.

Except for short periods of time in 1997, 1998 and 2002, Amorella has always served on the Turku–Mariehamn/Långnäs–Stockholm route, making her the longest-lasting ship on that route. Originally she only called in Mariehamn during day crossing, but in July 1999 she had to start calling at the Åland Islands in both directions to maintain tax free sales on board, and as a result a call at Långnäs was added to the night crossing.

In 1993 the ship ran aground near Stockholm. She was able to come off by her own power, but her bottom was damaged in the process; she started taking in water and diesel oil leaked from a damaged fuel tank. The ship continued to Stockholm, and after unloading passengers and cargo she sailed to Turku Repair Yard, Naantali for repairs. In 1995, and again in 2001, there was a fire in one of the cabins but the ship's own firefighters managed to put it out. In May 2005 there was a fire in a car parked on the cardeck on Deck 5, but that too was put out by the ship's crew. In March 2010, the ship had to be rescued by ice breakers after becoming stranded in thick ice along with several other vessels. During this stranding, Amorella collided with the Finnlines ship Finnfellow which resulted in a large dent on the port side hull. Nobody was injured in the collision.

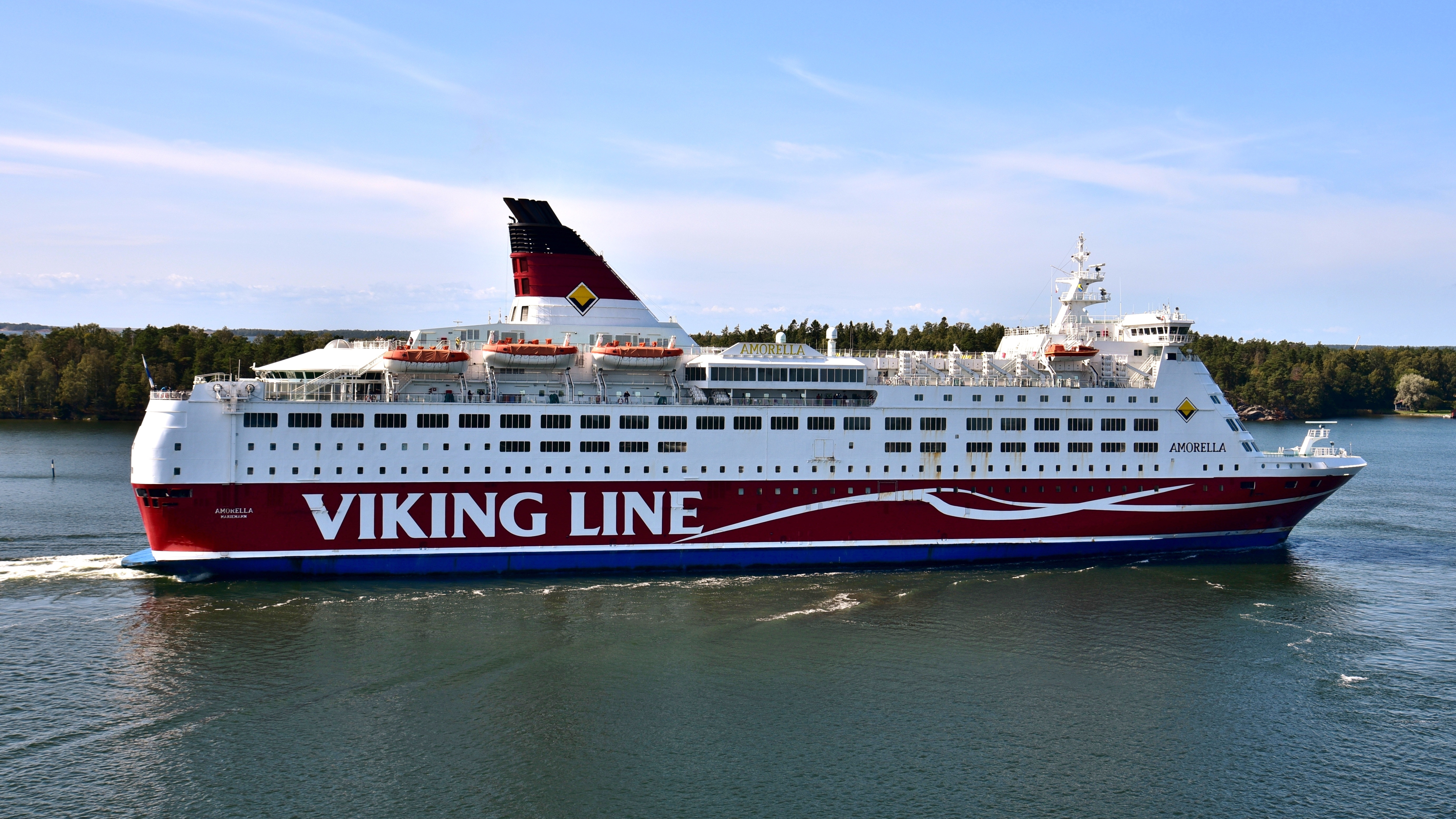
Arriving at Mariehamn from Turku, 2019

On 14 December 2013, Amorella lost her steering due to a blackout and ran aground with about 2,000 passengers on board. The only hull damage that occurred was a breach into a bow ballast tank. Therefore, no environmental damage occurred and there was no leak into the vessel. After being stuck for about twelve hours she was able continue her journey to Mariehamn under her own power.

In January 2017, Viking Line announced that they would put Amorella up for sale when its new ship, Viking Glory was delivered. On 20 September 2020, Amorella contacted the bottom with 207 passengers and 74 crew aboard. The ship was intentionally run aground to stabilize the vessel. Viking Glory replaced Amorella on the Turku–Stockholm route in 2022. Since no buyers emerged, Viking Line announced on 26 January 2022 that Amorella instead would join her sister Gabriella on the Helsinki–Stockholm route. Amorella started this service on 1 April 2022.

In August 2022 the ship was sold to Corsica Ferries and renamed Mega Victoria. Mega Victoria was subjected to extensive renovations starting in October 2022 and returned to service in 2023. It was the second ship Corsica Ferries buys from Viking Line, the first being Mega Regina, bought in 2021.
