= Stena Paris =

History
- Name: Stena Paris
- Owner: CM P-Max 1
- Operator: Bermuda, Bermuda
- Builder: Brodosplit
- Launched: 4 June 2005
- Identification: IMO number: 9299123; MMSI number: 310486000
- Status: In service

General characteristics
- Class & type: Oil and chemical tanker
- Tonnage: 36,064 GT; 36,064 NT; 65,125 DWT
- Length: 182.90 m (600 ft 1 in)
- Beam: 40.00 m (131 ft 3 in)
- Draft: 12.00 m (39 ft 4 in)
- Depth: 17.90 m (58 ft 9 in)
- Installed power: 21,000 hp (16,000 kW) at 129 rpm
- Propulsion: MAN B&W 6S46MC-C
- Capacity: 70,200 m^{3} (442,000 bbl)

Stena Paris is a chemical tanker owned and operated by CM P-Max 1. The cargo ship was built in 2005 at Brodosplit, Croatia. The vessel is assessed at 65,125 tons deadweight (DWT) and 36,064 gross tonnage (GT). The chemical tanker Stena Paris is large and has improved capacity for cargo on board. The net tonnage is 36,064 NT and on board there are ten cargo tanks with capacity for 70,200 m^{3} (442,000 bbl).

== Details ==
The ship's main engines are two MAN B&W 6S46MC-C with total power of 21,000 hp (16,000 kW). In addition on board there are four diesel generators MAN B&W 7L23/30H, which support the propulsion system and cargo handling equipment. The cargo system consists of ten cargo deepwell pumps. All of the pumps have capacity 800 cubic metres (28,000 cu ft) per hour. The heating system on board contains three heating coils SS SUS316L.

== Incidents ==
On 6 August 2014 the crew of Stena Paris entered into the news by saving an elderly Swedish couple from their dismastedyacht near the Cook Islands. The Rescue Coordination Centre New Zealand (RCCNZ) detected a beacon alert from the yacht Blue Horizon. The couple, a 69-year-old woman and 70-old-man, feared the broken mast would hole the hull. The chemical tanker was close to the accident and saved the two seafarers.
