= Isabelle X =

Cruiseferry built in 1989

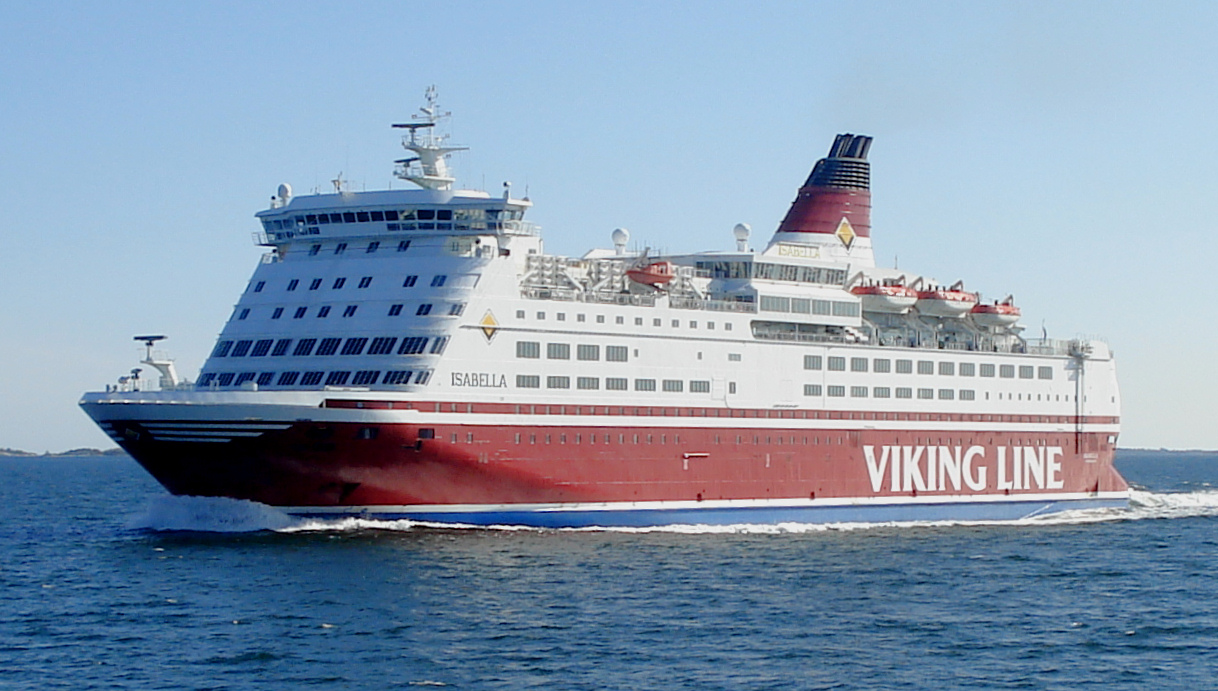
- Isabella in the Archipelago Sea, 19 May 2008

History
- Name: Isabella (1989–2013); Isabelle (2013–2024); Isabelle X (2024– )
- Owner: 1989–95: SF Line; 1995–2013: Viking Line; 2013–2023: Tallink; 2024–present: Notamare Shipping
- Port of registry: Mariehamn, Finland (1989–2013); Riga, Latvia (2013–2023); Squamish, Canada (2023-onwards)
- Route: charter
- Ordered: 4 February 1986
- Builder: Brodosplit, Split, Croatia (Yugoslavia)
- Yard number: 357
- Laid down: 15 September 1987
- Launched: 13 August 1988
- Christened: 5 June 1989
- Acquired: 15 June 1989
- In service: 4 July 1989
- Identification: Call sign: CFA4275; IMO number: 8700723; MMSI number: 275430000
- Status: In service

General characteristics (as built)
- Type: Cruiseferry, Passenger/Ro-Ro Cargo Ship
- Tonnage: 34,386 GT; 3,680 DWT
- Length: 169.40 m (555 ft 9 in)
- Beam: 27.61 m (90 ft 7 in)
- Draught: 6.26 m (20 ft 6 in)
- Decks: 12
- Ice class: 1 A Super
- Installed power: 4 × Wärtsilä-Pielstick 12PC2.6V-400e; 24,000 kW (combined)
- Propulsion: Two shafts; controllabe-pitch propellers
- Speed: 21.5 knots (39.8 km/h; 24.7 mph)
- Capacity: 2,200 passengers; 1,983 passenger berths; 410 cars; 970 lanemetres

General characteristics (after 2007 refit)
- Tonnage: 35,154 GT; 20,682 NT; 3,680 DWT
- Length: 169.40 m (555 ft 9 in)
- Beam: 28.2 m (92 ft 6 in)
- Draught: 6.35 m (20 ft 10 in)
- Depth: 14.05 m (46 ft 1 in)
- Capacity: 2,480 passengers; 2,166 passenger berths; 364 cars; 850 lanemetres
- Notes: Otherwise the same as built

Isabelle X is a cruiseferry owned and operated until July 2023 by the Estonian based Tallink and in January 2024 sold to Notamare Shipping. She was built in 1989 by Brodosplit in Split, Yugoslavia, for SF Line—one of the partners in the Viking Line consortium—as Isabella. The ship served as refugee housing in Tallinn until 1 July 2023.

Isabelle has three sister ships, one in the Viking Line fleet, Gabriella, one in the Corsica Ferries fleet, Mega Victoria and one operated by DFDS Seaways, Crown Seaways.

== Concept and construction ==
Isabella was the second of two sister ships ordered by SF Line from Brodosplit in Split, SFR Yugoslavia for Viking Line service (the first sister being Amorella). Order for Isabella was placed on 4 February 1986, her keel was laid on 15 September 1987, and she was launched on 13 August 1988. She has twelve decks. Delivery to SF Line took place on 15 June 1989, and on 20 June 1989 the ship left Yugoslavia for Finland.

== Service history ==
Prior to entering service Isabella visited Pori, Finland where the ship was displayed to the public on 3 July 1989. She had originally been planned to replace Rosella on the Naantali–Mariehamn–Kapellskär route, but the authorities of Kapellskär failed to modernise the port of the town to accommodate a ship of such large size. As a result, when delivered the ship was placed on a new Naantali–Stockholm route for the Northern Hemisphere summer season, and 24-hour cruises from Helsinki for the rest of the year.

In spring 1992 the ship was rebuilt at Naantali with a new skybar on deck 11, new cabins in place of the former second car deck on deck 5 and her livery was slightly altered by the addition of a red stripe running along the windows of deck 6. After the 1992 summer season SF Line decided to terminate the Naantali–Stockholm service and the Isabella was placed on the Helsinki cruise route all year round. In summer 1993 she made a handful of cruises from Helsinki to Visby. After the 1994 summer season Isabella swapped routes with Cinderella and served Helsinki–Stockholm for the next three years. During the summer of 1996, instead of spending the day in Helsinki she made short 'picnic' cruises to Tallinn. These proved to be unprofitable and were terminated after the single season.

In 1997 Viking Line placed Isabella's newly purchased sister Gabriella on the Helsinki–Stockholm route and Isabella joined Amorella on the Turku–Mariehamn–Stockholm route. After this Isabella has occasionally sailed on the Helsinki route when the normal ships of that route have been docked. She was rebuilt with rear sponsons at Naantali in 2000.

In September 2007 the ship was again docked at Naantali. Her tax-free shop, pub and disco were completely rebuilt, and two restaurants based on new concepts replaced two earlier restaurants. Viking Line had plans to refurbish all of the ship's cabins as a part of their large-scale fleet rebuilding programme.

In January 2013, Isabella was replaced by the newbuilding Viking Grace. She then temporarily replaced the docked Amorella from 16 January to 11 February. After that she was laid up in Turku awaiting her entrance on the Helsinki–Tallinn route for the summer season starting in May 2013. This was in case no buyer for her was found. Since the summer of 2012, Isabella was on sale on the international market.

On 5 April 2013, Viking Line announced that Isabella has been sold to the competitor Tallink. This meant that Isabella will not sail on the Helsinki–Tallinn route as originally planned. According to the CEO, "some 10 000 bookings" were affected by this but they were all compensated. Isabella replaced Silja Festival on the Stockholm–Riga route.

In April 2013, Isabella was renamed Isabelle and her port of registry was changed to Riga, Latvia. From late April 2013 until 5 May 2013, she was in Tallinn for maintenance and repainting. On 6 May she made her first voyage on the Riga–Stockholm route.

In April 2014, on board a passenger was found dead from unknown causes.

Since April 2022, the ship is acting as temporary accommodation for 1,500 refugees fleeing the Russian invasion of Ukraine.

In January 2024 it was relocated to Canada to serve as a floatel for workers at the Woodfibre LNG project. In the same month the ship was sold to Notamare Shipping.
