= Nordic Crown =

1994-built Danish-flagged cruiseferry owned by Swedish Gotlandsbolaget

- Nordic Crown in Oslo on December 30, 2025

History
- Name: Nordic Crown
- Owner: Gotlandsbolaget 2024-; DFDS Seaways 1994-2024; Euroways 1994-1994
- Operator: Gotlandsbolaget 2024-; DFDS Seaways 1994-2024
- Route: Copenhagen–Oslo; Frederikshavn-Oslo
- Builder: Brodosplit, Split, Croatia
- Launched: 6 April 1992
- Completed: 11 June 1994; Rebuilt: 2005
- Identification: IMO number: 8917613
- Status: In service

General characteristics
- Type: Cruiseferry
- Tonnage: 35,498 GT
- Length: 171.5 m (562.7 ft)
- Beam: 28.2 m (92.5 ft)
- Draft: 6.25 m (20.5 ft)
- Decks: 12
- Ice class: 1 A Super
- Propulsion: 4 × Pielstick diesel engines; 23,760 kW
- Speed: 21.5 knots (39.8 km/h; 24.7 mph)
- Capacity: 2,136 passengers; 450 vehicles

Nordic Crown is a cruiseferry operated by Gotlandsbolaget on a route connecting Copenhagen & Frederikshavn in Denmark to Oslo, Norway. The ship was built in 1994 by Brodosplit in Split, Croatia. She was originally ordered by Euroway and was to be called Frans Kockum but never sailed under that name. The ship was also temporarily renamed Thomas Mann during construction. She first sailed under the name Crown of Scandinavia, then Crown Seaways.

Nordic Crown has three sister ships: Mega Victoria (previously Amorella) in the Corsica Ferries fleet, Gabriella in the Viking Line fleet and Isabelle in the Tallink fleet.

== History ==
Euroway originally planned to operate two cruiseferries on a route connecting Malmö, Sweden to Travemünde, Germany. To achieve that two identical cruiseferries were ordered from Brodosplit, Croatia, to be called Frans Suell and Frans Kockum. The ships were a somewhat enlarged version of Amorella and Isabella that the shipyard had built for SF Line in 1988 and 1989, respectively. Due to the Croatian War of Independence the delivery of Frans Suell was delayed by nearly a year, from 1991 to 1992. Poor profitability of the route, further delays in construction of the second ship and a joint operations agreement with Silja Line made Euroway decide to cancel the order for Frans Kockum.

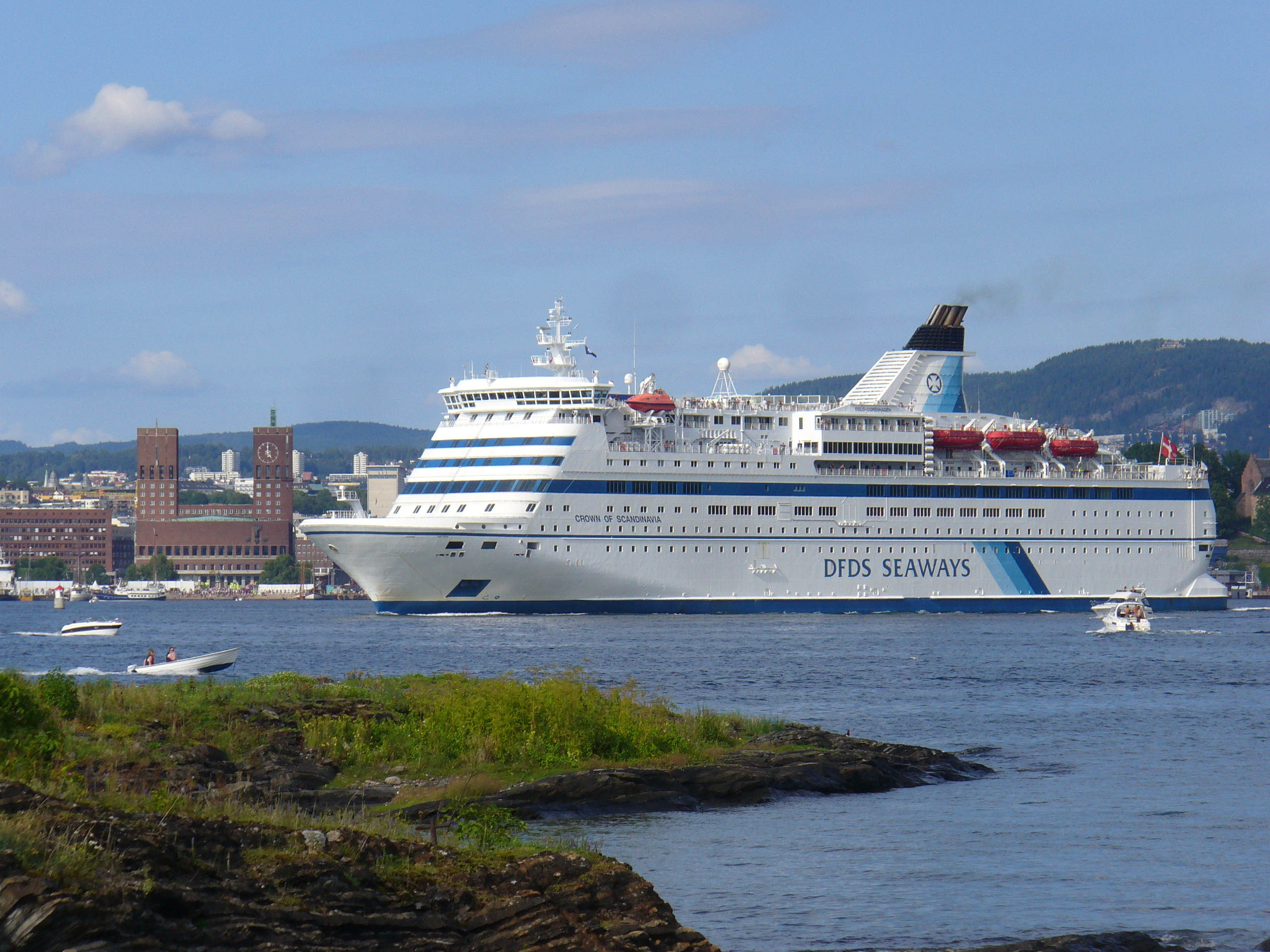
The Crown of Scandinavia in its former livery, departing Oslo (2010).

After the order was cancelled, the ship was renamed Thomas Mann and work on her was continued, but at a more leisurely pace. In March 1994 the Thomas Mann sailed from the shipyard in Split to the Fincantieri shipyard at Trieste, Italy for minor modifications. On 2 May 1994 DFDS made a tentative agreement to purchase the ship, and bought her ten days later. The ship was finally delivered on 11 June 1994. From Trieste she sailed to Lloyd Werft, Bremerhaven, Germany, where stern sponsons were added to the ship for increased stability.

On 26 July the ship was renamed Crown of Scandinavia and began sailing on Scandinavian Seaways (a marketing name for DFDS passenger operations) Copenhagen — Helsingborg — Oslo -service. In 1999 the company name reverted to DFDS Seaways.

In January 2005 the ship was rebuilt at Öresundsvarvet, Landskrona, Sweden. On 15 October 2006 the call at Helsingborg was dropped from the route in order to cut down fuel and pilot expenses.

In July 2020 and after a break of 46 years, Frederikshavn was introduced as a port of call in both directions.

In late 2024, DFDS sold the Copenhagen-Oslo route and ships to Gotlandsbolaget, and the ship was subsequently renamed Nordic Crown in early 2025.

=== 2014 engine incident ===
On 27 April 2014, the vessel experienced engine problems near the Danish island of Anholt, whilst travelling from Copenhagen towards Oslo. It is reported that passengers heard a loud bang, a shudder and smoke at about 21:30, when the vessel suffered an engine failure and crank explosion. The ship soon continued on its way towards Oslo. The cause of the incident is unknown.
