= Euroway =

Swedish ferry company

- Founded: 1992
- Defunct: 1994
- Fate: Dissolved
- Headquarters: Malmö, Sweden
- Area served: Germany, Sweden, Denmark
- Services: Passenger transportation, Freight transportation

Euroway was a Swedish ferry company that operated cruise ferries between Sweden and Germany from 1992 till 1994. The company was founded by Norwegian businessman Elling Ellingsen with the goal of providing a cruise ship-style experience between Malmö and Lübeck.

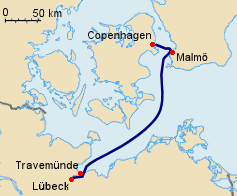
Euroway's route as of 1993.

== History ==
Founded by the Norwegian businessman, Elling Ellingsen, owner of Sea-Link Shipping AB, with the objective to set up cruiseferry connections between the cities of Malmö in Sweden and Lübeck in Germany. Euroway's business concept was to provide a cruise ship-style experience.

Euroway planned to open their service in mid-1991, however the first of two large car and passenger ferries ordered from the Brodogradiliste Split shipyard in Croatia, was delayed because of the Yugoslav wars. The first ship, M/S Frans Suell, was not delivered until May 1992. The start was troublesome; it was for a long time unclear when scheduled traffic would begin and marketing was poorly executed. On May 19, Frans Suell made her first trip from Malmö to Travemünde. On September 1, the route was extended to Lübeck with a one way trip from Malmö to Lübeck via Travemünde taking approximately 15 hours. Due to a request from the city of Lübeck to avoid additional traffic congestion, Euroway had to stop in Travemünde to let boarded cars off. Euroway's main target groups were cruise and conference passengers and initially no trucks were carried.

A sister ship for Frans Suell was initially ordered, but delays at the shipyard and poor profitability made Euroway cancel its order later on. If the ship would have been delivered to Euroway its name would have been M/S Frans Kockum. The shipyard continued working on the ship and eventually sold it to the shipping company DFDS. Euroway speculated in chartering the Viking Line ship M/S Olympia from Rederi AB Slite, but the deal did not go through.

Due to management problems and the economic situation in Europe, Sea Link AB was by 1993 looking for a partner for Euroway. Silja Line joined Euroway and the company changed its name to Silja Line Euroway with Silja's Silja Festival being added as a second ship. A major factor in the teamup of Silja and Euroway was Swedish Nordbanken, which was a major funder of both Silja and Euroway. In September the Euroway route was extended to Copenhagen - Malmö - Travemünde - Lübeck, and trucks were now allowed on board. On 12 March 1994 the Euroway service was cancelled due to lack of passengers and Silja Line's financial problems.

== Timetables ==
May 19, 1992 - August 31, 1992
Using M/S Frans Suell (daily)
Travemünde		Malmö
10:00	→		18:00
07:00		←	21:00

June 1, 1993 - August 31, 1993
Using M/S Frans Suell and M/S Silja Festival (daily)
Travemünde		Malmö
10:00	→		18:00
07:00		←	21:00
21:00	→		07:00
18:00		←	10:00

September 1, 1992 - May 31, 1993
Using M/S Frans Suell (every second day from each port)
Lübeck		Travemünde			Malmö
18:00	→		21:00	→		09:00
09:00		←	07:00		←	18:00

September 1, 1993 - March 12, 1994
Using M/S Frans Suell and M/S Silja Festival (daily)
Lübeck		Travemünde			Malmö			Copenhagen
18:00	→		20:00	→		08:30	→		11:00
09:30		←	07:00		←	18:00		←	16:00

== Fleet ==
- M/S Frans Suell (1992–1994)
- M/S Silja Festival (1993–1994)
- M/S Frans Kockum (cancelled order)

== External links and references ==
- The Euroway Memory Page
