= Mega Andrea =

1985 ship

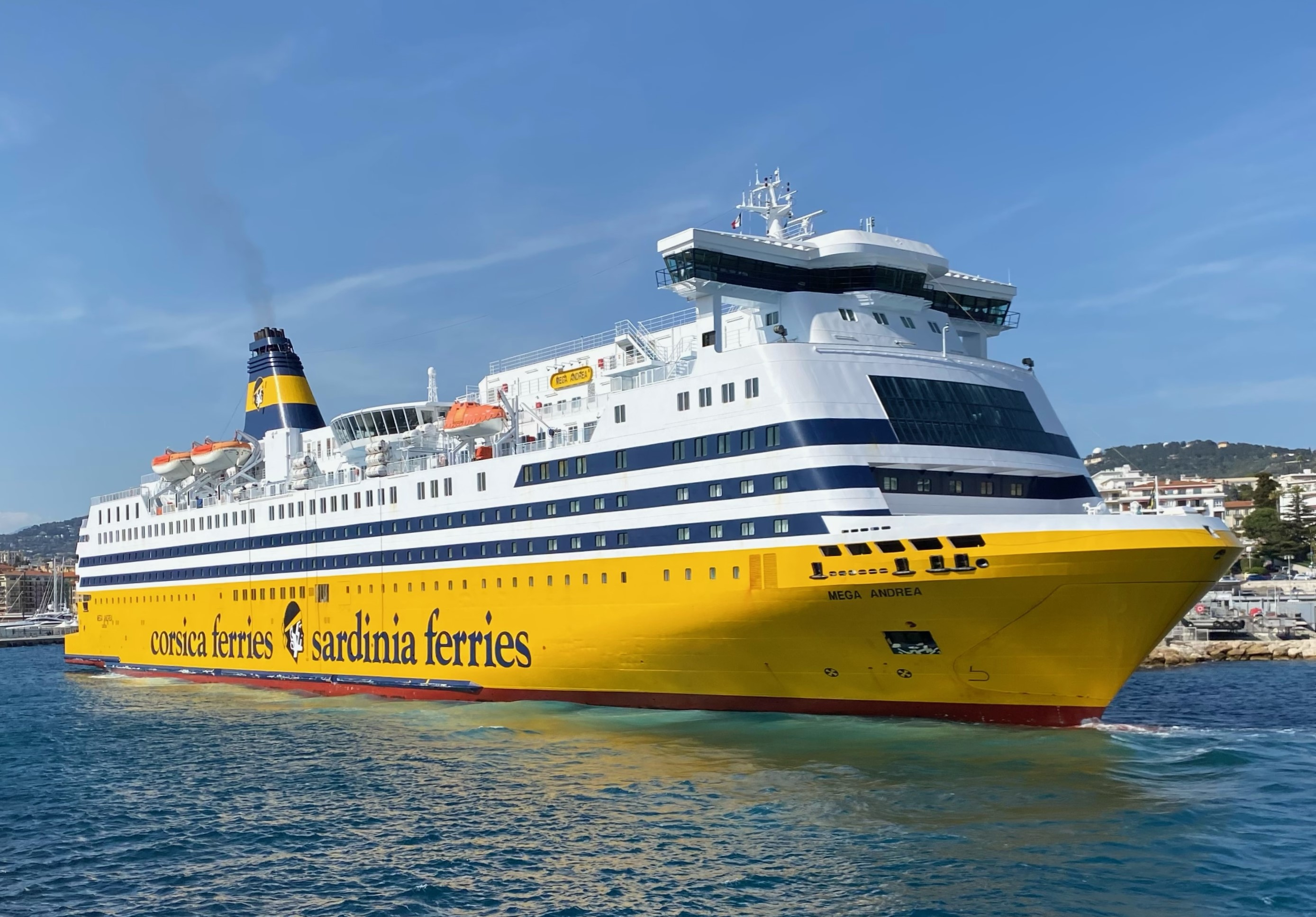
- Mega Andrea at Nice in 2022

History
- Name: 1986–1992: Wellamo; 1992–2015: Silja Festival; 2015–present: Mega Andrea
- Owner: 1986–1991: Effoa; 1991–1992: EffJohn; 1992–2006: Silja Line; 2006–2015: Tallink Group; 2015–present: Forship S.p.A.
- Operator: 1986–2008: Silja Line; 2008–2015: Tallink; 2015–present: Corsica Ferries Sardinia Ferries
- Port of registry: 1986–1992: Helsinki, Finland; 1992–1997: Mariehamn, Finland; 1997–2008: Stockholm, Sweden; 2008–2015: Riga, Latvia; 2015–present: Genova, Italy
- Route: -
- Ordered: 1983-04-13
- Builder: Wärtsilä Helsinki Shipyard, Helsinki, Finland
- Yard number: 471
- Laid down: 1984-05-22
- Launched: 1985-03-15
- Christened: 1986-01-09 by Pirkko Työläjärvi
- Completed: 1986
- Acquired: 1986-01-09
- Maiden voyage: 1986-01-09
- In service: 1986-01-09
- Identification: IMO number: 8306498
- Status: In service

General characteristics (as built)
- Type: Cruiseferry
- Tonnage: 33,818 GT; 3,000 DWT
- Length: 168.00 m (551 ft 2 in)
- Beam: 27.60 m (90 ft 7 in)
- Draught: 6.50 m (21 ft 4 in)
- Depth: 14.45 m (47 ft 5 in)
- Ice class: 1 A Super
- Installed power: 4 × Wärtsilä-SEMT-Pielstick 12PC 2-6V; combined 26,200 kW (35,100 hp)
- Propulsion: 2 propellers; 2 bow thrusters; 1 stern thruster
- Speed: 22 knots (41 km/h; 25 mph)
- Capacity: 2,000 passengers; 1,625 berths; 1,200 lanemeters; 360 cars

General characteristics (after 1992 rebuilt)
- Tonnage: 34,417 GT; 3,720 DWT
- Capacity: 1,886 passengers; 1,937 berths; 300 cars
- Notes: Otherwise the same as built MS Silja Europa

Mega Andrea is a cruiseferry owned and operated by Corsica Ferries Sardinia Ferries. She was formerly owned and operated by the Estonia-based Tallink as the Silja Festival, and used on their route connecting Riga, Latvia to Stockholm, Sweden. She was built in 1986 by Wärtsilä Helsinki Shipyard, Finland, for Effoa as Wellamo for use on Silja Line traffic. She was rebuilt in 1992 at Lloyds Werft, Bremerhaven, Germany as Silja Festival. In 2008 the ship was transferred from the Silja Line fleet to that of Tallink, but she retained her Silja-prefixed name. After being replaced by Isabelle on the Stockholm-Riga route in May 2013 she was chartered as an accommodation ship to Kitimat, British Columbia. She was then sold in early 2015 to Corsica Ferries.

== History ==
=== Wellamo ===
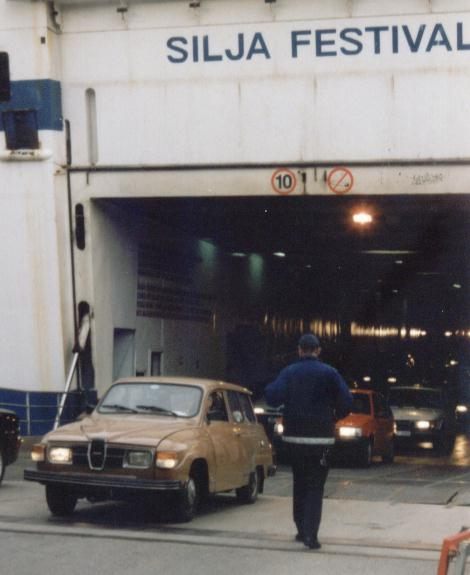
Silja Festival unloading in Turku, August 2001

Following the delivery of Finlandia and Silvia Regina for Silja Line's Helsinki–Stockholm service, Johnson Line and Effoa decided to order a pair of ships based on a similar design for the Turku–Stockholm service. The first of the new ships, named Svea, was delivered to Johnson Line in May 1985. The ship built for Effoa was given the name Wellamo (after the goddess of the sea in Finnish mythology, a traditional name in Effoa fleet) and delivered in January 1986. Following delivery she was placed on the Stockholm–Mariehamn–Turku route.

The Wellamo suffered her first major mishap in July of the same year when she suffered a blackout and was grounded near Mariehamn. Following the grounding she was repaired at Luonnonmaan Telakka, Naantali, Finland. In 1989 plans were made for converting the ship to a combined car/passenger/train ferry, but these were abandoned. In the summer of 1990 the Wellamo briefly served on the Helsinki–Stockholm route, because the new Silja Serenade was not yet complete, but old Finlandia had to be delivered to her new owners DFDS. During the same year Effoa and Johnson Line merged to form EffJohn, who now became the sole owners of Silja Line.

In the early 1990s EffJohn planned a large-scale reconstruction of GTS Finnjet. However the company could not gather enough funds to realise this project. Instead the money was used to rebuild the Svea and Wellamo. In 1992, Wellamo was docked and rebuild at Lloyds Werft, Bremerhaven, Germany. Most notable exterior changes were a new skybar in front of the funnel and a new, more blue-dominated livery. Following the reconstruction the Wellamo was renamed Silja Festival (her sister having become Silja Karneval). Around the same time her homeport was changed from Helsinki to Mariehamn.

=== Silja Festival ===
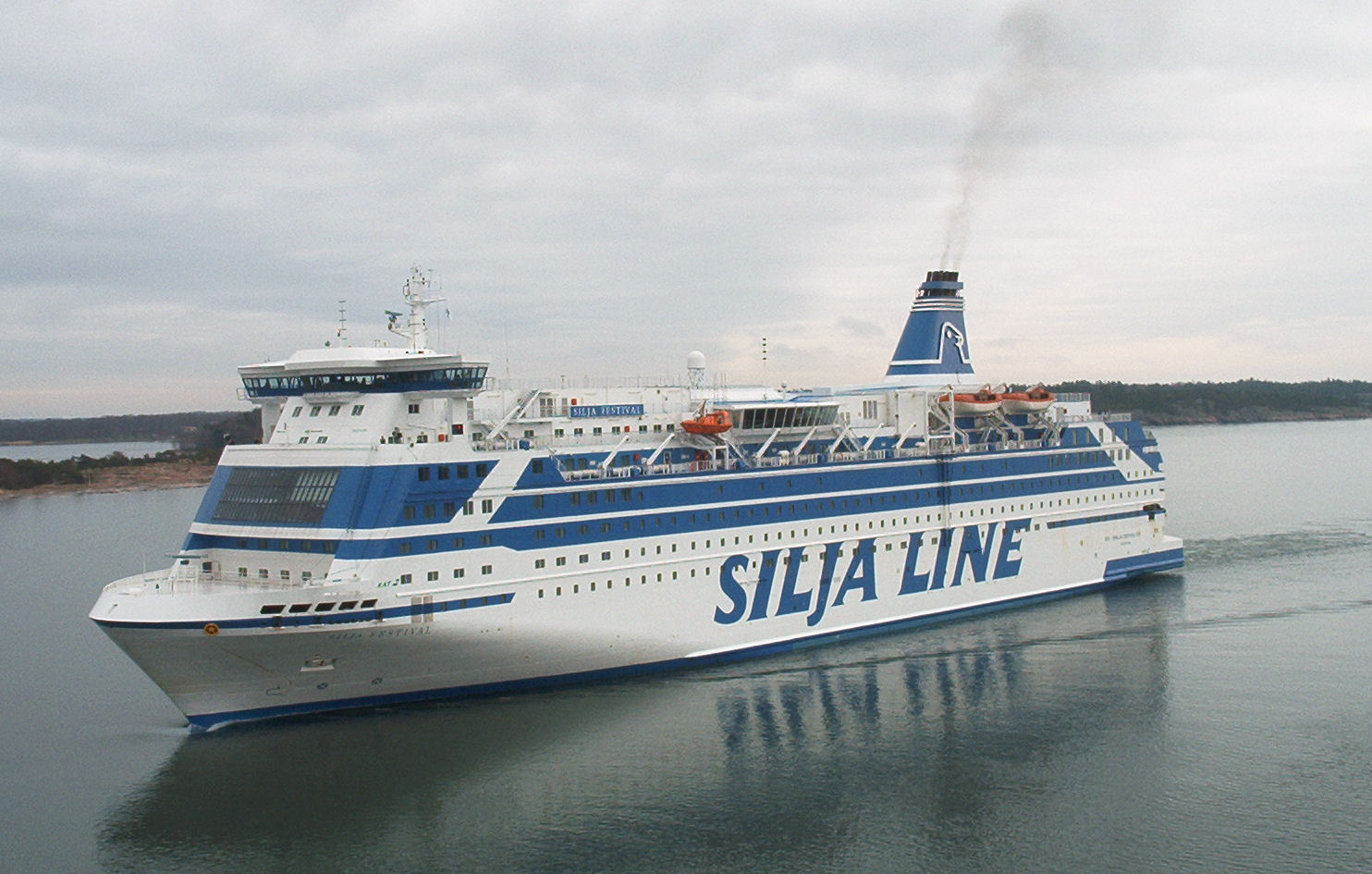
Silja Festival arriving in Mariehamn, May 2005

Initially Silja Festival continued on the same route as before, alongside her sister, but following the acquisition of Silja Europa and the subsequent fleet re-organisation there was no longer a need for the ship on the Turku route. As a result, was placed on the Vaasa–Umeå route from 20 March to 23 May 1993. When Silja Line began collaboration with Euroway in June 1993, Silja Festival was moved to their Malmö–Travemünde–Lübeck route, sailing parallel to Frans Suell. From there on the service was marketed as Silja Line Euroway. A few months later the route was extended to Copenhagen.

After the Euroway service was terminated in April 1994, Silja Festival was moved back to the Kvarken to operate from Vaasa to Umeå and Sundsvall. Around this time Silja Line made an agreement to sell Silja Festival or her sistership Silja Karneval to Norwegian ferry operator Color Line. Although Silja Karneval was the ship finally sold to Color, the new owners had presumed they would be getting Silja Festival and had made promotional posters for their new ship accordingly. As a result, the Silja Karneval was confusingly renamed Color Festival.

On 2 September 1994, Silja Festival was moved from Vaasa to serve the Helsinki–Tallinn route. For the summer of 1995, (26 June to 14 August) she served Vaasa–Sundsvall again, then returned to Helsinki–Tallinn. After the charter agreement of Silja Scandinavia ended in April 1997 On 5 April 1997, Silja Line switched the ship's flag from Finnish to Swedish and put her back on Stockholm–Mariehamn–Turku service, where she remained until 2008.

Silja Festival was replaced on the Turku–Stockholm service by MS Galaxy on 23 July 2008. Subsequently, Silja Festival was moved to the Latvian ship registry, repainted with Tallink logos, and entered service on Tallink's Stockholm–Riga route on 2 August 2008. Despite being moved under the Tallink brand and marketed as "Festival", the ship's registered name remained as Silja Festival.

On 5 April 2013, Tallink announced the purchase of Viking Line's ferry Isabelle which then replaced Silja Festival on the Stockholm-Riga route on 6 May 2013. Isabelle, which became the new name in the Tallink fleet, has more passenger and car capacity which is needed to meet the increased demand on the route.

Silja Festival sailed to British Columbia, Canada in March 2014 to be used for accommodations for construction workers helping to construct Rio Tinto Alcan's new Aluminum Smelter. While in Kitimat, British Columbia the vessel was assigned the name "Delta Spirit Lodge". Silja Festival remained moored at Rio Tinto's dock for just over a year prior to departing for Italy at the end of April 2015. Now she is called by her new name "Mega Andrea". And now she has enough work at Corsica Ferries in Italy. Her home port now is Genova.

== Decks ==
1. Engine room, cinema
2. Engine room, Tourist II-class cabins, sauna, swimming pool and hot tubs
3. Car deck
  1. Car platform, can be lowered hydraulically to divide the car deck in two giving space for two layers of passenger cars
4. Seaside, Tourist I and Tourist I S-class cabins, Lobby shop, Siljaland children's playroom, information desk, boarding, crew accommodations
5. Silja, Seaside, Tourist I and Tourist I S-class cabins, crew accommodations
6. Suites, Silja, Seaside, Tourist I and Tourist I S-class cabins, crew accommodations
7. Dancing Palace night club (level 1), Captain's Grill restaurant, Trattoria restaurant, Café Martim, Sailor's Pub, Buffet Veranda
8. Dancing Palace night club (level 2), casino, conference rooms, tax-free shop, perfumerie
9. Panorama bar, crew accommodations, sundeck
10. Crew accommodations
11. Bridge
