= MS Gabriella =

1992 Finnish cruiseferry

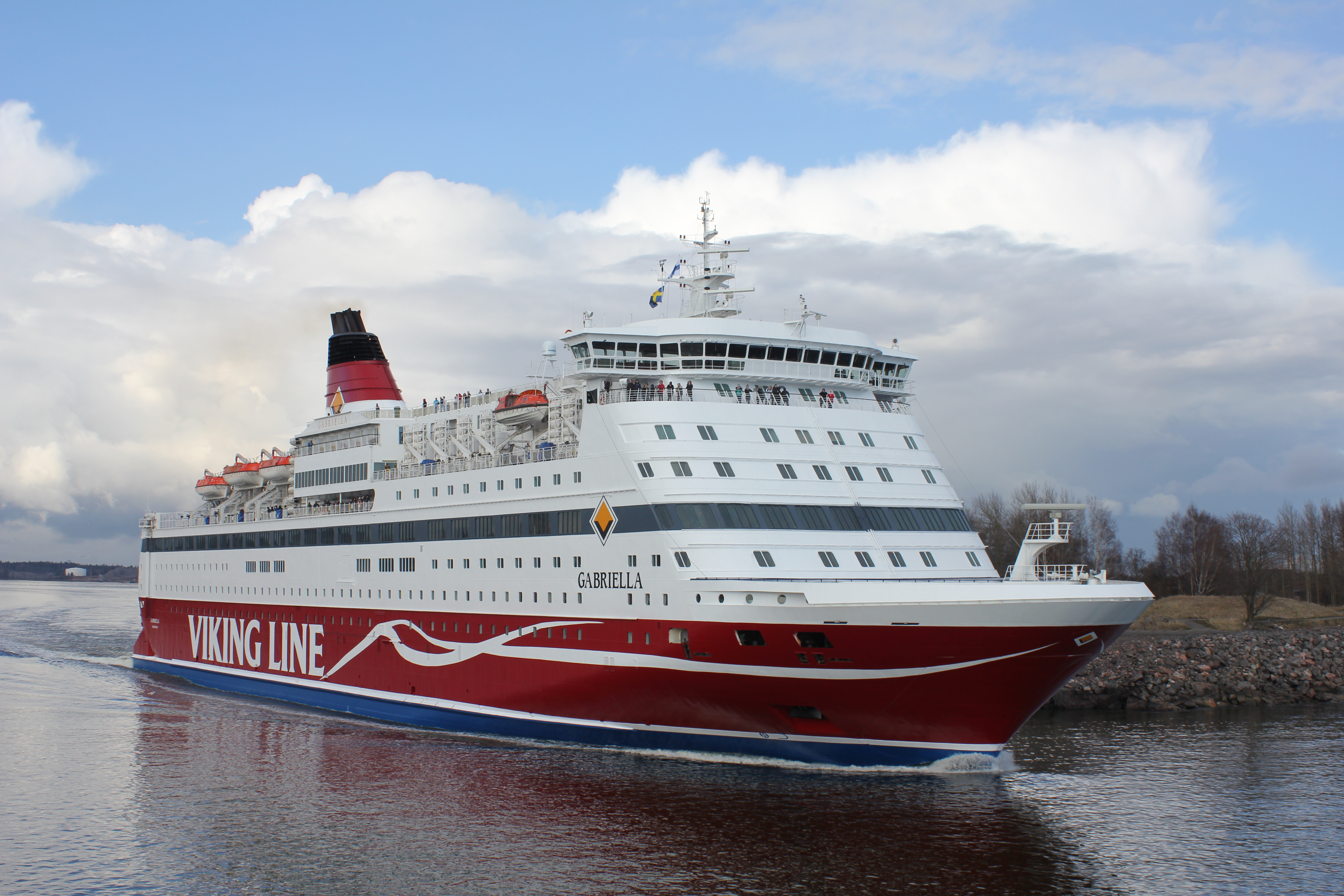

History

Finland
- Name: 1992–1994: Frans Suell; 1994–1997: Silja Scandinavia; 1997 onwards: Gabriella
- Owner: 1992–1997: Sea-Link Shipping; 1997 onwards: Viking Line
- Operator: 1992–1994: Euroway; 1994–1997: Silja Line; 1997 onwards: Viking Line
- Port of registry: 1992–1997: Malmö, Sweden; 1997 onwards: Mariehamn, Finland
- Route: Helsinki–Mariehamn–Stockholm (as of 2008)
- Ordered: 28 September 1989
- Builder: Brodosplit, Split, Croatia
- Yard number: 372
- Launched: 23 January 1991
- Christened: 16 May 1992 by Birgit Nilsson
- Acquired: 4 May 1992
- Maiden voyage: 17 May 1992
- In service: 19 May 1992
- Identification: Call sign: OJHP; IMO number: 8917601; MMSI number: 230361000
- Status: In service

General characteristics (as built)
- Type: Cruiseferry
- Tonnage: 35,285 GT; 2,962 DWT
- Length: 169.40 m (555 ft 9 in)
- Beam: 27.60 m (90 ft 7 in)
- Draught: 6.25 m (20 ft 6 in)
- Decks: 12
- Ice class: 1 A Super
- Installed power: 4 × Pielstick 12 PC2 6V-400E diesel; combined 23,780 kW (31,890 hp)
- Propulsion: 2 propellers, 2 bow thrusters, 1 stern thruster
- Speed: 21.5 knots (39.8 km/h; 24.7 mph)
- Capacity: 2,400 passengers; 2,170 passenger berths; 400 cars; 970 lanemeters

General characteristics (as Gabriella)
- Tonnage: 35,492 GT
- Length: 171.20 m (561 ft 8 in)
- Beam: 27.60 m (90 ft 7 in)
- Draught: 6.40 m (21 ft)
- Decks: 12 (11 passenger accessible)
- Ice class: 1 A Super
- Speed: 20.5 knots (38.0 km/h; 23.6 mph)
- Capacity: 2,420 passengers; 2,402 passenger berths; 400 cars; 970 lanemeters

MS Gabriella is a cruiseferry sailing on a route connecting Helsinki, Finland and Stockholm, Sweden for Viking Line. She was built in 1992 in Brodosplit, Croatia as Frans Suell for service with Euroway. Between 1994 and 1997 she sailed as Silja Scandinavia for Silja Line. Gabriella has sister ships Mega Victoria operated by Corsica Ferries, Isabelle operated by Tallink, and a third one, Crown Seaways, operated by DFDS Seaways.

== Concept and construction ==
Euroway was a concept developed during the latter half of the 1980s by the Sweden-based Sea-Link Shipping. The new brand was planned to operate two state-of-the-art cruiseferries between Malmö in Sweden and Lübeck in Germany via Travemünde in Germany, with the service aimed in particular at conference groups. Sea-link decided to order the ships from Brodosplit in Croatia, which at that time still was part of the Socialist Federal Republic of Yugoslavia. The ships were based on the same design as the Amorella and Isabella that had been built by the same shipyard for the Finland-based SF Line for Viking Line traffic in 1988 and 1989, respectively. The Euroway sisters were designed with a somewhat different layout of public spaces and cabins, as well as an additional cabin deck.

The order for the first ship, Frans Suell, was placed on 28 September 1989, with the delivery date projected in mid-1991. The ship was launched on 23 January 1991, but due to the Croatian War of Independence her construction was severely delayed, and she was not ready for her first sea trials until January 1992. Following her second sea trials in March 1992 Frans Suell sailed to Rijeka for finalization of her construction and to receive the Euroway livery. The ship was finally delivered to her owners on 4 May 1992 and left Split for Malmö.

== Service history ==
=== 1992–1994: Frans Suell ===
On 16 May 1992 Frans Suell was christened in Malmö by the Swedish opera singer Birgit Nilsson. The following day she set on her maiden voyage from Malmö to Travemünde and Lübeck, with only invited guests on board. On 19 May 1992 she began normal service on the Malmö–Travemünde route, with a daily departure from both ports. The service had a troubled start, as marketing had been difficult due to delays in the construction of the ship. Due to restrictions placed by the city of Malmö on traffic through the city, no trucks could be carried on board, and operating the buffet restaurant on board caused difficulties for the company.

From 1 September 1992 onwards Frans Suell's route was extended to Lübeck for the duration of the Northern Hemisphere winter season. The call at Travemünde was maintained as the city of Lübeck did not allow cars to be unloaded in the city. Due to the longer crossing times the timetable was altered with departures from every second day from Malmö and Lübeck, with overnight crossings.

On 1 June 1993 Sea-Link Shipping entered an agreement with Silja Line, with the latter assuming marketing and operational responsibility of the Euroway service and ships. The service now became marketed as Silja Line Euroway, with Silja Festival joining Frans Suell as the second ship on the service (the original planned second ship, Frans Kockum, had been even more severely delayed than Frans Suell, and eventually Sea-Link cancelled the order). From the beginning of June 1993 Frans Suell (and Silja Festival)'s route was again shortened to Malmö–Travemünde, with two daily departures from both ports.

With hopes of attracting more passengers, for the 1993–1994 winter season the route was extended into Copenhagen–Malmö–Travemünde–Lübeck from 1 September 1993 onwards, with daily departures from Copenhagen and Lübeck. Due to the low passenger figures on the service and the poor financial situation of Silja Line, the decision was made to terminate the Euroway service on 12 March 1994. Silja Line wished to charter Frans Suell for use on their Turku–Stockholm service, and already on 2 March 1994 she had been chartered to Silja.

=== 1994–1997: Silja Scandinavia ===
Following the closure of Euroway Frans Suell sailed to the Vuosaari shipyard in Helsinki, Finland, where she was fitted with rear sponsons, refurbished, painted in Silja Line livery and renamed Silja Scandinavia. On 31 March 1994 she entered service on the Turku–Stockholm route. Silja Line's main rivals Viking Line, who owned two of the ship's sisters, were also interested in chartering the ship but thought the price was too high.

As Silja Line's charter agreement for Silja Scandinavia was drawing to a close in 1996, the main funders of Sea-Link demanded that instead of continuing the charter the ship should be sold to the highest bidder. Although Silja Line would have wanted to continue operating the ship, the company was in such a poor financial condition that it could not pay the price asked for the ship. Instead, she was sold to Viking Line on 11 November 1996, with the delivery date planned in April 1997. On 4 April 1997 Silja Scandinavia arrived for the last time in Turku in Silja Line colours.

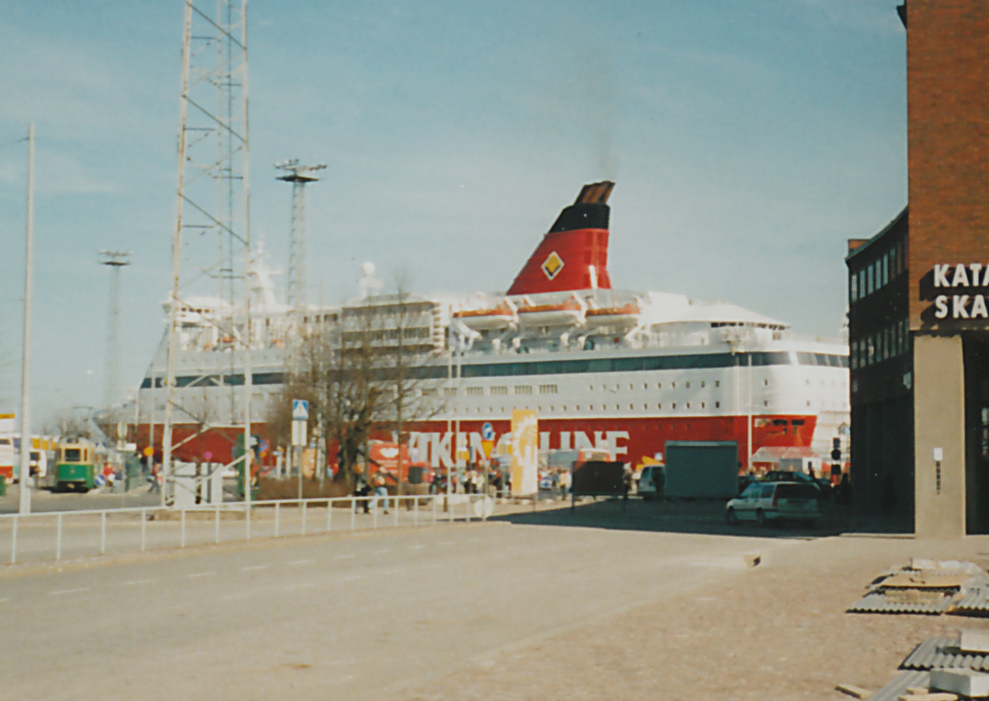
Gabriella in Helsinki, May 1997. Note the all-red funnel and white-painted car ramps

=== 1997 onwards: Gabriella ===
After ending her service with Silja Line, Silja Scandinavia again sailed to the Vuosaari shipyard in Helsinki, where she was delivered to Viking Line, refurbished, repainted and renamed Gabriella (the name having been chosen by a public naming competition). On 17 April 1997, Gabriella entered service for her new owners on the Helsinki–Stockholm route. On 30 June 1999 the a call at Mariehamn was added to the service to maintain tax free sales on board. In 1999, 2002, 2003, 2004 and 2005 the ship spent brief periods sailing on Turku–Mariehamn–Stockholm route, in place of the ship normally used in the service. On 23 January 2004 she collided with the harbour ferry Ehrensvärd in the Helsinki harbour, resulting in minor damage to both ships.

Between 5 May 2008 and 27 May 2008, Gabriella was rebuilt at Öresundsvarvet in Landskrona, Sweden, as a part of Viking Line's fleet rebuilding programme. The refit included the removal of the original cafeteria from deck 7 in favour of expanding the tax-free shop, the addition of a games room on deck 7, the addition of a Tapas & Wine restaurant on deck 8, the conversion of the former BBQ-restaurant into an Ella's restaurant, the conversion of the two-storey discothèque on decks 9 and 10 into a new cafeteria, the addition of new cabins in place of the former conference rooms on deck 11, and redecoration of the majority of passenger cabins.

== Decks ==
Deck layout of MS Gabriella.

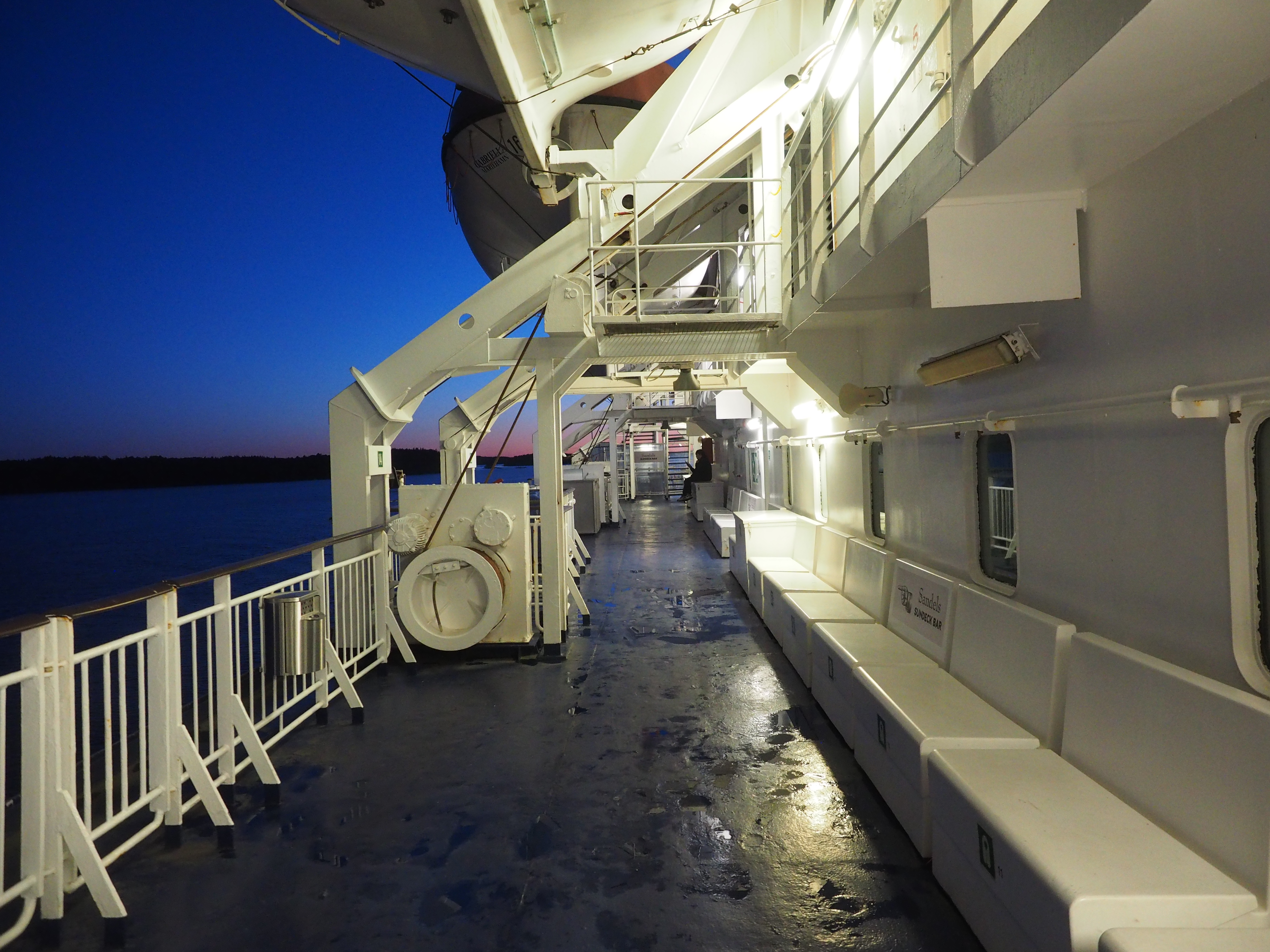
The outer deck of MS Gabriella on a September evening on the ship's voyage from Stockholm to Helsinki.

Deck 12
Bridge and sun deck.
Deck 11
Captain's deck - Cabins of classes SUM, LUX and B2X.
Deck 10
Conference deck - Conference rooms ("Adventure Island" play room in summertime, "Kid's playroom" play room outside summertime), Upstairs Pub (upper floor), crew cabins.
Deck 9
Compass deck - Cabins of classes Suite, LXA, LYX, B4F, B2T and B2P, youths' room, Upstairs Pub (lower floor), sun deck.
Deck 8
Restaurant deck - Restaurants The Buffet, Bistrotek, Wine Bar, Grill, No Name and À la Carte & Sea, smoking room, casino, Club Mar nightclub, Living Room.
Deck 7
Info & Shopping deck - Cabins of classes Suite, B4, B2P, B2T, B4F, LYX and LXA, tax-free shopping, information, play room, Pop Up Shop, café Coffee & Joy, deposit boxes, embarkation and disembarkation.
Deck 6
Sextant deck - Cabins of classes A4, B4L, B2L, B4 and B2P, video game room for youths, sauna and swimming pool.
Deck 5
Bell deck - Cabins of classes A4, A4R, HA3/HB3, B2P and B4, embarkation and disembarkation.
Deck 4
Car platform deck - Car deck for personal cars (can be lifted up).
Deck 3
Car deck - Car deck.
Deck 2
Anchor deck - Cabins of class C4, upper engine room, machinery surveillance.
Deck 1
Primary and secondary engine room, boiler room and other technical facilities.

== Services ==
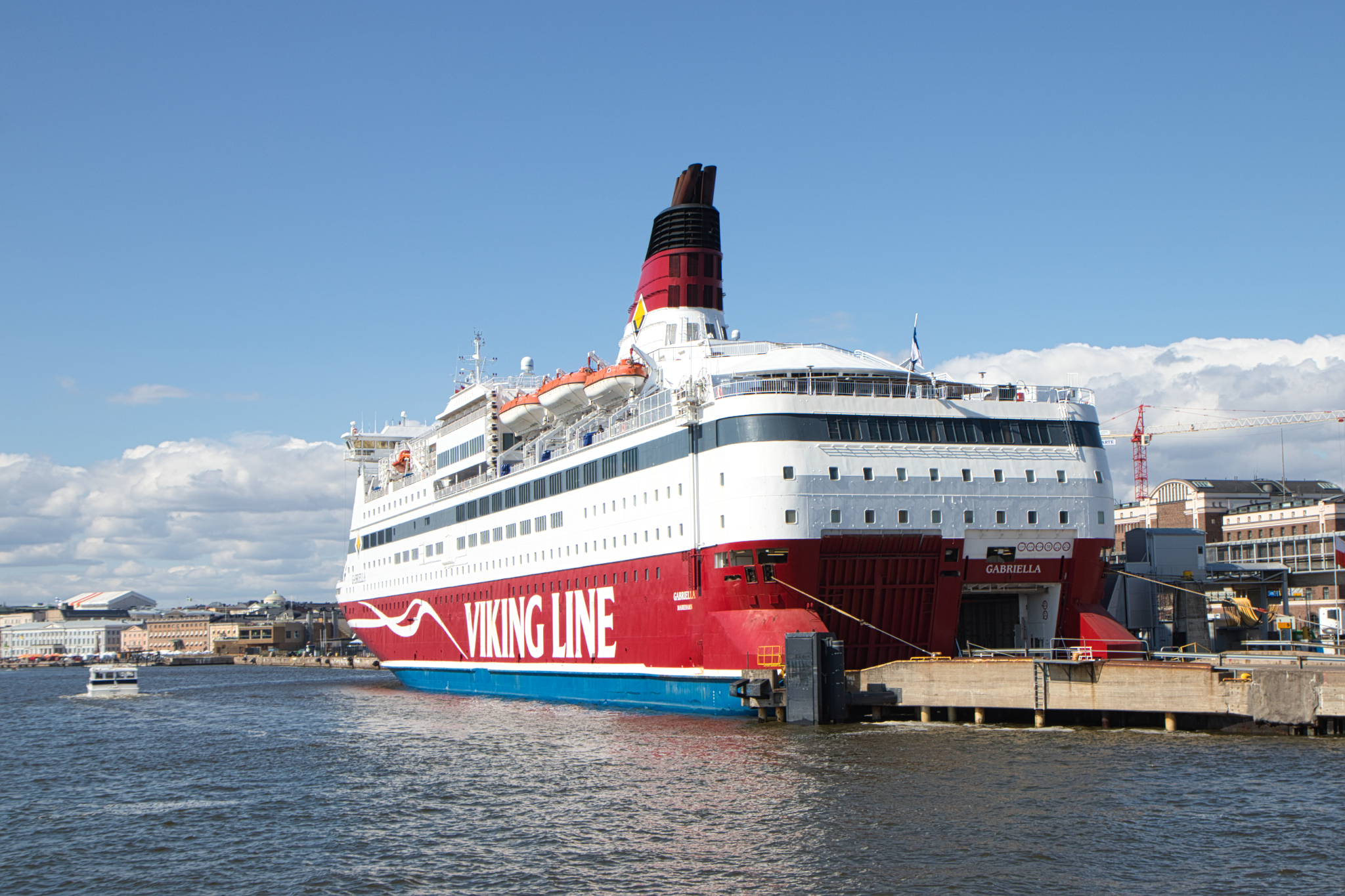
MS Gabriella in Katajanokka in 2022.

=== Restaurants and cafés ===
- The Buffet, self-service restaurant, deck 8.
- À la Carte & Seafood Bar, traditional à la carte restaurant and bar, deck 8.
- Grill, hamburger and steak restaurant, deck 8.
- Bistrotek, "street food" restaurant with varying themes, deck 8.
- No Name, restaurant offering dishes from all around the world, deck 8.
- Coffee & Joy, café, deck 7.

=== Bars ===
- Club Mar, largest nightclub on the ship, featuring various artists and Ville Viking, deck 8.
- Upstairs Pub, pub, decks 9 and 10.
- Wine Bar, wine and aperitif bar, piano music, deck 8.

=== Shops ===
- Taxfree Shop, large tax-free shop, deck 7.
- Pop Up Shop, small shop with varying themes, deck 7.
- Wine Shop, small speciality shop for wines next to the Wine Bar, deck 8.

=== Other services ===
- Information, open around the clock, deck 7.
- Conference rooms, deck 10.
- Children's playfroom, deck 7.

== Cabins ==
Starting from Viking Grace, Viking Line has changed the names of cabin classes from traditional letter and number combinations into more descriptive names. The names have gradually been changed on other Viking Line ships as well. All cabins have private toilets and showers.

Suite
Cabin for four persons, with double bed and convertible sofa. Breakfast is included. Surface area 28.5 m^{2} (deck 7) or 33.5 m^{2} (deck 9).
Junior Suite, balcony (SUM)
Cabin for two persons with balcony. Double bed and convertible sofa. Surface area 27 m^{2}.
Seaside Premium, balcony (LUX)
Cabin for two persons with balcony. Double bed and convertible sofa. Surface area 22–25 m^{2}.
Seaside Premium Large (LXA)
Cabin for two persons without balcony. Double bed and convertible sofa. Surface area 20 m^{2}.
Seaside Premium (LYX)
Cabin for two persons without balcony. Double bed. Surface area 11.5 m^{2}.
Inside Premium (B2X)
Spacious cabin for two persons without window. Double bed. Surface area 14.8-16.5 m^{2}.
Inside Comfort Plus (B2T)
Spacious cabin for two persons without window. Double bed. Surface area 11 m^{2}.
Inside Comfort Family (B4F)
Spacious cabin for four persons without window. Double bed, bunk bed with one upper bed and one lower bed. Surface area 13 m^{2}.
Inside Large (B4L)
Spacious cabin for four persons without window. Double bed, bunk bed with one upper bed and one lower bed. Surface area 13 m^{2}.
Inside Large (B2L)
Spacious cabin for two persons without window. Double bed. Surface area 11 m^{2}.
Seaside Standard (A4)
Cabin for four persons with window. Two bunk beds with one upper bed and one lower bed each. Surface area 8.5 m^{2}.
Seaside Standard Allergy (A4R)
Cabin for four persons with window, without fitted carpet. Two bunk beds with one upper bed and one lower bed each. Surface area 8.5 m^{2}.
Inside Standard (B4)
Cabin for four persons without window. Two bunk beds with one upper bed and one lower bed each. Surface area 8.5 m^{2}.
Inside Standard Allergy (B4R)
Cabin for four persons without window, without fitted carpet. Two bunk beds with one upper bed and one lower bed each. Surface area 8.5 m^{2}.
Seaside/Inside Handicap (HA3/HB3)
Cabin for three persons, with or without window. Designed for handicapped people. Two lower beds and one upper bed. Surface area 14.5 m^{2}.
Inside Piccolo (B2P)
Small cabin for two people without window. Bunk bed with one upper bed and one lower bed. Surface area 7 m^{2}.
Economy (C4)
Small economy cabin for four persons without window. Two bunk beds with one upper bed and one lower bed each. Surface area 8.5 m^{2}.

== Gallery ==
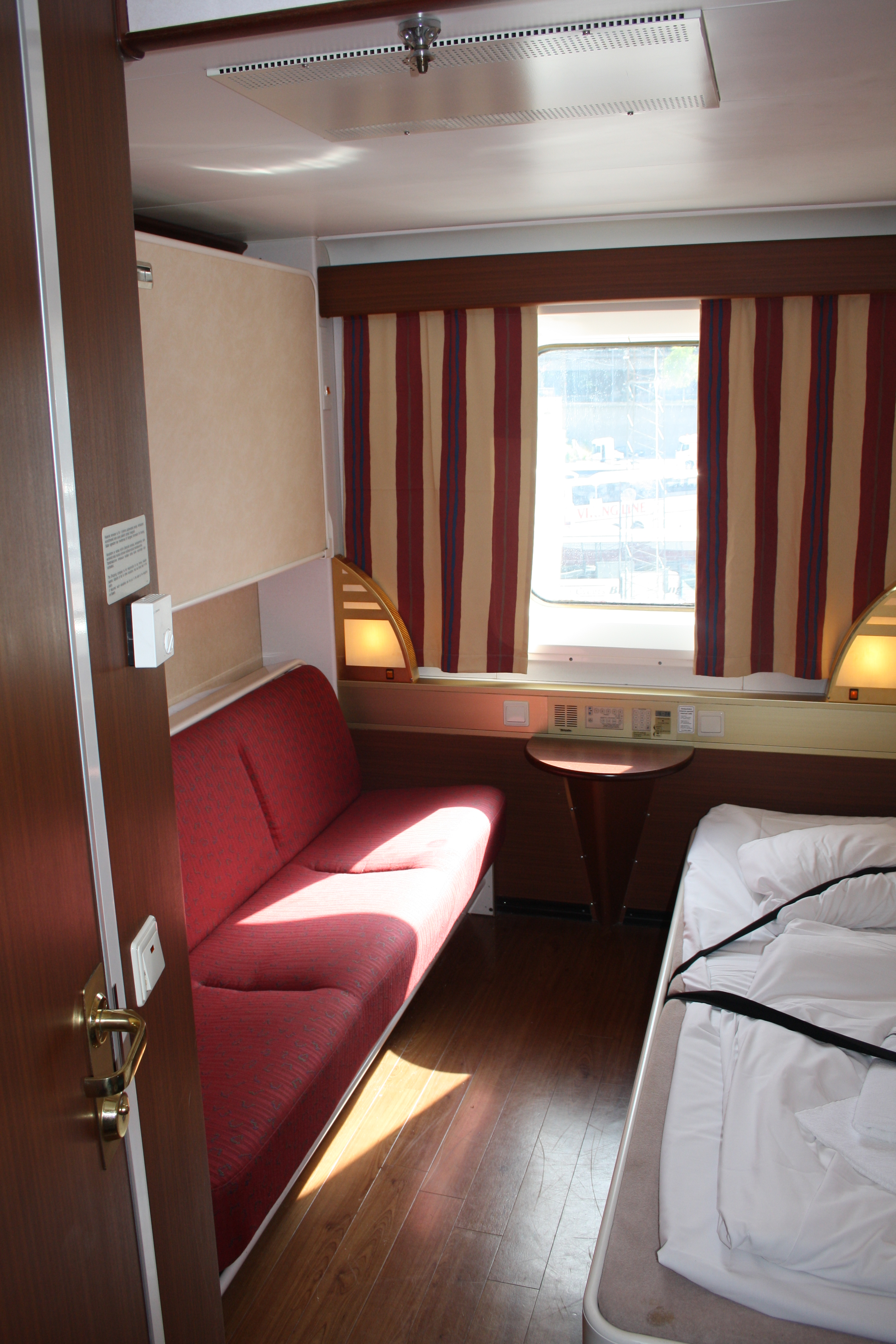
A4 Standard cabin.

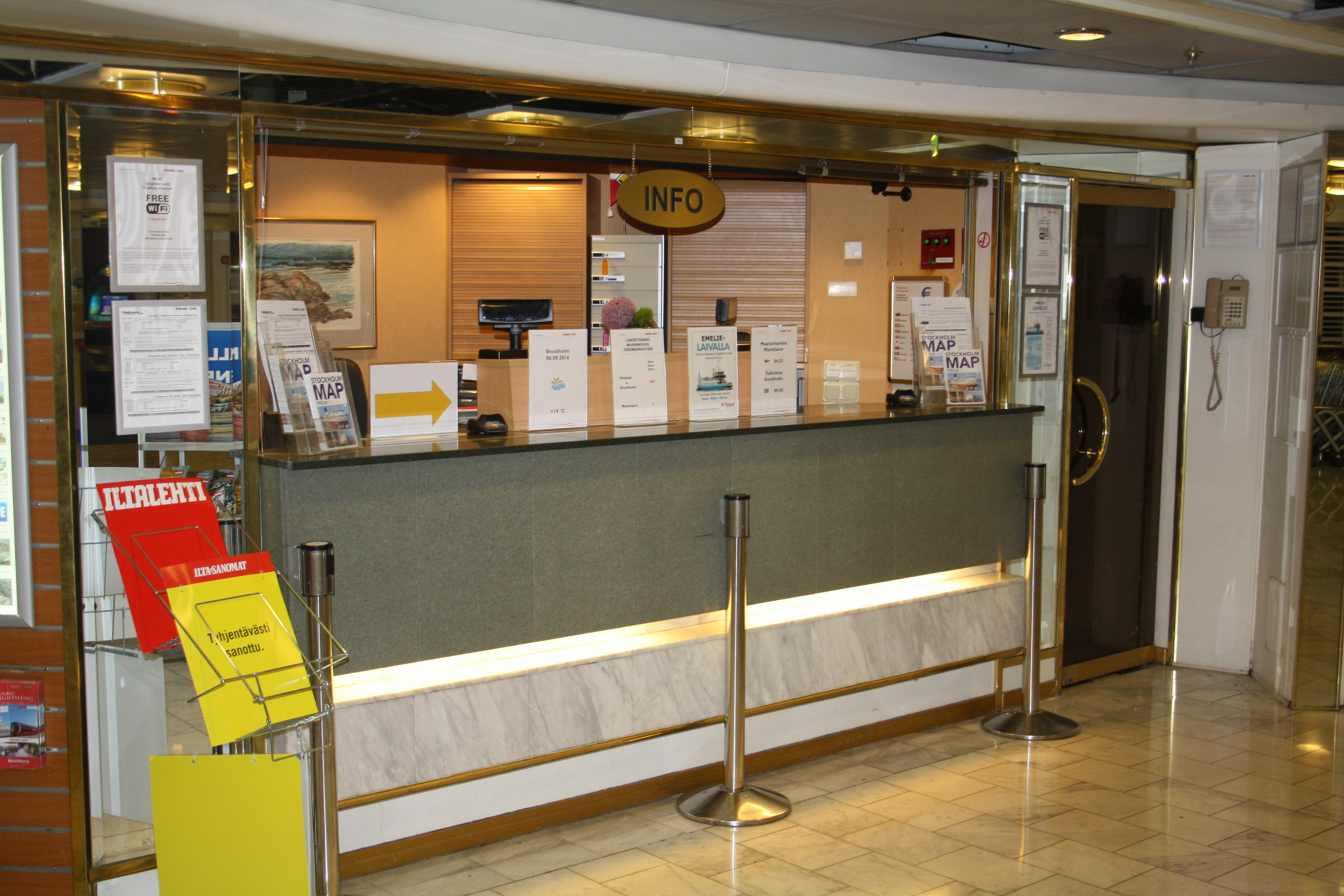
Information.

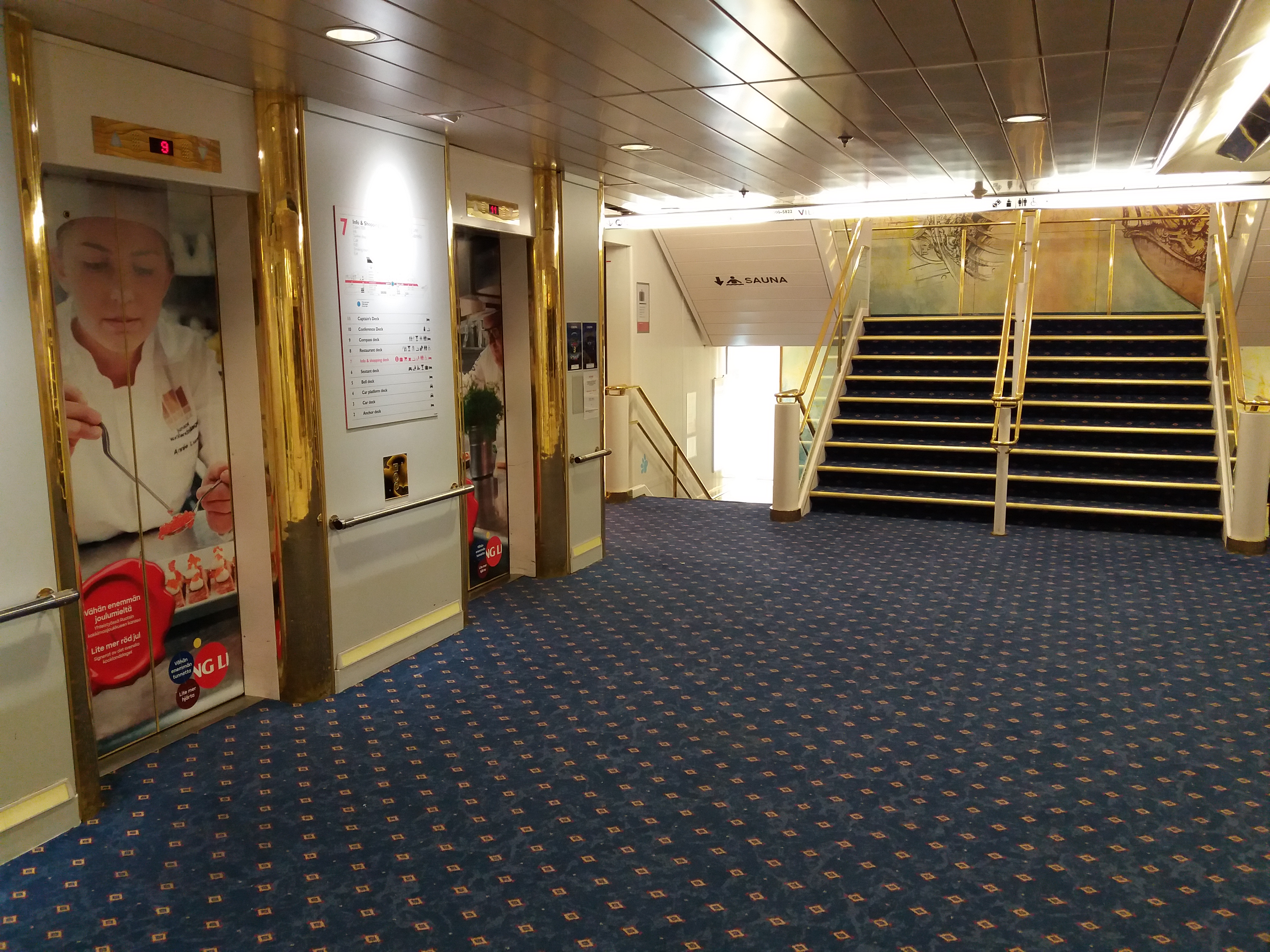
Lobby on deck 7.

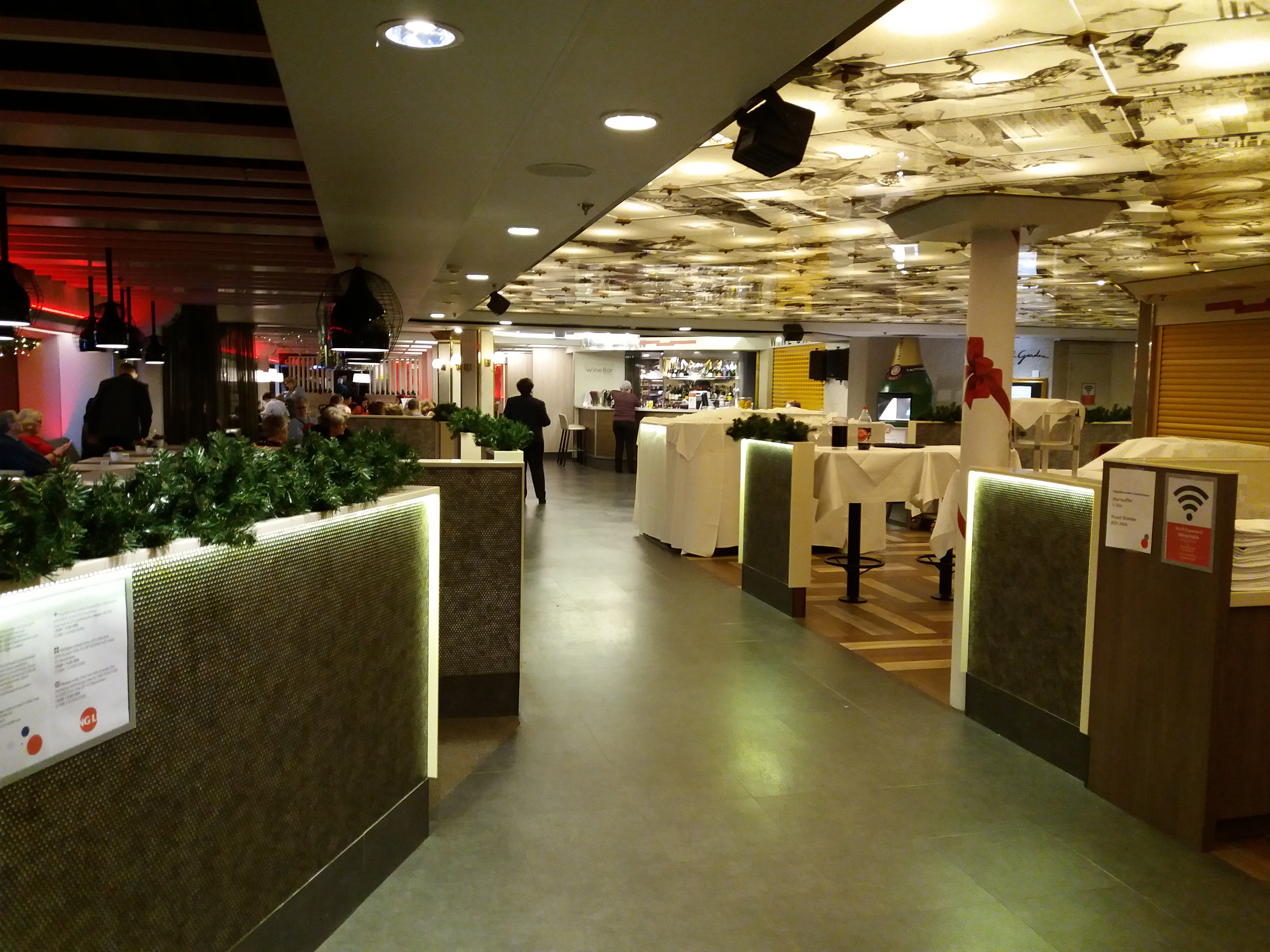
Restaurant arcade.

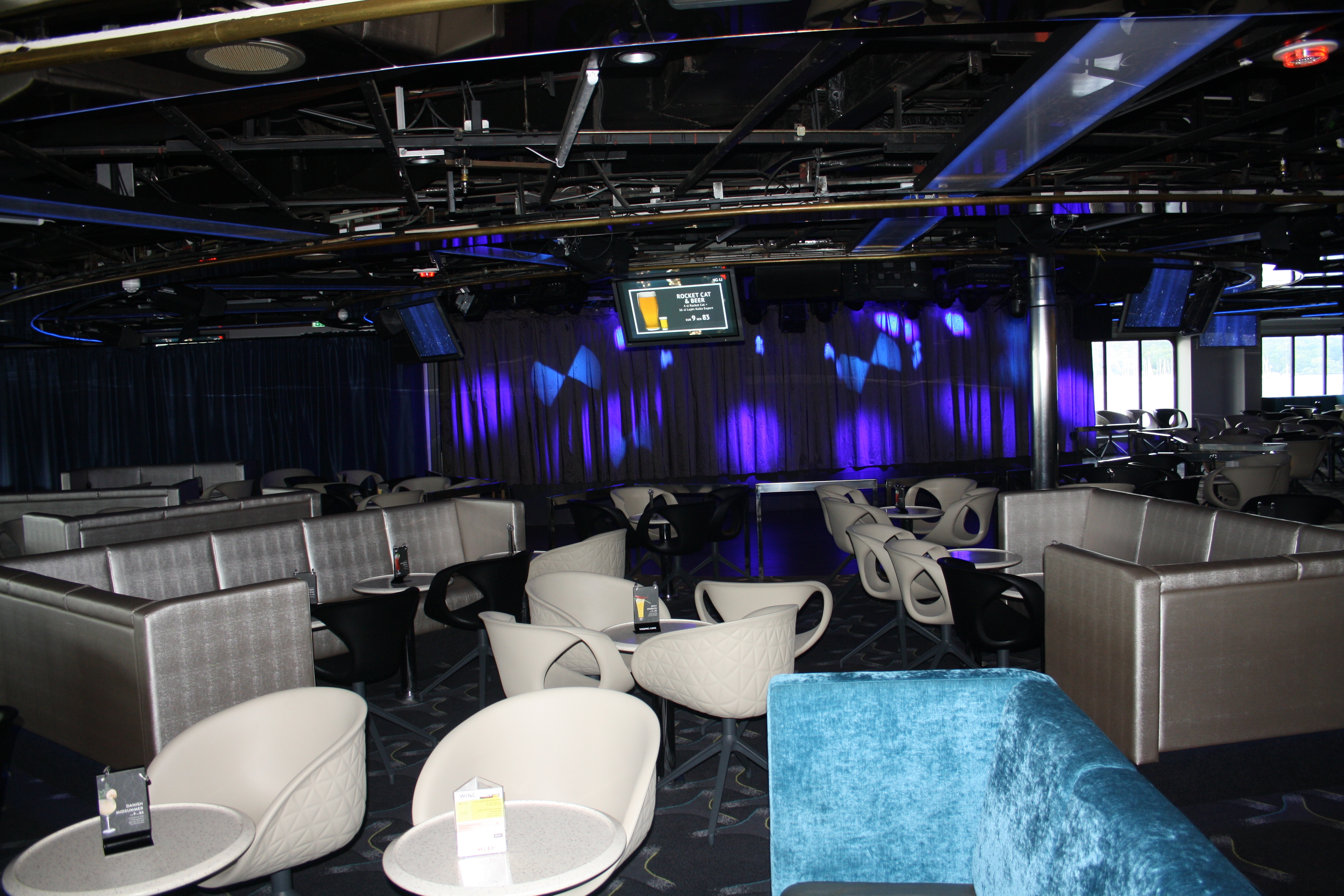
Club Mar nightclub.

== Accidents ==
- On 23 January 2004 Gabriella collided with the Suomenlinna island ferry Ehrensvärd. Gabriella got a small hole under the waterline.
- On 12 January 2022 Gabriella underwent a blackout and collided into a pier in Helsinki in front of the Allas Sea Pool. The ship got large scratches and notches into its hull and the bow was slightly damaged above the waterline and at the bulbous bow. The Allas Sea Pool sauna building was split into two in the middle and part of the structure moved tens of centimetres towards the Market Square. The ship was moved to the Turku repairs shipyard in Naantali for repairs. Viking Cinderella replaced the ship for the duration of repairs. Gabriella returned to traffic in late February.
