= Brodosplit =

Croatian shipyard

Coordinates: 43°31′25″N 16°26′30″E

Brodosplit d.d.
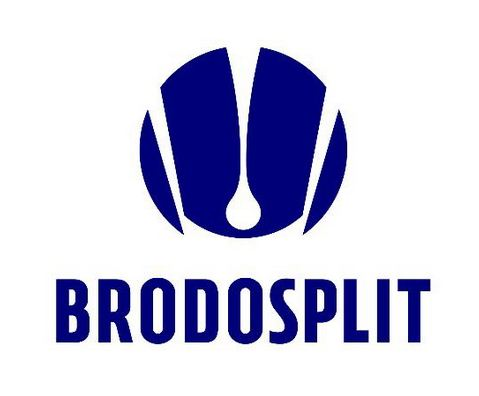
- Company type: Private
- Industry: Shipbuilding and Engineering
- Founded: 1922; 104 years ago
- Headquarters: Split, Croatia
- Area served: Worldwide
- Products: Ships, engines, diesel engines B&W MAN licensed
- Owner: hr:DIV Group (100%)
- Number of employees: 2,300
- Parent: DIV Group
- Website: www.brodosplit.hr

Brodosplit is the largest shipyard in Croatia, located in the Supaval bay, on the north side of the Split peninsula.

== History ==
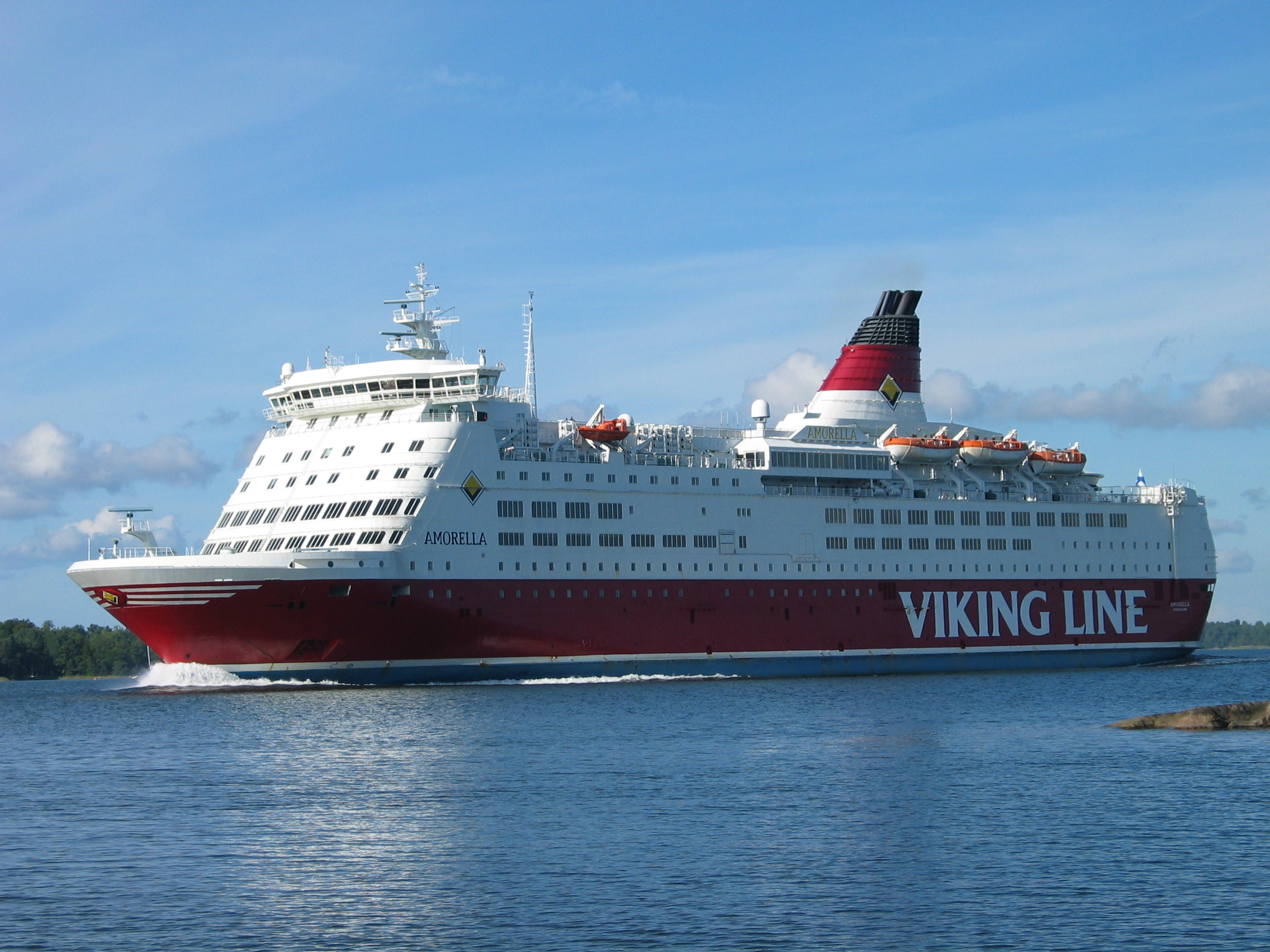
MS Amorella cruiseferry

The company was founded in 1922 by a merger of shipyards in the area and has been in its current location since 1932. With significant development in the latter half of the 20th century, it has grown into one of Croatia's largest shipyards. When Croatia was a part of Socialist Yugoslavia, the Yugoslav Navy's submarines designed by Zagreb's Brodarski Institute were built in this shipyard, which was called Brodogradilište specijalnih objekata (Special objects' shipyard.)

After the breakup of Yugoslavia, Brodosplit became a joint stock company, with the Government of Croatia as the majority holder. It employed nearly 4,000 people and had experience in designing and building a wide range of ships for an international market, diesel engines licensed by B&W (MAN) engine.

In 2013, it was privatised and acquired by the Croatian manufacturing company DIV, pending a major restructuring and optimization. The number of workers was cut down to about 2,300.

== Ships built ==
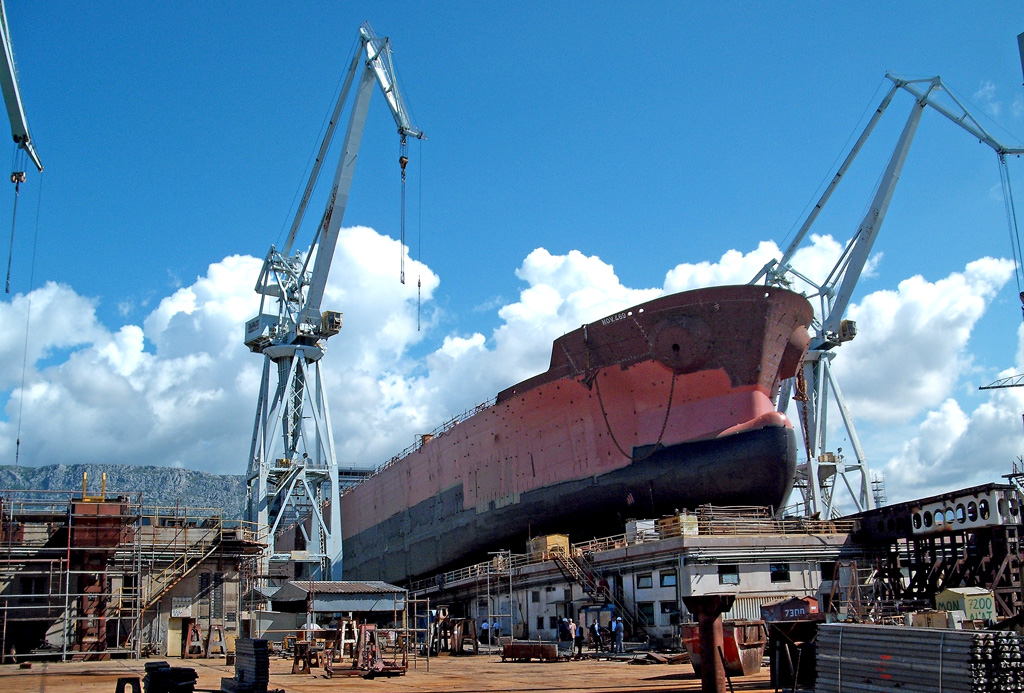
Juice carrier MV Orange Star, sitting on a slipway

Brodosplit can build and launch ships of 280 metre length and 166,000 DWT in one piece. To date, they have delivered about 350 vessels, with a total deadweight of over 9 million tons, including many tankers, both panamax and non-panamax, as well as container ships, bulk carriers, dredgers, and passenger ships. 80% of the ships built are exported to foreign contractors from numerous countries, like England, France, Finland, Norway, Sweden, Poland, Germany, Switzerland, Greece, Russia, India, Liberia, Nigeria, Pakistan, Mexico, Argentina, Brazil, Venezuela and the USA.

The BSO - Brodogradilište specijalnih objekata special division is responsible for the construction of numerous advanced vessels. These include warships - frigates, patrol boats, landing craft, submarines etc. for the Ex-Yugoslav Navy, as well as the current Croatian Navy. BSO also constructed offshore platforms, luxury yachts, small cruise ships, catamarans, medium-size ferries like MV Jadran for Jadrolinija, as well as some specialised ships like the Bios Dva research vessel, launched in 2009.

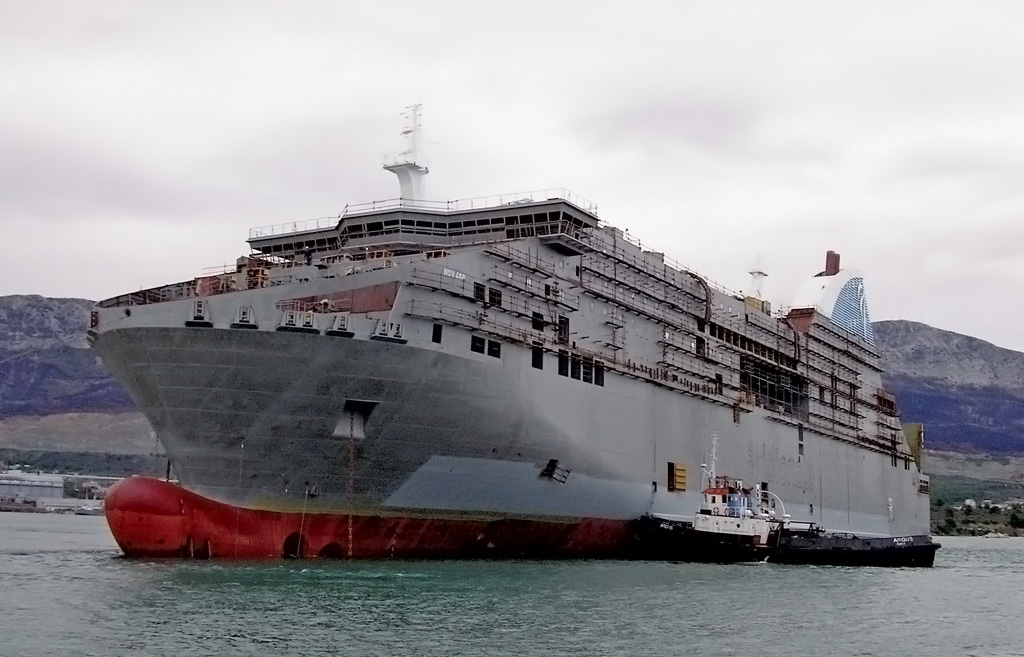
N468 ro-pax MS Piana - a few moments after her launching

From 1988 to 1994 Brodosplit built four large 34,384 GT ferries for different contractors, with SF-Line being the biggest one. They were named MS Amorella, MS Isabella, MS Frans Suell and MS Thomas Mann. These vessels collected numerous "ship of the year" awards.

A recent innovation is two tankers for Greek clients, a combination between tanker and ro-ro ship. They can transport the oil products from the mainland to Greek islands, and transport the trucks to continue distribution across the islands.

Yard number 469 is a 189-metre-long juice tanker, specialized for transportation of 32,000,000 litres of fresh orange juice in fourteen specially made, sterilized, and refrigerated tanks. These types of highly sophisticated tankers are made only in Croatia and Norway.

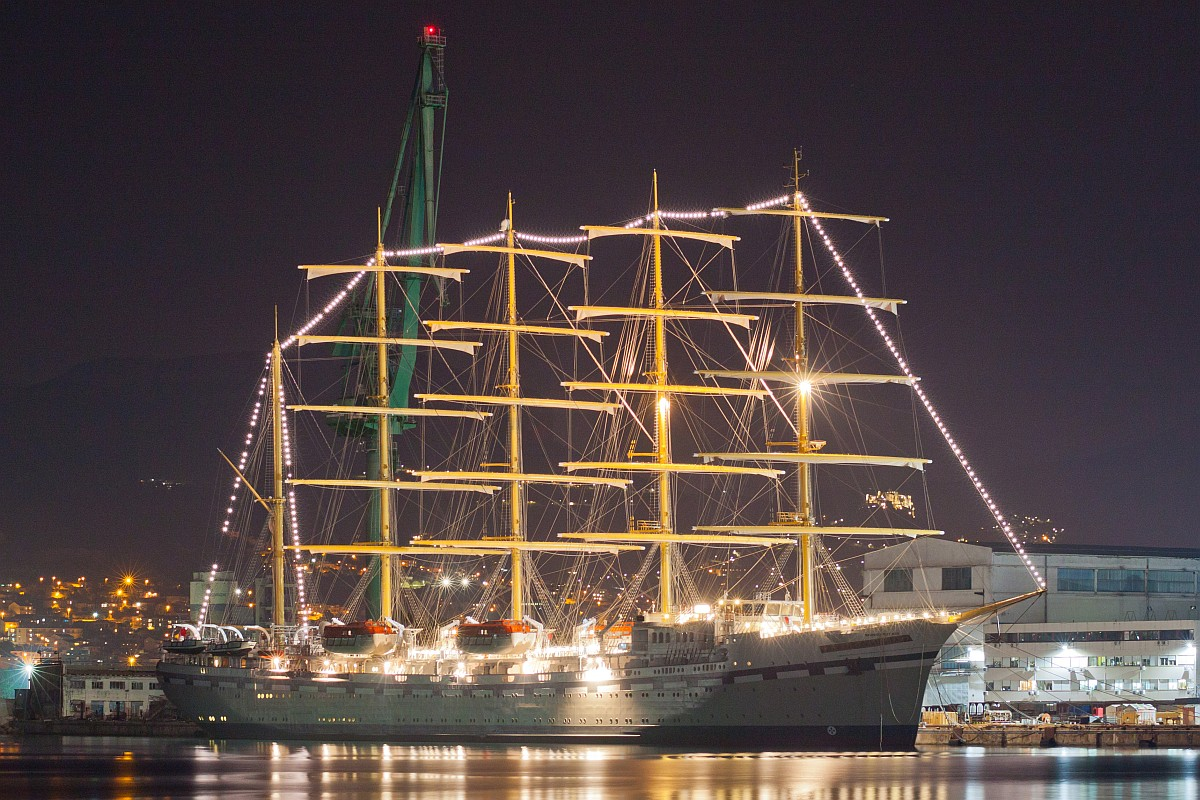
Flying Clipper in her finishing stages

Yard number 468, due for delivery to a French client SNCM in 2011, is a 41,300GT, 180-metre-long Ro-Pax vessel with twelve decks, for 750 passengers, with 2,500 lane metres for vehicles and a helipad on the top deck. With a selling price of over $150 million, it is the most expensive ship ever built in Croatia.

In 2013 Brodosplit has built two large heavy lift ships for Jumbo Shipping, the largest of their kind. Laying 152 meters long, and 27 meters wide, these have a deadweight of 14,000 tonnes. On their deck they sport two large Huisman cranes, each with a lifting capacity of 1,500 tonnes, bringing the total lifting capacity of the vessel to a record-breaking 3,000 tonnes.

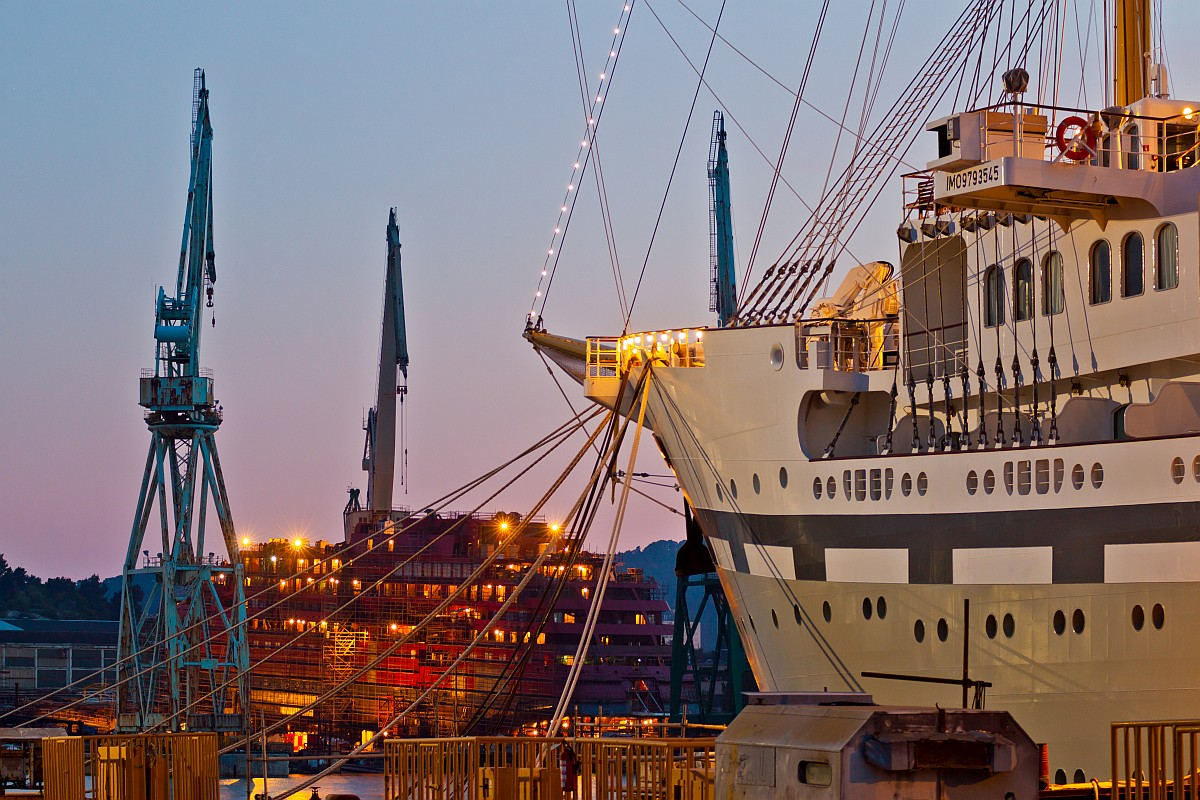
Ultramarine being built on the slipway, with Flying Clipper in the foreground

In 2018 Brodosplit has built Flying Clipper, a steel-hulled five-masted fully rigged tall ship which is intended to be used as a cruise ship. A luxury vessel was designed by Polish naval architect Zygmunt Choreń, and initially acquired by Star Clippers Ltd. of Sweden. She is the largest sailing ship ever launched. Her design was based on France II, a famous French five-mast cargo windjammer built in 1911.

Ships built by Brodosplit
Yard no	Name	Type	Year	DWT
487	Ultramarine	Polar Cruiser	2020	1,445
486	Olivia O.	Passenger Ship	2017	980
485	Janssonius	Polar Cruiser	2021	1,276
484	Hondius	Polar Cruiser	2018	1,276
483	Flying Clipper	Tall ship	2017	2,000
482	Plovput Split	Working Ship	2015	305
475	Picasso	Coastal Cruiser	2014	450
474	Fairmaster	Heavy lifter	2013	14,000
473	Jumbo Kinetic	Heavy lifter	2013	14,000
470	Solin	Handy Bulk Carrier	2012	51,900
465	Stena Premium	Handymax Oil Tanker	2011	65,056
468	Piana	Car Passenger Ferry	2011	41,300
469	Orange Star	Orange Juice Tanker	2011	35,750
464	Stena Penguin	Handymax Oil Tanker	2010	64,843
467	Sveti Dujam	Handy Bulk Carrier	2010	52,113
466	Peristil	Handy Bulk Carrier	2010	52,113
463	Stena Polaris	Handymax Oil Tanker	2010	64,917
459	Arctic Char	Panamax Oil Tanker	2010	74,999
462	Stena Progres	Handymax Oil Tanker	2009	65,056
458	Arctic Flounder	Panamax Oil Tanker	2009	74,999
461	Olib	Aframax Oil Tanker	2009	108,433
457	Marinor	Panamax Oil Tanker	2008	74,999
460	Dugi Otok	Aframax Oil Tanker	2008	108,414
456	Marika	Panamax Oil Tanker	2008	74,999
451	Mariann	Panamax Oil Tanker	2008	74,999
450	Mari Ugland	Panamax Oil Tanker	2008	74,999
446	Stena Perros	Handymax Oil Tanker	2007	65,079
445	Stena President	Handymax Oil Tanker	2007	65,079
447	Donat	Suezmax Oil Tanker	2007	166,188
449	Maribel	Panamax Oil Tanker	2007	74,998
455	Palva	Panamax Oil Tanker	2007	74,940
454	Stena Poseidon	Panamax Oil Tanker	2006	74,927
448	Marilee	Panamax Oil Tanker	2006	74,898
453	Zefyros	Oil Tanker/Ro-Ro	2006	1,999
444	Stena Performance	Handymax Oil Tanker	2006	65,000
443	Stena Primorsk	Handymax Oil Tanker	2006	65,000
442	Stena Provence	Handymax Oil Tanker	2006	65,000
452	Apiliotis	Oil Tanker/Ro-Ro	2006	1,975
441	Stena Paris	Handymax Oil Tanker	2005	65,000
432	Elka Delos	Oil/Chemical Tanker	2005	44,598
434	Hrvatska	Suezmax Oil Tanker	2005	166,447
438	Elka Apolon	Aframax Oil Tanker	2005	101,970
437	Elka Athina	Aframax Oil Tanker	2005	101,970
440	Guvernor Farkhutdinov	Aframax Oil Tanker	2004	108,078
433	Alan Veliki	Suezmax Oil Tanker	2005	166,739
436	Elka Vassiliki	Aframax Oil Tanker	2005	95,000
439	Sakhalin Island	Aframax Oil Tanker	2003	108,078
435	Elka Aristotle	Aframax Oil Tanker	2003	94,143
423	Equinox Seas	Handy Bulk Carrier	2003	51,000
428	Elka Glory	Oil/Chemical Tanker	2003	44,598
431	Stinice	Oil/Chemical Tanker	2003	45,467
427	Elka Herkules	Oil/Chemical Tanker	2002	44,481
430	Baluni	Oil/Chemical Tanker	2002	45,467
422	Equinox Voyager	Handy Bulk Carrier	2002	50,568
429	Bene	Oil/Chemical Tanker	2002	45,467
421	Equinox Dawn	Handy Bulk Carrier	2002	50,583
417	Elka Eleftheria	Oil/Chemical Tanker	2001	45,000
416	Elka Angelioue	Oil/Chemical Tanker	2001	44,787
415	Elka Nikolas	Oil/Chemical Tanker	2001	44,787
409	Mosor	Handy Bulk Carrier	2001	42,600
407	Nounou	Handy Oil Tanker	2000	44,990
406	Marinoula	Handy Oil Tanker	2000	44,990
404	Lady Korčula	Reefer/Container Vessel	2000	12,913
403	Lady Račišće	Reefer/Container Vessel	2000	12,913
401	Podravina	Oil/Chemical Tanker	1999	44,577
400	Posavina	Oil/Chemical Tanker	1999	44,881
397	Lovely Lady	Oil/Chemical Tanker	1999	47,431
402	Split	Handy Bulk Carrier	1998	42,584
396	Bering Sea	Oil/Chemical Tanker	1998	47,431
395	Barents Sea	Oil/Chemical Tanker	1998	47,431
399	Don Frane Bulić	Handy Bulk Carrier	1997	42,584
388	Oluja	Handy Bulk Carrier	1996	42,584
390	Tikhvin	Oil/Chemical Tanker	1996	40,727
389	Tambov	Oil/Chemical Tanker	1996	40,727
387	Arctic Mariner	Handy Bulk Carrier	1996	41,712
386	Arctic Navigator	Handy Bulk Carrier	1996	41,712
377	Frankopan	Aframax Oil Tanker	1995	101,000
379	Arctic Voyager	Handy Bulk Carrier	1994	48,000
378	Arctic Traider	Handy Bulk Carrier	1994	48,000
376	Zrinski	Aframax Oil Tanker	1994	101,000
373	Thomas Mann	Car Passenger Ferry	1994	4,105
370	Comor	Suezmax Oil Tanker	1993	140,000
372	Frans Suell	Car Passenger Ferry	1992	4,105
369	Sunda	Suezmax Oil Tanker	1992	140,000
368	Marble	Suezmax Oil Tanker	1992	140,000
367	Granite	Suezmax Oil Tanker	1991	140,000
371	Žirje	Handy Bulk Carrier	1990	48,000
366	Promina	Handy Bulk Carrier	1990	48,000
364	Pacific Frigo	Reefer Vessel	1990	11,000
362	Jahre Traveller	Suezmax Oil Tanker	1990	140,000
361	Jahre Target	Suezmax Oil Tanker	1990	140,000
363	Atlantic Frigo	Reefer Vessel	1989	11,000
360	Jahre Traider	Suezmax Oil Tanker	1989	142,031
359	Jahre Transporter	Suezmax Oil Tanker	1989	142,031
358	Šibenik	Handy Bulk Carrier	1989	48,320
357	Isabella	Car Passenger Ferry	1989	4,105
356	Amorella	Car Passenger Ferry	1988	4,105
355	Georgij Ordzenikidze	Product Tanker	1988	16,231
354	Akademik Uznadze	Product Tanker	1988	16,231
353	Ilia Chavchavadze	Product Tanker	1988	16,231
351	Prorvin	Trailing Suction Hopper Dredger	1988	1,949
350	Perekopskiy	Trailing Suction Hopper Dredger	1988	1,949
352	Akademik Vekua	Product Tanker	1987	16,231
349	Tamanskiy	Trailing Suction Hopper Dredger	1987	1,949
347	Kriti Color	Handy Oil Tanker	1987	43,305
346	Kriti Champion	Handy Oil Tanker	1987	45,308
339	Zadar	Handy Oil Tanker	1987	45,222
345	Kriti Palm	Handy Oil Tanker	1986	45,184
344	Kriti Filoxentia	Handy Oil Tanker	1986	45,263
335	Astrakhan	Trailing Suction Hopper Dredger	1985	2,044
334	Tiligulskiy	Trailing Suction Hopper Dredger	1985	2,044
333	Belomorskiy	Trailing Suction Hopper Dredger	1985	2,044
332	Kapitan Yerishov	Product Tanker	1985	16,354
331	Nata Vachnadze	Product Tanker	1985	16,354
330	Yasup Kobaladze	Product Tanker	1985	16,354
329	David Bakradze	Product Tanker	1985	16,354
328	Bolshevik Kamo	Product Tanker	1985	16,354
327	Kapitan Makatsariya	Product Tanker	1985	16,354
326	Kapitan A. Kacharava	Product Tanker	1984	16,354
325	Kapitan Naganyuk	Product Tanker	1984	16,354
324	Josip Broz Tito	Product Tanker	1984	16,354
321	Bihać	Bulk Carrier	1984	29,651
319	Šolta	Bulk Carrier	1984	29,662
316	Mediteran Frigo	Refrigerated Cargo Vessel	1984	9,756
313	Iver Split	Chemical Carrier	1984	39,723
320	Mljet	Bulk Carrier	1983	29,643
315	Dalmacija Frigo	Refrigerated Cargo Vessel	1983	9,809
314	Mobil Courage	Chemical Carrier	1983	39,776
312	Iver Swift	Chemical Carrier	1983	39,723
307	Atlas Exporter	Chemical Carrier	1983	39,782
311	Intermar Transporter	Product Tanker	1982	45,396
310	Intermar Trader	Product Tanker	1982	44,592
306	Atlas Mariner	Chemical Carrier	1982	39,821
309	Lake Anina	Chemical Carrier	1981	26,060
308	Lake Anne	Chemical Carrier	1981	26,060
305	Primorje	Trailing Suction Hopper Dredger	1981	1,964
303	Račišće	Refrigerated Cargo Vessel	1981	9,750
304	Irbensky	Trailing Suction Hopper Dredger	1980	1,964
302	Hong QI189	Bulk Carrier	1980	4,887
301	Hong QI188	Bulk Carrier	1980	4,887
300	Hong QI187	Bulk Carrier	1980	4,887
299	Hong QI186	Bulk Carrier	1980	4,887
298	Hong QI185	Bulk Carrier	1980	4,887
297	River Maje	Cargo Liner	1980	16,489
296	River Ogbese	Cargo Liner	1980	16,479
295	River Oshum	Cargo Liner	1980	16,485
294	River Gurara	Cargo Liner	1980	16,329
293	River Majidun	Cargo Liner	1979	16,333
292	River Oli	Cargo Liner	1979	16,459
291	River Oji	Cargo Liner	1979	16,487
290	River Adada	Cargo Liner	1979	16,487
288	Žirje	Bulk Carrier	1979	30,084
287	Jablanica	Bulk Carrier	1979	30,084
286	Tuapse	Oil Product Tanker	1979	23,876
285	Lipetsk	Oil Product Tanker	1978	23,876
284	Ashkhabad	Oil Product Tanker	1978	23,876
283	Professor Rylke	Multipurpoe Cargo Ship	1978	16,000
281	Apure	Multipurpose Cargo Ship	1978	12,858
280	Monagas	Multipurpose Cargo Ship	1978	12,831
277	Ypatia Halcoussi	OBO Carrier	1978	84,133
289	Transporter V	Pontoon	1977	1,500
282	Profesor Merzejewski	Multipurpose Cargo Ship	1977	16,000
279	Ain Taurga	Oil Product Carrier	1977	30,643
278	Elrakwa	Oil Product Carrier	1977	30,671
276	Pericles Halcoussis	OBO Carrier	1977	84,137
271	Vallabhai Patel	OBO Carrier	1977	114,150
275	Kutaisi	Product Tanker	1976	24,000
270	Vallathol	OBO Carrier	1976	114,150
274	Sukhumi	Product Tanker	1975	24,000
273	Excomm Mariner	OBO Carrier	1975	83,240
272	Excomm Merchant	OBO Carrier	1975	85,000
269	Zakir Hussain	Product Tanker	1975	115,000
265	Rajendra Prasad	Tanker	1975	115,000
268	Longlin	Cargo Liner	1974	13,000
267	Taolin	Cargo Liner	1974	13,430
266	Hulin	Cargo Liner	1974	13,000
263	Carisle	OBO Carrier	1974	76,830
261	Abul Kalam Azad	OBO Carrier	1974	114,000
264	Chunlin	Cargo Liner	1973	13,000
262	Songlin	Cargo Liner	1973	13,482
260	Carcape	OBO Carrier	1973	76,700
259	British Humber	Product Tanker	1973	22,500
255	Yanglin	Cargo Liner	1973	13,000
254	Motilal Nehru	OBO Carrier	1973	116,000
251	Tianlin	Cargo Liner	1973	13,425
257	Annitsa Carras	OBO Carrier	1972	85,130
256	Archontissa Katingo	OBO Carrier	1972	85,410
252	Diamantis Pateras	OBO Carrier	1972	76,930
249	Carbay	OBO Carrier	1972	73,378
248	Yulin	Cargo Liner	1972	13,307
253	Capetan Carras	OBO Carrier	1971	77,000
246	Carlantic	OBO Carrier	1971	73,300
244	Toluca	Fast Cargo Liner Convertible To Container Ship	1971	16,400
242	Monterrey	Fast Cargo Liner Convertible To Container Ship	1971	16,400
231	Batumi	Product Tanker	1971	20,800
230	Stepan Vostretsov	Product Carrier	1971	20,800
229	Sovjetskoi Gruzii	Product Carrier	1971	20,800
241	Lal Bahadur Shastri	Oil Tanker	1970	88,000
228	Mitrofan Sedin	Product Carrier	1970	20,800
227	Mos Shovgenov	Product Carrier	1970	20,800
226	Epifan Kovtjuh	Product Carrier	1970	20,800
225	Dimitrij Zhloba	Product Carrier	1970	20,800
224	Kutaisi	Product Carrier	1970	20,800
240	British Fidelity	Product Carrier	1969	22,500
239	British Unity	Product Carrier	1969	22,500
238	Damodar Tasaka	Bulk Carrier	1969	43,800
237	Jawaharlal Nehru	Oil Tanker	1969	88,000
235	Damodar Tanabe	Bulk Carrier	1969	43,800
223	Nikoloz Baratashvili	Product Carrier	1969	20,800
236	Sunderbans	Cargo Liner	1968	12,400
234	Moenjodaro	Cargo Liner	1968	12,400
232	Archontas	Bulk Carrier	1968	46,000
217	Taxila	Cargo Liner	1968	12,400
216	Makarska	Cargo Liner	1968	8,000
214	Trinaesti Juli	Bulk Carrier	1968	28,000
206	Prvi Februar	Bulk Carrier	1968	28,000
233	Rangamati	Cargo Liner	1968	12,400
222	General Karbishev	Product Carrier	1967	20,800
221	Gori	Product Carrier	1967	20,800
220	Borzhomi	Product Carrier	1967	20,800
215	Rimon	Log / Fruit Carrier	1967	7,540
213	Sisak	Bulk Carrier	1967	41,000
212	Bosanka	Bulk Carrier	1967	28,000
210	Tamar	Log / Fruit Carrier	1967	7,540
205	Split	Cargo Liner	1967	8,000
204	Alka	Cargo Liner	1966	8,000
211	Bagh-E-Dacca	Cargo Liner	1966	12,800
209	General Zhdanov	Product Carrier	1966	20,800
207	Marshal Birjuzov	Product Carrier	1966	20,800
208	Petr Alekseev	Product Carrier	1966	20,800
203	Banija	Bulk Carrier	1966	28,000
198	Oleko Dundich	Product Carrier	1966	20,800
202	Kalliopi Pateras	Bulk Carrier	1965	24,000
201	Chenab	Cargo Liner	1965	12,860
200	Treis Ierarchai	Bulk Carrier	1965	24,000
197	Vasilij Porik	Product Carrier	1965	20,800
194	Grigorij Achkanov	Product Carrier	1965	20,800
193	Daugavpils	Product Carrier	1965	20,800
188	Split	Product Carrier	1965	20,800
190	Bagh-E-Karachi	Cargo Liner	1964	12,860
187	Abasin	Cargo Liner	1964	12,860
181	Nestos	Bulk Carrier	1964	24,000
180	Plitvice	Bulk Carrier	1964	15,050
177	Admiral Zmajević	Cargo Liner	1964	12,300
175	Kapetan Martinović	Cargo Liner	1964	12,300
185	Evros	Bulk Carrier	1963	24,010
184	Meandros	Bulk Carrier	1963	23,993
183	Arhangelos	Bulk Carrier	1963	23,960
182	Teofano Livanos	Bulk Carrier	1963	24,012
174	Grobnik	Cargo Liner	1963	6,450
172	Drežnica	Cargo Liner	1963	6,140
170	Kragujevac	Cargo Ship	1963	15,049
178	E.H. Bird	Bulk Carrier-Collier	1962	23,145
176	Wieniawski	Multipurpose Cargo Ship	1962	12,499
171	Nowowiejski	Multipurpose Cargo Ship	1962	12,499
169	Rosa Da Fonseca	Passenger Liner	1962	10,400
167	Lago Lacar	Multipurpose Cargo Ship	1962	10,457
165	Split	Bulk Carrier-Collier	1962	22,000
163	Lago Traful	Multipurpose Cargo Ship	1962	10,231
168	Szymanowski	Multipurpose Cargo Ship	1961	12,695
166	Novi Vinodolski	Cargo Liner	1961	6,359
164	Baška	Cargo Liner	1961	6,495
162	Lago Nahuel Huapi	Multipurpose Cargo Ship	1961	10,272
161	Paderewski	Multipurpose Cargo Ship	1960	12,467
160	Natko Nodilo	Multipurpose Cargo Ship	1960	13,001
159	Moniuszko	Multipurpose Cargo Ship	1960	12,450
158	Iž	Oil Tanker	1960	20,100
157	Marin Držić	Multipurpose Cargo Ship	1960	15,256
156	Luka Botić	Multipurpose Cargo Ship	1960	13,000
155	Ivan Gundulić	Multipurpose Cargo Ship	1960	12,977
154	Zamenhof	Multipurpose Cargo Ship	1959	12,838
153	Ruđer Bošković	Multipurpose Cargo Ship	1959	12,983
152	Chopin	Multipurpose Cargo Ship	1959	12,838
151	Celerina	Multipurpose Cargo Ship	1959	12,953
150	Marko Marulić	Multipurpose Cargo Ship	1959	12,986
147	Sunrise	Multipurpose Cargo Ship	1959	13,122
146	Matang	Multipurpose Cargo Ship	1959	13,059
145	Corviglia	Multipurpose Cargo Ship	1958	12,864
144	Cruzeiro Do Sul	Multipurpose Cargo Ship	1958	12,800
143	Carina	Multipurpose Cargo Ship	1958	12,800
142	Wasaborg	Multipurpose Cargo Ship	1958	12,800
140	D-51-10	Oil Tanker	1958	500
132	Jedinstvo	Passenger Liner	1958	2,600
148	Petka	Multipurpose Cargo Ship	1957	10,150
139	Nikola Tesla	Multipurpose Cargo Ship	1957	10,150
138	Skojevac	Harbour Tug	1957	
137	N/A	Harbour Tug	1957	
131	Jadran	Passenger Liner	1957	2,600
129	Marjan	Multipurpose Cargo Ship	1957	10,270
130	Jugoslavija	Passenger Liner	1956	2,600
136	P.R.36	Harbour Tug	1957	
123	D233	Work Boat	1956	
122	D234	Work Boat	1956	
121	D235	Work Boat	1956	
120	D236	Work Boat	1956	
119	D237	Work Boat	1956	
118	D238	Work Boat	1956	
128	Ohrid	Coastal Passenger Ship	1955	191
127	Valjevo	Coastal Passenger Ship	1955	191
126	Karlovac	Coastal Passenger Ship	1955	191
117	Perast	Torpedo Carrier	1955	
116	Igalo	Torpedo Carrier	1955	
115	Zelenika	Torpedo Carrier	1955	
114	Prčanj	Torpedo Carrier	1955	
113	Rtanj	Torpedo Carrier	1955	
112	Risan	Torpedo Carrier	1955	
111	N/A	Stone Carrying Barge	1955	450
110	N/A	Stone Carrying Barge	1955	450
109	N/A	Stone Carrying Barge	1954	450
108	N/A	Stone Carrying Barge	1954	450
92	Č80	Coastal Patrol Boat	1955	90
70	N/A	Coastal Cargo Ship	1955	130
69	N/A	Coastal Cargo Ship	1955	130
68	N/A	Coastal Cargo Ship	1955	130
67	N/A	Coastal-Cargo Ship K-01	1955	130
66	N/A	Coastal Cargo Ship	1955	130
65	N/A	Coastal Cargo Ship	1955	130
64	N/A	Coastal Cargo Ship	1954	130
63	N/A	Coastal Cargo Ship	1954	130
62	N/A	Coastal Cargo Ship	1954	130
61	N/A	Coastal Cargo Ship	1954	130
60	N/A	Coastal Cargo Ship	1954	130
59	N/A	Coastal Cargo Ship	1954	130
58	N/A	Coastal Cargo Ship	1953	130
57	N/A	Coastal Cargo Ship	1953	130
56	N/A	Coastal Cargo Ship	1953	130
55	N/A	Coastal Cargo Ship	1953	130
54	N/A	Coastal Cargo Ship	1953	130
53	N/A	Coastal Cargo Ship	1953	130
52	N/A	Coastal Cargo Ship	1953	130
51	N/A	Coastal Cargo Ship	1952	130
50	N/A	Coastal Cargo Ship	1952	130
49	N/A	Coastal Cargo Ship	1952	130
48	N/A	Coastal Cargo Ship	1952	130
47	N/A	Coastal Cargo Ship	1952	130
46	N/A	Coastal Cargo Ship	1952	130
45	N/A	Coastal Cargo Ship	1951	130
44	N/A	Coastal Cargo Ship	1951	130
43	N/A	Coastal Cargo Ship	1951	130
42	N/A	Coastal Cargo Ship	1951	130
41	N/A	Patrol Boat	1951	130
40	N/A	Patrol Boat	1940	
39	N/A	Patrol Boat	1940	
38	N/A	Patrol Boat	1940	
37	N/A	Patrol Boat	1940	
36	N/A	Patrol Boat	1940	
35	N/A	Patrol Boat	1940	
34	N/A	Patrol Boat	1940	
33	N/A	Patrol Boat	1940	
32	N/A	Patrol Boat	1940	
30	Split	Destroyer	1958	1,850
29	Mosor	Patrol Boat	1940	123
28	Velebit	Patrol Boat	1940	123
31	N/A		1939	
27	Šumadija	Coastal-Passenger Cargo Steamer	1939	472
26	Sarajevo	Coastal-Passenger Cargo Steamer	1939	472
23	Ljubljana	Torpedo Ship	1939	1,210
22	Zagreb	Torpedo Ship	1939	1,210
21	Konjic	Steam Port Tugboat, Irony	1937	
24	Lala Iv	Power Boat, Irony	1936	
20	U-4	Barge For Carbon	1935	
18	N/A	Power Boat, Wooden	1934	
17	N/A	Barkasa, Wooden	1934	
16	N/A	Power Boat, Wooden	1934	
15	Strelica	Small Boat For Sailing Boat	1934	
14	Strela	International Class Of Sailing Boats, Wooden	1934	
13	Vodomar	Power Sailing Boat, Wooden	1934	
12	N/A	Small Boat For Cruiser, Wooden	1934	
11	N/A	Small Boat For Cruiser, Wooden	1934	
10	N/A	Power Boat, Wooden	1934	
9	Nerežinka I	Power Boat, Wooden	1934	
8	N/A	Wooden Barge For Salt	1934	50
7	N/A	Wooden Barge For Salt	1934	50
6	N/A	Wooden Barge For Salt	1934	50
5	N/A	Wooden Barge For Salt	1934	50
4	N/A	Wooden Barge For Salt	1934	50
3	N/A	Wooden Barge For Salt	1934	50
2	N/A	Tuna Ship, Wooden	1934	
1	N/A	Barkasa, Wooden	1933	
Source: Brodosplit

Ships built by Brodosplit BSO
Yard no	Name	Type	Year	DWT
525	Klara	Three-Mast Schooner	2019	140
540	Omiš	Coastal Patrol Vessel	2018	250
545	N/A	The Hull And Superstructure Of The Vessel For Nautical Tourism	2017	160
546	N/A	The Hull And Superstructure Of The Vessel For Nautical Tourism	2017	
538	N/A	The Hull And Superstructure Of The Vessel For Nautical Tourism	2017	490
784	Monet	Passenger Cruise Ship	2016	
539	Aiaxaia	The Hull And Superstructure Of The Vessel For Nautical Tourism	2016	
537	Kapetan Bota	The Hull And Superstructure Of The Vessel For Nautical Tourism	2015	
536	Carpe Diem	The Hull And Superstructure Of The Vessel For Nautical Tourism	2015	
524	Katina	Luxury Motor Yacht	2015	220
530	Admiral	The Hull And Superstructure Of The Vessel For Nautical Tourism	2014	
533	N/A	The Hull And Superstructure Of The Vessel For Nautical Tourism	2014	
521	Amalia	The Hull And Superstructure Of The Vessel For Nautical Tourism	2013	
522	Providnost	The Hull And Superstructure Of The Vessel For Nautical Tourism	2013	
523	Splendid	The Hull And Superstructure Of The Vessel For Nautical Tourism	2013	
519	Caspian Star	Luxury Motor Yacht	2012	
520	Futura	The Hull And Superstructure Of The Vessel For Nautical Tourism	2012	
515	Jadran	Car/Passenger Ferry 138	2010	3,224
513	Bios Dva	Oceanographic Vessel	2009	315
514	Biokovo	Car/Passenger Ferry 138	2009	3,224
509	Arethusa	Passenger Cruise Ship	2008	1,206
507	Athena	Passenger Cruise Ship	2007	1,206
508	Artemis	Passenger Cruise Ship	2007	1,206
505	Konstruktor I	Barge	2006	760
506	Rubinum	Passenger Ferry	2006	130
503	Cres	Car/Passenger Ferry 100	2005	1,350
504	Marjan	Search And Rescue Craft	2005	
501	Planac	Search And Rescue Craft	2004	
599	Supetar	Car/Passenger Ferry 100	2004	1,350
502	Umag	Search And Rescue Craft	2004	
598	Plovput 7	Fast Workboat	2004	
596	Plovput 5	Fast Workboat	2003	
597	Plovput 6	Fast Workboat	2003	
589	Šibenik	Search And Rescue Vessel	2002	
590	Danče	Search And Rescue Vessel	2002	
595	Plovput 4	Fast Workboat	2002	
588	Vid	Search And Rescue Vessel	2001	
594	Plovput 3	Fast Workboat	2001	
593	Plovput 2	Fast Workboat	2000	
587	Pojišan	Search And Rescue Vessel	1999	
584	Plovput 1	Fast Workboat	1998	
585	Laslovo	Car/Passenger Ferry 36	1997	485
586	Ston	Car/Passenger Ferry 36	1997	485
583	Velebit	Midget Submarine	1996	88
575	Krka	Landing Ship-Minelayer	1995	1,000
582	N/A	SDV Type R-1 & Type R-2	1994	
574	Cetina	Landing Ship-Minelayer	1993	1,000
581	Transporter 3	Multipurpose Barge	1993	4,500
531	Kupa	Midget Submarine	1989	88
532	Vardar	Midget Submarine	1989	88
578	PSN - 97	Fuel Barge	1989	184
579	PSN - 98	Fuel Barge	1989	184
576	PSN - 95	Fuel Barge	1988	184
577	PSN - 96	Fuel Barge	1988	184
563	PPKS-17	Ship-Painting Station	1987	550
564	PPKS-18	Ship-Painting Station	1987	550
565	PPKS-21	Ship-Painting Station	1987	550
566	PPKS-22	Ship-Painting Station	1987	550
567	PPKS-23	Ship-Painting Station	1987	550
568	PPKS-24	Ship-Painting Station	1987	550
569	PPKS-25	Ship-Painting Station	1987	550
570	PPKS-26	Ship-Painting Station	1987	550
571	PPKS-27	Ship-Painting Station	1987	550
522	Zeta	Midget Submarine	1987	88
523	Soča	Midget Submarine	1987	88
527	Krk	Landing Ship-Minelayer	1986	1,000
560	PPKS-15 Sevastopolj	Ship-Painting Station	1986	550
561	PPKS-16	Ship-Painting Station	1986	550
562	PPKS-19	Ship-Painting Station	1986	550
515	Tisa	Midget Submarine	1985	88
516	Una	Midget Submarine	1985	88
518	Kit	Multipurpose Transportation	1984	600
528	N/A	Diver's Submersible Type R1	1984	
529	N/A	Diver's Submersible Type R2	1984	
517	Ugor	Multipurpose Transportation	1983	600
513	Lubin	Multipurpose Transportation	1982	600
509	Hajar Dewantara	Training Ship	1981	2,050
N/A	Drava	Submarine Type 1000	1980	830
507	Ibn Majid	Training Ship	1980	2,050
N/A	Sava	Submarine Type 1000	1978	830
N/A	Uskok	Attack Submarine	1970	705
N/A	Junak	Attack Submarine	1969	705
N/A	Heroj	Attack Submarine	1968	705
Source: Brodosplit

== See also ==
- List of companies of the Socialist Federal Republic of Yugoslavia
