= Calypso =

Calypso, Calipso, Kalypso, Kalipso, may refer to:

== Arts and entertainment ==
=== Mythological and fictional entities ===
- Calypso (mythology), a nymph who imprisoned Odysseus for seven years
- Calypso (nymphs), various other nymphs
- Calypso (comics), a Marvel Comics character
- Calypso, a character in mythology novels by Rick Riordan
- Calypso, or Tia Dalma, a Pirates of the Caribbean movie character
- Calypso (dog), a dog from the animated TV show Bluey
- Calypso, a character from the Twisted Metal video game series
- Planet Calypso, a location in Entropia Universe
- UNS Calypso, a starship in Alien Legacy

=== Literature ===
- "Calypso", an episode in James Joyce's novel Ulysses
- Calypso (book), a 2018 essay collection by David Sedaris

=== Music ===
- Calypso music, a genre of Trinidadian folk music
- Calypso (album), by Harry Belafonte
- "Calypso" (John Denver song), 1975
- "Calypso" (Luis Fonsi and Stefflon Don song), 2018
- "Calypso" (Spiderbait song), 1997
- "Calypso", a song by France Gall from the 1984 album Débranche!
- "Calypso", a song by Jean-Michel Jarre from Waiting for Cousteau
- "Calypso", a song by Suzanne Vega from the 1987 album Solitude Standing
- "Calypso", a song by Bryson Tiller from the 2024 album Bryson Tiller
- "Calipso" (song), by Charlie Charles and Dardust, 2019

=== Television ===
- Calypso (TV series), a Venezuelan telenovela
- "Calypso", an episode of Star Trek: Short Treks
- "Calypso", an episode of Bluey
- Calipso TV, Venezuela TV channel

== People ==
- Calypso (painter), 3rd century BC Greek painter
- Calypso Rose (born 1940), Trinidadan musician
- Kalypso Nicolaïdis (born 1962), a Franco-Grecian academic
- Kalipso Chalkidou (born 1976), a Greek physician
- Juno Calypso (born 1989), UK photographer
- Charlotte Di Calypso (born 1990), French fashion model

== Places ==
- Calypso Cliffs, Bowman Inlet, Antarctica
- Calypso Deep, the deepest point of the Mediterranean Sea
- Calypso, North Carolina, a town in the United States
- Calypso Park, Limoges, Ontario, Canada; a Canadian theme waterpark
- Calypso (moon), a moon of Saturn
- 53 Kalypso, an asteroid

== Science and technology ==
- Calypso (electronic ticketing system)
- Calypso (email client), later called Courier
- Kalypso (software), an open source modelling program
- HP Calypso, a PDA from Hewlett-Packard
- Calypso (plant), an orchid genus containing a single species Calypso bulbosa
- Calypso bean, a bean cultivar of the species Phaseolus vulgaris

== Transportation ==
- Boeing Starliner Calypso, a space capsule
- Ultracraft Calypso, a Belgian light aircraft design
- Calypso (ship), the name of several ships
- M/S Kalypso, a cruiseferry
- Greek ship Kalypso (M64), a Greek minehunter
- Italian torpedo boat Calipso

== Other uses ==
- CALIPSO, a satellite
- Calypso (camera), an underwater camera
- Calypso (typeface)
- Calypso Technology, later Adenza
- Calypso Lemonade, a lemonade company
- Kalypso Media, a video game developer

== See also ==
- List of calypso musicians
- Calypso's Cave, a cave in Gozo, Malta
- Chalypso, a dance
- Calypso Rupes, a ridgeline on Mercury
