= Calypso (ship) =

Several vessels have been named Calypso for the figure from Greek mythology.

- Calypso was a snow of 47 tons (bm), built in Dublin in 1792. On 21 June 1796 she sailed, probably from Liverpool, as a slave ship in the triangular trade in enslaved people. "Renau's squadron" captured her on the Windward Coast of Africa; her master ransomed her. She then completed her voyage, arriving at Barbados on 1 June 1797 with 79 slaves. She then disappears from online records.
- Calypso, of 190 tons (bm), was built in Bermuda in 1795. The Sierra Leone Company purchased her circa 1796 to support their settlement in Sierra Leone. A French privateer under Spanish colours captured Calypso, Cole, master, in February 1798 as Calypso was going down the Gold Coast from Sierra Leone.
- RV Calypso is a former British Royal Navy minesweeper converted into a research vessel for the oceanographic researcher Jacques Cousteau, equipped with a mobile laboratory for underwater field research. She was severely damaged in 1996 and was planned to undergo a complete refurbishment in 2009–2011.
- MS The Calypso, a cruiseliner
- SS Calypso, an ocean liner
- French ship Calypso, the name of several ships of France
- HMS Calypso, the name of several vessels of the British Royal Navy
- USS Calypso, the name of several vessels of the U.S. Navy

== Ship classes ==
- Calypso-class corvette, a British Royal Navy steam corvette class
- Calypso-class spéronare, a French Navy sail transport class

== See also ==
- MS Kalypso, a cruiseferry
- Italian torpedo boat Calipso
- Greek ship Kalypso (M64), a Greek minehunter
- Calypso (disambiguation)
