= Eucalyptus (disambiguation) =

Eucalyptus is a diverse genus of flowering trees in the myrtle family.

Eucalyptus may also refer to:

- Eucalyptus (Avey Tare album) (2017)
- Eucalyptus (Pitchfork album) (1990)
- Eucalyptus (novel), a novel by Murray Bail
- Eucalyptus (film), projected adaptation of the novel
- Eucalyptus (software), computer software for cloud computing

== See also ==
- Calypso (disambiguation)
- Eucalypt
- Encalypta
