= Juno Calypso =

British photographer that makes self-portraits

Juno Calypso (born 1989) is a British photographer. Her self-portraits are personal works about feminism, isolation, loneliness and being self-sufficient. Working alone, Calypso has made highly stylised photographs of herself whilst dressed as a fictional alter-ego, "Joyce", in unusual surroundings. She also works as a commercial photographer.

Calypso was joint winner of the British Journal of Photography International Photography Award in 2016. In 2018 she received the Vic Odden Award from the Royal Photographic Society.

== Early life and education ==
Calypso was born in Hackney, London in 1989. She gained an Art Foundation Diploma from Chelsea College of Arts (University of the Arts London) in 2008 and a BA in Photography from London College of Communication (University of the Arts London) in 2012.

== Life and work ==
For her personal work, working alone, Calypso has photographed highly stylised self-portraits of herself whilst costumed as a fictional alter-ego, "Joyce", a "bored, frustrated, lonely housewife of her imagination", in unfamiliar, unusual and over-the-top surroundings.

For her series Joyce, Calypso photographed herself in various hotel rooms. The work is about the "oppressive elements of femininity", its "restrictive beauty regimes and modern rituals of seduction". She has said "I'm trying to make a perfect photograph of a woman trying to create a perfect vision of herself."

In The Honeymoon series, she photographed herself alone in an American couples-only honeymoon resort. Nell Frizzell wrote in The Guardian that "there is a sense of airless claustrophobia about much of Calypso’s work. But in the Honeymoon Hotel pictures, that frustration is twinned with loneliness." Alexandra Genova wrote in Time that her "work is a delicate dance between comedy and despair."

Calypso has said:

I used to take pictures of Joyce as a way of making a critique on the laboured construction of femininity, but now I’m starting to see that the problem isn’t the make-up and bizarre body improvement devices, but the way society treats women who invest so deeply in their appearance."

She also works as a commercial photographer.

== Publications with contributions by Calypso ==
- The Catlin Art Guide: New Artists in the UK. Catlin Holdings, 2013. By Justin Hammond. ISBN 978-0956457035.
- It's Nice That Annual. London: It's Nice That, 2013.
- Mossless 4: Public/Private/Portrait. Brooklyn, NY: Romke Hoogwaerts; New York: International Center of Photography, 2016. ISBN 978-0692712399.
- Girl on Girl: Art and Photography in the Age of the Female Gaze. London: Laurence King, 2017. By Charlotte Jansen. ISBN 978-1780679556.
- Firecrackers: Female Photographers Now. London: Thames & Hudson, 2017. By Fiona Rogers and Max Houghton. ISBN 978-0500544747.

== Short films ==
- The Linda Evans Rejuvenique Facial Toning System (2012)
- Empty Pleasures (2012)
- The Making of Joyce (2014)
- The Honeymoon Suite (2015)

== Awards ==
- 2013: Winner, Visitor Vote, Catlin Art Prize, XL Catlin
- 2016: Joint winner, British Journal of Photography International Photography Award, for Joyce. The other winner was Felicity Hammond.
- 2016: One of 24 selected, Foam Talent Call, Foam Fotografiemuseum Amsterdam
- 2018: Vic Odden Award, Royal Photographic Society, Bath

== Solo exhibitions ==
- Artist of the Day, selected by Tom Hunter, Flowers Gallery, London, 2015
- 71a Presents: Juno Calypso, 71a Gallery, London, October 2015
- What to Do with a Million Years, TJ Boulting, London, May–June 2018; Studio Giangaleazzo Visconti, Milan, Italy, 2018/2019

== See also ==
- Cindy Sherman
- Petra Collins
- Petra Cortright
- Christto & Andrew
