= USS Calypso =

USS Calypso has been the name of more than one United States Navy ship, and may refer to:

- USS Calypso (1863), an armed steamer in commission from 1863 to 1865
- USS Calypso (SP-632), a patrol boat in commission from 1917 to 1919
- USS Calypso (AG-35), an auxiliary ship in commission from 1941 to 1942

== See also ==
- Calypso (ship)
