= Cruiseferry =

Type of cruise ship

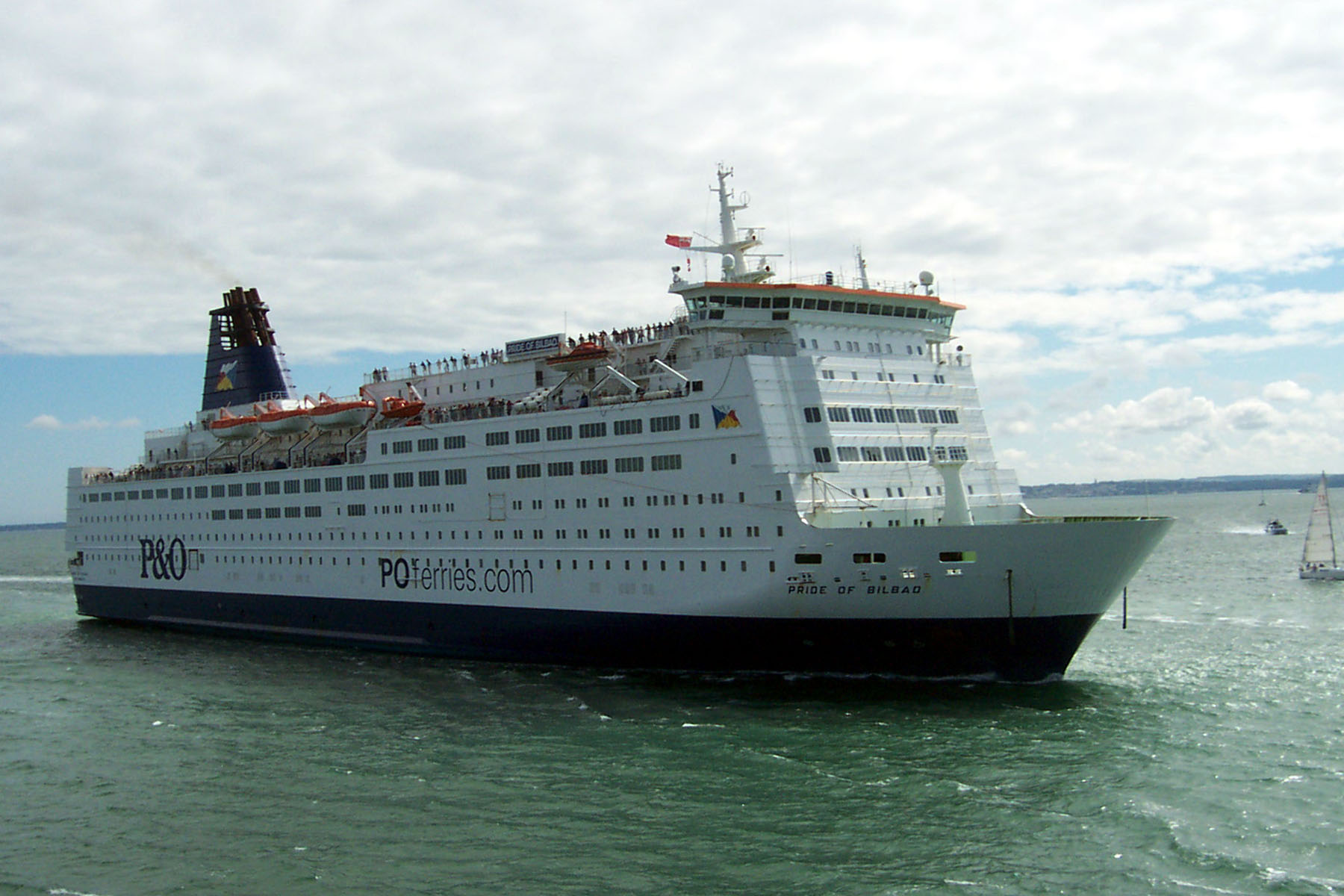
Pride of Bilbao (now Moby Orli), an archetypical cruiseferry. Built for Rederi AB Slite for the Baltic cruise market and operated until 2010 by P&O Ferries between Portsmouth in the UK and Bilbao in the Basque Country, Spain. She was sold by Irish Continental Group at the end of her charter to P&O Ferries in 2010 and the operated for St. Peter Line among Stockholm, Tallinn, Helsinki and Saint Petersburg, before being moved to Italy.

A cruiseferry or cruise ferry is a ship that combines the features of a cruise ship and a Ro-Pax (roll-on/roll-off passenger) ferry. Many passengers travel with the ships for the cruise experience, staying only a few hours at the destination port or not leaving the ship at all, while others use the ships as means of transportation. Some operators prefer to refer to them as "cruise ships with car decks"

Cruiseferries are most common in the seas of Northern Europe, especially the Baltic Sea and the North Sea. However, similar ships traffic across the English Channel as well as the Irish Sea, Mediterranean and even on the North Atlantic. Cruiseferries also operate from India, China and Australia.

== Baltic Sea cruiseferries ==
In the northern Baltic Sea, two major rival companies, Viking Line and Silja Line, have for decades competed on the routes between Turku and Helsinki in Finland and Sweden's capital Stockholm. Since the 1990s Tallink has also risen as a major company in the area, culminating with the acquisition of Silja Line in 2006.

While superficially resembling cruise ships that operate primarily in tropical climates, Baltic cruiseferries will have windows rather than balconies for cabins/suites, plus a higher hull and promenade deck with higher positioning of lifeboats (the height above water called the freeboard), a longer bow, and for additional strength they are often designed with thicker hull plating than is found on cruise ships, as well as a deeper draft for greater stability. Cruise ferries share the above attributes with ocean liners to protect against large waves and stormy weather, since cruise ferries are expected to ply the Baltic Sea year-round while cruise ships can only do so in the summer.

The largest Baltic cruiseferries offer many of the amenities found on contemporary cruise ships, including a wide range of restaurants, entertainment options, and health and fitness facilities. However, on cruiseferries, many of these facilities such as the pool deck and shopping arcade are fully enclosed due to the cool Baltic climate. Cruiseferry cabins are typically smaller as voyages are only one or two nights, food is generally not included in cruise ferry fares, whereas cruise ships usually have itineraries lasting three nights or more and fares are all inclusive.

== List of largest cruiseferries of their time ==
The term "cruiseferry" did not come into use until the 1980s, although it has been retroactively applied to earlier ferries that have large cabin capabilities and public spaces in addition to their car- and passenger-carrying capacity.

Year	Name	Tonnage^{1}	Company	Traffic area	Flag	Notes
1956	Akdeniz	8,809 GRT	Turkish Maritime Lines	Mediterranean Sea	Turkey	Built 1955
1975	MS Belorussiya	16,331 GRT	Black Sea Shipping Company	Black Sea	Soviet Union	Alongside five identical sisters built 1975–76
1976	MS Napoléon	20,079 GRT	SNCM	Mediterranean Sea	France	Sent to Comarit in 2002.
1977	Finnjet	24,605 GRT	Enso-Gutzeit (Finnlines traffic)	Baltic Sea	Finland	Gas turbine-powered. Also fastest and longest
1981	Finlandia	25,905 GRT	Effoa (Silja Line traffic)	Baltic Sea	Finland	Alongside identical sister MS Silvia Regina
1982	Scandinavia	26,747 GT	Scandinavian World Cruises, later DFDS Seaways	New York—Bahamas, Copenhagen—Oslo	Denmark	
1985	Svea	33,829 GT	Johnson Line (Silja Line traffic)	Baltic Sea	Sweden	
1985	Mariella	37,799 GT	SF Line (Viking Line traffic)	Baltic Sea	Finland	
1989	Athena	40,012 GT	Rederi AB Slite (Viking Line traffic)	Baltic Sea	Sweden	
1989	Cinderella	46,398 GT	SF Line (Viking Line traffic)	Baltic Sea	Finland	
1990	Silja Serenade	58,376 GT	Silja Line	Baltic Sea	Finland	
1991	Silja Symphony	58,377 GT	Silja Line	Baltic Sea	Sweden	
1993	Silja Europa	59,914 GT	Tallink	Baltic Sea	Estonia	Ordered by Rederi AB Slite for Viking Line traffic
2001	Pride of Rotterdam	59,925 GT	P&O Ferries	North Sea	Netherlands	
2001	Pride of Hull	59,925 GT	P&O Ferries	North Sea	Netherlands	
2004	Color Fantasy	75,027 GT	Color Line	Kattegat, Skagerrak	Norway	
2007	Color Magic	75,100 GT	Color Line	Kattegat, Skagerrak	Norway	
^{1}May be specified in gross tonnage (GT) or gross register tons (GRT).

== List of cruiseferry operators ==
=== Åland ===
- (Åland) Eckerö Linjen
- (Finland) ( (Åland) ) Viking Line

=== Australia ===
- (Australia) Spirit of Tasmania

=== Canada ===
- (Canada) BC Ferries
- (Canada) Marine Atlantic

=== Croatia ===
- (Croatia) Jadrolinija

=== Denmark ===
- (Denmark) DFDS Seaways

=== Estonia ===
- (Estonia) Tallink

=== Faroe Islands ===
- (Faroe Islands) Smyril Line

=== Finland ===
- (Finland) Eckerö Line
- (Finland) Silja Line (operated by (Estonia) Tallink)
- (Finland) ( (Åland) ) Viking Line
- (Finland) Finnlines
- (Finland) Wasa Line
- (Finland) ( (Estonia) ) Helsinki Cruises Line

=== France ===
- (France) Brittany Ferries
- (France) Corsica Ferries - Sardinia Ferries
- (France) Corsica Linea

=== Greece ===
- (Greece) ANEK Lines
- (Greece) Blue Star Ferries
- (Greece) Hellenic Seaways
- (Greece) LANE Lines
- (Greece) Levante Ferries
- (Greece) Minoan Lines
- (Greece) NEL Lines
- (Greece) Superfast Ferries
- (Greece) Ventouris Ferries

=== Hong Kong ===
- Genting Hong Kong (defunct)

=== Ireland ===
- (Republic of Ireland) Brittany Ferries
- (Republic of Ireland) DFDS Seaways
- (Republic of Ireland) Irish Ferries
- (Republic of Ireland) P&O Ferries
- (Republic of Ireland) Stena Line

=== Italy ===
- (Italy) Grandi Navi Veloci
- (Italy) Grimaldi Lines
- (Italy) Corsica Ferries
- (Italy) Moby Lines
- (Italy) Tirrenia di Navigazione

=== Japan ===
- (Japan) Taiheiyō Ferry
- (Japan) Shin Nihonkai Ferry
- (Japan) Orange Ferry
- (Japan) MOL Sunflower

=== Mexico ===
- (Mexico) Baja Ferries

=== Norway ===
- (Norway) Color Line
- (Norway) Fjord Line

=== Poland ===
- (Poland) Polferries

=== Spain ===
- (Spain) Trasmediterranea
- (Spain) Baleària

=== Sweden ===
- (Sweden) Stena Line

Tunisia

- Tunisia ferries (COTUNAV)

=== United Kingdom ===
- (United Kingdom) P&O Ferries
- (United Kingdom) NorthLink Ferries
- (United Kingdom) Brittany Ferries
- (United Kingdom) Irish Ferries
- (United Kingdom) Stena Line

== Gallery ==
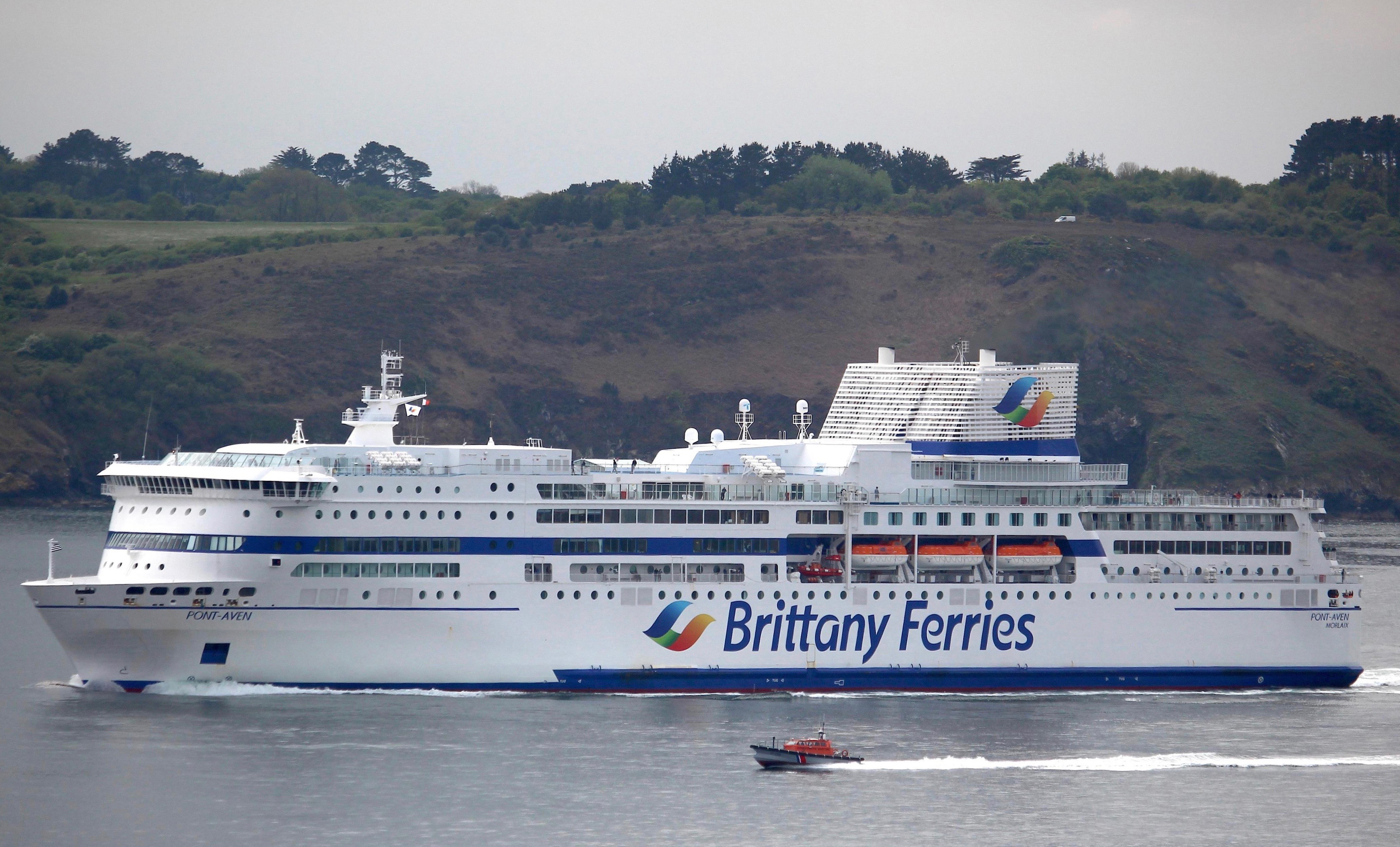
Pont-Aven, Brittany Ferries' flagship.

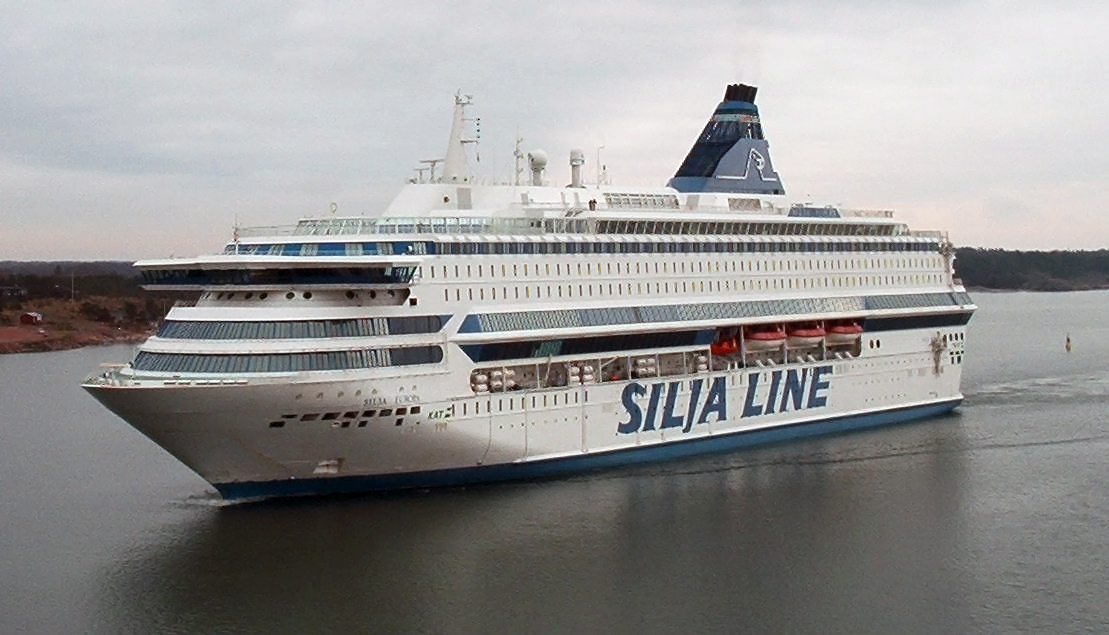
Silja Europa, the largest cruiseferry in the world 1993–2001.

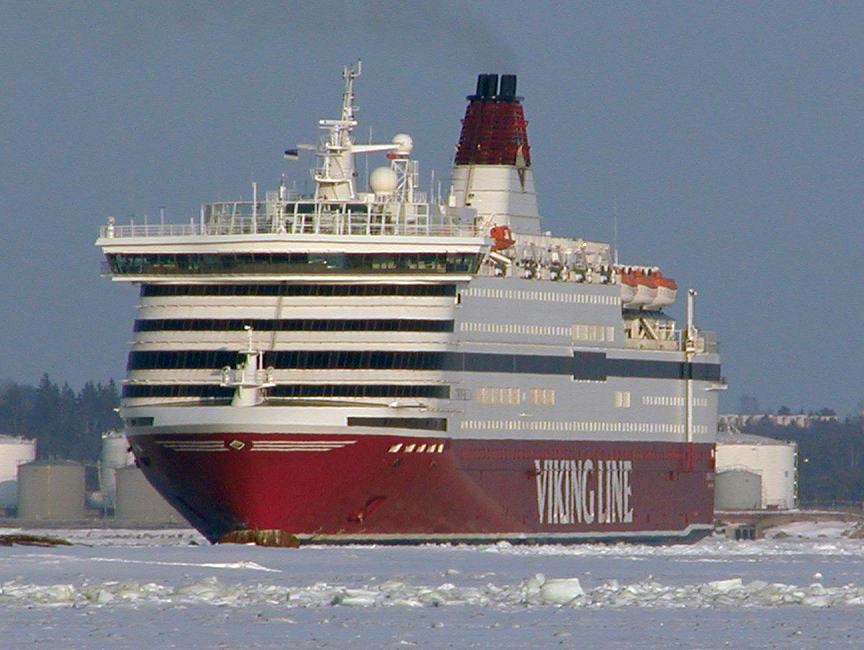
Cinderella departing Helsinki.

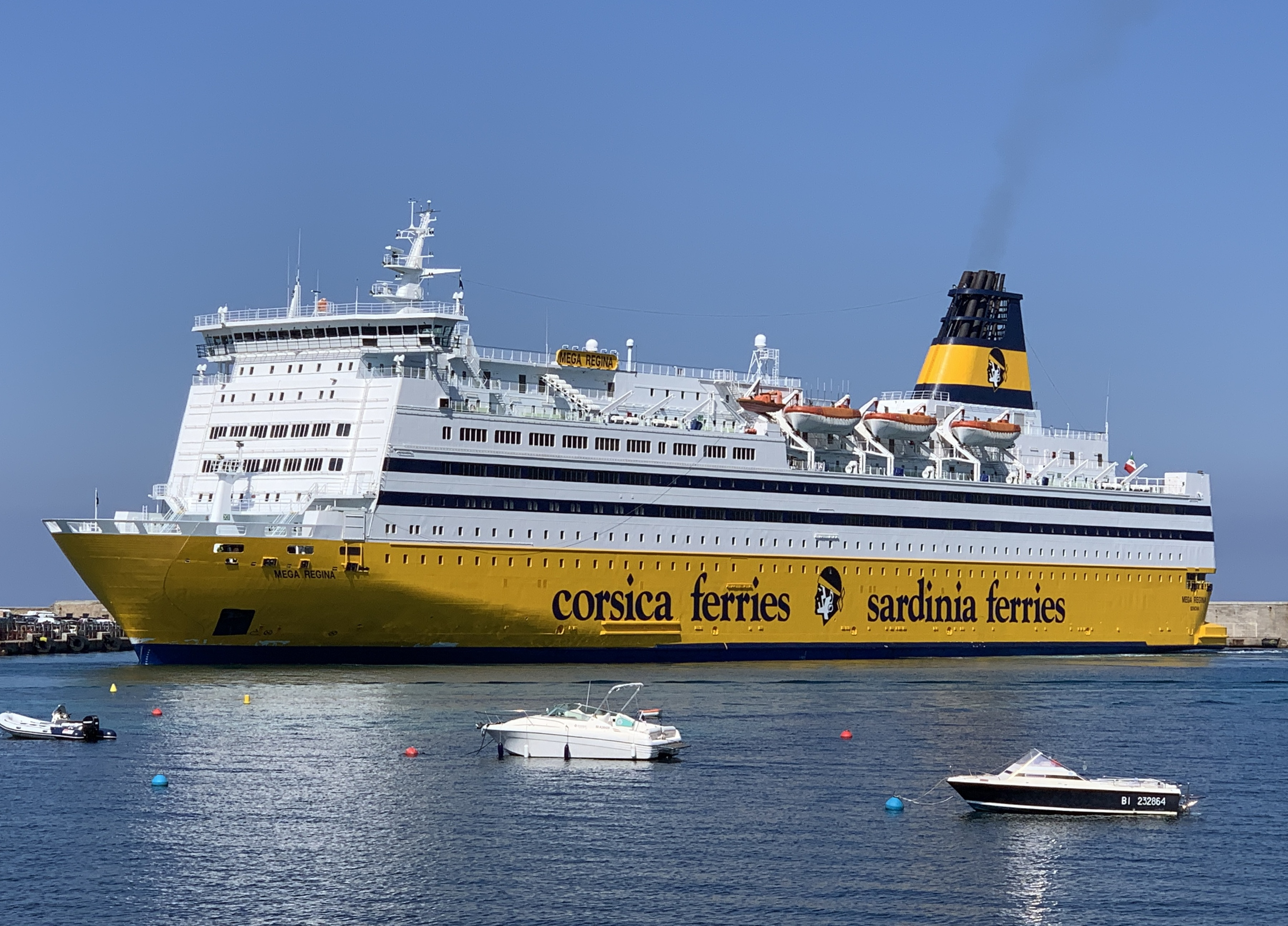
Mega Regina at Ile Rousse

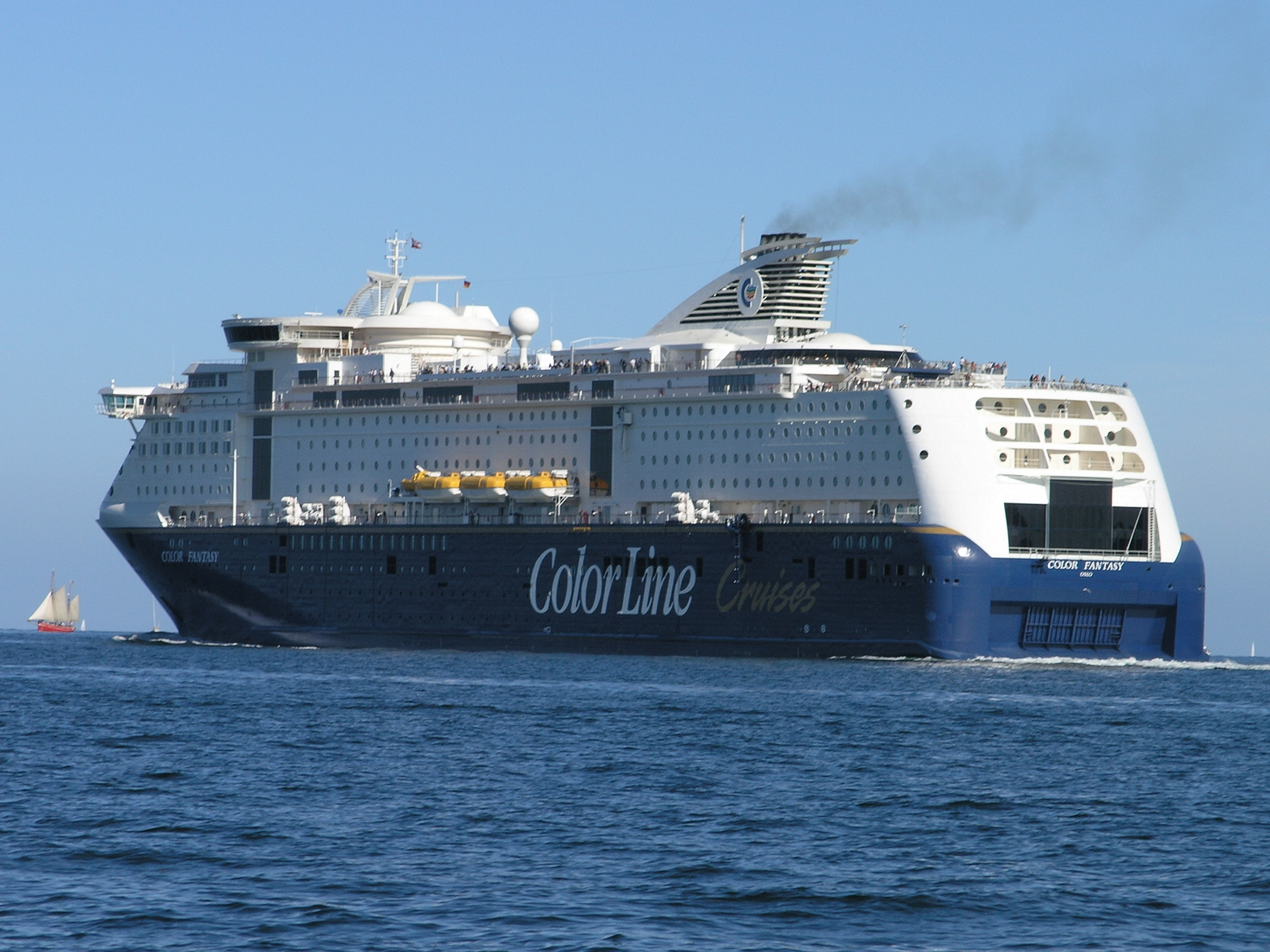
Color Fantasy, the largest cruiseferry in the world 2004–2007.

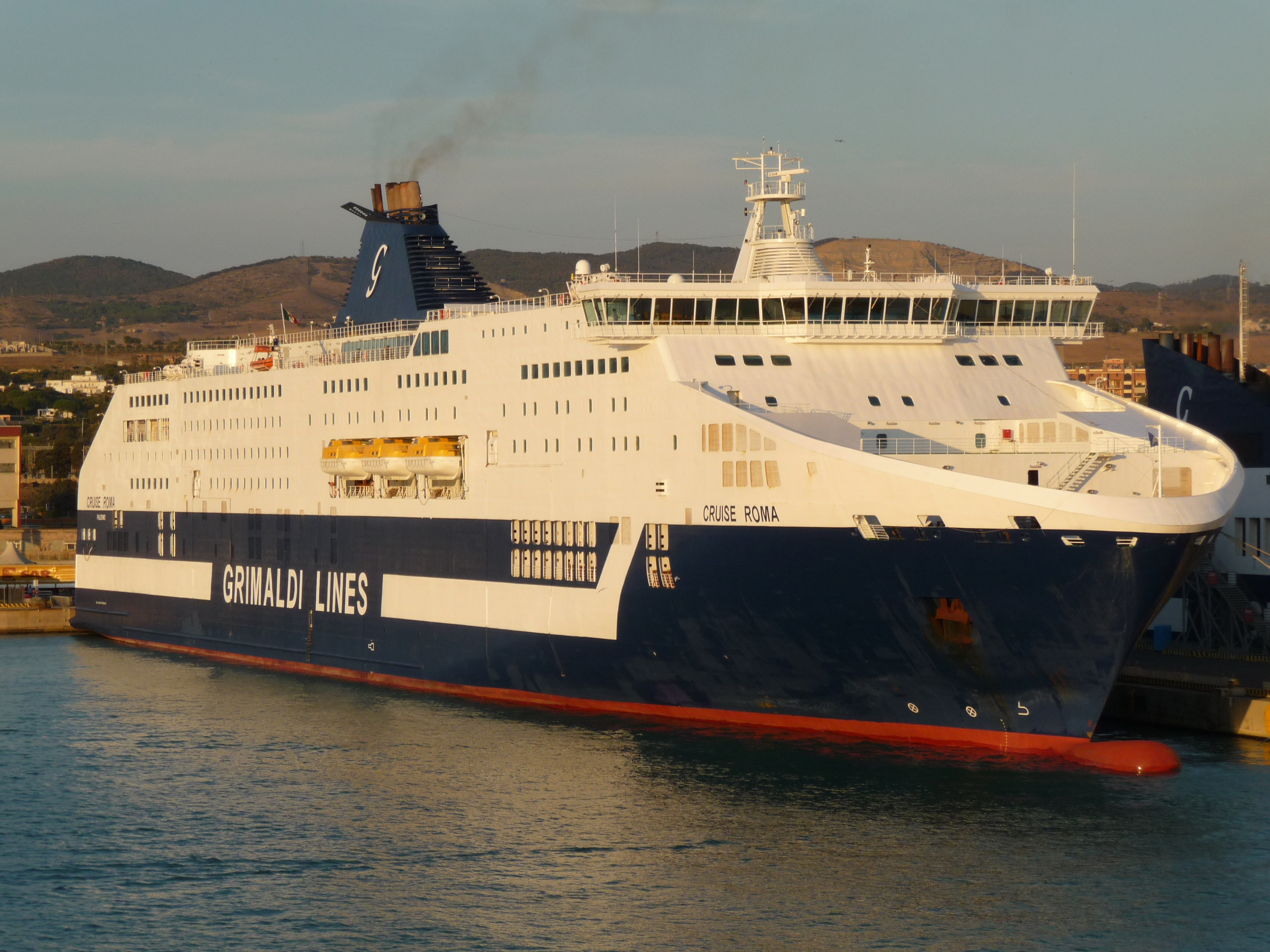
Cruise Roma in Civitavecchia, Italy.

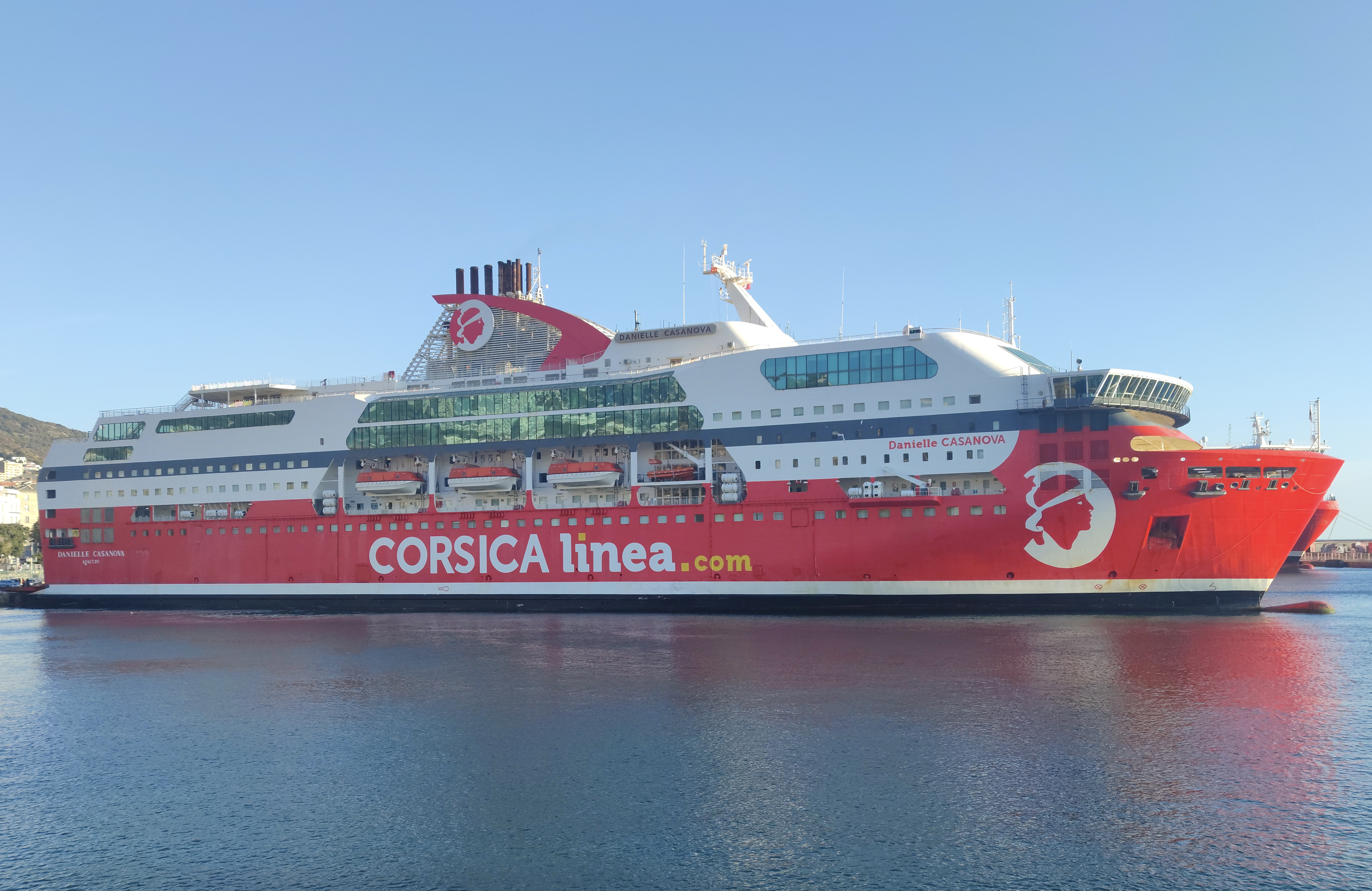
Danielle Casanova in Bastia, Corsica, France.

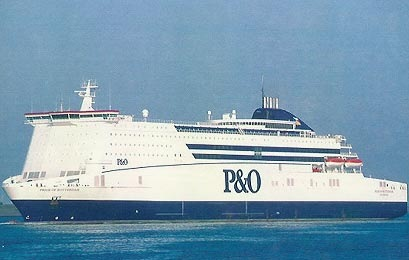
Pride of Rotterdam

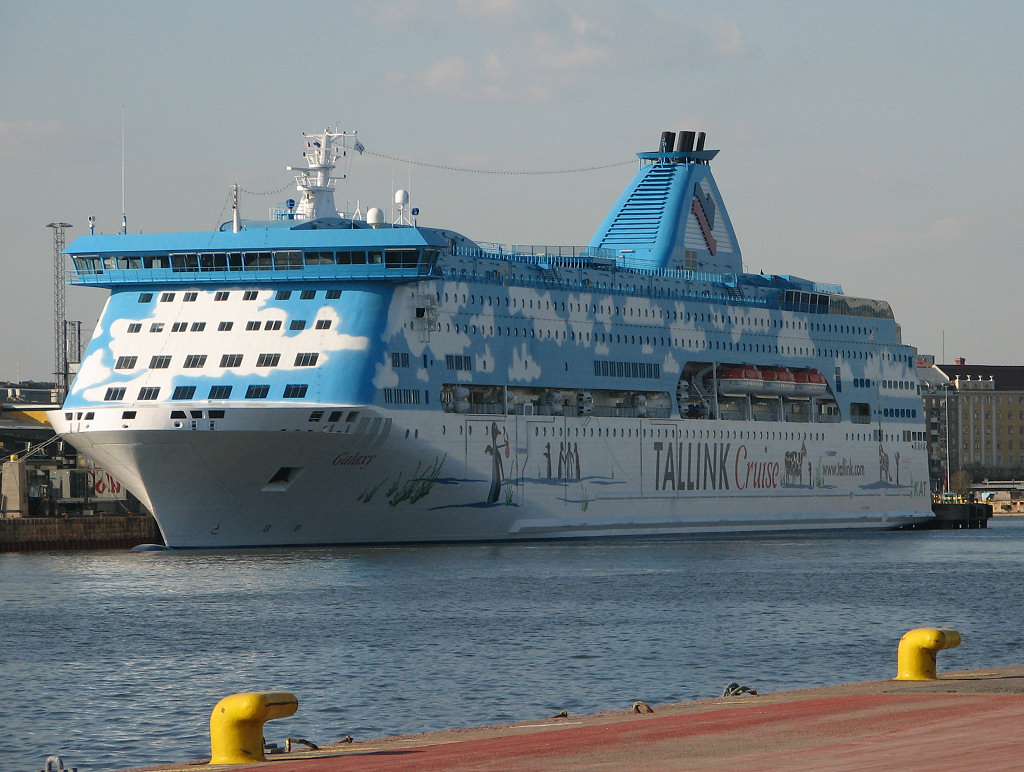
Galaxy in Helsinki West Harbour.

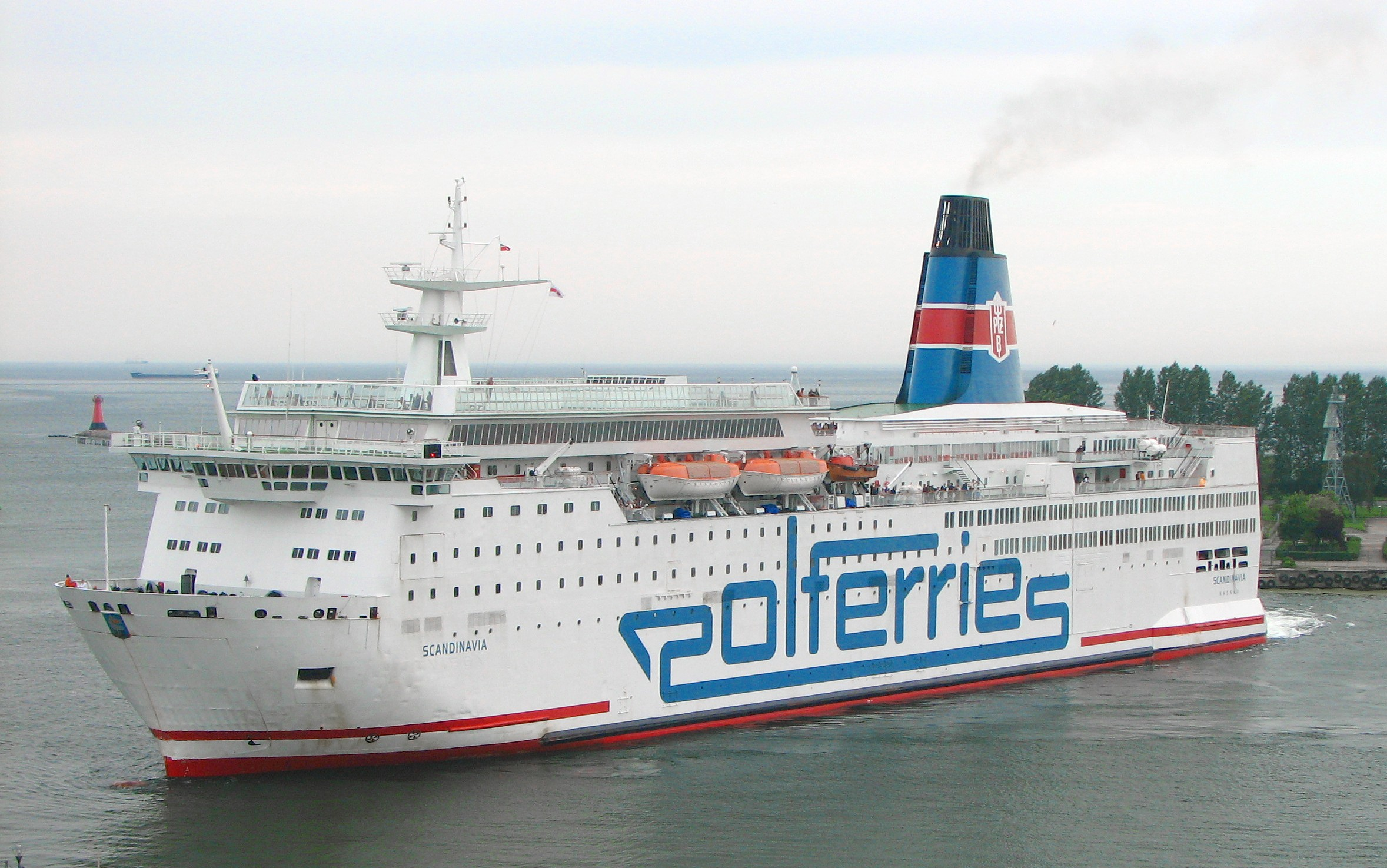
Scandinavia in Gdańsk, Poland.

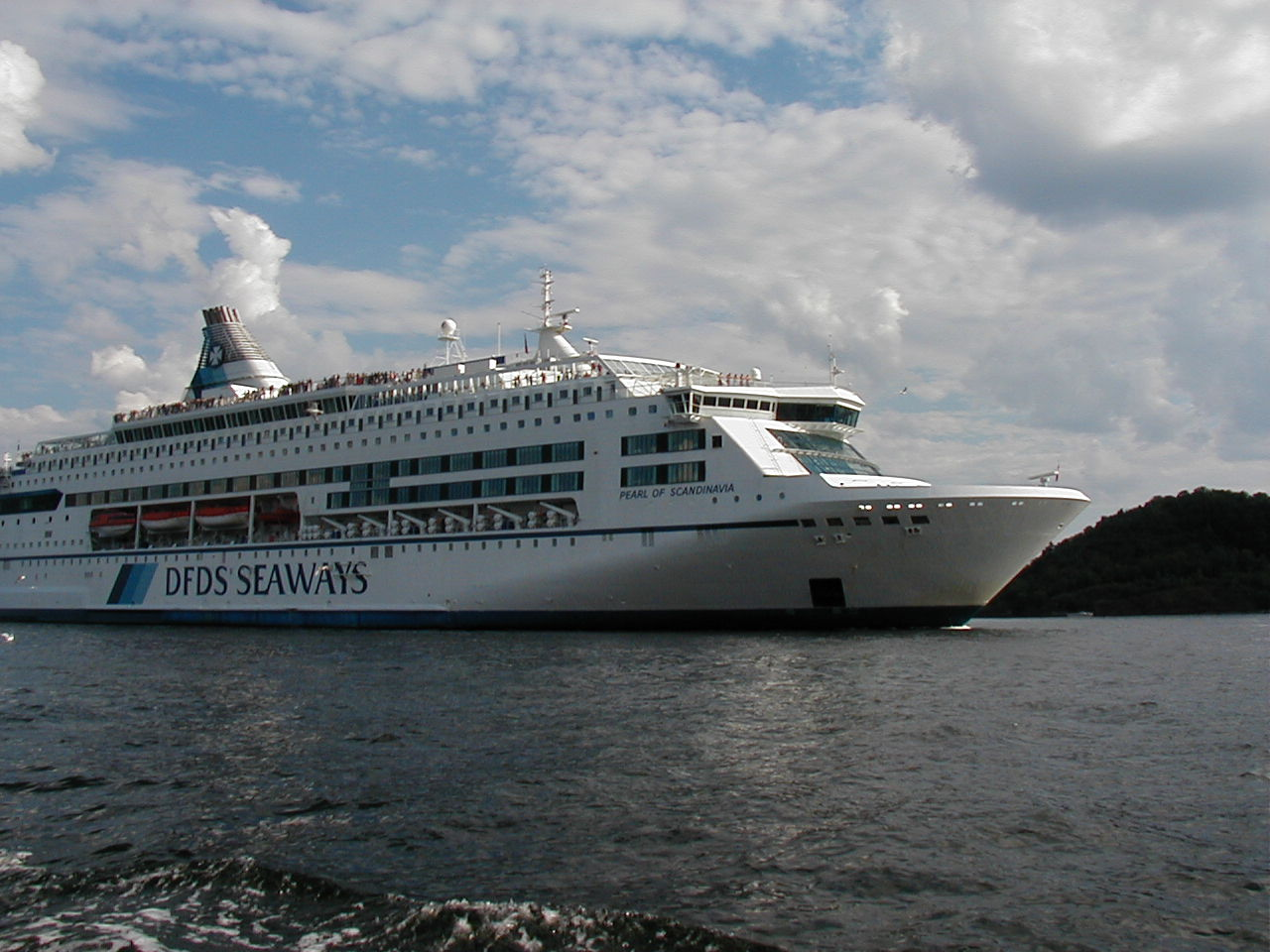
Pearl of Scandinavia in Oslo, Norway

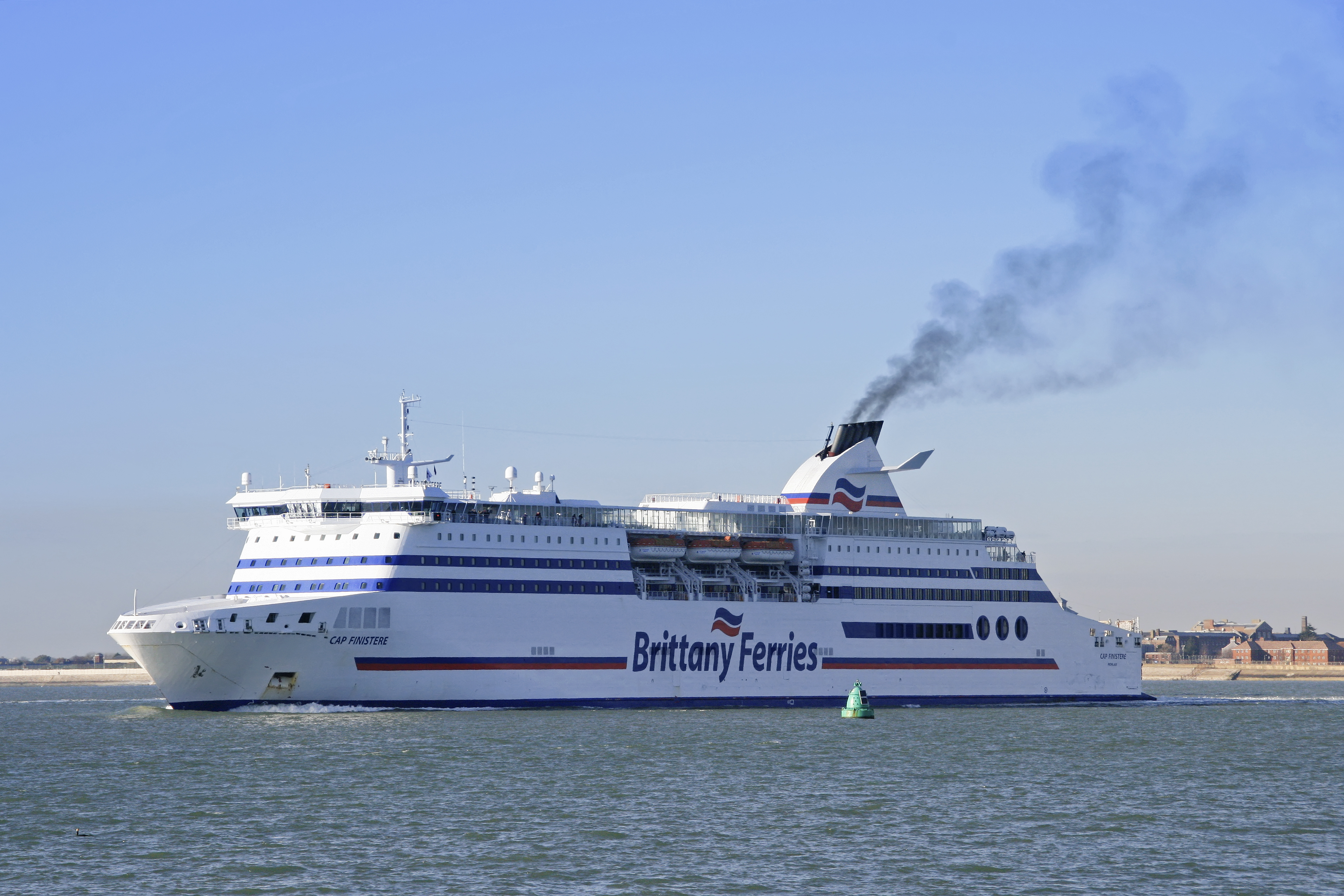
Cap Finistère of Brittany Ferries sailing from Portsmouth International Port, UK for Bilbao, Spain.

== See also ==
- River cruise
