= French ship Calypso =

At least four ships of the French Navy have borne the name Calypso:

- French frigate Calypso (1795), launched in 1782 as the slave ship Baron de Binder in 1793 she became the privateer Duguay-Trouin. She was requisitioned in 1794 and rated as a corvette being renamed Calypso in 1795. Returned to her owners in 1797 and captured by the Royal Navy the following year.
- French frigate Calypso (1807), a Gloire-class frigate launched in 1807 and sold in 1814
- French submarine Calypso (1907), a Circé-class submarine launched in 1907 and sunk in 1914
- French submarine Calypso (Q126), a Circé-class submarine launched in 1926 and sunk in 1943

== See also ==
- RV Calypso, a French oceanographic research ship operated by Jacques Cousteau
- Calypso-class spéronare, a French Navy sail transport class
- Calypso (ship)
