= Nordic Pearl =

Cruise ship launched in 1988

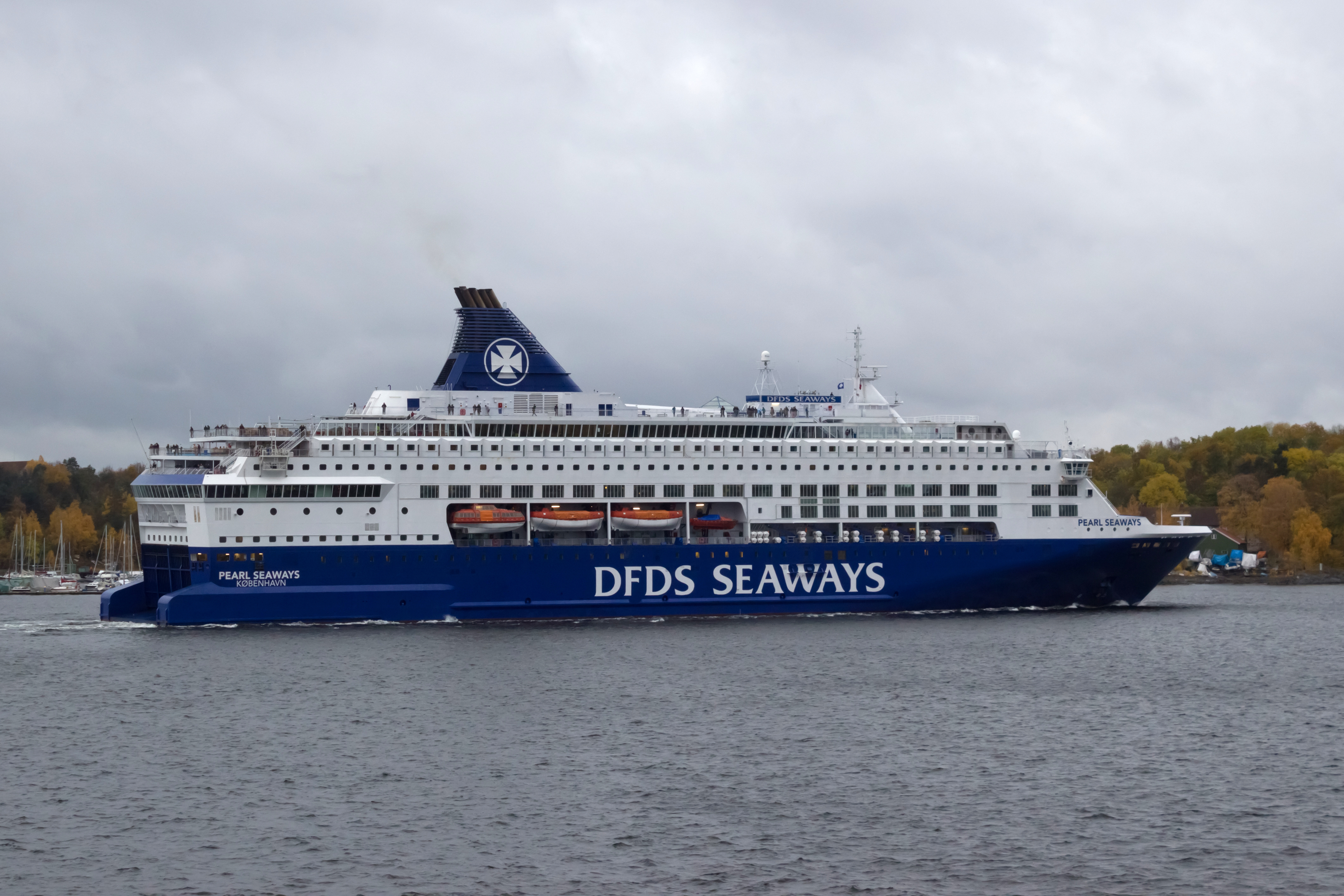
- Pearl Seaways departing Oslo, Norway (2015).

History
- Name: 1989–1993: Athena; 1993: Star Aquarius; 1993–2001: Langkapuri Star Aquarius; 2001: Aquarius; 2001–2011: Pearl of Scandinavia; 2011-2025: Pearl Seaways; 2025-today:Nordic Pearl
- Owner: 1989–1993: Rederi AB Slite; 1993–2001: Star Cruises; 2001-2024: DFDS; 2024 onward: Gotlandsbolaget
- Operator: 1989–1993: Rederi AB Slite (in Viking Line traffic); 1993–2001: Star Cruises; 2001-2024: DFDS Seaways; 2024 onwards: Gotlandsbolaget
- Port of registry: 1989–1993: Slite, Sweden; 1993–2001: Panama City, Panama; 2001 onwards: Copenhagen, Denmark
- Route: Copenhagen–Frederikshavn–Oslo (as of 2020)
- Builder: Wärtsilä Marine Perno shipyard, Turku, Finland
- Yard number: 1297
- Laid down: 27 May 1988
- Launched: 22 October 1988
- Acquired: 18 April 1989
- In service: 24 April 1989
- Identification: IMO number: 8701674
- Status: In service

General characteristics (as Athena)
- Type: Cruiseferry
- Tonnage: 40,012 GT; 2,800 DWT
- Length: 176.60 m (579 ft 5 in)
- Beam: 29.00 m (95 ft 2 in)
- Draught: 6.00 m (19 ft 8 in)
- Ice class: 1 A Super
- Installed power: 4 × Wärtsilä-Sulzer 9ZAL40S; 23,760 kW (31,860 hp) (combined)
- Speed: 21.0 knots (38.9 km/h; 24.2 mph)
- Capacity: 2,200 passengers; 2,394 berths; 450 cars

General characteristics (as Langkapuri Star Aquarius)
- Tonnage: 40,022 GT
- Capacity: 1,378 passengers; 1,378 berths
- Notes: Otherwise the same as above

General characteristics (as Pearl Seaways)
- Tonnage: 40,039 GT
- Length: 178.40 m (585 ft 4 in)
- Beam: 29.61 m (97 ft 2 in)
- Draught: 6.22 m (20 ft 5 in)
- Depth: 16.95 m (55 ft 7 in)
- Speed: 21.2 knots (39.3 km/h; 24.4 mph)
- Capacity: 2,200 passengers; 2,166 berths; 350 cars; 1,008 lanemeters
- Notes: Otherwise the same as above

Nordic Pearl is a cruiseferry owned by Gotlandsbolaget and operated on their Copenhagen–Frederikshavn-Oslo service. She was built in 1989 by Wärtsilä Marine, Turku, for Rederi AB Slite as Athena for use in Viking Line traffic. Between 1993 and 2001, she sailed as Langkapuri Star Aquarius. From 2001 to 2011 she sailed as Pearl of Scandinavia and from 2011 to 2025 she sailed as Pearl Seaways.

Nordic Pearl had a sister ship, Star Pisces.

== History ==
=== Viking Line service ===
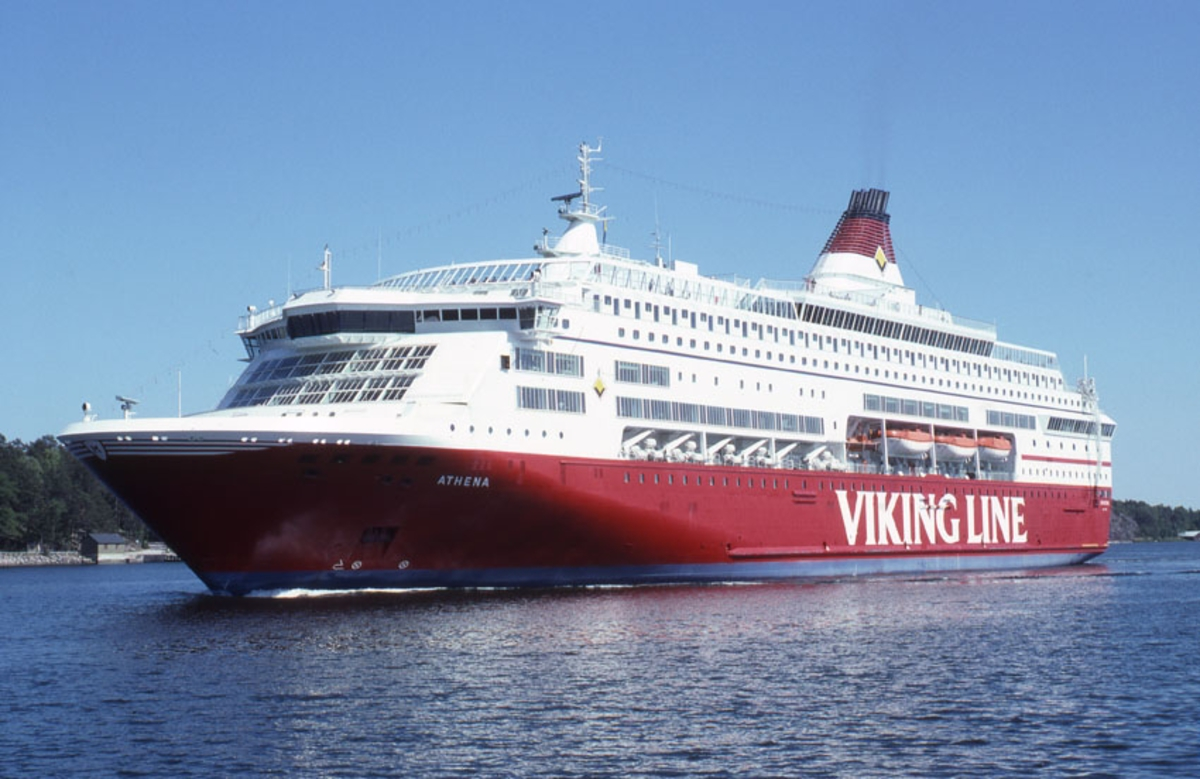
Athena in Saltsjön, Sweden between 1989 and 1993

In the latter half of the 1980s owners of the rival shipping companies Viking Line and Silja Line competed heavily for dominance on routes connecting Finland to Sweden, with 11 new builds delivered between 1985 and 1991. At this time, there was also a strong belief in growing of the cruise passenger market.

In response to challenge from the other Viking Line partner SF Line and Silja's owners, Rederi AB Slite ordered two new builds from Wärtsilä Marine Perno shipyard. The first of these was to be called Athena, and she was planned to replace the MS Diana II on the freight-dominant Naantali–Kapellskär service. The ship was designed by Per Dockson. The authorities of Kapellskär failed to modernise their harbour to accommodate such a large ship, and when delivered in April 1989 the ship (which at the time of delivery was the largest cruiseferry in the world) was set on cruise traffic between Stockholm and Mariehamn, replacing the Apollo III. Additional public spaces, such as an "amusement park" and a disco were built on her cardeck. Part of the cardeck was also used as a parking space for cruise passengers who came to Stockholm with their own cars.

Apart from a fire in one of the cabins in May 1989, the Athena's service with Viking Line proved to be uneventful. In spring 1993, she made a test cruise from Stockholm to Riga. Unfortunately at the same time her owners were experiencing notable financial difficulties and were forced to declare bankruptcy in April 1993. Athena continued serving with Viking Line until August of the same year, when she was laid up in Stockholm awaiting sale. DFDS and P&O Ferries were both interested in her, and it was believed that the latter would be her new owner. In the end Malaysia-based Star Cruises made a bid their competitors couldn't match.

=== Star Cruises service ===
In September 1993 Athena was renamed Star Aquarius, re-flagged into Panama and started her journey from the Baltic to Singapore. Between October and December she was rebuilt in Sembawang dock, Singapore, as a cruise ship. Her interior decorations were changed and her entire cardeck was altered into a huge casino. Her Viking Line-red hull was replaced with a dark blue one and the base of her funnel repainted blue, with a yellow star where Viking's logo had been. This readaptation of Viking Line's funnel colours remains Star Cruises' funnel colour scheme to this day. During the rebuilding her name was again changed, this time into Langkapuri Star Aquarius. The ship was designed by Per Dockson. In 1994 the Langkapuri Star Aquarius begun cruising from Singapore (in practice the ships's name was often displayed as Star Aquarius in promotional material).

In 1998 her port of departure was changed into Hong Kong, and around the same time she received Star Cruises' new white-hulled livery. The former carferry was never a particularly practical cruise ship however, and when Star Cruises started taking delivery of various newbuilds the Langkapuri Star Aquarius was placed for sale. Eventually she was sold to DFDS on 11 January 2001.

=== DFDS service ===
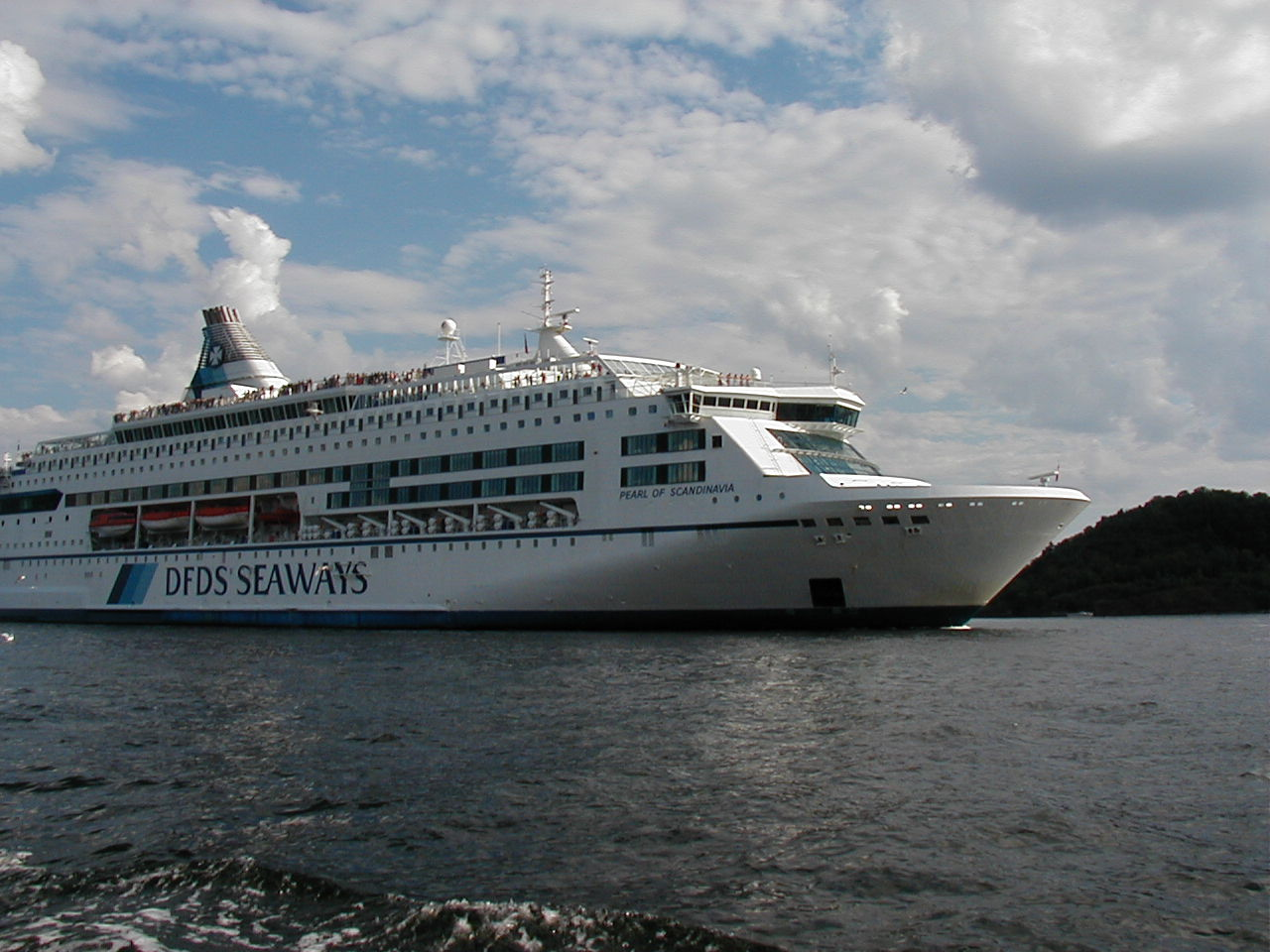
Pearl of Scandinavia in Oslo, Norway in 2002

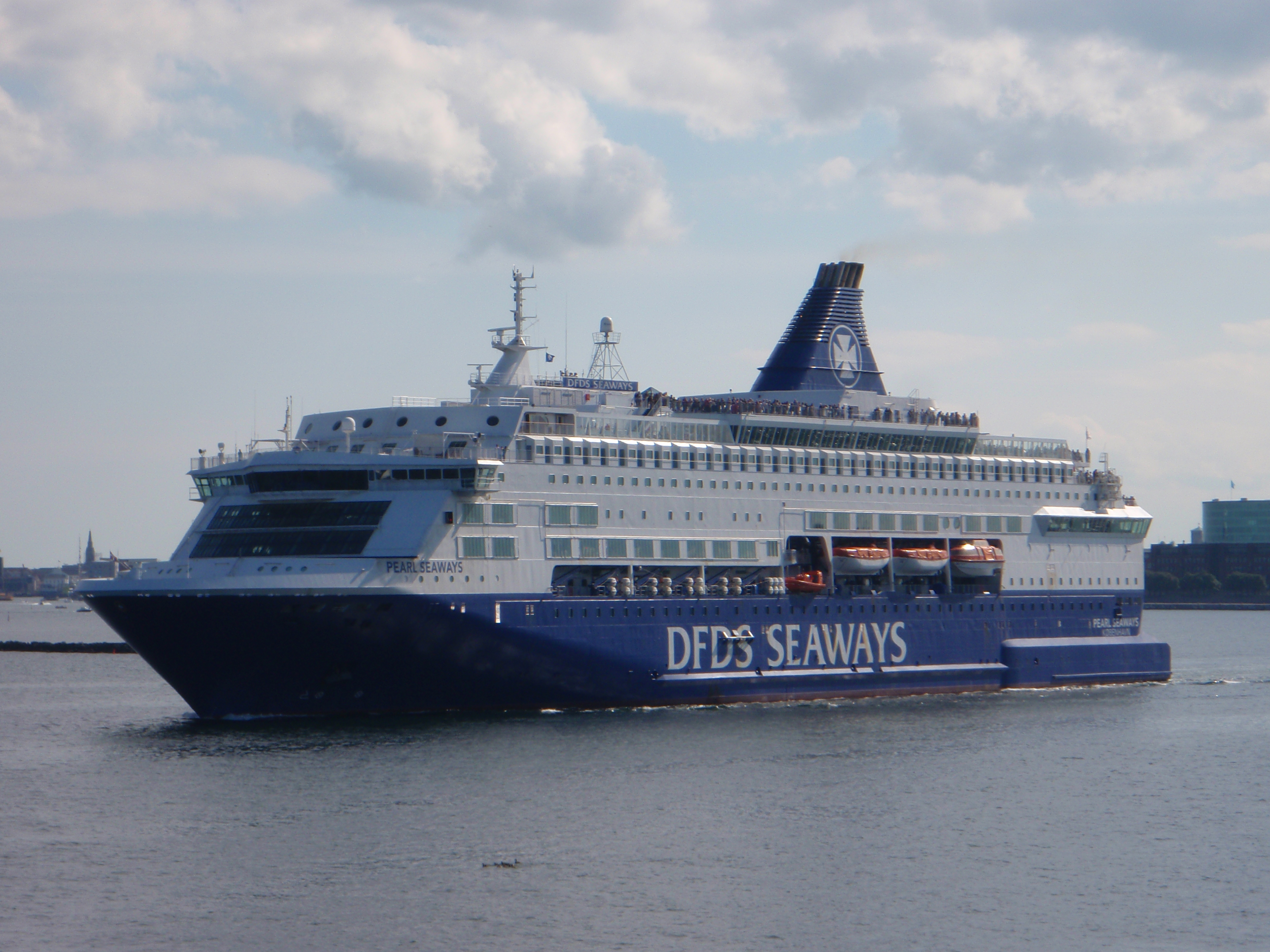
Pearl Seaways in Copenhagen, Denmark in 2014

The ship arrived back in Europe in March 2001 under the temporary name Aquarius. Between April and June of the same year she was rebuilt back into a car-passenger ferry first at Blohm & Voss, Hamburg, and then at Ålborg where most of the alterations to her interior were carried out, any alterations to the vessel that were added by Star Cruises were removed. She received her new name Pearl of Scandinavia while at Hamburg. During the rebuilding rearsponsons were added to the ship for increased stability. Finally on 26 June she started on her first journey between Copenhagen, Helsingborg and Oslo. On 27 December 2001 the ship had a blackout in Oslofjord and was drifting for an hour before power could be re-established.

In January 2002 the ship was again rebuilt, this time at Copenhagen, and again in January 2005 at Öresundsvarvet, Landskrona, Sweden. In October 2006 DFDS decided to drop the stop at Helsingborg in order to save fuel and pilot expenses.

On 17 November 2010, a fire broke out in the car-deck of the ferry while en route from Oslo to Copenhagen. After a re-fit following the fire she was painted in DFDS new livery and renamed Pearl Seaways.

In an unusual tradition for a passenger ship, the Pearl Seaways hosts a traditional Danish Christmas lunch, and is open for homeless people.

In 2016, the ship hosted an e-Navigation conference onboard while in Copenhagen, Denmark, which included a speech by the International Maritime Organization Secretary-General Kitack Lim.

In 2018, an 11kV/2MW shorepower kit was added to Pearl Seaways at Lindø shipyard. After testing, Pearl Seaways started official shorepower operation in Oslo on 1 March 2019, for a potential 2.6 GWh consumption per year.

In the summer of 2020 and after a 46-year break Frederikshavn was introduced as a stop on the route in both directions.

Nordic Pearl in Oslo on December 29, 2025

In June 2024, it was announced that DFDS had sold the route between Copenhagen and Oslo and also the two ships assigned to the route, Pearl Seaways and Crown Seaways, were taken over by the Swedish shipping company, Gotlandsbolaget. The line and the ships will eventually receive new names and significant upgrades.

== See also ==
- Largest ferries of Europe

Preceded by Mariella	World's largest cruiseferry 1989	Succeeded by Cinderella
