= Mega Regina =

Ship of Corsica Ferries - Sardinia Ferries

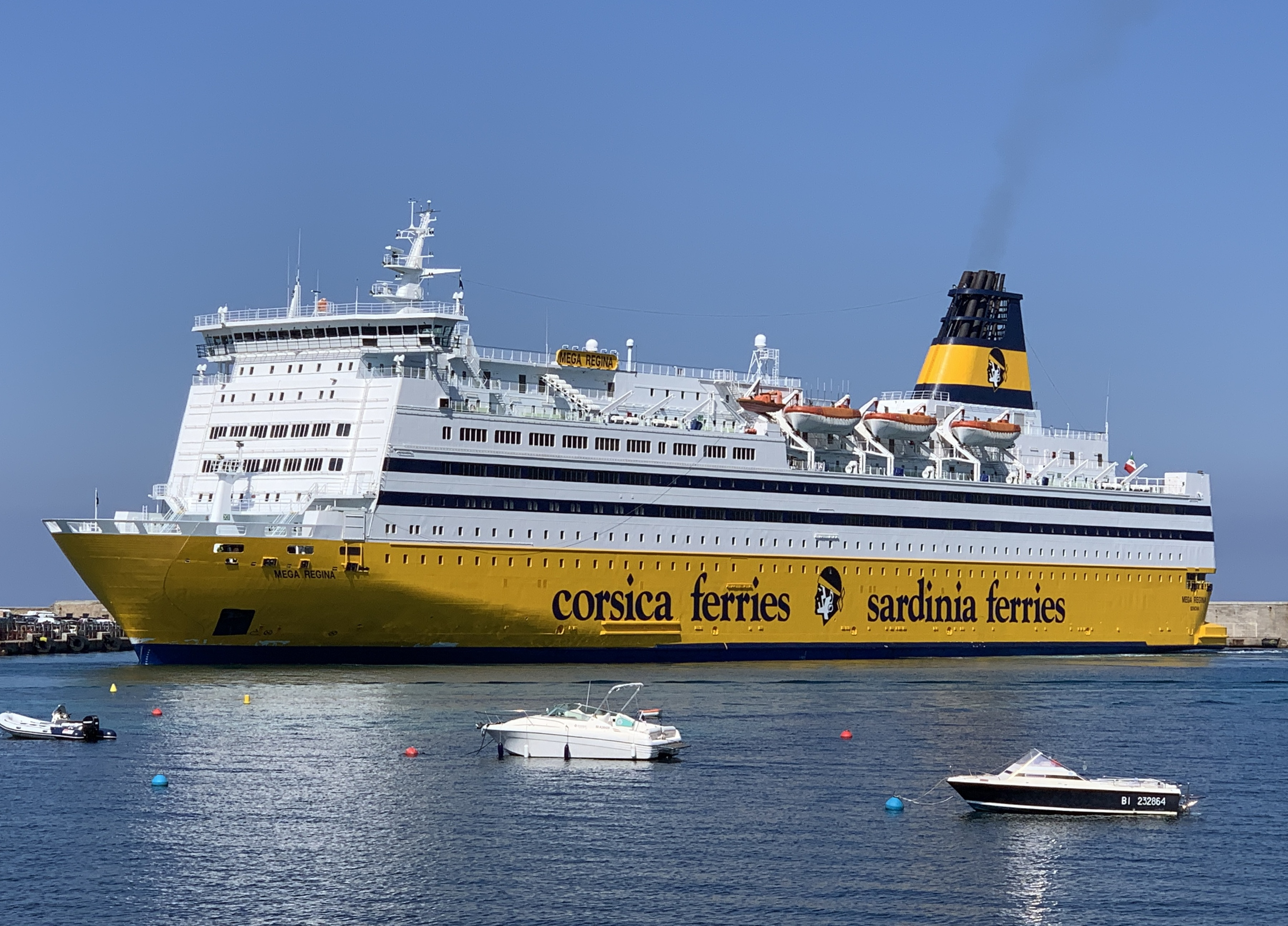
- Mega Regina in Ile Rousse in September 2021

History
- Name: 1985–2021: Mariella; 2021-: Mega Regina
- Owner: 1985–1995: SF Line; 1995–2021: Viking Line; 2021–: Corsica Ferries
- Operator: 1985–1995: SF Line (in Viking Line traffic); 1995–2021: Viking Line; 2021–: Corsica Ferries
- Port of registry: Genoa, Italy
- Route: Toulon, Nice → Bastia, Porto Vecchio, ile Rousse, Livorno → Golfo Aranci
- Builder: Wärtsilä Perno Shipyard, Turku, Finland
- Yard number: 1286
- Launched: 28 September 1984
- Acquired: 17 May 1985
- In service: 18 May 1985
- Identification: Call sign: IBDD; IMO number: 8320573; MMSI number: 247436500
- Status: In service

General characteristics
- Type: Cruiseferry
- Tonnage: 37,799 GT; 3,000 DWT
- Length: 175.70 m (576 ft 5 in)
- Beam: 28.40 m (93 ft 2 in)
- Draught: 6.52 m (21 ft 5 in)
- Depth: 14.65 m (48 ft 1 in)
- Decks: 11
- Ice class: 1 A Super
- Installed power: 4 × Wärtsilä-SEMT Pielstick 12 PC 2.6 V diesels; combined 23,000 kW (31,000 hp)
- Propulsion: 2 propellers
- Speed: 22 knots (40.74 km/h; 25.32 mph)
- Capacity: As built: 2,447 passengers; 2,447 berths; 600 cars; 62 trailers; As of 2009: 2,500 passengers; 2,500 berths; 430 cars; 980 lanemeters

Mega Regina is a cruiseferry owned by Corsica Ferries. She was formerly owned and operated by Viking Line as Mariella. She was built by the Wärtsilä Perno shipyard in Turku, Finland and delivered to SF Line in 1985. Her sister ship is the Olympia (now Moby Orli). Mariella was the world's largest cruiseferry from 1985 until 1989, when the accolade passed on to her Viking Line fleetmate Athena. Mariella was sold to Corsica Ferries in 2021 and renamed Mega Regina. The ship started traffic on the Mediterranean Sea in summer 2021.

== History ==
When the Mariella was delivered in 1985, she was the first ship on Viking Line's Helsinki–Stockholm service which was not owned by Rederi Ab Sally. She has remained on the same route ever since, except for a few brief times when she has been moved temporarily on to other Viking Line routes. This makes her the record holder for the longest continual service on the Helsinki–Stockholm route. At the time of her delivery, the Mariella was the largest ferry in the world in terms of gross tonnage, number of passengers and passenger berths.

In 1989, ahead of the delivery of the new Cinderella, SF Line considered moving Mariella on to a proposed express Helsinki–Norrköping service aimed at passengers travelling with their cars. The plan never materialised, and Mariella continued to serve on the same route even after the Cinderella was delivered and placed as the third ship on the route. Following the bankruptcy of Rederi AB Slite in 1993, SF Line was left as the sole operator of the Viking Line name, but this had no effect on Mariella's traffic.

Mariella was the first ship to arrive at the scene of perished Estonia in September 1994. Fifteen survivors were picked up from the sea and another eleven were brought on board by helicopters, as Mariella was used as the main helicopter platform.

During the 1996 summer season a short cruise from Helsinki to Tallinn was added to Mariella's schedule in place of the nine hours she normally spent in Helsinki. These "picnic cruises" proved to be unpopular and they were not continued the following summer. When the EU ended tax free sales on routes between member states in July 1999, Viking Line added a stop at Mariehamn, Åland to the Helsinki–Stockholm route. As Åland is not a part of the EU tax union, Viking Line could continue tax-free sales on its ships.

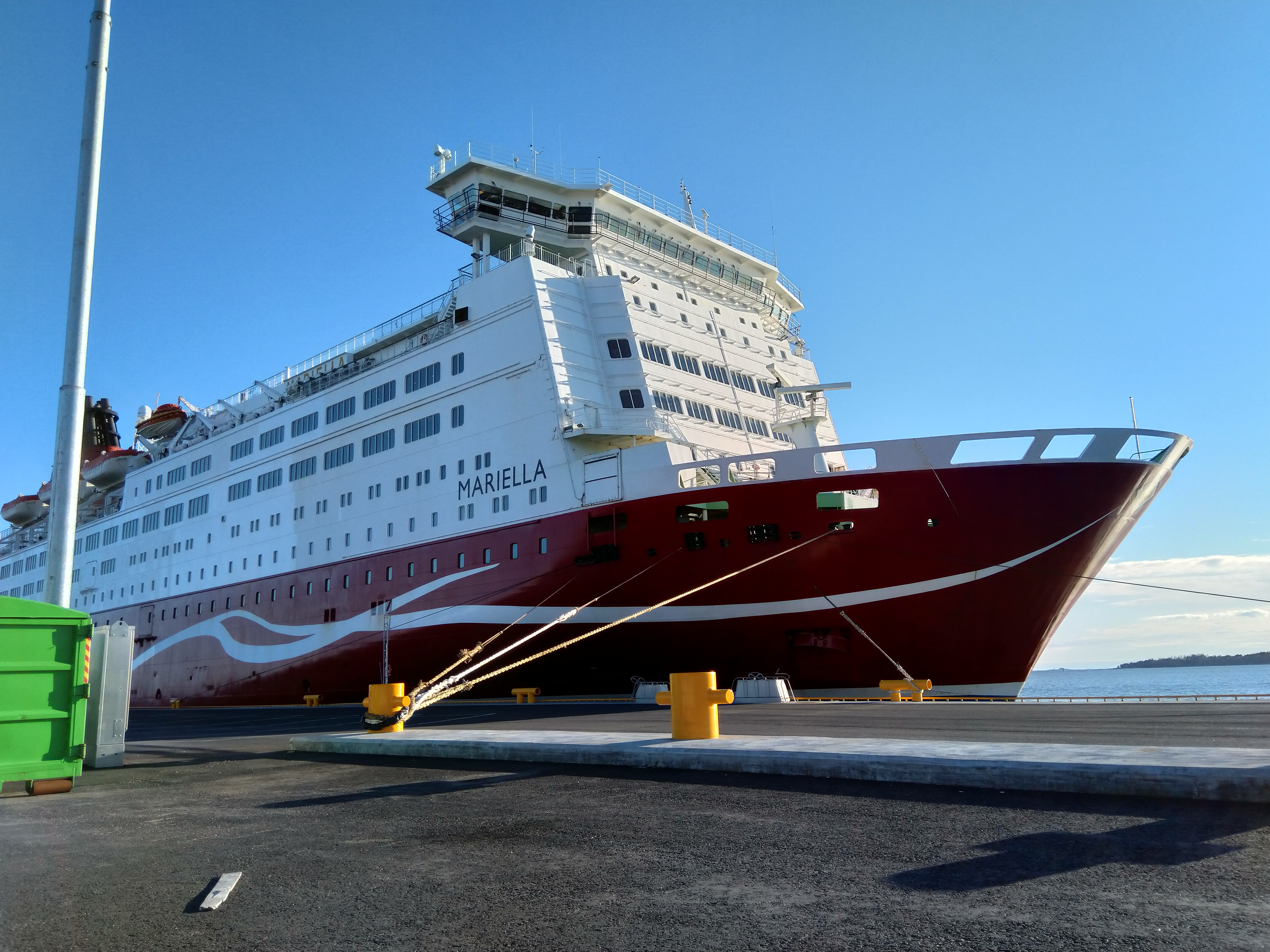
Mariella in Hernesaari in 2020

In September 2000 Mariella was refitted at Naantali with rear sponsons and a new fast rescue boat. Her interior was also brought up to date and for some time after the refit she sported the text "Updated 06/10 2000" on her hull. Another refit was carried out in September 2006 once again at Naantali.

In mid-2020, as a result of the COVID-19 pandemic, the Helsinki-Stockholm route was put on hold. The company released a statement in August, putting Mariella up for sale. There was no intention of actually selling her but stated that interesting bids could be accepted.

In May 2021, Viking Line announced that the ship had been sold to Corsica Ferries. Mariella was sold for a price of 19.6 million euros. Corsica Ferries started using the ship in late June 2021. Her new name is Mega Regina.

== Decks ==
This list covers the ship's decks as Mariella.

Deck 11
Bridge and sun deck.

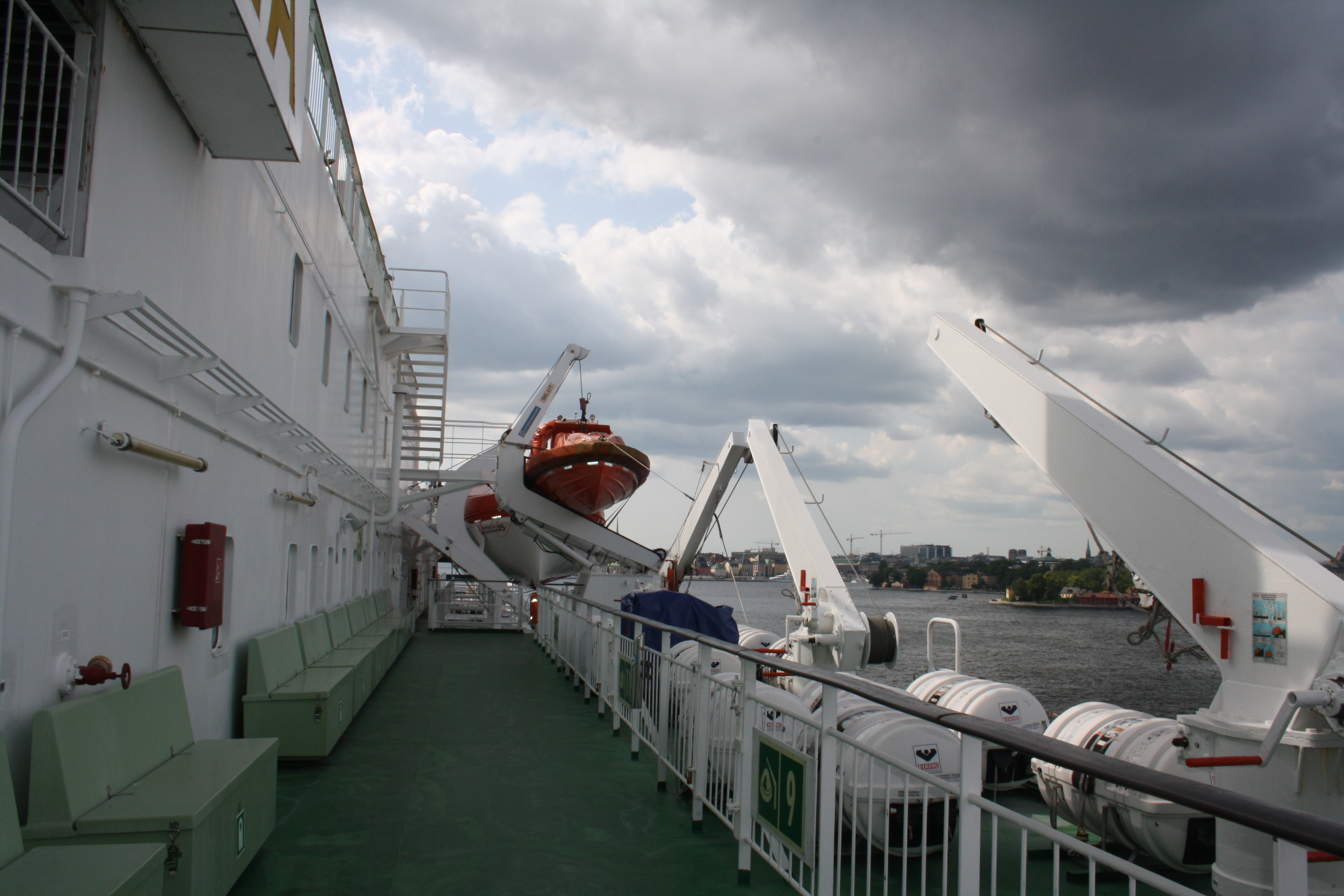
Life boats on an outer deck

Deck 10
Captain's Deck - Lifeboats, MOB boats, inflatable vests, muster stations, crew quarters and sun deck.
Deck 9
Compass Deck - Crew quarters.
Deck 8
Conference Deck - Conference facilities, sun deck and crew cabins.

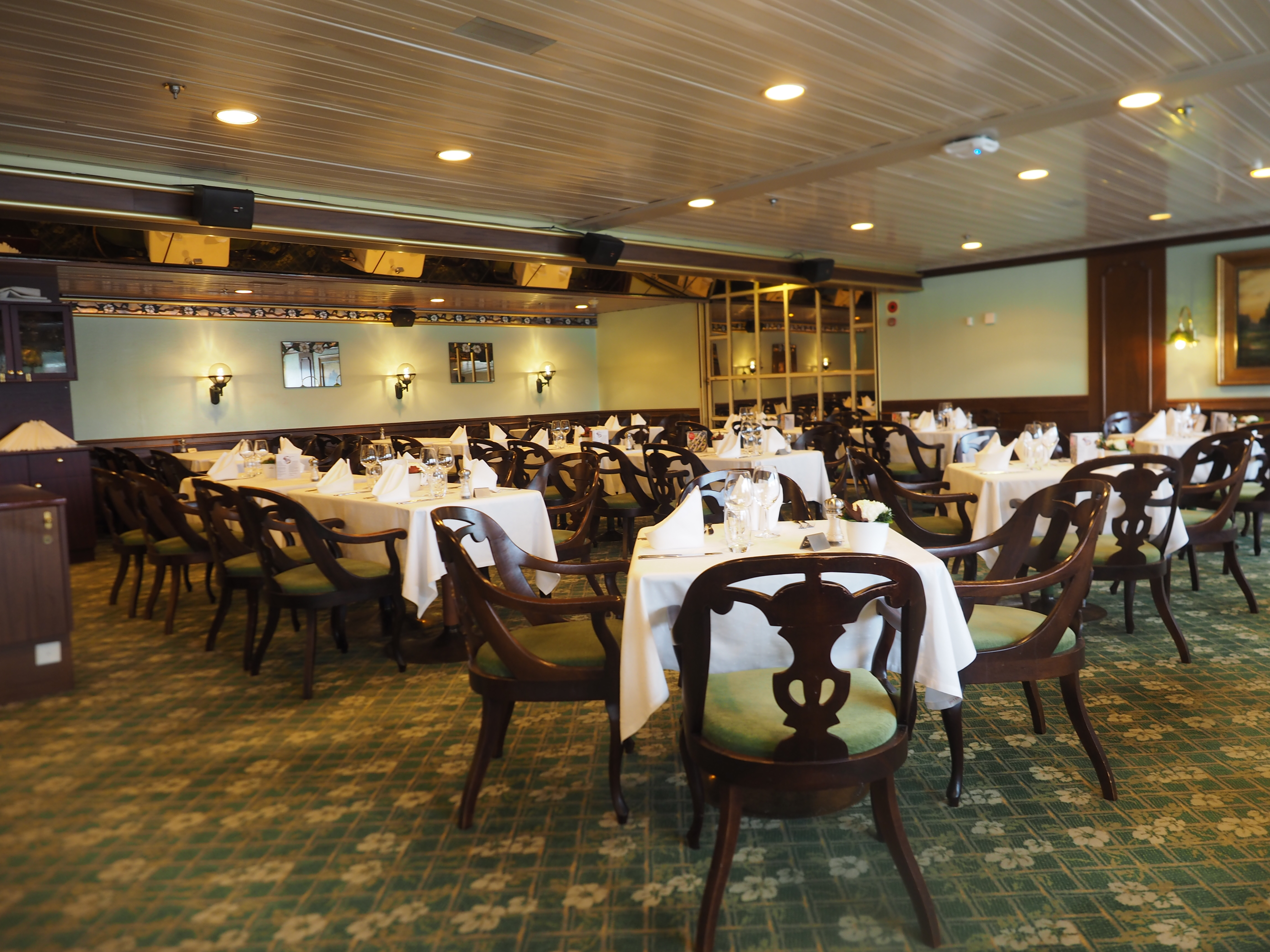
Interior of a restaurant

Deck 7
Restaurant Deck - Restaurants Viking Buffet, Food Garden, Plate and Ocean Grill, bars Musicmeister and Casino Bar and night club Club Mar.
Deck 6
Info & Shopping Deck - Cabins of classes Suite, LXB, A4, B2D, B4, B4T and B2P, duty free shop, café Coffee & Joy, gaming room, information desk, Travel Spa, embarkation and disembarkation.
Deck 5
Sextant Deck - Cabins of classes LXB, LXR, A2L, AD2, A4, B2D, B4 and B2P.

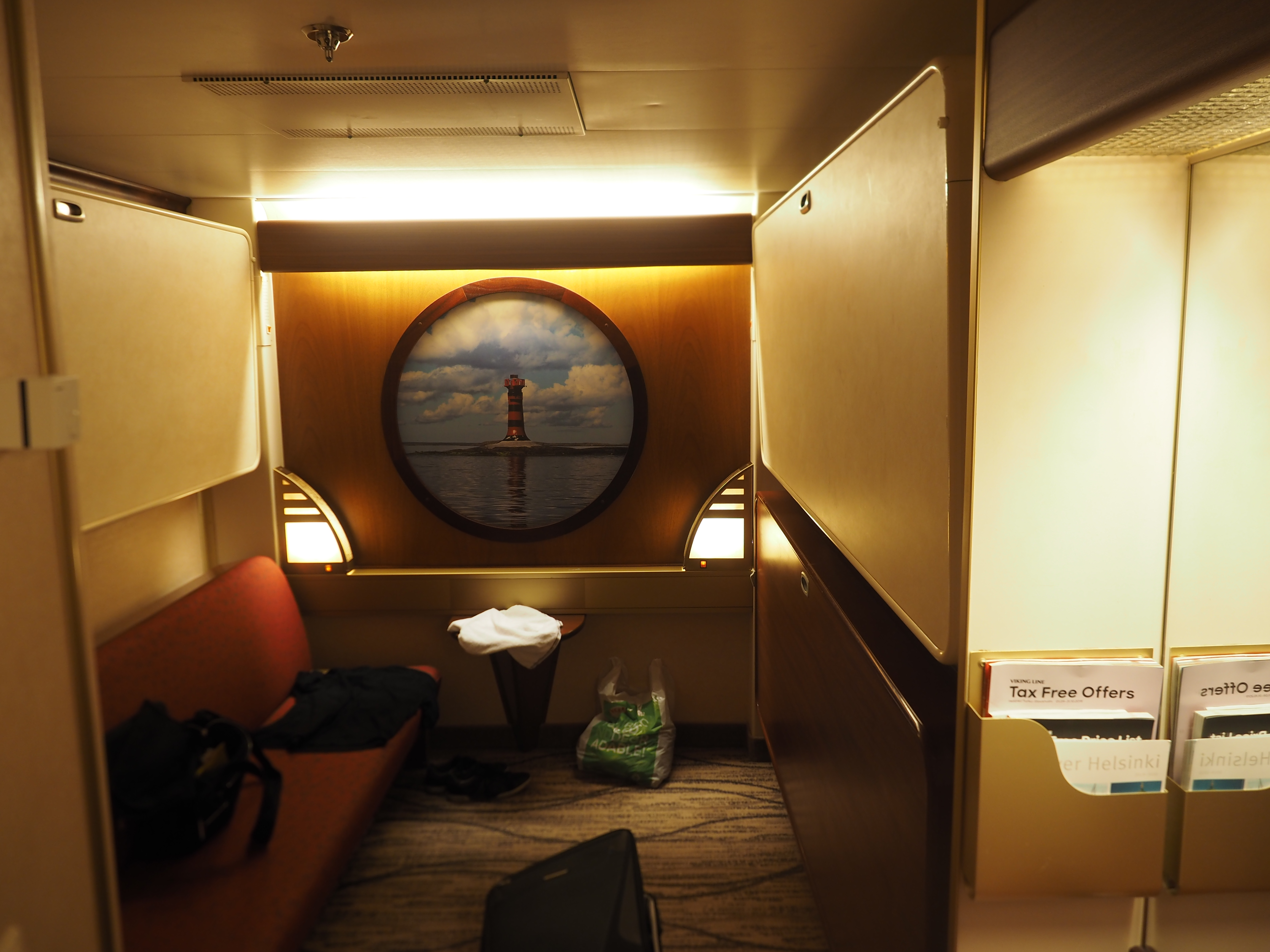
Interior of an inside cabin for four passengers

Deck 4
Bell Deck - Cabins of classes A4, A4R, HA2, B4, B4R and B2P, embarkation and disembarkation.
Deck 3C
Car Platform Deck - Car deck (deck for personal cars only, can be lifted up).
Deck 3
Car Deck - Car deck (for all cars).
Deck 2
Anchor Deck - Cabins of classes C4 and Q3, sauna and swimming pool. Upper levels of machinery rooms, machinery surveillance.
Deck 1
Primary and secondary machinery rooms, boiler room and other technical facilities.

| Preceded by Svea | World's Largest Cruiseferry; 1985–1989 | Succeeded by Athena |
