= Star Pisces =

Cruise ship owned by Star Cruises

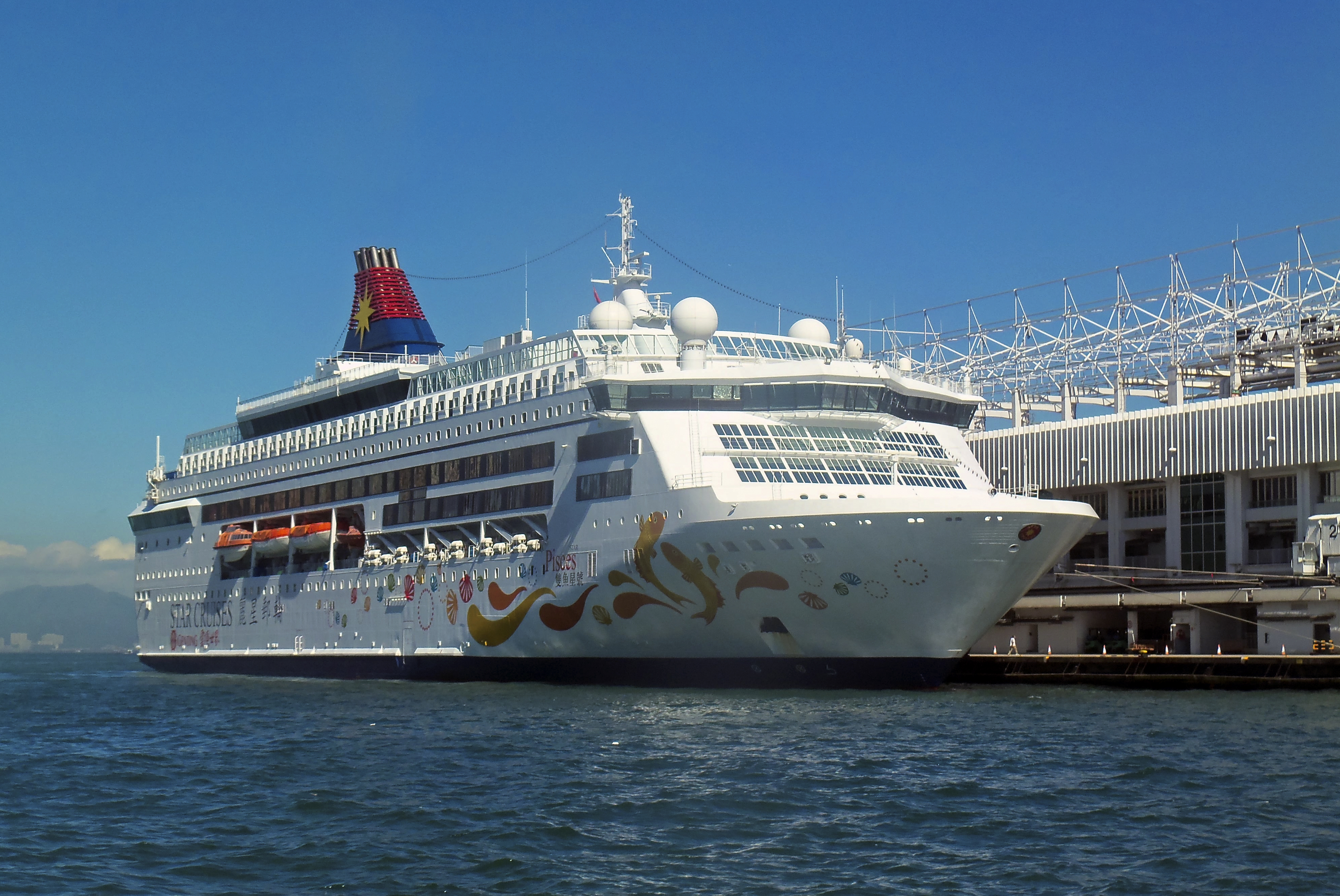
- Star Pisces at Ocean Terminal, Hong Kong in 2013

History
- Name: 1990–1993: Kalypso; 1993–2022: Star Pisces; 2022–2022: Pisc
- Owner: 1990–1994: Rederi AB Slite; 1994–2022: Star Cruises
- Operator: 1990–1994: Rederi AB Slite (in Viking Line traffic); 1994–2022: Star Cruises
- Port of registry: 1990–1994: Slite, Sweden; 1994–2014: Panama City, Panama; 2014–2022: Nassau, Bahamas
- Builder: Masa-Yards Turku New Shipyard, Finland
- Cost: SEK 650 million
- Yard number: 1298
- Launched: 27 August 1989
- Acquired: 26 April 1990
- Maiden voyage: 30 April 1990
- In service: 30 April 1990
- Out of service: 2022
- Identification: IMO number: 8710857
- Fate: Scrapped in Alang, India in 2022

General characteristics (as Kalypso)
- Type: Cruiseferry
- Tonnage: 40,012 GT; 2,800 DWT
- Length: 176.60 m (579 ft 5 in)
- Beam: 29.61 m (97 ft 2 in)
- Draught: 6.20 m (20 ft 4 in)
- Decks: 12
- Installed power: 4 × Wärtsilä-Sulzer 9ZAL40S; 17,811 kW (23,885 hp)
- Propulsion: 2 propellers
- Speed: 21.0 knots (38.9 km/h; 24.2 mph)
- Capacity: 2,200 passengers; 1,950 berths; 490 cars

General characteristics (as Star Pisces)
- Type: Cruise ship
- Tonnage: 40,053 GT
- Ice class: 1 A Super
- Speed: 21.2 knots (39.3 km/h; 24.4 mph)
- Capacity: 1,900 passengers
- Crew: 750
- Notes: Otherwise the same as built

Star Pisces was a cruise ship owned by Star Cruises. She made short cruises from Hong Kong between 1994 and 2022. Originally, she was completed as the cruiseferry Kalypso in 1990 at Masa-Yards' Turku New Shipyard, Finland, for Rederi AB Slite to run on Viking Line's Finland–Sweden route. After Slite's bankruptcy in 1993, the ship was sold to Star Cruises. She was sold for demolition in 2022.

== History ==
=== Viking Line ===
The late 1980s were a time of hectic new building in Baltic Sea ferry services. Between 1985 and 1991 no less than 11 new ships debuted for competing companies Viking Line and Silja Line. In 1988, Rederi AB Slite ordered the second of two sistership ferries, designed by Per Dockson, for Viking Line service from Wärtsilä Marine. The first, Athena, was delivered in April 1989. The shipbuilding company was declared bankrupt in October 1989, during construction of Kalypso. A new company, Masa-Yards, was established to continue operating Wärtsilä's shipyards in Turku and Helsinki. As a result of the bankruptcy, the Kalypso's final price was much greater than originally agreed.

When delivered on April 30, 1990, the Kalypso entered traffic on the route connecting Turku to Mariehamn and Stockholm, where she sailed without incident for the next three years. 1993 was to be the year when Slite would take delivery of another newbuild, the largest ferry in the world, Europa. However, the Swedish krona was devalued shortly before Slite were due to take delivery of the new ship. Europa ended up in rival Silja Line's fleet in March 1993, and in April Rederi AB Slite was declared bankrupt.

As a result of Slite's bankruptcy, Kalypso and her sister were sold at an auction in August 1993. Bids were made by SF Line (the remaining Viking Line operator), P&O Ferries and DFDS, but the final buyer emerged from Malaysia where the newly established Star Cruises bought both ships. The Kalypso, the last ship ever delivered to Rederi AB Slite, remained in Viking Line service until January 1994.

=== Star Cruises ===
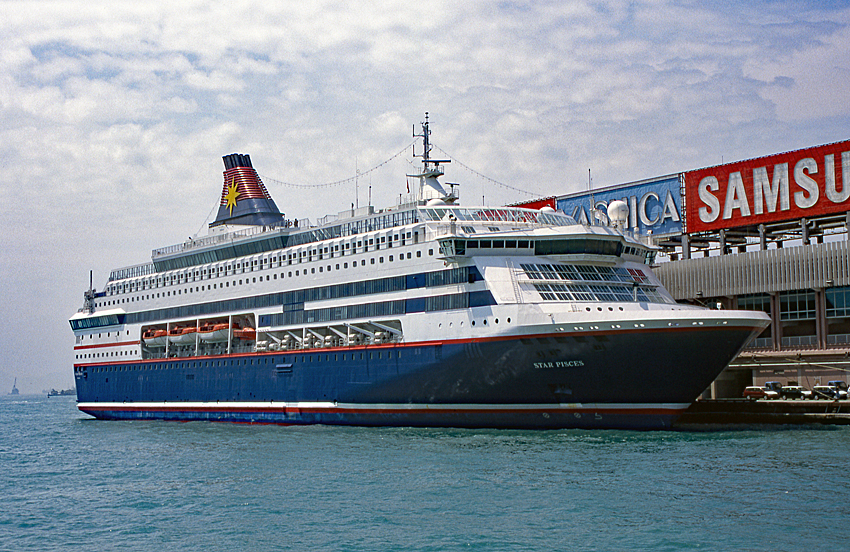
Star Pisces at the Ocean Terminal, Hong Kong in 1996

After the end of her service for Viking Line, the Kalypso sailed to Naantali, Finland where she was docked and renamed Star Pisces. Later in the same month she sailed to Finnyards, Rauma, Finland, where she was rebuilt as a cruise ship. In April 1994 the ship began operating casino cruises from Singapore. Originally the ship sported a dark blue hull with a narrow red band on top, which was later changed into all-white, matching the livery of other Star Cruises' ships. She was later moved to a programme of day and night cruises from Hong Kong. In May 2009 the ship suspended her sailings from Hong Kong where she was laid up, later being moved to Port Klang for further lay up.

In February 2010, Star Pisces was reactivated for cruising out of Penang. She finished her deployment in Penang by the end of December 2010 and was refurbished in Singapore in January 2011. Star Pisces also received hull art, being the first ship to feature hull art in the Star Cruises fleet. She returned to Hong Kong to offer daily high sea cruises in late February 2011.

Star Pisces entered drydock for major renovation in February 2013.

In April 2022 Star Pisces, along with SuperStar Aquarius and SuperStar Gemini, was sold for demolition, following the collapse of Star Cruises' parent company, Genting Hong Kong. Star Pisces was sold to a scrapyard in Alang, India. She was beached on 12 July 2022 under the name Pisc.
