= Silja Europa =

Cruiseferry built in 1993

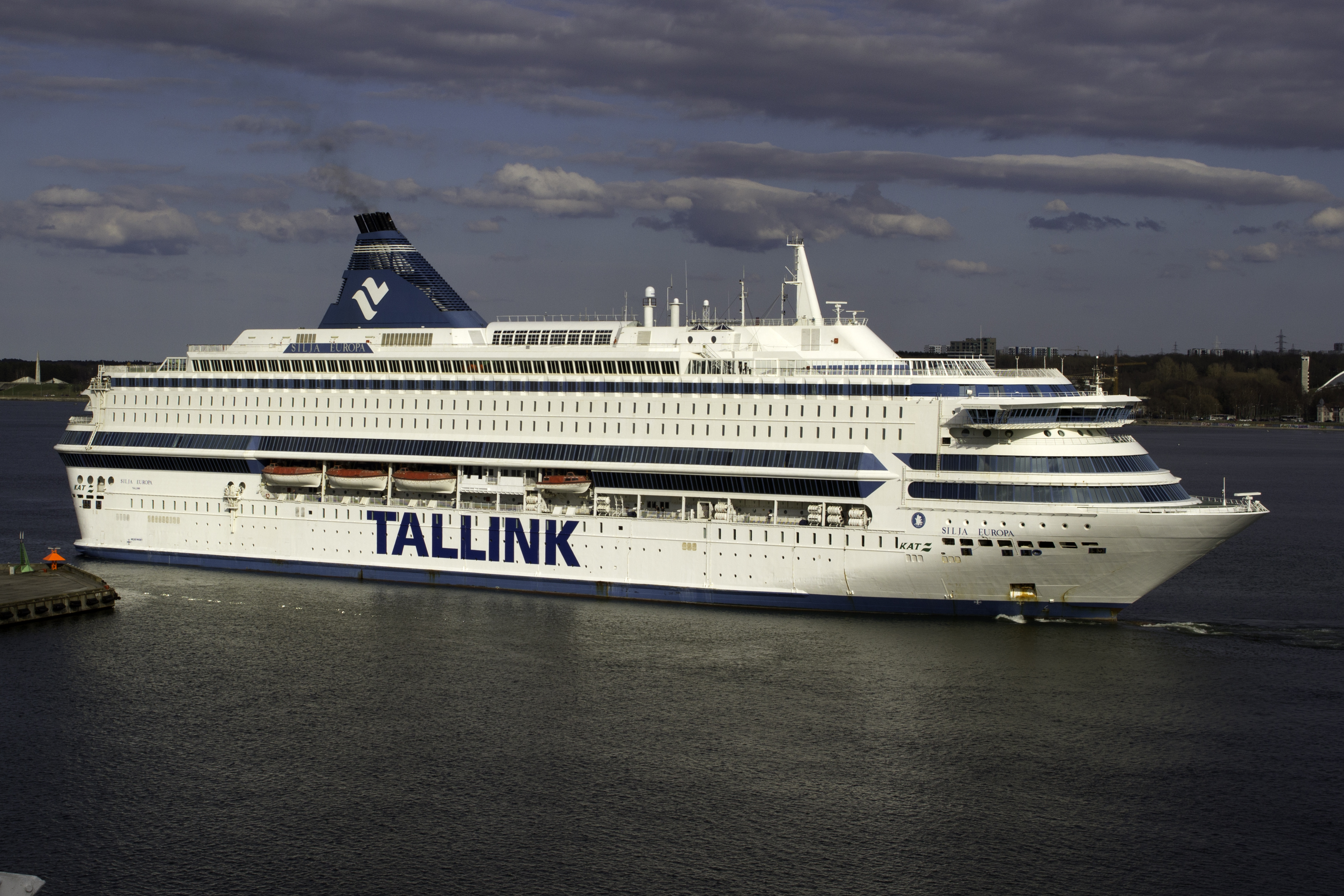
- Silja Europa in 2016

History

Estonia
- Name: Europa (1993); Silja Europa (1993-present)
- Owner: 1993–2003: Fährschiff Europa KB; 2003–2006: Silja Line; 2006 onwards: Tallink
- Operator: 1993–2013: Silja Line; 2013–14: Tallink; 2014–2016: Bridgeman Services; 2016–onwards: Tallink
- Port of registry: 1993–2013: Mariehamn, Finland; 2013 onwards: Tallinn, Estonia
- Route: Charter
- Ordered: 6 October 1989
- Builder: Meyer Werft, Papenburg, West Germany
- Yard number: 627
- Laid down: 6 November 1991
- Launched: 23 January 1993
- Christened: 5 March 1993
- Completed: 6 March 1993
- Maiden voyage: 13 March 1993
- In service: 1993–present
- Refit: (2014) Bridgeman (2016) Tallink
- Identification: Call sign: ESUJ; IMO number: 8919805; MMSI number: 276807000
- Status: Laid up

General characteristics
- Type: Cruiseferry
- Tonnage: 59,914 GT
- Length: 201.78 m (662 ft 0 in)
- Beam: 32.6 m (106 ft 11 in)
- Height: 59 m (193 ft 7 in)
- Draught: 6.8 m (22 ft 4 in)
- Decks: 14
- Ice class: 1 A Super
- Installed power: 4 × MAN 6L58/64; 31,800 kW (combined)
- Propulsion: Two shafts; controllable pitch propellers
- Speed: 22.5 knots (41.7 km/h; 25.9 mph)
- Capacity: 3,123 passengers; 3,644 passenger beds; 450 vehicles (932 lane meters)

Silja Europa is a cruiseferry constructed at Meyer Werft Germany for the Swedish ferry operator Rederi AB Slite, a part of Viking Line. Architect Per Dockson. At 59,914 gross tonnage (GT), she is the largest ship commissioned for and to ever operate for Tallink Silja, and is the tenth-largest cruiseferry in the world.

Just before she was due for delivery, Slite entered economic difficulties and could no longer afford the ship, so Meyer Werft kept her and she was soon chartered to Viking Line's rival, Silja Line. She was put on the Helsinki–Stockholm route, replacing Silja Serenade which was put to the Turku–Mariehamn–Stockholm route, but the two ships swapped routes with each other again in 1995.

== History ==
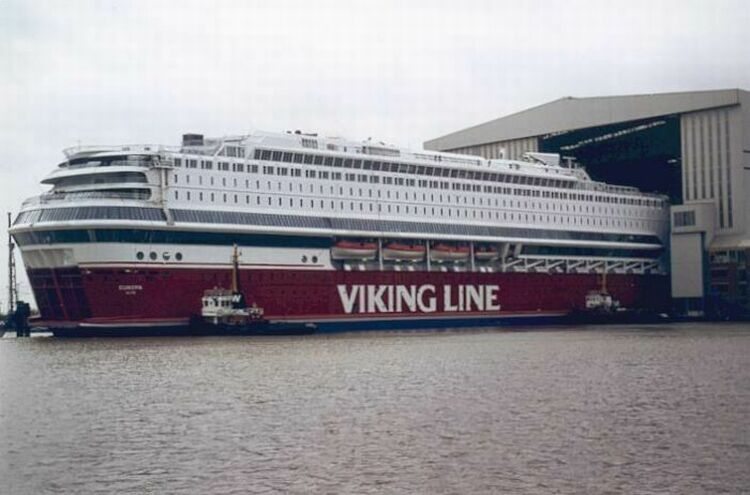
MS Europa under construction in December, 1992

Silja Europa was commissioned by Rederi AB Slite and launched on 23 January 1993. As a result of the 1990-1994 Swedish financial crisis, the Swedish krona was floated in 1992 and consequently lost value. The Europa became kr 500,000,000 more expensive for Slite, whose bank, Nordbanken, had stopped guaranteeing loans. Combined with the construction of other ships, Slite was declared bankrupt in April 1993.

MS Europa as she would have appeared in Viking Line's colours, circa 1992

She was christened the Silja Europa in Hamburg, Germany on 5 March 1993, then registered the next day to Fährschiff Europa KB. With a ten-year charter to Finnish cruiseferry company Silja Line, Silja Europa made her maiden voyage on 14 March 1993.

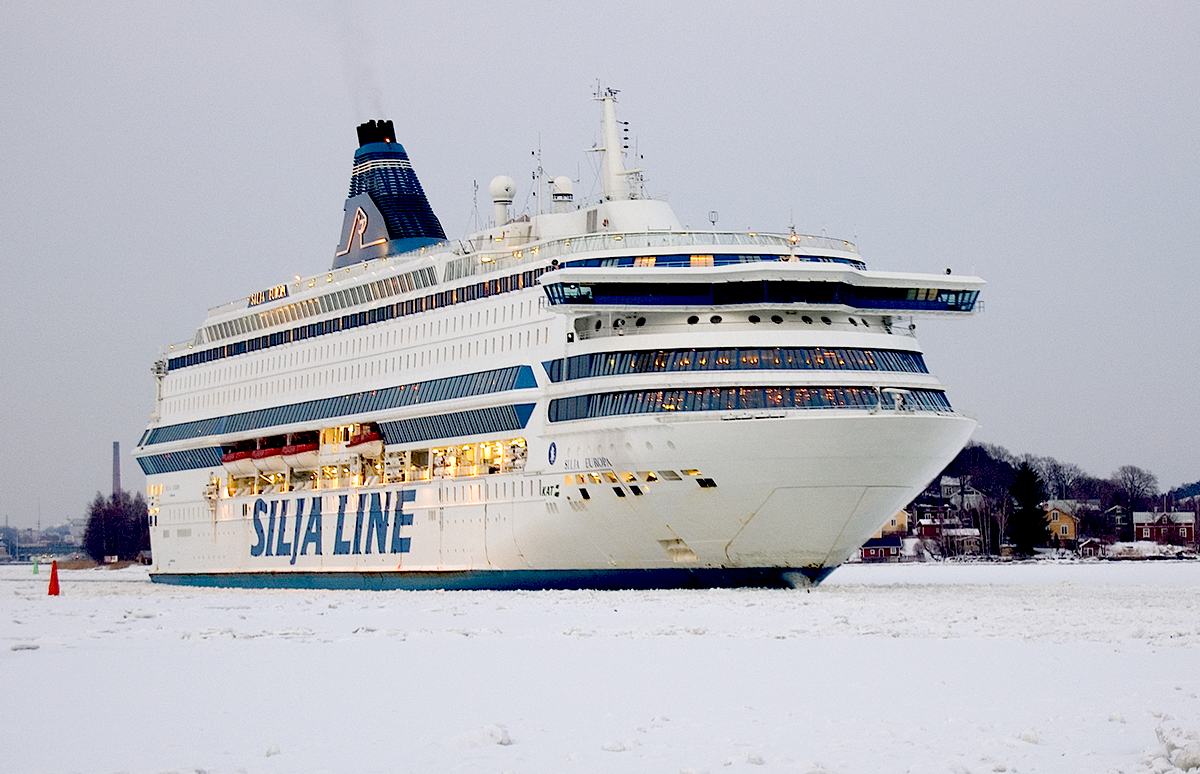
Silja Europa in Silja Line livery in January, 2006

On 28 September 1994, Silja Europa was the first vessel to receive the Mayday message from the sinking Estonia, and became the second vessel to arrive on-scene (after Mariella) following Estonia's capsizing and sinking. The captain of Silja Europa, Esa Mäkelä, was appointed On-Scene Commander for the rescue operation.

In January 2000, a catalytic converter was installed at Aker Finnyards in Rauma, Finland. The funnel received a new blue paintjob, and the ship's safety system was renewed. This was made following the incident of Estonia.

Silja Line was sold to Estonian shipping company Tallink in May 2006 - the Silja Line brand was initially kept separate, but most of its ships (including the Silja Europa) are now in Tallink livery. Silja Europa's home port was changed to Tallinn and entered Tallink's Helsinki–Tallinn service on 23 January 2013. She was then sailed to Australia on a 14-month charter as an accommodation ship for the Gorgon LNG project at Barrow Island. After this charter, Tallink returned Silja Europa to their Helsinki-Tallinn service on 13 March 2016.

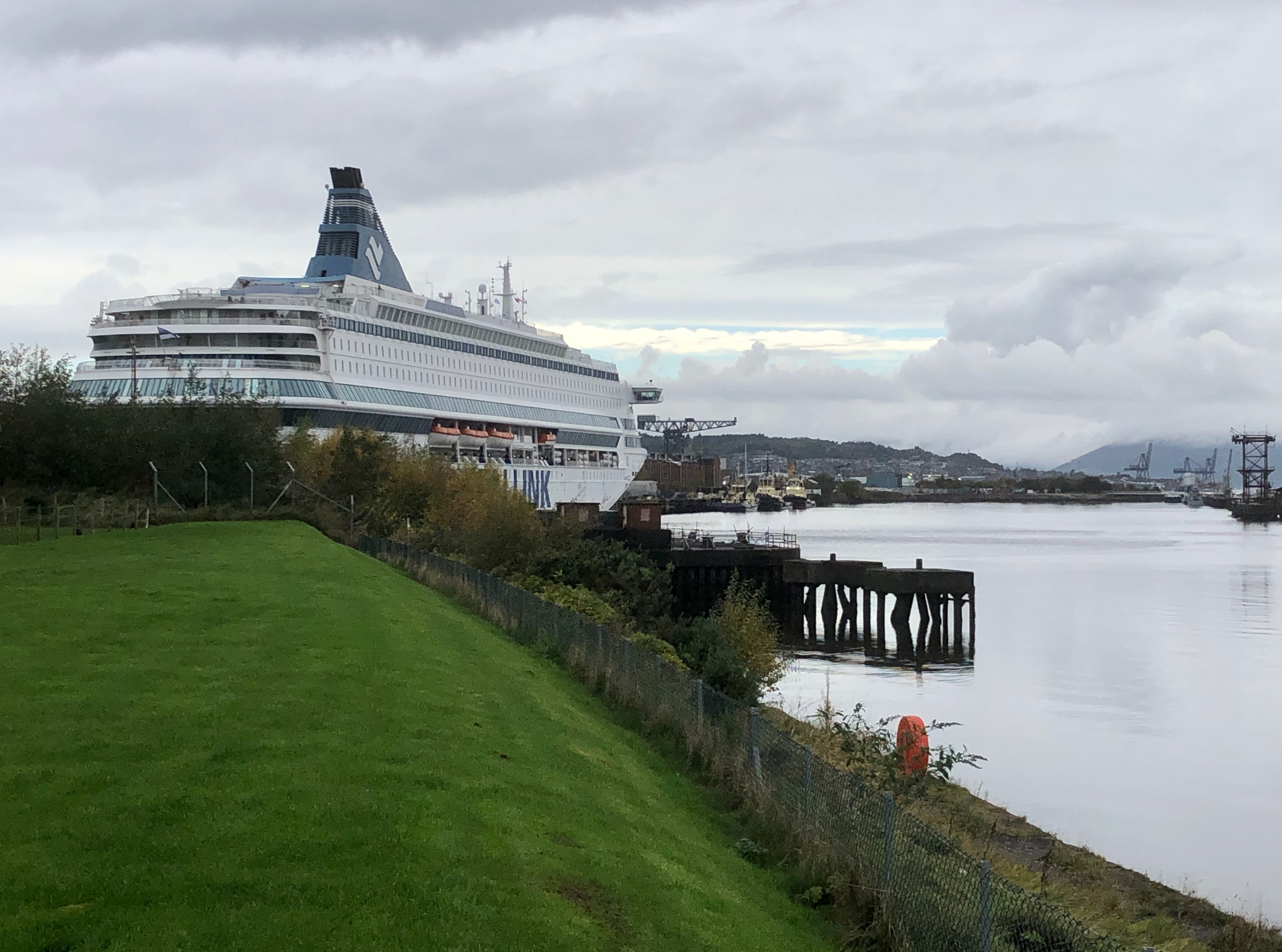
Silja Europa at Inchgreen Quay, Greenock, for the COP26 conference in Glasgow

In 2021, she was hired by Devon & Cornwall Police for a ten-day period during which she is to be moored in Falmouth and used to accommodate police officers during a G7 summit in Carbis Bay scheduled for 11–13 June 2021. In October, she moved to the River Clyde and was berthed at Inchgreen Quay, Greenock, to provide accommodation for delegates at the COP26 summit.

Since September 2022, the Silja Europa was docked at Velsen-Noord to shelter 1,000 asylum seekers until February 2023. The ship arrived in Velsen-Noord on Wednesday September 21st. The ship passed through the IJmuiden Sea Lock at around 6:30 a.m. that morning and moored at the VOB (Velsen Offshore Base ) quay an hour later.

On 1 July 2023, Silja Europa moved from Velsen-Noord to Rotterdam. She is moored in Merwehaven as accommodation ship having ca. 2000 residents on board.

== Accidents and incidents ==
- 28 September 1994 Silja Europa was the first vessel to receive the Mayday message from the sinking Estonia, and became the second vessel to arrive on-scene (after Mariella) following Estonia's capsizing and sinking. The captain of Silja Europa, Esa Mäkelä, was appointed On-Scene Commander for the rescue operation.
- 13 January 1995 – Silja Europa ran aground close to Furusund, Sweden, due to a failure in the automatic speed control system. She continued under her own power to Stockholm, where she was taken out of service and then delivered to Naantali for repair.
- 10 October 1996 – A passenger reported that he saw someone jumping overboard. This was reported to the captain, who notified the Swedish Coast Guard - however, instead of stopping the ship (as is procedure), he continued to Stockholm. Later, the Swedish Coast Guard found the person, a female passenger, in the sea. Her body temperature was very low and she died a couple of days later in hospital of hypothermia. The ship's captain was prosecuted and found guilty of not stopping as he should have, but was not punished.
- 20 August 1997 – The ship collided with a German sailing-boat south of Lemland due to heavy fog. A German couple and their dog were rescued by one of Silja Europa's lifeboats. The sailing boat began to take on water and was later towed to Föglö by the Finnish Border Guard.
- 28 September 2002 – A female passenger fell overboard and swam to a nearby islet, from where she was later rescued.
- 22 November 2009 – Experienced a steering fault while underway from Stockholm to Turku in the Åland archipelago. The ship would have been in immediate danger of running aground, but the ship's crew made it stop by using asymmetric thrust. The ship's emergency steering (KaMeWa BACK-UP) could not be used because the rudder shaft had broken. Silja Europa had 1,373 passengers at the time of the incident. The ship was steered from the shallow and cramped area to wider waters, where it circled for almost a day. The ship was steered using bow thrusters, while there was a continuous effort of diagonosing and fixing the problem at the same time. The next morning, the tug Ukko arrived at Silja Europa and helped it move towards Turku. A team of divers who arrived with the tug investigated the ship's fault at Airisto and found that the fault was caused by damage to the rudder shaft. Silja Europa was supposed to be in Turku on Sunday evening at 7:15 pm, but didn't arrive until Monday, 23 November at 4:30 pm. The ship left for a repair dock on 26 November. During the repair procedures, Silja Europa was replaced on the Turku-Stockholm route by Baltic Queen. Silja Europa returned to service on 19 December 2009.
- 19 October 2019 – Two Finnish passengers (25 y/o and 21y/o) were found deceased in a cabin in the Port of Tallinn.

Preceded by Silja Symphony	World's Largest Cruiseferry; 1992–2002	Succeeded by Pride of Rotterdam
