= Christto & Andrew =

Artist duo

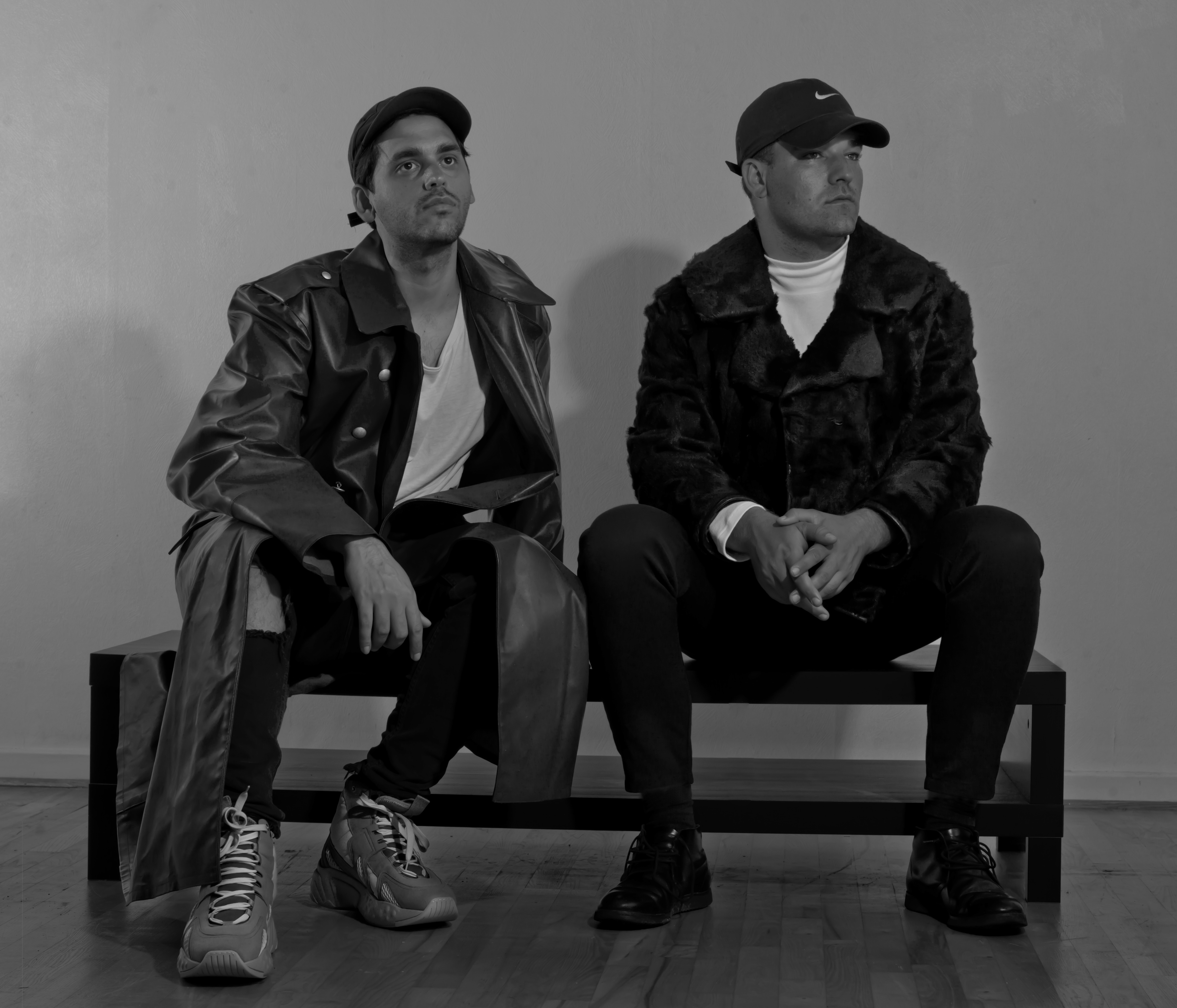
Christto Sanz and Andrew Weir

Christto & Andrew are an artistic duo based in Doha, Qatar, and Copenhagen, Denmark. The duo was formed in 2012 and work across the mediums of photography, mixed media and film. Their work makes use of exposing the effects of structures of history, politics, the economy, popular culture and rigid societal normalities they experience in everyday life using colour and surreal still life portraits.

Christto & Andrew first gained international acclaim with their inclusion in the 2014 Foam Magazine "Talent Issue" and have since exhibited in solo exhibitions, group shows, biennials and art fairs worldwide, including the Multimedia Art Museum, Moscow (2015), Unseen Photo Fair, Amsterdam (2016), NRW - Forum Düsseldorf (2017) and have been included in publications such as Vogue España, Dazed magazine and the British Journal of Photography.

== Biography ==
Christto Sanz (born Christian Manuel Sánchez Diaz in 1985) completed his Bachelor of Arts from Escuela de Arts Plasticas, San Juan Puerto Rico in 2008, followed by his master's degree in Visual Communication and Photography from Elisava School of Design and Engineering, Barcelona in 2010. He was born in San Juan, Puerto Rico.

Andrew Weir (born Andrew Jay Weir in 1987) completed his Bachelor of Business Administration from University Ramon Llull, Barcelona in 2011, followed by a Master of Arts in degree from University College London - Qatar in 2016. He was born in Johannesburg, South Africa.

== Artistic career ==
Christto & Andrew started working together while studying abroad in 2009 in Barcelona, with their artistic union being formed in 2012. The duo is currently living and working between Doha, Qatar and Copenhagen, Denmark and are focusing on mediums in the fields of photography, mixed media and film. They have developed what has been described as a “shared visual language” between real, digital and fictional world they experience in Qatar. Using this, they aim to create a new reality using characters and colour inspired by the mixture of their different backgrounds.

During their artistic career, Christto & Andrew have built a reputation for breaking down the traditional ideas about photography by incorporating tools and methods to create artwork using elements of humour juxtaposed with dark accents using irony and sarcasm for change in how to conceive their art. Their work has employed a contemporary narrative, by using compositions using colourful and surreal still-life and portraits aimed towards a new aesthetic and attempting to challenge the structure and development in the Middle Eastern Gulf states, the rapid societal changes and contradiction of the rigid societal normalities and exposes the effects of structures of history, politics, the economy and popular culture.

== Exhibitions ==
=== Solo exhibitions ===
- Unparalleled Objectives, Katara Art Centre: Doha, Qatar, 2012
- Liquid Portraits, Katara Art Centre: Doha, Qatar, 2014
- Liquid Portraits (Fashion & Style Photography), Multimedia Museum: Moscow, Russia, 2015
- Glory of the Artifice, Premiere Presentation, East Wing, Unseen Photo Fair: Amsterdam, Netherlands, 2015
- Muddy Waters, satellite show of Vogue Photography Festival: Metronom, Milan, 2016
- Glory of the Artifice/Liquid Portraits, Encontros da Imgem: Braga, Portugal, 2016
- Glory of the Artifice/Liquid Portraits - Espai Tactel Gallery: Valencia, Spain, 2016
- Politics of Sport, Unseen: Amsterdam, Netherlands, 2016
- Parataxic Distortion, East Wing: Dubai, United Arab Emirates, 2016
- Bouet Special Project, Espai Tactel Wall, Valencia, Spain, 2017
- Encrypted Purgatory, Les Recontres de la Photographie: Arles France, 2018
- Encrypted Purgatory, Metronom Gallery: Modena, Italy, 2018

=== Biennials ===
- Colombo Biennale, Colombo, Sri Lanka, 2014
