= Kalypso (software) =

Kalypso is an open source modelling program. It focuses on numerical simulations in water management and ecology such as the generation of inundation and flood risk maps by hydrologic and hydrodynamic models and GIS functionality.

The Kalypso software system has been collaboratively developed in a joint project by the company Björnsen Consulting Engineers (BCE) and the department for river and coastal engineering at Hamburg University of Technology, Germany. It is available for download at SourceForge.net under the GNU LGPL.

== Kalypso Modules ==
Kalypso is currently (November 2010) divided into six modules: three numerical simulation modules, two tools for complex flood and risk mapping and an evacuation tool.

- Kalypso Hydrology (rainfall-runoff simulation)
- Kalypso WSPM (one-dimensional steady hydrodynamic simulation)
- Kalypso 1D/2D (coupled one- and two-dimensional unsteady hydrodynamic simulation)
- Kalypso Flood (flood mapping tool)
- Kalypso Risk (flood risk assessment tool)
- Kalypso Evacuation (evacuation strategy tool)

The modules are based on a common modelling framework called KalypsoBASE and are published as open source software under the LGPL license. KalypsoBASE itself is a collection of Eclipse plug-ins and can be easily extended to provide new and independent modules.

== Projects ==
A few software projects are using KalypsoBASE.

=== nofdp IDSS ===
nofdp (nature-oriented flood damage prevention) is a decision support system designed by the Hessian Ministry for Environment, Rural Areas and Consumer Protection (Germany) in the context of the EU INTERREG III B program in order to provide means for environmentally-oriented flood protection measures.

The nofdp IDSS has been designed as a tool for planners and decision makers in water resources engineering allowing them to have an integrative view on river catchment areas. This is used to improve flood damage protection taking into account aspects of spatial planning, water resources management and ecology.

== Notes ==
This article incorporates text from the Kalypso article at GISWiki, where the content is licensed under the GFDL.
