= Rederi AB Slite =

Swedish shipping company

Rederi AB Slite was a Swedish shipping company, founded in 1947. The company was one of the three founding companies of Viking Line. Rederi AB Slite went bankrupt in 1993.

== History ==
=== Early history ===
Rederi AB Slite was founded by Carl Bertil Myrsten together with his siblings Inga Gattberg, Sven Myrsten and Lars Myrsten in 1947. The oldest brother Robert Myrsten had his own shipping company Rederi AB Robert Myrsten and was not part of Rederi AB Slite. The Myrsten family, from Slite on the island of Gotland, had been in the shipping business since 1867, when Johan Niclas Myrsten founded the dynasty.

In mid-1950s, two newbuilt cargo ships, MS Slite and MS Boge, were delivered to Slite. In 1959 and 1961 respectively they were rebuilt to be able to load cars and take passengers. These ships were then put on a route between Simpnäs north of Stockholm and Mariehamn on Åland. In 1964 the company's first purpose built ferry MS Apollo was delivered. In the early 1960s there was a heavy competition from several companies on the route Sweden – Åland. This led to a cooperation between Slite and Rederi Ab Vikinglinjen, which later became a part of Rederi Ab Sally.

In 1966, the marketing company Viking Line was founded and by now Ålandsfärjan Ab, later SF Line, had joined the cooperation. Viking Line initially had three ships, Ålandsfärjan Ab's SS Ålandsfärjan, Vikinglinjen's SS Viking and Slite's Apollo. Since the name of the marketing company came from one of the other founding companies, Carl Bertil Myrsten demanded that the colour of Viking Line's ships would originate from his company. The discussion regarding colour ended when Inga Gattberg took her favourite lip stick and made a mark on the contract with the words "This is the colour we are going to use". All Viking Line's ships were therefore painted in Apollo's original red colour that now is so characteristic for Viking Line.

=== Growing period ===
During the 1970s and 1980s, ferry traffic between Sweden and Finland expanded heavily. In 1970, Slite's second MS Apollo was delivered from Jos L Meyer in West Germany. Her sister MS Diana entered service two years later.

Due to the increasing internal competition between the three companies within Viking Line, the original route between Kapellskär and Naantali was clogged with Viking Line ships during the first years of the 1970s. The companies tried new routes for their increasing fleets. Rederi Ab Sally and SF Line started traffic between Stockholm and Turku, and Sally also acquired two ships for the Stockholm-Helsinki route. Slite in turn chose to start 24-hour cruises between Stockholm and Mariehamn with the venerable SS Svea Jarl, purchased in 1976 from Silja Line and renamed SS Apollo III. To finance the purchase, the 1970-built Apollo was sold.

In 1979, Diana was replaced by the new building MS Diana II. For a couple of years, Diana II serviced on the Stockholm-Turku route but Sally pushed her back to Kapellskär-Naantali with their bigger MS Viking Sally.

=== Heavy expansion ===
Economic difficulties plagued Rederi Ab Sally in the early 1980s. Despite having the big Viking Sally on the Stockholm – Turku route plus two new large ships on the capital route between Stockholm and Helsinki, Sally was not able to invest in more new ships. This left a spot open for Slite and SF Line to take over the capital route. In 1986, Slite's MS Olympia, at the time the largest passenger ferry in the world, was put into service between Stockholm and Helsinki, replacing Sally's the MS Viking Saga.

In October 1987, Rederi Ab Sally was sold to Effoa, the main owner of rival company Silja Line. The situation of having the main competitor owning 33% of Viking Line became untenable and Sally's shares of Viking Line were sold to Slite and SF Line. Sally's remaining ship in Viking Line service, the Viking Sally, was chartered to Slite for the next three years.

Around the same time, SF Line and Slite ordered new ships again. Slite's MS Athena (1989) replaced the Apollo III in 1989 and by 1990 it was time for the Viking Sally to be replaced with Athena's sister, the MS Kalypso. The Olympia was scheduled for replacement in 1993 when the jewel of the company's crown, the world's largest passenger ferry, MS Europa was to be delivered.

=== Crisis and bankruptcy ===
The timing of ordering of new expensive cruise ferries couldn't have been worse for Rederi AB Slite. In October 1989, just weeks after the order of the Europa was signed, the Finnish shipyard Wärtsilä Marine went bankrupt. Wärtsilä had built the Athena for Slite and was about to finish her sister, the Kalypso. The bankruptcy resulted in an increased cost for the Kalypso, about 200 million SEK.

Matters became worse when the Swedish krona was allowed to float in the autumn of 1992. Because of this, the almost finished Europa built in Germany, suddenly became 500 million SEK more expensive. Slite became unable to pay for the Europa when their bank Nordbanken, which at the time had large sums invested in Slite's main rival Silja Line, withdrew their loan guarantees. After the loss of Europa, Slite had lost over 550 million SEK within two years, 200 million due to the increased costs for the Kalypso and 350 million lost in advance payments for the Europa. Consequently, Slite was declared bankrupt in April 1993.

=== Aftermath ===
All Slite's ships were sold by compulsory auction after the bankruptcy. SF Line made bids on the Athena and the Kalypso but lost them to the heavily investing Malaysian cruise company Star Cruises. SF Line became the sole owner of Viking Line and changed its name to Viking Line Ab.

After the auction of Slite's ships and other assets, it became clear that the bankruptcy was unnecessary. All the debts could be paid for with the money gained from the ship sales. It has been speculated that Nordbanken did everything they could to break Slite to help their financially poor Silja Line. In March 1993 the Europa entered service for Silja Line as the Silja Europa.

The company was then forced to sell all of its fleet. One of their largest vessels, MS Olympia, was sold to Irish Continental Group and chartered out to P&O Ferries where it was renamed Pride of Bilbao. It operated at P&O for 17 years until 2010.

== Ships ==
This list of ships owned or chartered to Rederi AB Slite, but may be incomplete

- Slite (in fleet 1955–1964)
- Boge (1956–1963)
- Apollo (1964–1968)
- Visby (1967–1970, chartered)
- Apollo (II) (1970–1976)
- Diana (1972–1979)
- Apollo III (1976–1989)
- Diana II (1979–1992)
- Olympia (1986–1993)
- Viking Sally (1987–1990, chartered)
- Athena (1989–1993)
- Kalypso (1990–1993)
- Europa (1993, never delivered)
