= List of ship decommissionings in 1990 =

The list of ship decommissionings in 1990 includes a chronological list of all ships decommissioned in 1990.

Date	Operator	Ship	Flag	Class and type	Fate	Other notes
January	Royal Admiral Cruises	Stardancer	Bahamas	Cruiseferry	Sold to Royal Caribbean Cruise Lines	Renamed Viking Serenade
6 February	CTC Cruises	Alexandr Pushkin	Soviet Union	Ivan Franko-class passenger ship	Returned to Far Eastern Shipping Company, laid up	Sold to Orient Lines, 1991; renamed Marco Polo, entered service 1993
6 March	Jakob Lines	Botnia Express	Finland	Ferry	Returned to Vaasanlaivat-Vasabåtarna	Re-chartered to Baltic Express Line, but never entered service; laid up in Vaasa; sold to Eckerö Linjen in 1992
April	Rederi AB Slite	Viking Sally	Finland	Cruiseferry	End of charter	Transferred to Silja Line; renamed Silja Star
5 May	Silja Line	Finlandia	Finland	Cruiseferry	Sold to Scandinavian Seaways	Renamed Queen of Scandinavia
21 May	Olau Line	Olau Britannia	West Germany	Cruiseferry	Sold to Fred Olsen Lines	Renamed Bayard
May	Europe Cruise Line	Eurosun	Bermuda	Cruise ship	Chartered to Sea Containers	Renamed Orient Express
1 June	Scandinavian Seaways	Dana Regina	Denmark	Ferry	Sold to Nordström & Thulin	Renamed Nord Estonia for EstLine traffic
18 October	Stena Line (Canada)	Crown Princess Victoria	Sweden	Ferry	Laid up	Sold to Starlite Cruises in December, renamed Pacific Star
14 September	Jahre Line	Prinsesse Ragnhild	Norway	Cruiseferry	Transferred to Color Line	Continued on same route
October	Jahre Line	Kronprins Harald	Norway	Cruiseferry	Transferred to Color Line	Continued on same route
November	Silja Line	Silja Star	Finland	Cruiseferry	Transferred to Wasa Line	Renamed Wasa King
November	Sea Containers	Orient Express	Bermuda	Cruise ship	End of charter, returned to Europe Cruise Line	Renamed Eurosun
1 December	Royal Navy	Achilles		Leander-class frigate	Decommissioned	Sold to Chile, renamed Ministro Zenteno
29 December	Fred. Olsen Lines	Braemar	Norway	Cruiseferry	Laid up	Chartered to Baltic Line, 1991; renamed Anna Karenina
Date uncertain	Royal Navy	Danae		Leander-class frigate	Decommissioned	Sold to Ecuador, renamed Morán Valverde
Date uncertain	Sigma Ferries	Neraida II	Greece	Ferry	Sold to Ventouris Ferries	Renamed Ydra

== Bibliography ==
- Colledge, J. J.; Warlow, Ben & Bush, Steve (2020). Ships of the Royal Navy: The Complete Record of all Fighting Ships of the Royal Navy from the 15th Century to the Present (5th revised and updated ed.). Barnsley, UK: Seaforth Publishing. ISBN 978-1-5267-9327-0.
