= Port of Kiel =

Port for passenger and cargo shipping located in Kiel, Germany

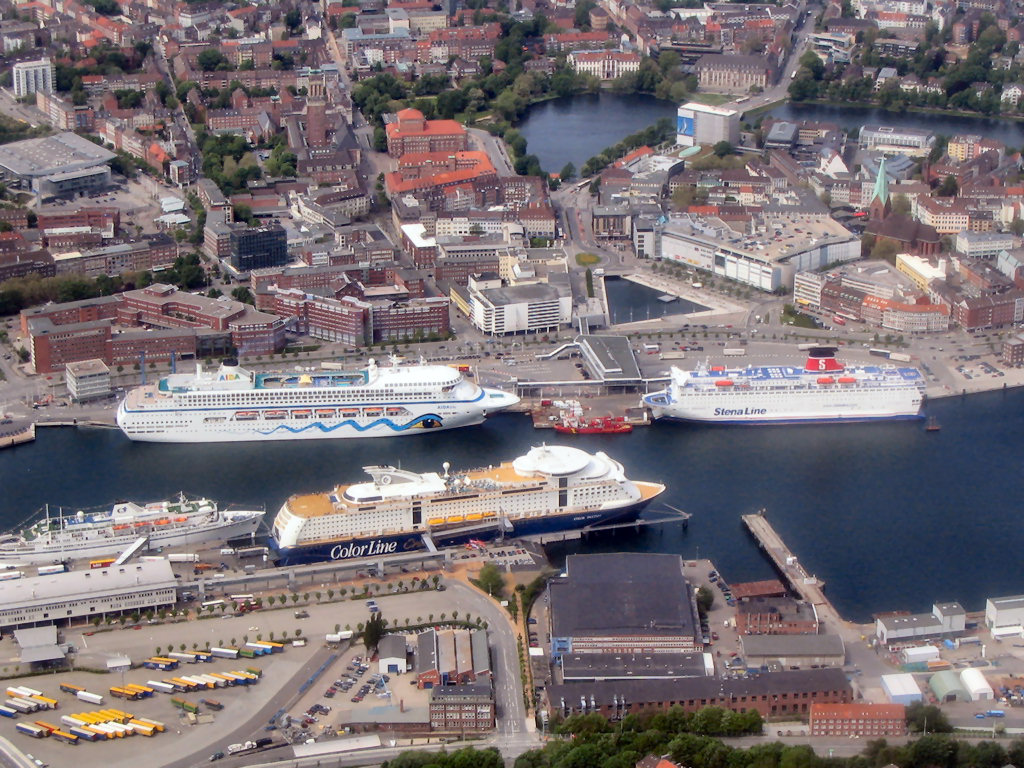
- Ferries in the Port of Kiel

Location
- Country: Germany
- Location: Kiel
- Coordinates: 54.3179°N 10.1389°E
- UN/LOCODE: DE KEL

Details
- Operated by: Seehafen Kiel GmbH & Co. KG
- Owned by: City of Kiel

Statistics
- Annual cargo tonnage: 7.1 million (2018)
- Passenger traffic: 2.2 million (2018)
- Website portofkiel.com

The Port of Kiel (German: Kieler Hafen) is a port for passenger and cargo shipping located in Kiel, Germany. It occupies the inner part of the Baltic Sea inlet Kieler Förde and includes the approach to the locks at the eastern end of Kiel Canal.

== Harbours ==
The port offers sheltered harbours, large turning basins, and deep water berths.

=== Inner Harbour ===
At the southern end of Kieler Förde lies the Inner Harbour (German: Stadthafen) with passenger terminals Ostseekai and Schwedenkai in the west and Norwegenkai on the eastern side. Ferries of the liner services to Scandinavia are based here and cruise ships call during summer.

=== Ostuferhafen ===
Located on the east bank of Kieler Förde, Ostuferhafen (English: East Side Harbour) is the largest coherent part of the port with a total area of 500,000 m² and a quay length of 1,700 m. It is primarily a cargo harbour with ro-ro and container terminals for the liner traffic to Northern Sweden, Russia and the Baltic states. Since June 2014 it also hosts one cruise berth.

=== Canal Harbours ===
The Canal Harbours (German: Kanalhäfen) are located on the Kiel Canal. Nordhafen is situated on the southern side of the canal and has facilities for timber, bulk cargo, ro-ro, and container vessels. The bulk terminal Scheerhafen is situated immediately south of the canal locks and is formed by two moles.

== Passenger and cargo traffic ==
Kiel’s main passenger shipping business are regularly scheduled cruiseferries to Norway, Sweden, and Lithuania which served 1.6 million passengers in 2018. Behind Puttgarden on Fehmarn and Rostock, Kiel is Germany's third busiest port for international passenger traffic.

The two Color Line cruiseferries Color Magic and Color Fantasy offer a daily 20-hour connection from Norwegenkai to Oslo in Norway. Stena Line operates the two cruiseferries Stena Germanica and Stena Scandinavica on a daily 14.5-hour connection from Schwedenkai to Gothenburg in Sweden. DFDS Seaways runs a daily 21-hour connection from Ostuferhafen to Klaipėda in Lithuania with the two RoPax ferries Athena Seaways and Regina Seaways.

The port's season for cruise ships runs from early-April through late-October, and 169 vessels called at the port in 2018. During the season, Kiel acts as home port for several vessels from the AIDA Cruises and TUI Cruises fleet. Almost 600.000 cruise passengers were handled in 2018.

The Swedish paper company SCA operates two ro-ro vessels between Kiel and Sundsvall in Sweden once a week, exporting paper products to Germany.

The port is owned by the city of Kiel and operated by Seehafen Kiel GmbH & Co. KG. For the year 2018, the port reported over 7.1 million tons of cargo and 2.2 million passengers (ferry and cruise) handled.

== See also ==
- Ports of the Baltic Sea
