= SuperSpeed 1 =

Ferry built in 2008

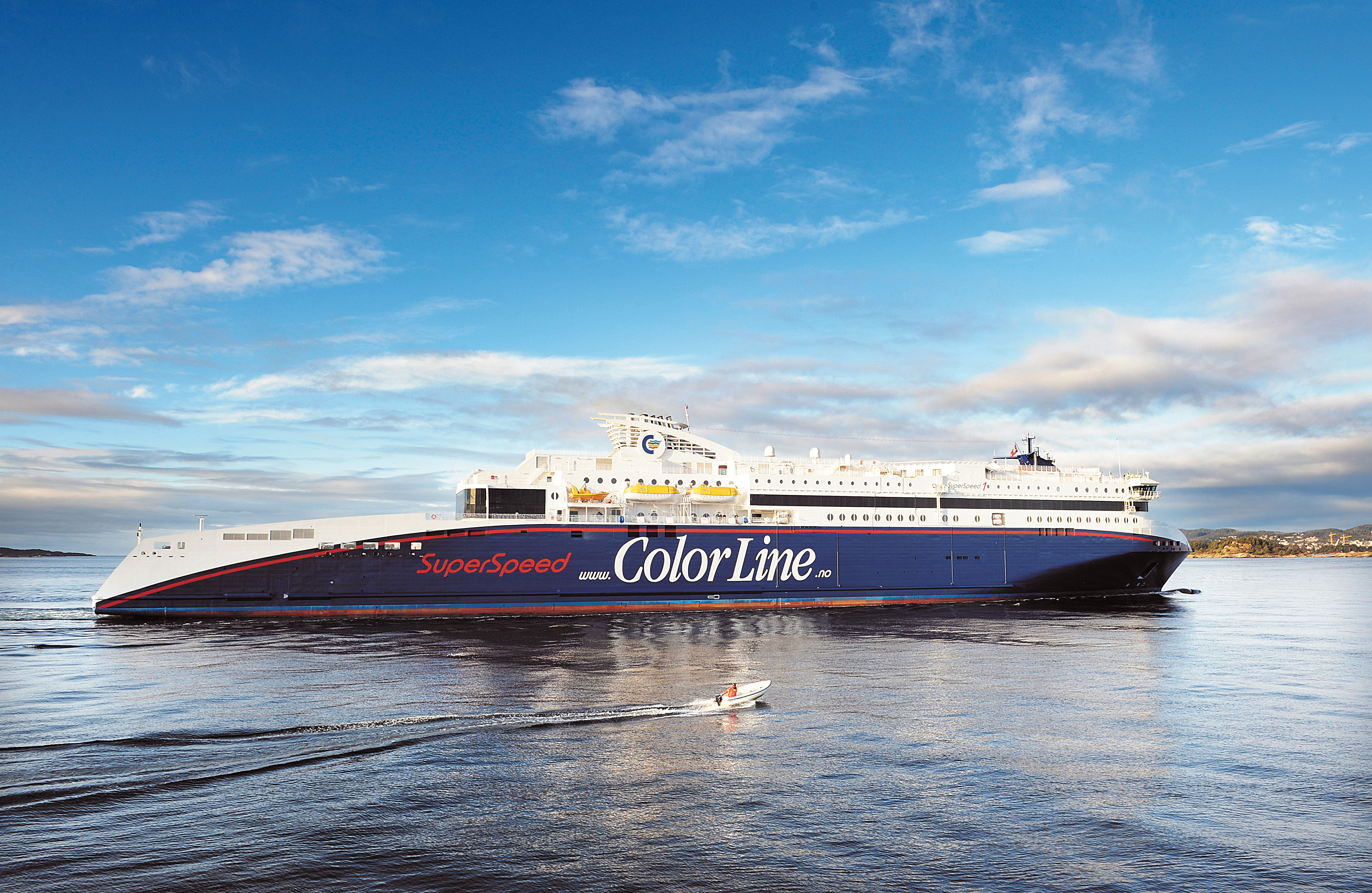
- SuperSpeed 1

History
- Name: SuperSpeed 1
- Owner: Color Line
- Operator: Color Line
- Port of registry: Kristiansand, Norway
- Route: Kristiansand—Hirtshals
- Ordered: 15 December 2005
- Builder: Aker Finnyards, Rauma, Finland
- Cost: €126 million
- Yard number: 1359
- Laid down: 28 February 2007
- Launched: 1 August 2007
- Acquired: 27 February 2008
- In service: 13 March 2008
- Identification: IMO number: 9374519; MMSI number: 259490000; Callsign: JWNH
- Status: In service

General characteristics
- Class & type: SuperSpeed class fast ropax ferry
- Tonnage: 34,231 GT
- Length: 211.3 m (693 ft 3 in)
- Beam: 25.80 m (84 ft 8 in)
- Draught: 6.70 m (22 ft 0 in)
- Decks: 11
- Installed power: 4 × Wärtsilä 9L46 diesels, combined 38,400 kW
- Speed: 27 kn (50.00 km/h) service speed; 31 kn (57.41 km/h) maximum speed
- Capacity: 2,400 people total after expansion in 2011 (crew + passengers); 2,325 passengers; 54 passenger berths; 764 cars; 2,036 lanemeters
- Crew: 75

SuperSpeed 1 is a fast roll-on/roll-off ferry owned and operated by Color Line. She was built by Aker Finnyards, Rauma, Finland in 2008, and entered service on the Kristiansand—Hirtshals route on 13 March 2008.

== Concept and construction ==
Since its establishment in 1991, Color Line had operated various conventional ferries between Norway and Denmark. From 1996 onwards fast ferries were used to enhance the service during the Northern Hemisphere summer season. After an evaluation period of several years, the company began the planning process for two new large, fast, ferries in spring 2004, with the concept name Color Line Superspeed. The new ships were planned with a high enough service speed to eliminate the need for overnight crossings entirely and as a result they only include cabins for truck drivers and the ships crew. On 15 December 2005 the construction of the ships was awarded to Aker Finnyards' Rauma shipyard. Aker Finnyards had previously built what was at the time the world's largest cruiseferry Color Fantasy for Color, and was at the time in the process of building Color Magic, a slightly enlarged version of Color Fantasy. The delivery times for the Color Line Superspeed vessels were originally planned for December 2007 for the first ship and April 2008 for the second. Due to delays in construction, including technical problems with one of the auxiliary engines, the first ship, Superspeed 1, was not delivered to Color Line until 27 February 2008.

== Design ==
Both the exterior and interior design of SuperSpeed 1 was handled by the Oslo-based Falkum-Hansen Design.

=== Exterior design ===
The hull shape of the SuperSpeed 1 has been designed for optimized speed performance and good sea-keeping characteristics. The ship has a fairly high, short bow, a rounded superstructure raising straight up to the bridge. The rear of the ship is relatively long, with a large entry space between the rear of the superstructure and the actual rear of the ship. The hull has been painted in the traditional dark blue of Color Line, with a red decorative stripe on top of the blue area. The blue hull paint raises upwards in an arch from the front of the ship, following the shape of the bow, and then arches all the way down to the waterline at the rear. A wide black stripe has been painted along the windows on deck 8, and the window frames of the bridge and the rears windows on deck 7 and 8 are also painted black. The funnel, located very close to amidship, is of a similar design to the funnels of Color Fantasy and Color Magic.

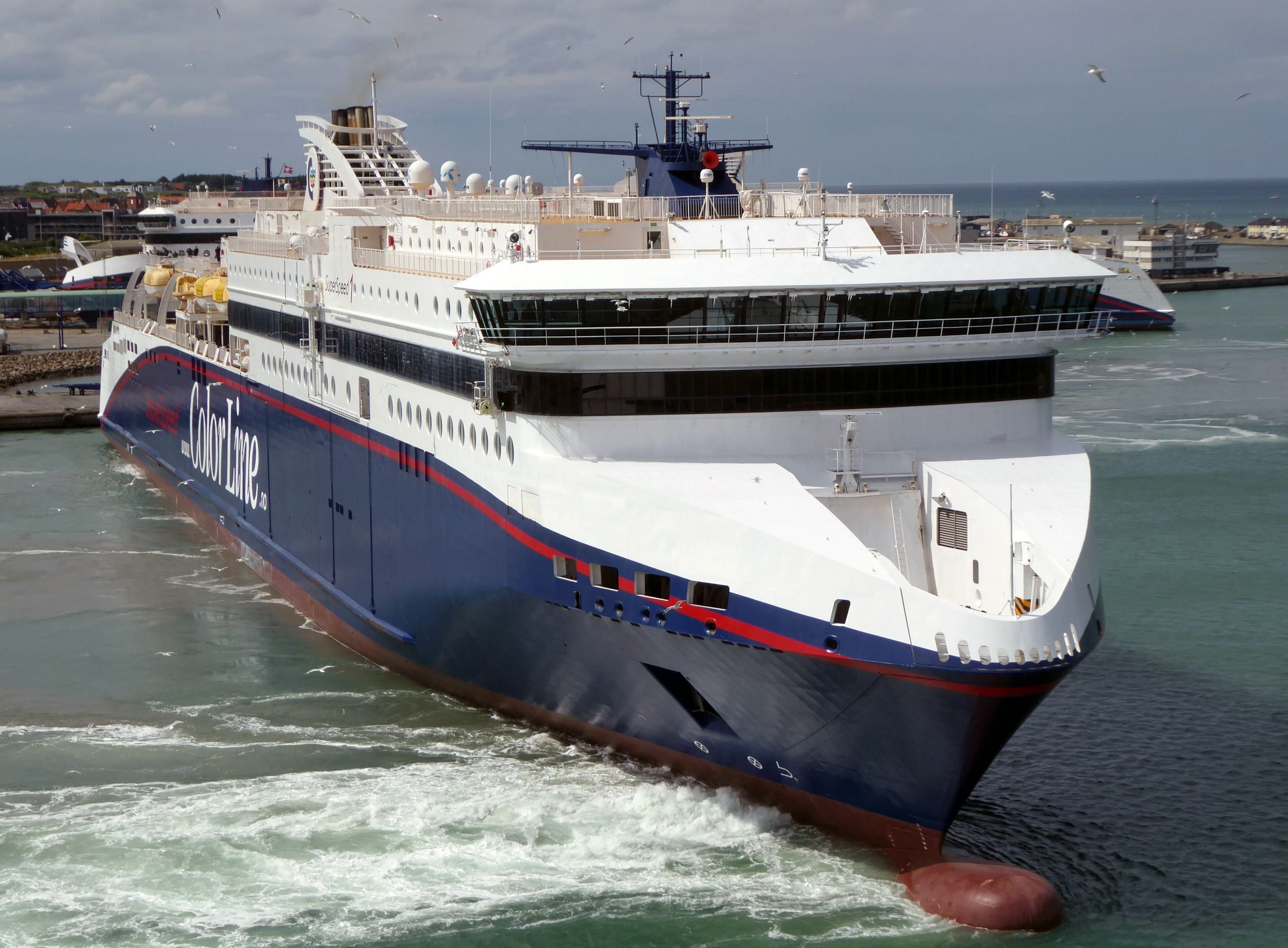
SuperSpeed 1 turning at Hirtshals in 2021

=== Interior design ===
Most passenger spaces on SuperSpeed 1 are located on decks 7 and 8, above the multi-deck car deck complex and storage rooms. A two-deck high atrium is located by the entrance amidship.

=== Engines ===
The main engines consist of four medium-speed diesel engines (Wärtsilä type 9L46), each with 9,600 kilowatts (12,900 hp) power at 500 rpm, acting on two Rolls-Royce-Kamewa propellers. The auxiliary engines for generating electric power are four Wärtsilä diesel engines of type 6L32 each with 3,000 kW (4,000 hp). Two bow thrusters each with 2,400 kW (3,200 hp) and a stern thruster with 1,200 kW (1,600 hp) are installed for safe maneuvering e.g. in the port of Hirtshals.

SuperSpeed 1, without the aft extension of the superstructure, ported at Kristiansand
