= MS Kronprins Harald =

Several motor ships have borne the name Kronprins Harald, after Harald V of Norway:

- Three car ferries, all originally owned and operated by Jahre Line connecting Kiel, Germany and Oslo, Norway, were named Kronprins Harald:
- Kronprins Harald (1) (in service from 1961–1974), after which she was sold to Vietnam Ocean Shipping Co and renamed Ha Long, then in 1979 to Thong Nhat. In 1991 she was put in service by the Afroessa Line. In 1997 she was renamed Medousa. As of February 2015 she was docked at Aliağa, Turkey as scrap.
- Kronprins Harald (2) (in service from 1976–1987), then sold to DFDS and renamed MS Hamburg, serving the Harwich-Hamburg route. In 1997 she was renamed Admiral of Scandinavia when reassigned to the IJmuiden-Newcastle-Hamburg route. She continued on services out of Newcastle until 2002 when she transferred to the Harwich-Cuxhaven route until November 2002. In 2003 she entered service between Puerto Rico-Santo Domingo as MS Caribbean Express. In 2010, the ship was decommissioned after 34 years of service and sold to Carrizona Ltd. for scrapping in India. Due to an engine failure, she lay off the coast of Cape Town from 20 to 31 October 2010. She finally arrived in Alang, India, for scrapping on 25 January 2011.
- Kronprins Harald (in service from 1986–2007), after which she was sold to Irish Ferries and became MS Oscar Wilde
