= Prinsesse Ragnhild =

Prinsesse Ragnhild may refer to:

- Princess Ragnhild of Norway (1930 – 2012)
- MS Prinsesse Ragnhild or MV Jimei, a 1966 Norwegian ferry
- MS Prinsesse Ragnhild or MS Bahamas Celebration, a 1981 Norwegian ferry
- SS Prinsesse Ragnhild, a 1931 Norwegian coastal express ship, sunk in 1940
