= GNV Allegra =

Ship built in 1987

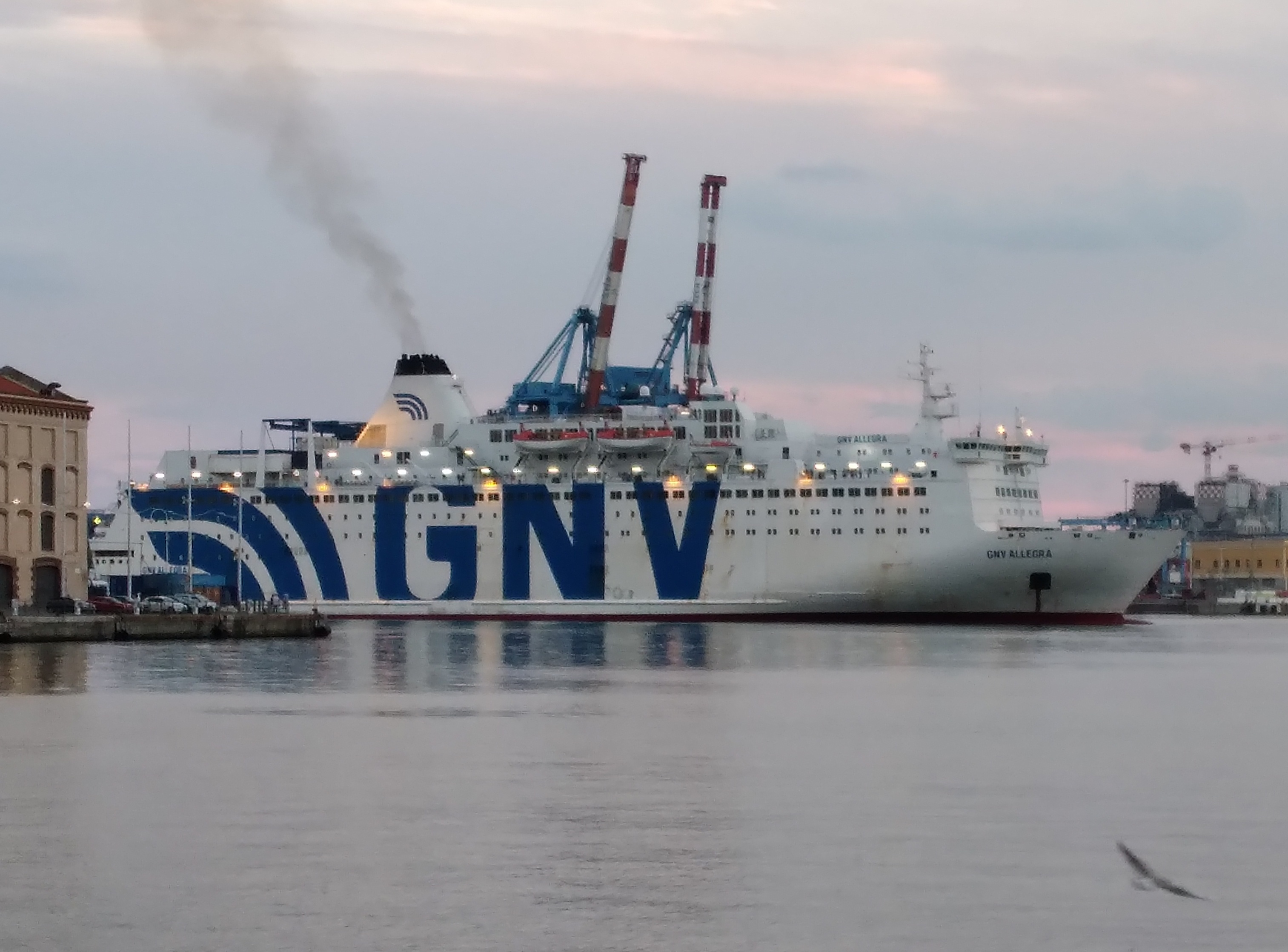
- MS GNV Allegra

History
- Name: 1987–2007: Kronprins Harald; 2007–2019: Oscar Wilde; 2019–present: GNV Allegra
- Owner: 1987–1990: Jahre Line; 1990–2003: Color Line; 2003–2007: M/V Color Harald AS; 2007–2019: Irish Continental Group; 2019–present: MSC
- Operator: 1987–1990: Jahre Line; 1990–2007: Color Line; 2007–2019: Irish Ferries; 2019–present: GNV
- Builder: Wärtsilä Marine Perno shipyard, Turku, Finland
- Yard number: 1292
- Launched: 31 August 1986
- Christened: 23 March 1987
- Acquired: 23 March 1987
- In service: 26 March 1987
- Home port: 1987–1990: Sandefjord, Norway; 1990–2007: Oslo, Norway; 2007–2019: Nassau, Bahamas; 2019–present: Limassol, Cyprus
- Identification: IMO number: 8506311

General characteristics (as built)
- Tonnage: 31,122 GT; 5,250 DWT
- Length: 166.30 m (545.60 ft)
- Beam: 28.41 m (93.21 ft)
- Draught: 6.50 m (21.33 ft)
- Installed power: 2 × Sulzer-Wärtsilä 12ZAV40; 2 × Sulzer-Wärtsilä 6ZAL40; 19,800 kW (combined)
- Speed: 22 knots (41 km/h; 25 mph)
- Capacity: 1,440 passengers; 1,440 passenger beds; 700 cars; 1,220 lanemeters

General characteristics (currently)
- Tonnage: 31,914 GT
- Length: 166m
- Speed: 21.5 knots (39.8 km/h; 24.7 mph) (service); 26 knots (48 km/h; 30 mph) (maximum)
- Capacity: 1,458 passengers; 580 cars; 1,220 lanemeters
- Notes: Otherwise same as built

GNV Allegra is a cruiseferry owned by MSC. The ship was built by Wärtsilä Marine's Perno shipyard in Turku, Finland for Jahre Line as MS Kronprins Harald. In 1991 she passed under ownership of Color Line, for whom she sailed until sold to Irish Ferries in 2007. She was sold by Irish Ferries to Mediterranean Shipping Company (MSC) in 2019 and renamed GNV Allegra for service in the fleet of MSC subsidiary Grandi Navi Veloci.

== History ==
On delivery Kronprins Harald was placed on Jahre Line's Oslo – Kiel service. In 1990 Jahre Line merged with Norway Line and Fred. Olsen Lines to form Color Line. After the change Kronprins Harald was kept on the same route, only her livery changed from the grey hull of Jahre Line to blue hull of Color Line.

=== Kronprins Harald during her service with Color Line. ===
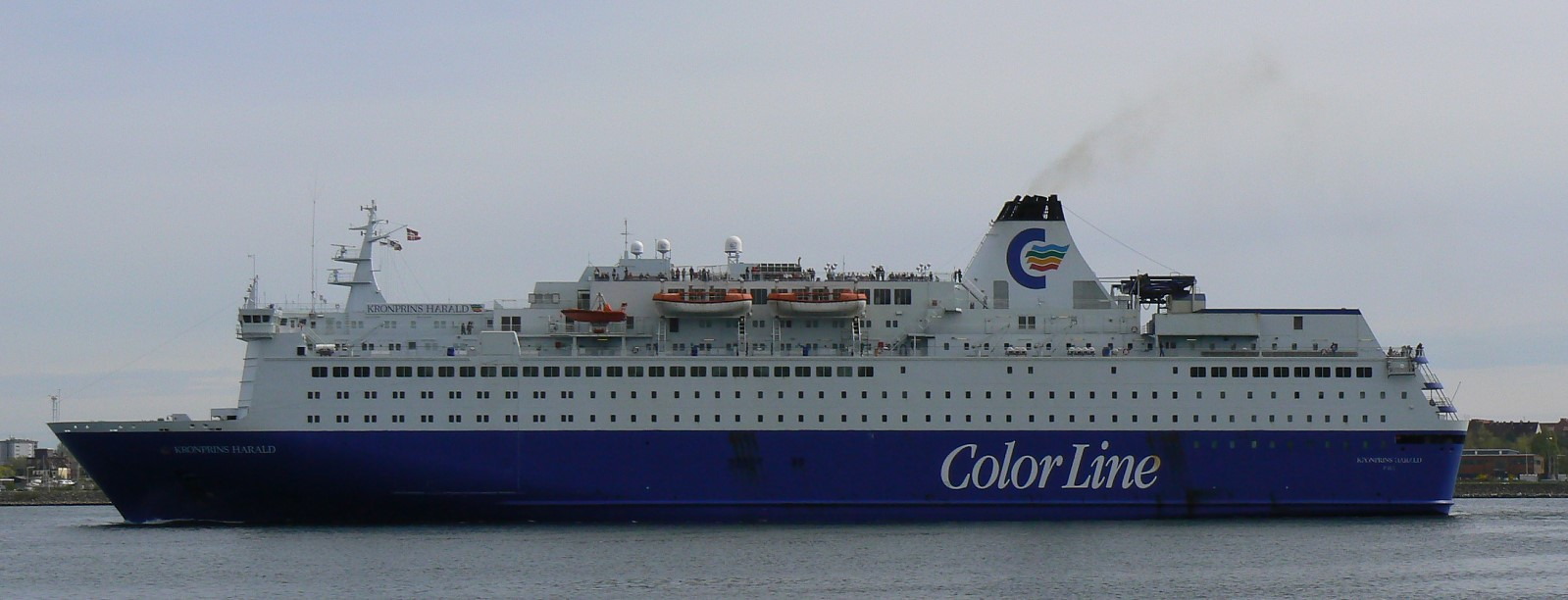
Kronprins Harald in 2007

In January 2007 the ship was sold to Irish Ferries in preparation for the delivery of Color Line's new mega-cruiseferry MS Color Magic. Irish Ferries chartered the Kronprins Harald back to Color Line until September 2007. The vessel's final sailing for Color Line took place on 31 August 2007 with the northbound Kiel – Oslo crossing. With her Color Line career over, Irish Ferries took control over her on 2 September 2007. Arriving for rebuilding at Fredericia Skibsværft on 4 September, she was renamed Oscar Wilde. She entered service with Irish Ferries in December 2007, replacing MS Normandy.

Unlike other Irish Ferries ships, Oscar Wilde kept her blue hull and white funnel instead of a white hull and a green funnel. On 21 November 2007 the ship arrived in Rosslare Harbour for the first time, and entered service on the Rosslare – Cherbourg route on 30 November 2007. In January 2010 there was no service between Rosslare and Cherbourg as she was operating the Rosslare – Pembroke Dock route during the docking of MS Isle of Inishmore. and after this Oscar Wilde was in dry dock for the annual overhaul.

On 2 February 2010 the engine room caught fire upon leaving Falmouth, Cornwall where the ship had undergone its annual refit. No one was injured and the fire was extinguished, but the ship returned to Falmouth so a full investigation and repairs could be carried out. Sailings resumed on 6 March 2010 but the service was delayed by operational problem. The Ferry sailed from Cherbourg to Rosslare on Sunday morning 7 March 2010.

=== GNV Allegra ===
In May 2019 the ferry was renamed GNV Allegra. She was operated by the Grandi Navi Veloci on the route Genoa – Olbia.

In late summer 2020 GNV Allegra was one of five ships, rented by the state of Italy to house migrants who had landed in larger numbers on the island of Lampedusa and others, who had been brought to Italy by the Sea-Watch NGO.

== Name ==
MS Oscar Wilde was named after the Irish poet and playwright Oscar Wilde.
