= Color Hybrid =

Hybrid ferry of the Color Line

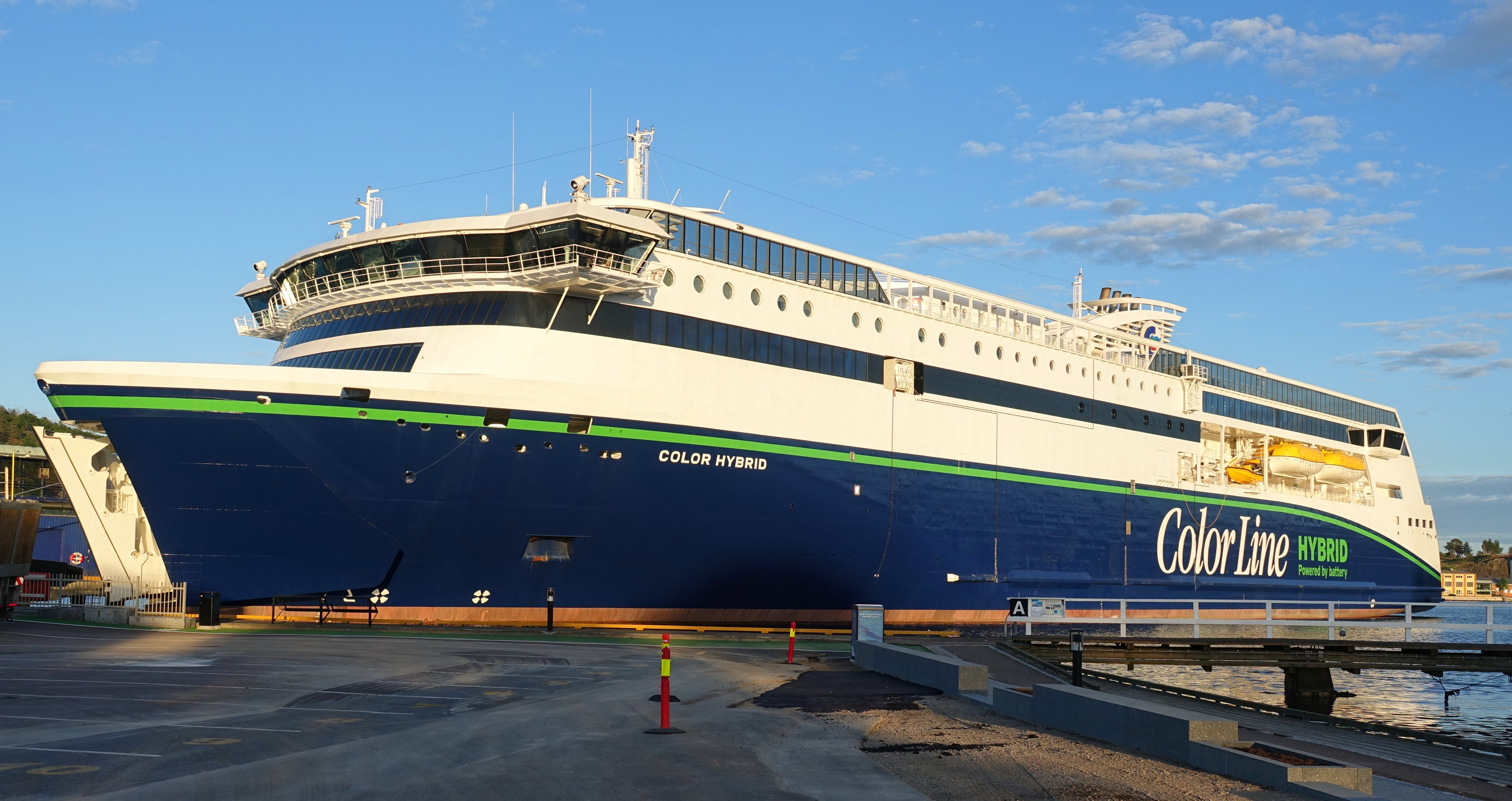
- Color Hybrid

History
- Name: Color Hybrid
- Owner: Color Line
- Port of registry: Norway
- Route: Sandefjord–Strömstad
- Ordered: 2017
- Builder: Ulstein Verft
- Yard number: 311
- Christened: 23 August 2019
- Completed: 2019
- In service: 16 August 2019
- Identification: IMO number: 9824289

General characteristics
- Class & type: Cruiseferry
- Tonnage: 27,000 GT; 3,258 DWT
- Length: 160 m (520 ft)
- Draught: 6m
- Installed power: 4x Rolls-Royce Bergen B33:45L diesels + Electric
- Speed: 17kn
- Capacity: 2,000 passengers; 500 vehicles

Color Hybrid is a cruiseferry owned and operated by Color Line on their route between Sandefjord in Norway and Strömstad in Sweden. She entered service in August 2019 and was the largest plug-in diesel-electric hybrid vessel in the world until 2024.

== History ==
Color Line signed a letter of intent with Norwegian shipbuilder Ulstein Verft for the construction of Color Hybrid in January 2017. The order was confirmed the following month, and construction began with a steel-cutting ceremony on 14 July at the CRIST shipyard in Gdynia, Poland. On 16 April 2018, the ship's keel, built from 14 modules, was completed, with work in Poland to complete the hull continuing into October, when it was towed to Ulsteinvik for outfitting. In early November, Color Hybrid's hull reached the shipbuilding hall in Ulsteinvik, where construction continued until her delivery in mid-2019.

After the delivery to Color Line in 2019, Color Hybrid has replaced Bohus on the route between Sandefjord, Norway and Strömstad, Sweden. Her hybrid propulsion system allows her to operate under battery power in the coastal areas outside of Sandefjord. The total travel time is 2.5 hours, the batteries would allow up to one hour of electric travel.

== Design ==
Color Hybrid was built to a Fosen Yard design, and measures 160 metres (520 ft) long, with a capacity of up to 2,000 passengers and 500 vehicles, personnel on board is 100. When delivered, she will be the largest plug-in hybrid vessel in the world. She is powered primarily by four Bergen Marine B33:45L diesel engines driving, supplemented by 5 MWh Siemens batteries weighing 65t that can power the ship for up to an hour. The battery system is charged via shore power at Sandefjord and from on-board generators driven by the diesel engines.
