= Hybrid ferry =

Ferry that combines multiple sources of power

Hybrid ferries are ferries that combine multiple sources of power (for example, traditional diesel with electric battery power), resulting in reductions in fossil fuel consumption, carbon emissions and other pollutants.

== Examples ==
=== Scotland ===
Three hybrid roll-on/roll-off ferries are in operation on the west coast of Scotland. They were launched between December 2012 and December 2015.

=== California, United States ===
When changing to hybrid ferries to and from Alcatraz Island in California, the National Park Service has reduced carbon dioxide emissions by an estimated 700,000 pounds. It does so by drawing power from a photovoltaic system that uses 959 photovoltaic panels that are located on the cell house roof power on the island. The ferry has its own photovoltaic panel and wind turbine on top that helps power the vessel.

=== British Columbia, Canada ===
BC Ferries currently operates 6 hybrid electric car ferries. It is currently building 4 more of the same class, and plans to build 5 major hybrid electric ferries by 2030.

=== Washington, United States ===
Washington State Ferries plans to introduce 22 diesel-electric ferries by 2040, cutting its annual diesel use from 19 to 9.5 million gallons.

=== New York, United States ===
The New York Hornblower is powered by diesel, hydrogen fuel cells, AGM batteries, and wind and solar energy. The ferry is designed to carry 600 passengers with an operating speed at 12 knots. It operates a round trip between Battery Park, Ellis Island, and Liberty Island, also functioning as a harbor tour boat and a dinner cruise boat.

=== Germany and Denmark ===
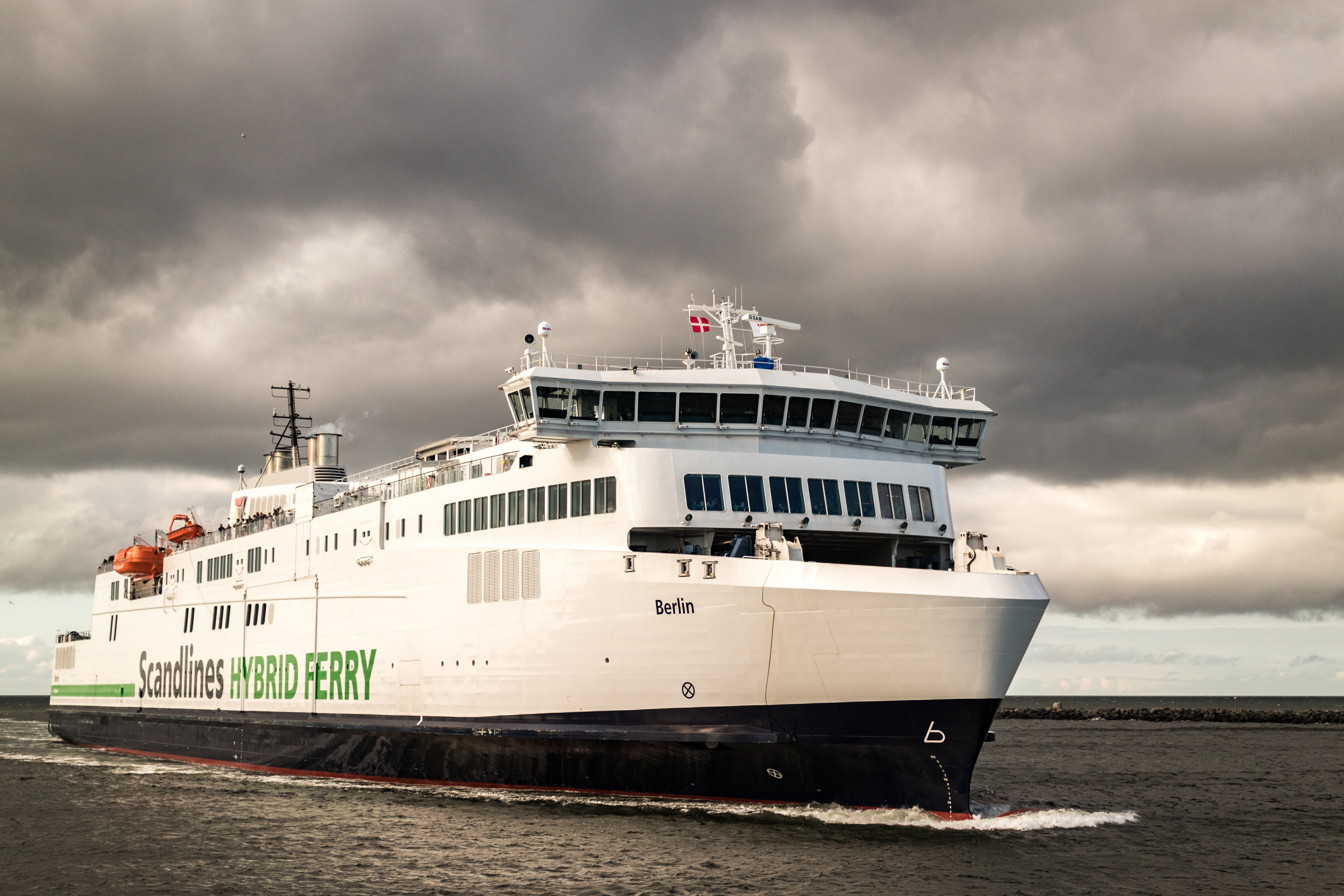
The Scandlines Berlin hybrid ferry

The Danish ferry operator Scandlines operates 6 hybrid ferries as of 2021. In 2019, they installed a rotor sail onto their existing hybrid passenger ship M/V Copenhagen which operates on the Rostock-Gedser route between Germany and Denmark.

Name	Commissioned	Tonnage	Passengers	Battery energy capacity in MWh
Stena Jutlandica	1996	29,691	1,500	1
Berlin, & Copenhagen (each)	2016	22,319	1,300	1.5
Color Hybrid	2019		2,000	4.7
	2018			

=== England ===
- Victoria of Wight sails between Portsmouth and Fishbourne and is owned by Wightlink
- Earth Clipper - operates on the Thames in London and runs just on batteries whilst in the "Clear air zone"

== See also ==
- Electric ferry
