= MS Prinsesse Ragnhild =

Cruise ship

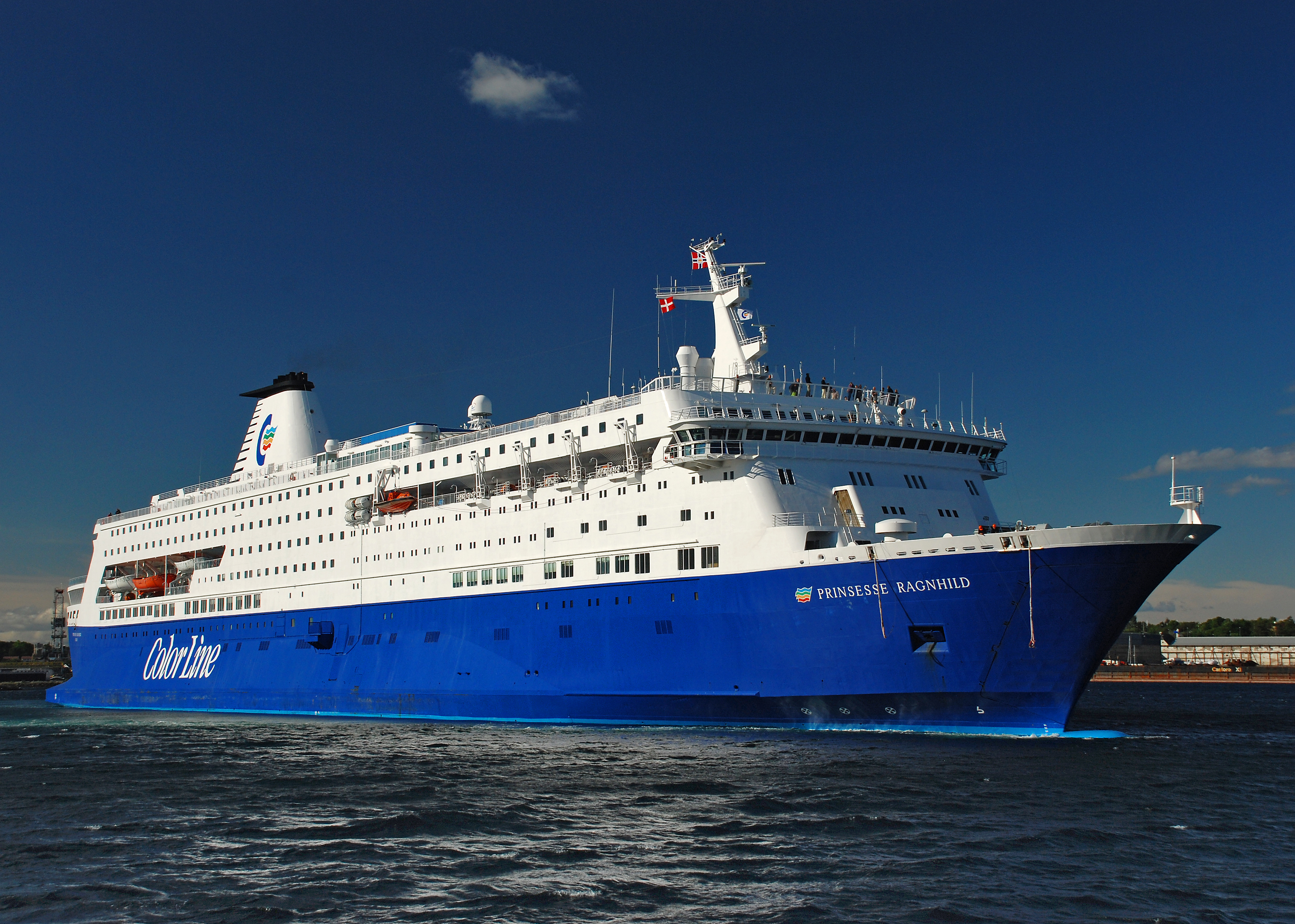
- Bahamas Celebration as Prinsesse Ragnhild

History
- Name: 1981–2008: Prinsesse Ragnhild; 2008–2015: Bahamas Celebration; 2015: Celebration
- Owner: 1981–1990: Jahre Line; 1990–2008: Color Line; 2008–2014: Celebration Cruise Holdings
- Operator: 1981–1990: Jahre Line; 1990–2008: Color Line; 2009–2014: Celebration Cruise Line; Manager: International Shipping Partners
- Port of registry: 1981–1990: Sandefjord, Norway; 1990–2008: Oslo, Norway; 2008–2014: Nassau, Bahamas
- Builder: HDW, Kiel, West Germany
- Yard number: 164
- Laid down: 29 February 1980
- Launched: 31 July 1980
- Completed: 30 January 1982
- Maiden voyage: 1981
- In service: 1981
- Out of service: 31 October 2014
- Identification: IMO number: 7904891
- Fate: Scrapped in Alang, India, 2015

General characteristics (as built, 1980)
- Type: Cruiseferry
- Tonnage: 16,631 GRT; 3,210 DWT
- Length: 170 m (557 ft 9 in)
- Beam: 24 m (78 ft 9 in)
- Draught: 5.80 m (19 ft 0 in)
- Ice class: 1B 0
- Installed power: 2 × Stork-Werkspoor 20TM410; 18,600 kW (combined); 6 × Stork-Werkspoor 9F240 gensets 8,000 kW (combined)
- Propulsion: 2 controllable pitch propellers
- Speed: 21 knots (39 km/h; 24 mph)
- Capacity: 892 passengers; 892 passenger berths; 603 cars

General characteristics (as rebuilt, 1992)
- Tonnage: 35,483 GT; 19,854 NT; 3,210 DWT
- Length: 205.25 m (673 ft 5 in)
- Beam: 24 m (78 ft 9 in)
- Draught: 6 m (19 ft 8 in)
- Depth: 13 m (42 ft 8 in)
- Ice class: 1B
- Installed power: 4 × Stork-Wärtsilä 9FEDH240 diesels; 2 × Stork-Wärtsilä 9FEDH240G; 36,356 kW (combined)
- Propulsion: Two controllable pitch propellers
- Capacity: 1,900 passengers; 1,875 passenger berths; 700 cars
- Notes: Otherwise the same as built

MS Prinsesse Ragnhild was a cruiseferry formerly operated by Celebration Cruise Line. Between March 2009 and October 2014, she operated two- and three-day cruises as MS Bahamas Celebration from Port Everglades to the Bahamas. In March 2010 she started operating two-day cruises from the Port of Palm Beach.

The ship was built in 1981 by Howaldtswerke-Deutsche Werft (HDW) in Kiel, Germany for Jahre Line. In 1990 she was transferred to Color Line. In 1992 she was extensively rebuilt at Astilleros Españoles in Cádiz, Spain. She was withdrawn from service with Color Line on 6 May 2008. She was irreparably damaged after a collision with a submerged object on 31 October 2014 and replaced by Grand Celebration.

== Service history ==
=== Prinsesse Ragnhild ===
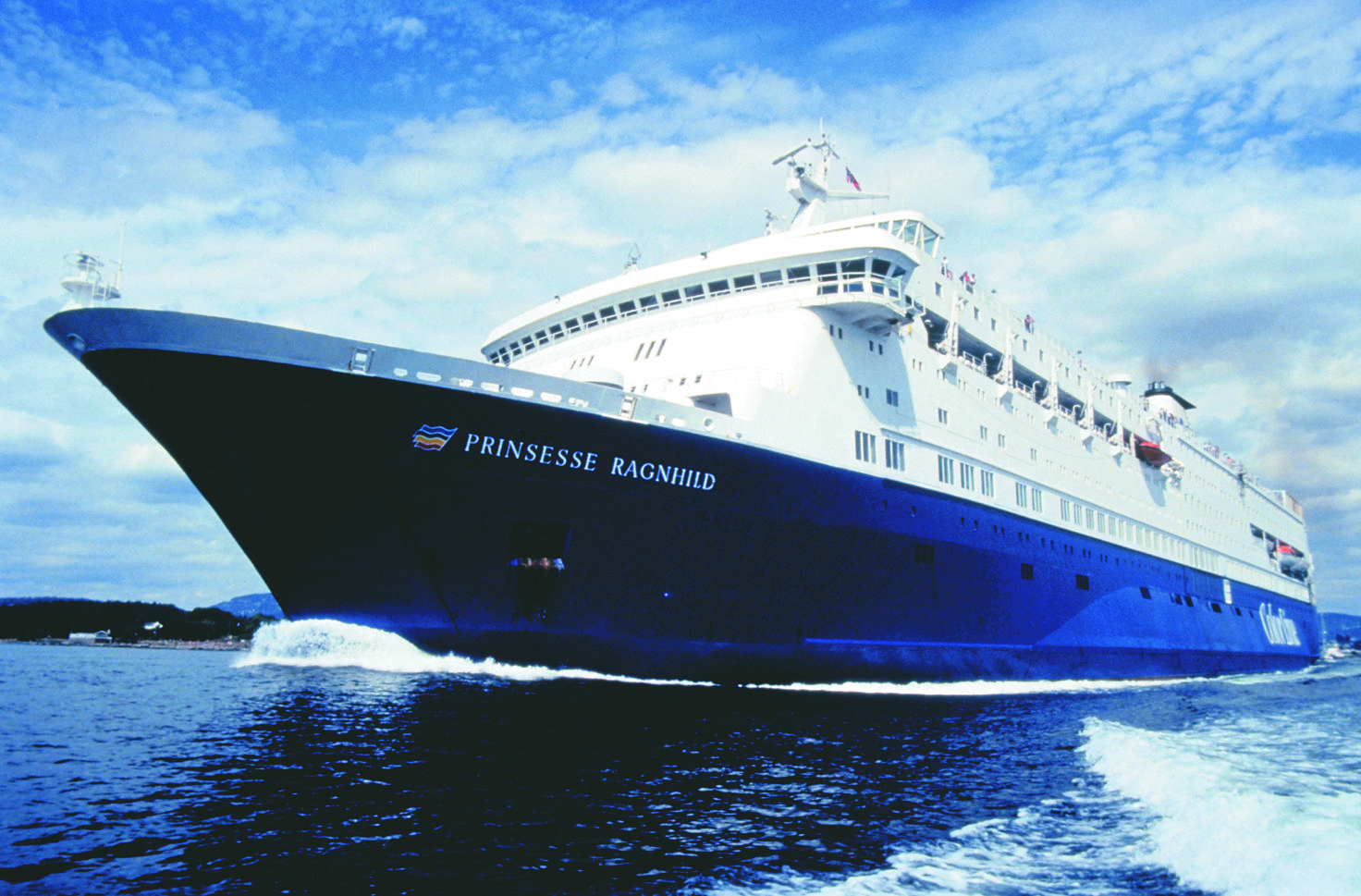
MS Prinsesse Ragnhild

From 1981 to 2004, Prinsesse Ragnhild operated on the Oslo to Kiel route, first for Jahre Line and, from 1990 onwards, for their successor Color Line. In 1992 she was radically rebuilt at Astilleros Españoles, Cádiz, increasing her length by 35.25 meters and passenger capacity by 858.

On 8 July 1999, there was a fire in the engine room, resulting in a complete evacuation of the ship. With Scandinavian Star disaster fresh in mind, a full emergency was called and all ships in the area came to the rescue. Helicopters and firecrews from Norway, Sweden, and Denmark all participated in the rescue effort, and the evacuation was described by most passengers as "controlled". However, one woman died after the fire as a result of a heart attack. After repairs at Blohm & Voss in Hamburg, Germany, the ship resumed operations on the third of September. On 1 March 2002, the ship suffered another engine room fire, which was quickly extinguished.

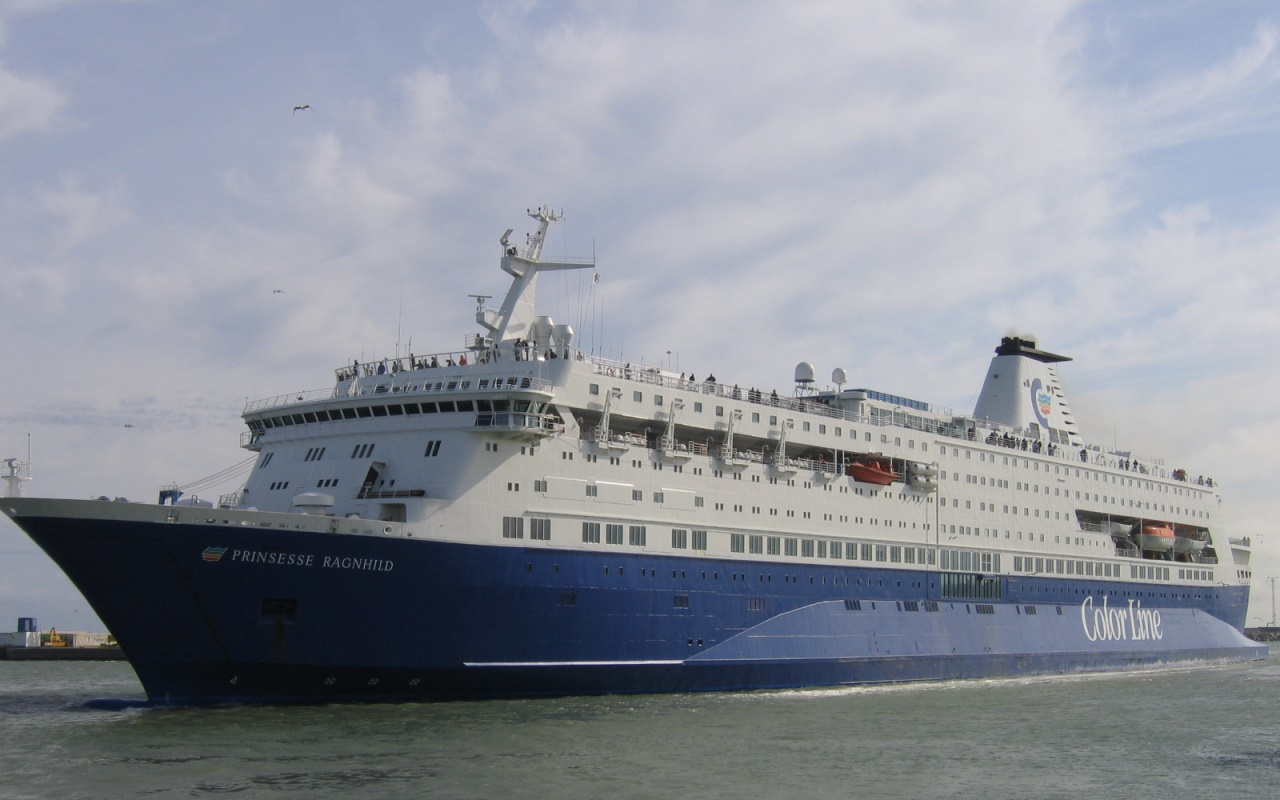
Prinsesse Ragnhild in July 2005

In 2003 the Color Line spent sixty million Norwegian kroner to upgrade the onboard interior. In 2005 the ship was replaced by the new Color Fantasy on the Oslo—Kiel route and was transferred to a new Bergen—Stavanger—Hirtshals route. On 8 January 2008 Prinsesse Ranghild was moved to the Oslo–Hirtshals route, replacing Color Festival, which was sold to Corsica Ferries. In April 2008, Color Line announced that due to "negative financial development" in the service, the Oslo—Hirtshals route was to be closed on 6 May 2008, and Prinsesse Ragnhild was placed for sale. Following closure of the route, the Prinsesse Ragnhild was laid up at Sandefjord.

On 3 September 2008, Color Line reported that Prinsesse Ragnhild had been sold to Celebration Cruise Holdings for twenty-three million euro. The ship was delivered to her new owners on 1 October 2008, renamed Bahamas Celebration, and left Sandefjord on the same date for Grand Bahama Island.

=== Listing and scrapping ===
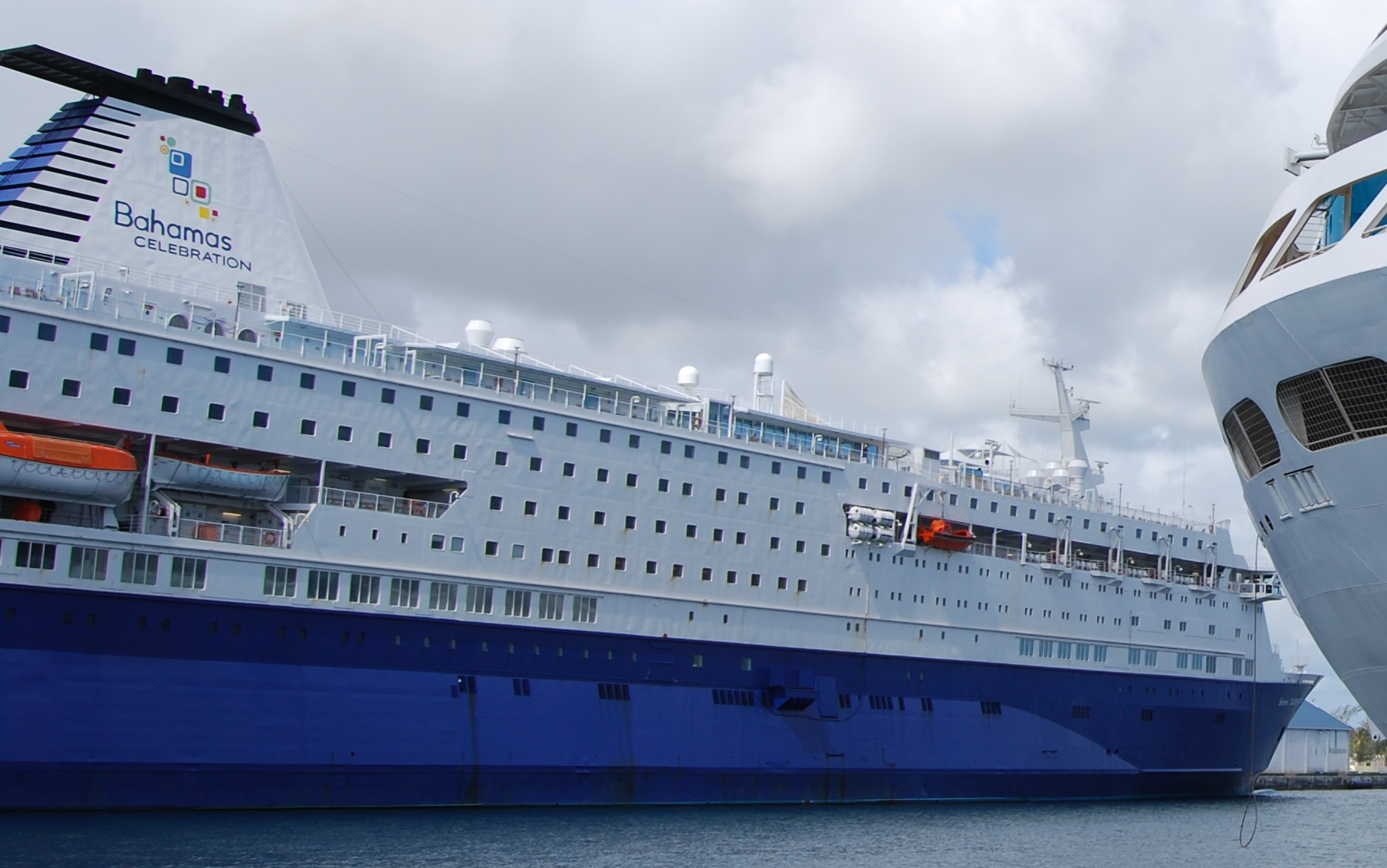
Bahamas Celebration in Nassau, Bahamas on 12 May 2009

On 31 October 2014, Bahamas Celebration struck an unknown object while departing from Freeport, opening up a small hole in the port side. The ship was able to return to the port and all passengers and crew were able to disembark and no injuries were reported. As of 3 November 2014, the hole had been patched, but the ship was still listing by about 10 degrees and salvage crews were trying to assess the damage.

In December 2014 it was announced that the ship could not be repaired and would be replaced by Grand Celebration, which would be operated by the newly formed Bahamas Paradise Cruise Line. On 24 January 2015 it was announced by Bahamas Paradise Cruise Line that the ship has been sold for scrap. The ship arrived at the scrapping yard on 29 October and was gone by the end of 2016.
