= Jahre Line =

Norwegian cruiseferry line

Jahre Line was a cruiseferry line operating on routes to and from Norway between 1961 and 1990. In 1990, it merged with Norway Line to form Color Line.

The following ships were part of Jahre Line's fleet:

- MT Jacinth (1949-1963)
- MS Kronprins Harald (1) (1961-1975)
- MS Prinsesse Ragnhild (1) (1966-1980)
- MS Wesertal (1973, chartered)
- MS Kronprins Harald (2) (1976-1987)
- MS Suffolk (1977, chartered)
- MS Janina (1980-1981)
- MS Prinsesse Ragnhild (2) (1981-1991)
- MS Jalina (1985-1987, chartered)
- MS Kronprins Harald (3) (1987-1991)
