= Color Line (ferry operator) =

Norwegian ferry operator

Color Line AS
- Predecessor: Jahre Line and Norway Line
- Founded: 1990
- Headquarters: Oslo, Norway
- Area served: Norway, Denmark, Germany, Sweden
- Key people: Morten Garman, Chairman; Olav Nils Sunde, President
- Services: Passenger transportation Freight transportation
- Parent: Color Group
- Website: www.colorline.no

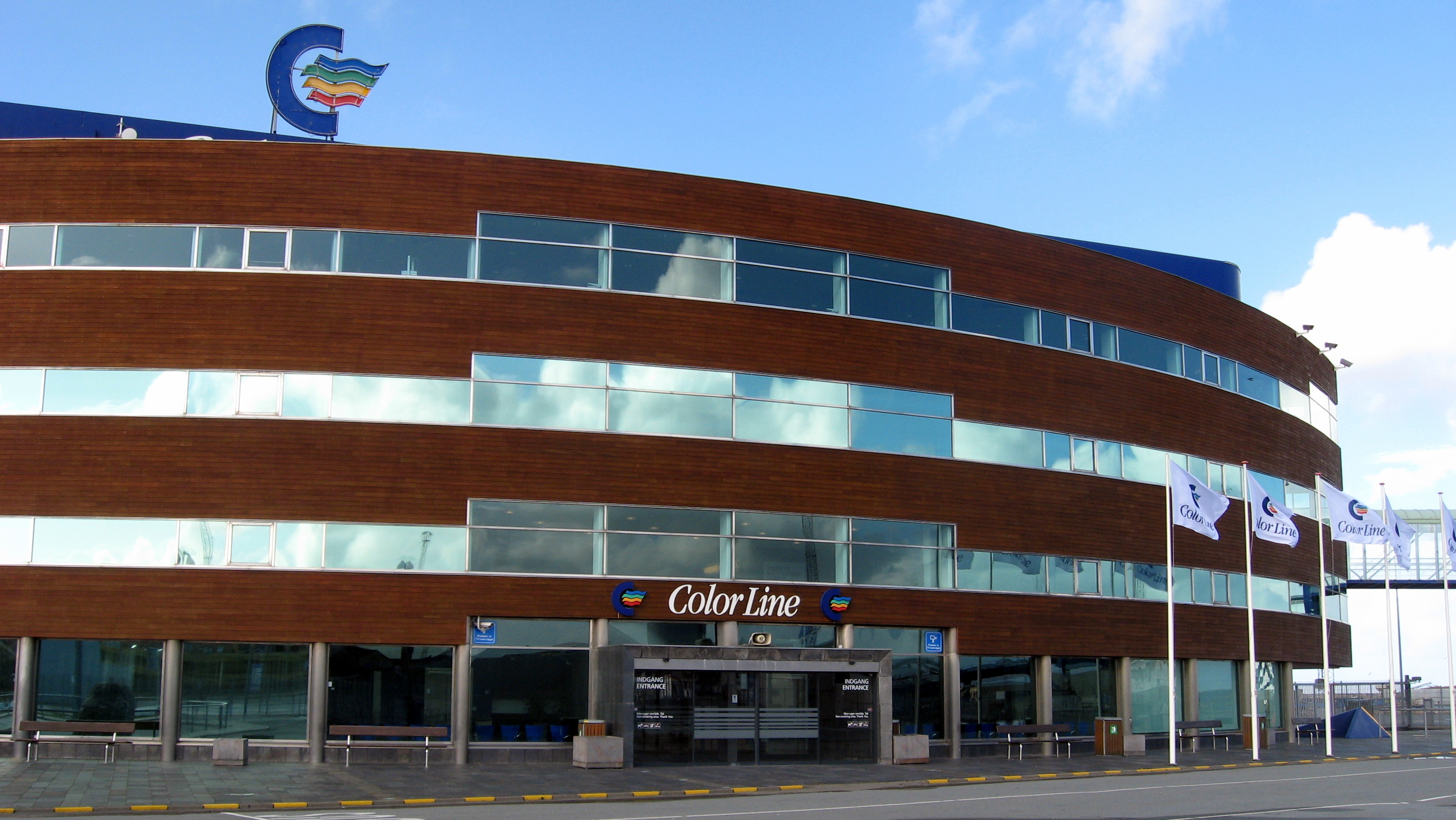
Color Line terminal in Hirtshals

Color Line AS is a Norwegian shipping company that is the largest cruiseferry line operating on routes to and from Norway. The company is also one of the leading operators in Europe. Color Line provides transportation for people and cargo, hotel accommodation, shopping, restaurants and entertainment. The company currently employs 3500 people in four countries.

Color Line's main office is in Oslo, but the company also has Norwegian offices in Kristiansand, Sandefjord and Larvik, in addition to international offices in Kiel, Hirtshals and Strömstad.

== History ==
Color Line has roots in the ferry business that go back more than 100 years. The company was established in 1990 when two Norwegian shipping companies, Jahre Line and Norway Line merged. Jahre Line had operated ferries between Oslo and Kiel since 1961, while Norway Line had operated ferries between Bergen and Newcastle since 1986. During 1990 Color Line also took over the Fred. Olsen Lines cruiseferry operations, thereby expanding the traffic area of the new company to Norway–Denmark routes.

During the first half of the 1990s Color Line expanded its tonnage by lengthening its existing ships or by acquisition of larger second-hand ships. The company began operating fast ferries between Norway and Denmark during the summer of 1996. Initially the operations were in collaboration with SeaContainers, but were run without them from 1997 onwards. In October of the same year Color Line took over the operations of Larvik Line, its competitor in the Norway—Denmark traffic. In September 1998 Color Line acquired both the Color Hotel Skagen and Scandi Line, which operated two ferries on the short routes connecting Norway and Sweden. In the end of 1998 the Norway–United Kingdom operations were sold to Fjord Line. For the 1999 summer season the (former) Scandi Line ships received new Color Scandi Line liveries. They were fully incorporated into the Color Line fleet in 2001.

During the 2000s Color Line begun investing heavily in new tonnage, with MS Color Fantasy, MS Color Magic, MS Superspeed 1 and MS Superspeed 2 supplanting much of the older tonnage between 2004 and 2008. In April 2008 the company announced the closure of the Oslo—Hirtshals service from 6 May 2008 onwards.

In January 2017, Color Line announced that it had signed a letter of intent with the Ulstein Verft shipyard to build a new ferry with a hybrid drivetrain for the Sandefjord–Strömstad route, with delivery expected in 2019. The keel was laid in April 2018 in Poland and the ship was launched in November 2018.

In November 2022, Color Line announced that Color Carrier and Color Viking will end operations.

In 2026, Stena Line agreed to purchase Color Line.

== Ships and routes ==
Ferry routes operated by Color Line

Ship	Built	Entered service	Route	Tonnage^{1}	Flag	Notes
MS Color Fantasy	2004	2004	Oslo–Kiel	75,027 GT	Norway	
MS Color Magic	2007	2007	Oslo–Kiel	75,100 GT	Norway	Largest cruiseferry in the world.
MS Superspeed 1	2008	2008	Kristiansand–Hirtshals	33,500 GT	Norway	
MS Superspeed 2	2008	2008	Larvik–Hirtshals	33,500 GT	Norway	
MS Color Hybrid	2019	2019	Sandefjord–Strömstad	27,000 GT	Norway	

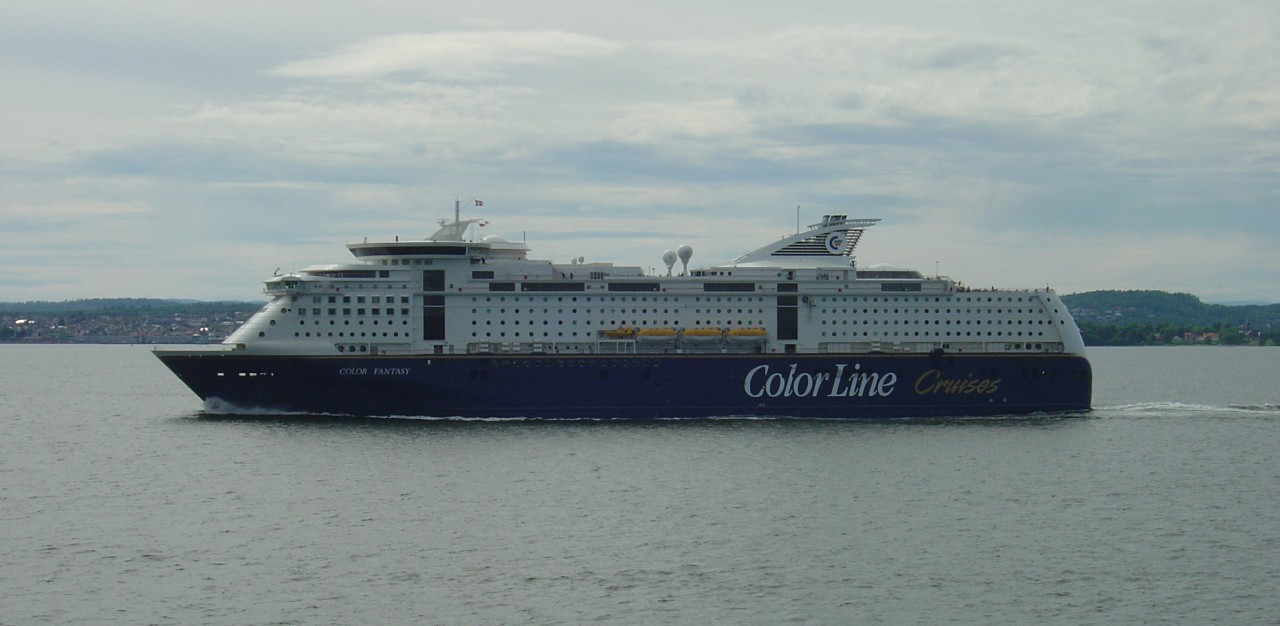
MS Color Fantasy

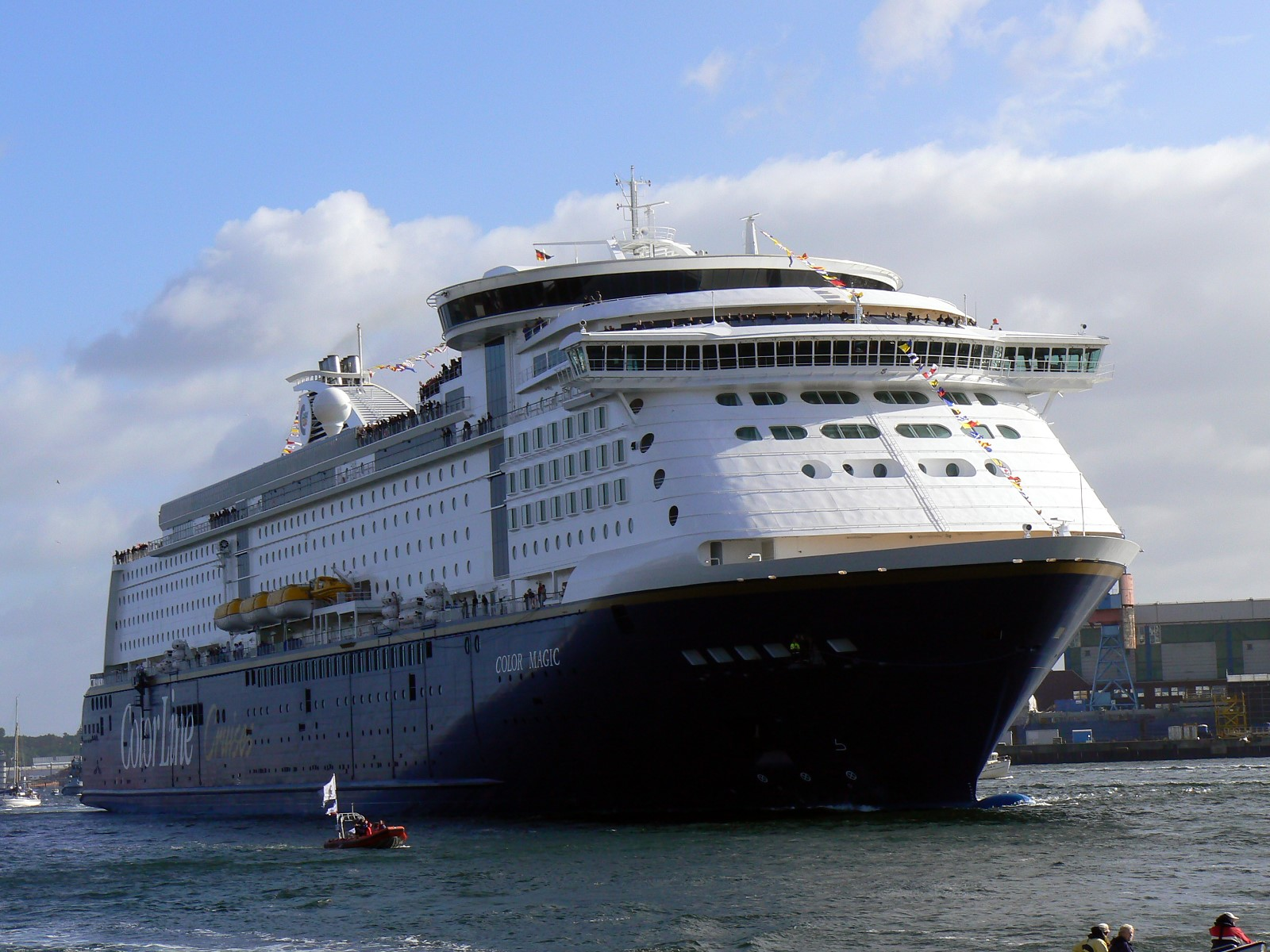
MS Color Magic, the largest cruiseferry with cardeck in the world

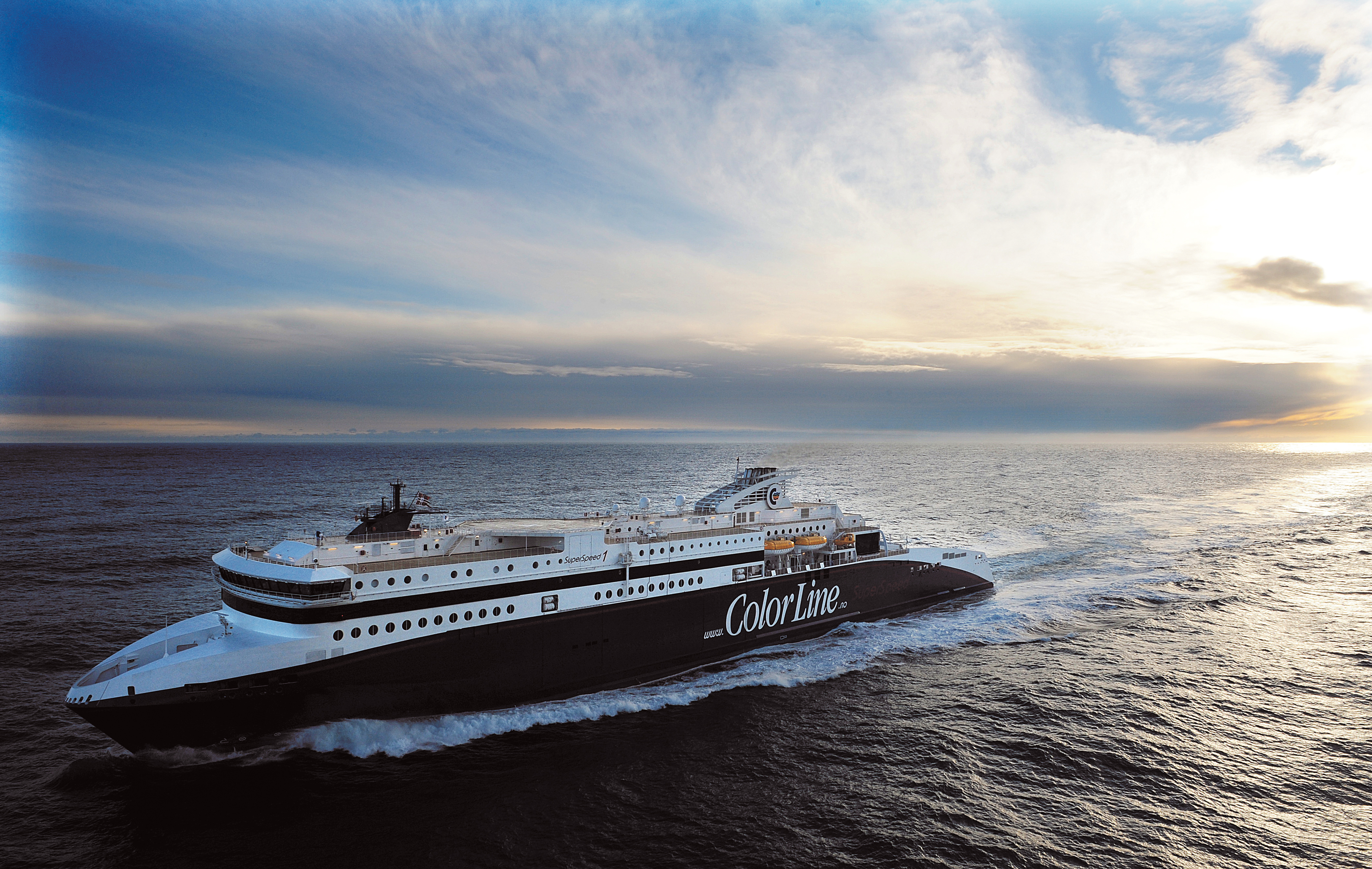
MS Superspeed 1 on the route Kristiansand – Hirtshals

=== Former ships ===
Ship	Built	Years in service	Tonnage^{1}	Status as of 2022
MS Color Viking	1985	2000–2022	19,763 GT	Sold to Seajets in 2022 and renamed SuperStar II in 2023.
MS Kronprins Harald	1987	1991–2007	31,122 GT	From 2019 GNV Allegra for Grandi Navi Veloci.
MS Prinsesse Ragnhild	1980	1991–2008	16,631 GRT 35,483 GT	From 2008 Bahamas Celebration. Sold for scrap, Alang India, 2015.
MS Jupiter	1973	1991–1999	11,344 GRT	Scrapped as Crown in 2008.
MS Skagen	1975	1991–2005	12,333 GRT	Scrapped 2011, Alang India.
Venus	1974	1991–1994	8,753 GRT	From 2002 Cesme for Turkish Marmara Lines.
MS Christian IV	1982	1991–2008	21,699 GT	From 2018 Moby Zaza for Moby Lines.
MS Color Viking	1975	1994–1998	11,344 GRT 20,581 GT	Sold to Royal Group Ltd, later lost.
MS Color Festival	1985	1994–2008	34,694 GT	From 2008 Mega Smeralda for Corsica Ferries.
HSC SeaCat Danmark	1991	1996	3,003 GT	Sold 2006 as HSC Pescara Jet for SNAV.
HSC SeaCat Norge	1991	1996	3,003 GT	Sold 2007 as Snaefell for Isle of Man Steam Packet Company.
Octagon 3	1984	1996–1997	10,243 GT	From 2005 Fast Independence for Independence Shipping.
MS Peter Wessel	1981	1996–2008	14,919 GRT 29,706 GT	From 2008 GNV Azzurra for Grandi Navi Veloci.
HSC Silvia Ana L	1996	1997–2007	7,895 GT	From 2007 sailing for Buquebus.
Pegasus Two	1997	1997–1998	3,971 GT	From 2007 HSC Queen Nefertiti for Arab Bridge Maritime.
Color Trader	1977	1998	8,454 GRT	Scrapped 2004.
Feederman	1972	1998	3,166 GRT	From 2003 Dorrah Jeddah for an unidentified Saudi Arabian company.
Sandefjord	1965	1999–2000	5,678 GRT	Scrapped as Star N in 2023.
MS Bohus	1971	1999–2019	9,149 GT	Sold in 2019 and operating as Ionian Star.
Landi	1976	1999	9,079 GRT	From 2007 Ammari for Ustica Lines.
MS European Mariner	1978	2002	1,598 GRT	Sold 2003 to P&O Ferries.
Gute	1979	2003	7,616 GRT	From 2007 laid up in Visby, owned by Rederi AB Gotland.
Calibur	1976	2003	3,642 GRT	From 2007 sailing for P&O Ferries.
Color Traveller	1981	2004–2006	17,046 GT	From 2007 Rostock for Scandlines.
^{1}May be specified in gross tonnage (GT) or gross register tons (GRT) if built before 1982.
