= Color Magic =

Cruise ferry built in 2007

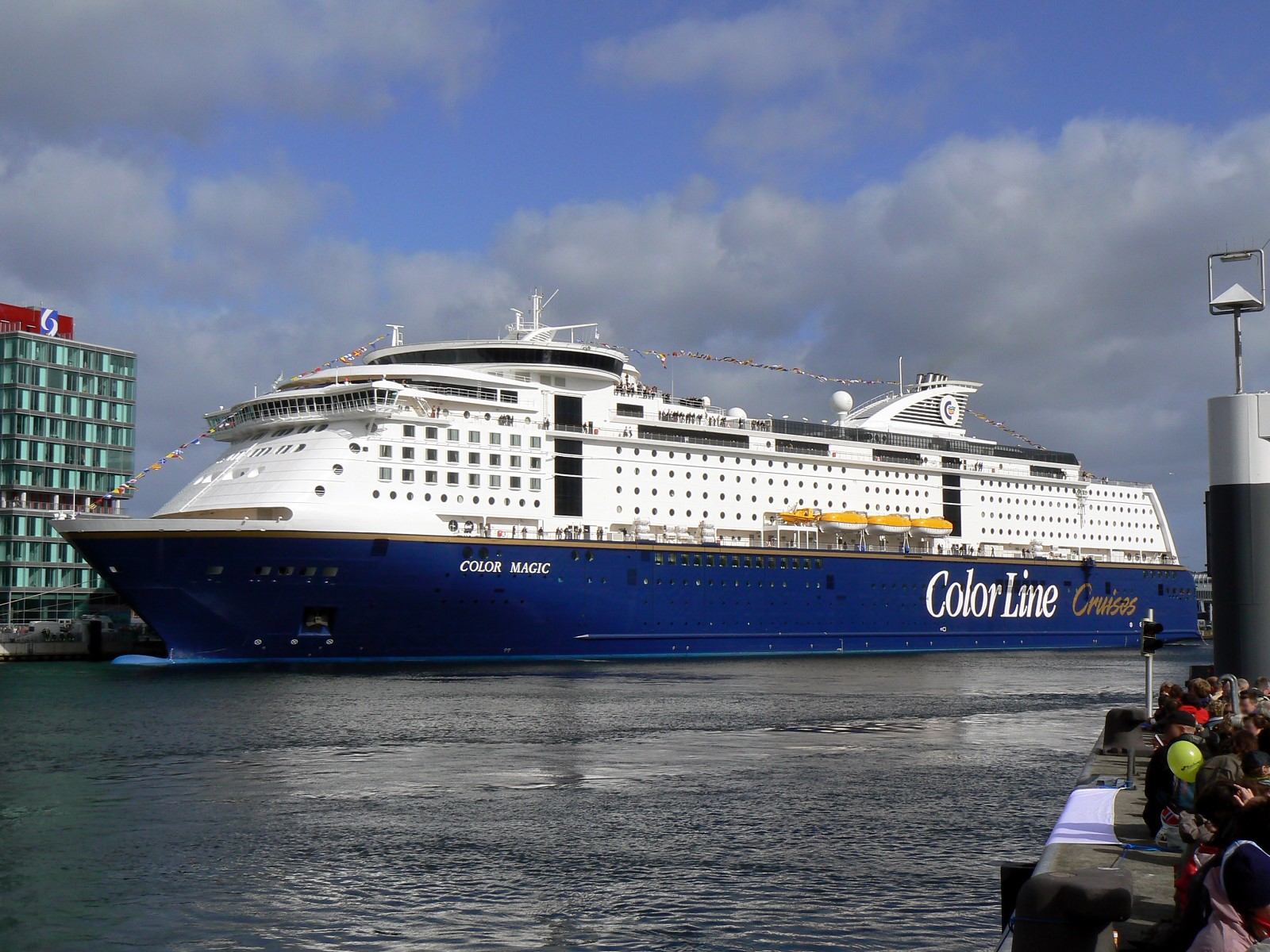
- Color Magic in Kiel in 2007

History
- Name: Color Magic
- Owner: Color Line
- Port of registry: Oslo, Norway
- Ordered: 27 May 2005
- Builder: Aker Finnyards Turku Shipyard, Finland (hull); Aker Finnyards Rauma Shipyard, Finland (outfitting)
- Yard number: 1355
- Laid down: 8 August 2006
- Launched: 15 December 2006
- Christened: 15 September 2007
- Acquired: 6 September 2007
- In service: 17 September 2007
- Identification: IMO number: 9349863

General characteristics
- Tonnage: 75,100 GT; 4,750 DWT
- Length: 224 m (734 ft)
- Beam: 35 m (115 ft)
- Draught: 6.80 m (22.3 ft)
- Propulsion: 4 × Wärtsilä 8L46B; 31,200 kW (combined)
- Speed: 22 knots (41 km/h; 25 mph)
- Capacity: 2,600 passengers; 2,975 passenger beds; 1,016 cabins; 550 cars; 1,270 lanemeters
- Notes: Sister ship to Color Fantasy

Color Magic is a cruiseferry owned and operated by the Norway-based shipping company Color Line on its route connecting Oslo, Norway, with Kiel, Germany. She was built at Aker Finnyards Rauma Shipyard, Finland, in 2007 and has been the largest ferry in the world ever since.

Color Magic is a sister vessel of the Color Fantasy, delivered to Color Line in 2004. The ship has over 1000 cabins and 54 suites. Unlike her sister, Color Fantasy was built in Turku. Color Magic has 89 more cabins than Color Fantasy, as well as larger conference facilities, making her slightly larger in terms of gross tonnage.

Preceded by Color Fantasy	World's Largest Cruiseferry; 2007–present	Succeeded by -
