= Color Fantasy =

Cruise ferry owned and operated by Color Line

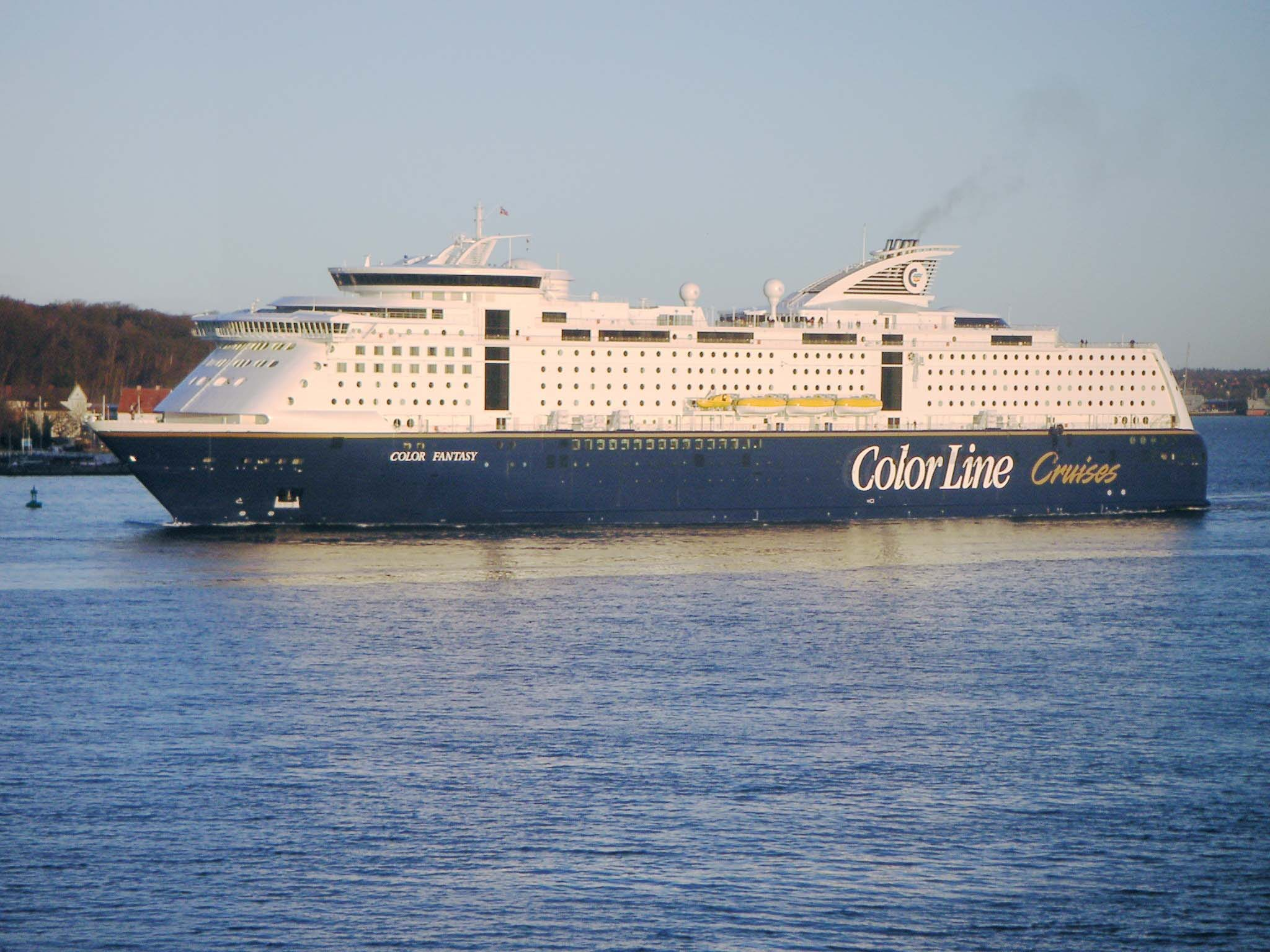
- Color Fantasy

History
- Name: Color Fantasy
- Owner: Color Line
- Port of registry: Oslo, Norway
- Route: Oslo—Kiel
- Builder: Aker Finnyards Turku Shipyard, Finland
- In service: 2004
- Identification: IMO number: 9278234

General characteristics
- Class & type: Cruiseferry
- Tonnage: 75,027 gross tonnage (GT)
- Length: 223.70 meters
- Beam: 35.00 meters
- Depth: 6.80 meters
- Ice class: 1 B
- Installed power: 4 × Wärtsilä 8L46 diesels; Combined 31200 kW
- Speed: 22 knots
- Capacity: Passengers; 2,750; 968 cabins; 2,799 passenger beds; Vehicles; 750 car capacity; 1,280 lanemeters
- Crew: 250; 248 crew cabins
- Notes: Sister ship is the Color Magic

Color Fantasy is a cruiseferry owned and operated by Color Line on their route between Oslo in Norway and Kiel in Germany. The ship was built in Finland at Aker Finnyards Turku Shipyard in 2004. Color Fantasy is currently the world's second largest cruiseferry, surpassed only by her sister ship, the Color Magic.

== Specification ==
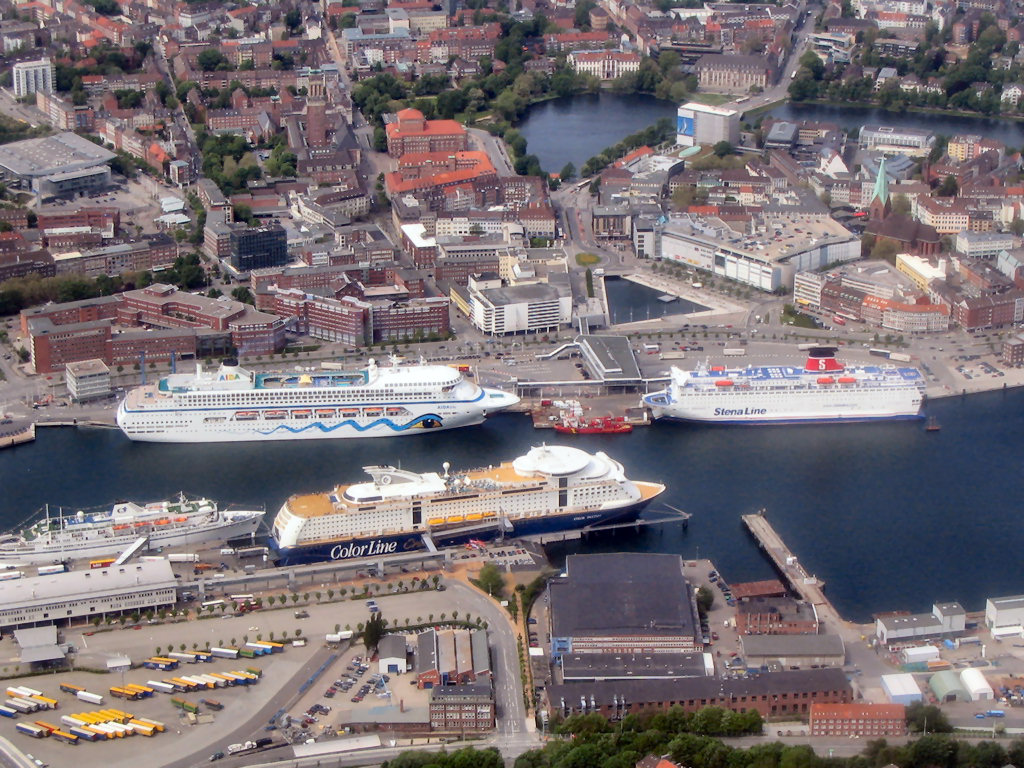
Air photo of Color Fantasy in Kiel

=== Main dimensions ===
- Length overall: 223.90 m
- Length btw.pp: 202.66 m
- Breadth, wl mld: 35.00 m
- Height to deck 3: 9.5/9.7 m
- Height to deck 7: 21.9 m
- Draught, design: 6.8 m
- Draught, scantlings: 7.0 m
- Deadweight: 5000 t
- Tonnage: estimate GT: 75,027
- Speed (90%MCR,15%SM) 22.1kn

=== Passengers and crew ===
- Number of Passengers: 2,750
- Number of Passengers Cabins: 968
- Cabins outside: 492
- Cabins atrium: 120
- Cabins inside: 356
- Number of Crew: 250
- Number of Crew cabins: 248

=== Main equipment and machinery ===
- Mechanical Propulsion Machinery: 4 x 7800 kW Diesel engines
- Propulsion power, about: 31200 kW
- Aux Power plant: 4 x 2450 kVA Diesel generators
- Main generator power: 9800 kVA, 690 V
- Shaft generators, manoeuvring only: 2 x 6000 kVA, 6600 V
- Emergency Diesel Generator Set: 900 kvA
- Bow Thrusters: 3 x 2200 kW, 6600 V
- Aft thrusters: 2x 1000 kW, 6600 V

=== Cargo ===
- Trailers, Deck 3: 1030 lm
- Trailers, Deck 2: 240 lm
- Total trailer lanemeters: 1270 lm
- Cars, Deck 5: 200 cars
- Cars, Deck 4: 258 cars
- Cars, Deck 3: 292 cars
- Car capacity: 750 cars

=== Class notation ===
- +1A1 ICE 1B, Carferry A, E0, NAUT-OC, RP, Clean, F-M, Comf-V(1)

== See also ==
- Largest ferries of Europe

Preceded by Pride of Rotterdam; Pride of Hull	World's Largest Cruiseferry; 2004–2007	Succeeded by Color Magic
