= Värtahamnen =

Port in Stockholm, Sweden

Coordinates: 59.351528°N 18.109158°E

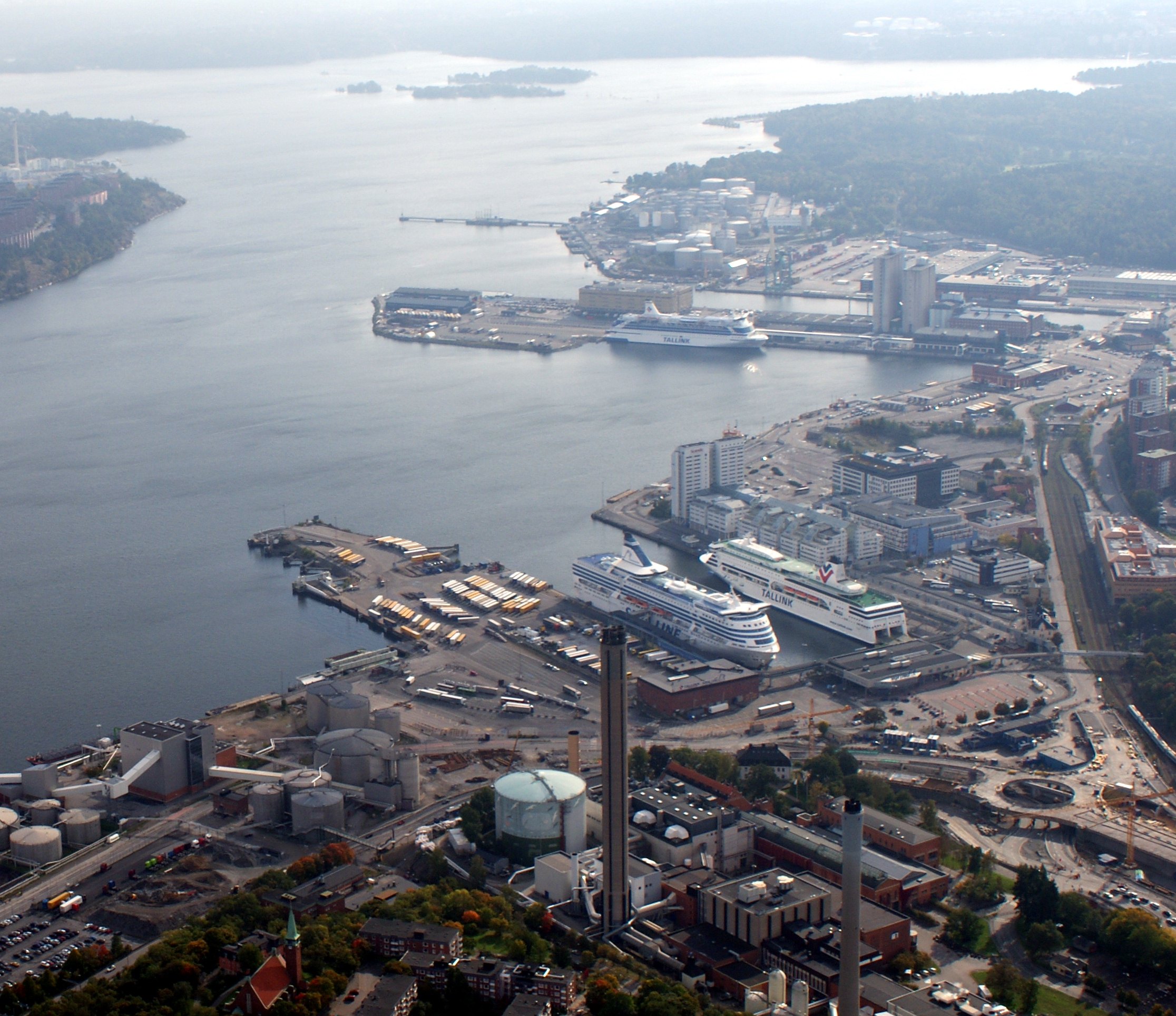
September 2012 aerial photograph of Värtahamnen.

Värtahamnen is a port in Stockholm, Sweden. Värtahamnen and the adjacent Stockholm Free Port at Lilla Värtan is Stockholm's main port. Värtahamnen primarily serves passenger ferries for the shipping company Silja Line as well as freighters for Tallink operating in Åland and Estonia. The port also services the SeaWind Line and the coal/biofuel power plant in Hjorthagen. Värtahamnen is located in the Gärdet and Hjorthagen districts. The structure was built in 1879-1886 after the city bought land in order to create a port for coal and other bulk goods. Rail freight and passenger traffic were routed through the Värtabanan line when the Värtan station was inaugurated in 1882. The port was widened and deepened gradually during the early 1900s, and in 1903 the nearby coal-fired Värtaverket plant was inaugurated. In 1904, a municipal building was added which served as the customs and port offices.

== Ships serving the terminal ==
| Company | Ship | Route | Notes |
|---|---|---|---|
| (Finland) Silja Line | MS Silja Serenade | Stockholm – Mariehamn – Helsinki | |
| (Finland) Silja Line | MS Silja Symphony | Stockholm – Mariehamn – Helsinki | |
| (Finland) Silja Line | MS Baltic Princess | Stockholm – Mariehamn/Långnäs – Turku | |
| (Estonia) Tallink | MS Baltic Queen | Stockholm – Mariehamn – Tallinn | |
