= Mega Smeralda =

Ship

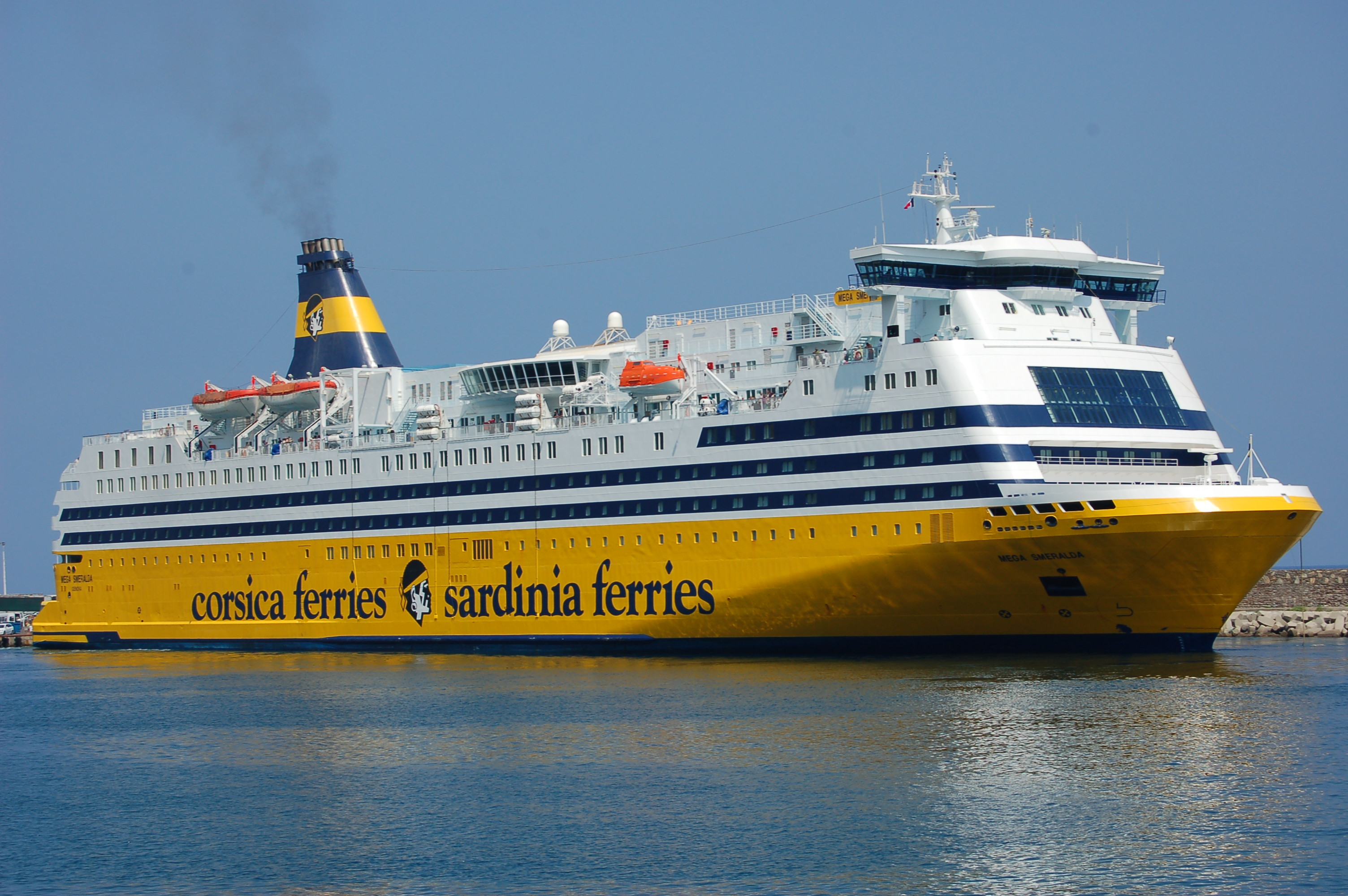
- Mega Smeralda at Bastia in July 2008

History
- Name: 1985–1992: Svea; 1992–1994: Silja Karneval; 1994–2008: Color Festival; 2008–present: Mega Smeralda
- Namesake: Rederi AB Svea (original name)
- Owner: 1985–1987: Johnson Line; 1987–1994: Svea Line (Finland); 1994–2008: Color Line; 2008–present: Medinvest
- Operator: 1985–1994: Silja Line; 1994–2008: Color Line; 2008–present: Corsica Ferries
- Builder: Wärtsilä Helsinki New Shipyard, Finland
- Yard number: 470
- Launched: 28 September 1984
- Sponsored by: Birgit Nilsson
- Christened: 28 September 1984
- Acquired: 7 May 1985
- In service: May 1985
- Refit: March–April 1992; December 2004–January 2005
- Home port: 1985–1994: Stockholm, Sweden; 1994–2008: Oslo, Norway; 2008–present: Genoa, (Italy)
- Identification: IMO number: 8306486
- Status: In service

General characteristics (as built)
- Tonnage: 33,829 GT; 4,150 DWT
- Length: 168.03 m (551.28 ft)
- Beam: 27.60 m (90.55 ft)
- Draught: 6.70 m (21.98 ft)
- Ice class: 1 A Super
- Installed power: 4 × Wärtsilä-Pielstick 12PC-6V diesels; combined 26,200 kW
- Speed: 22 knots (41 km/h; 25 mph)
- Capacity: 1,803 passengers; 1,625 passenger beds; 400 cars

General characteristics (currently)
- Tonnage: 34,694 GT
- Length: 168.45 m (552.66 ft)
- Capacity: 2,000 passengers; 1,933 passenger beds; 330 cars; 850 lanemeters

'Mega Smeralda is a cruiseferry owned by Medinvest and operated by Corsica Ferries - Sardinia Ferries. She was built in 1985 by Wärtsilä at the Helsinki New Shipyard in Helsinki, Finland, for Johnson Line as Svea for use in Silja Line traffic. Between 1992 and 1994, she sailed for Silja Line as Silja Karneval and, between 1994 and 2008, for Color Line as Color Festival.

== History ==
=== Silja Line service ===
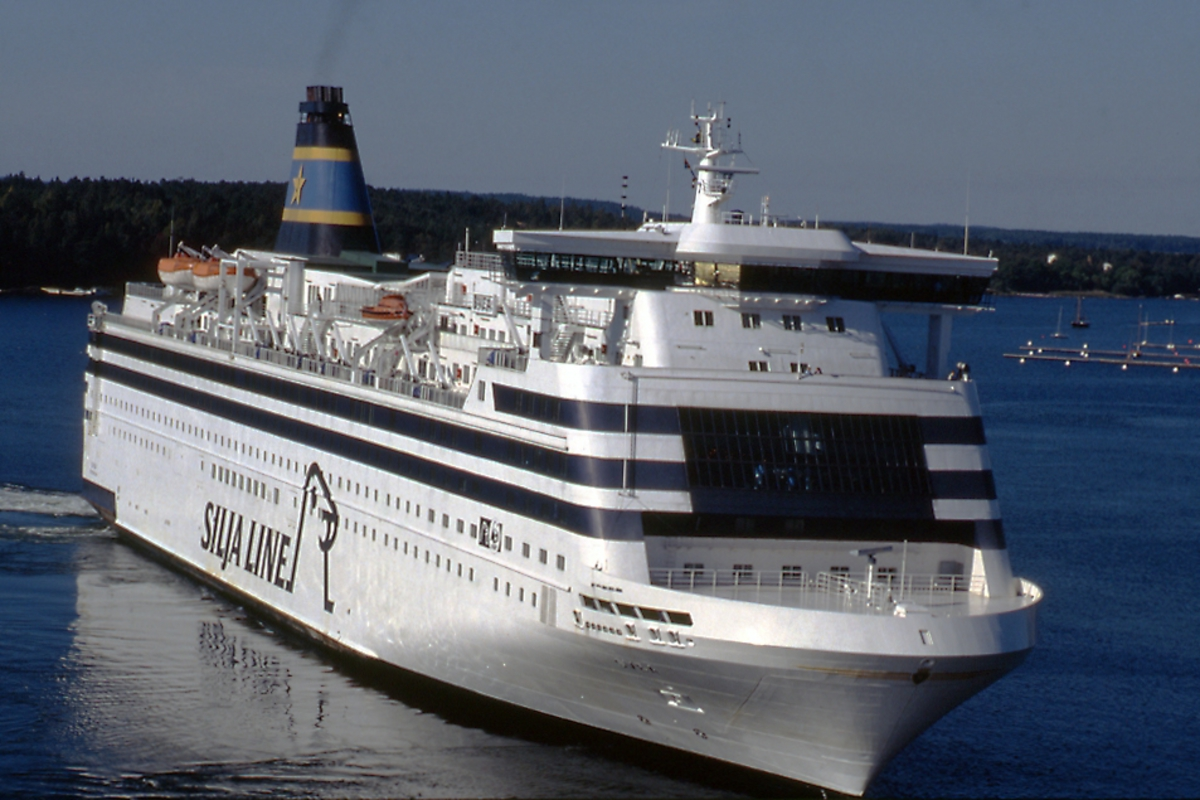
As Svea

Svea and her sister Wellamo were modeled after Silja Line's highly successful Helsinki–Stockholm service ferries Finlandia and Silvia Regina. Between the two classes, the aesthetic differences are the most notable; whilst the Finlandia and her sister followed a "form follows function" design philosophy resulting in a very boxy design for the ships, the new sisters for the Turku–Stockholm routing followed a more rounded and smoother, and overall much less hostile, design.

In 1989, there were plans to rebuild Svea with rails on the cardeck so that she could also carry railroad carriages on board, but these were shelved. Until 1990, her funnel displayed the colours of Johnson Line, but at that time Silja Line's owners Johnson Line and Effoa merged into one company, EffJohn, and Silja Line's seal logo was moved from the ship's hulls into their funnels.

In 1992, Svea and her sister underwent a large-scale reconstruction at Lloyd Werft in Bremerhaven, Germany, where most of the ships' interiors were rebuilt, a new "skybar" added on deck 9, a new more blue-dominated colour scheme replaced the traditional Silja stripes and the ship was renamed Silja Karneval in accordance with Silja's new name policy. In fact, the funds used to rebuild Svea and Wellamo were originally meant for the rebuilding of the GTS Finnjet, but her planned rebuilding would have been too expensive and EffJohn opted to spend what money they had on Svea and Wellamo instead.

=== Color Line service ===
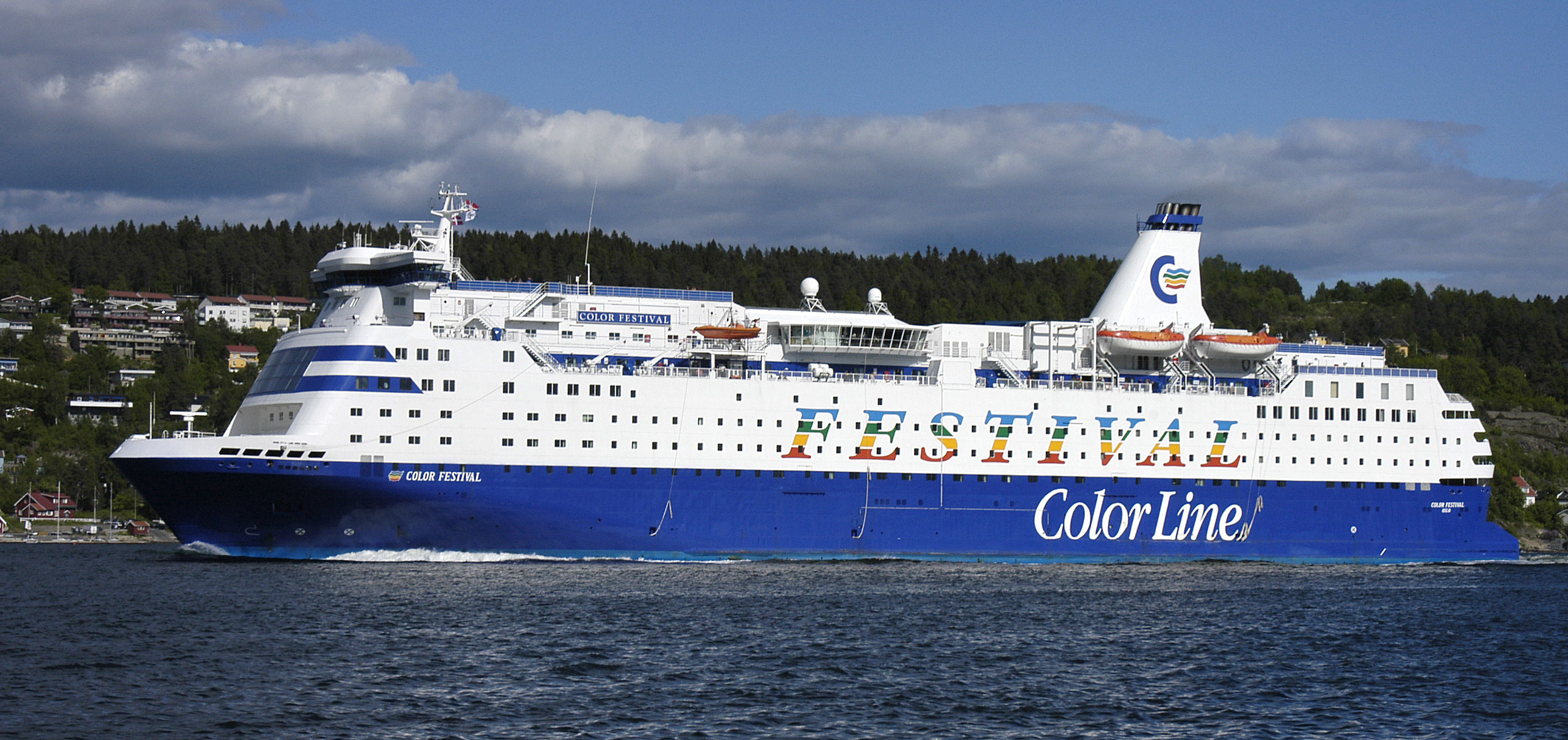
Color Festival at the Oslofjord

Silja Karneval's service with Silja proved to be short. In early 1994, EffJohn decided to sell her sister Silja Festival to the Norway-based Color Line. However, when time came to deliver the ship to Color Line, EffJohn for some reason decided to sell them Silja Karneval instead (the two ships being structurally identical). Problematically for Color Line, it had already printed material advertising its new ship as the Color Festival. As result Silja Karneval became M/S Color Festival, not Color Karneval as would have been logical.

After reconstruction at Cityvarvet, Gothenburg, Color Festival was initially placed on the Oslo–Hirtshals route. In 2002, one of her rudders was damaged in Hirsthals and she had to be docked in Hamburg because of it. In April 2006, she started operating on the Oslo–Frederikshavn route in direct competition with her old Silja Line fleetmate Stena Saga. On 21 November 2007, Color Line sold Color Festival to Corsica Ferries for €49 million (400 million Norwegian krone), in preparation for the delivery of the new Color Superspeed vessels in mid-2008.

=== Corsica Sardinia Ferries service ===
The Color Festival was delivered to Corsica Sardinia Ferries in early January 2008, subsequently renamed Mega Smeralda and re-flagged in Italy with Genoa as her homeport. Reportedly, she was to be placed on Civitavecchia – Golfo Aranci or Livorno – Golfo Aranci service. In 2011, the ferry operated between Toulon, Ajaccio, Bastia, Nice, etc..

It was withdrawn from service and laid up in the port of Genoa 3 March 2024.

== 2013 Tour de France ==
In June 2013, the Tour de France visited Corsica for the first time. To accommodate the Tour entourage, the organisers chartered the Mega Smeralda to house members of the organisation, media and others who worked on the Tour and to host press conferences, although the riders stayed in hotels in Porto-Vecchio.

Preceded by Scandinavia	World's Largest Cruiseferry; 1985	Succeeded by Mariella
