= MS Galaxy =

2006 ferry

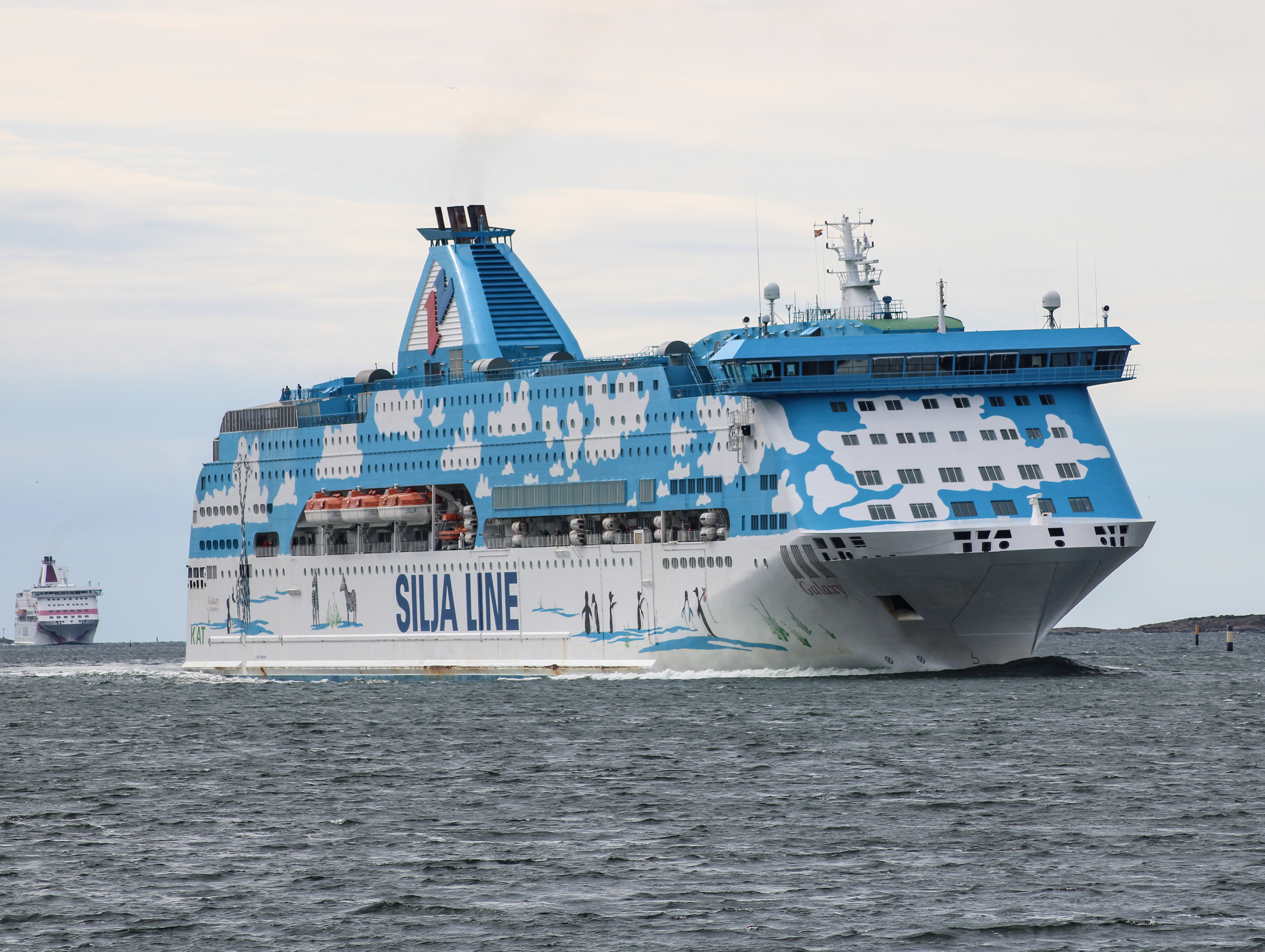
- MS Galaxy 1 as Galaxy

History

Latvia
- Name: 2006-2023: Galaxy 2023-present Galaxy 1
- Owner: Tallink Group
- Operator: 2006–08: Tallink; 2008–22: Silja Line
- Port of registry: 2006–08: Tallinn, Estonia; 2008–22: Stockholm, Sweden; 2023 onwards: Riga, Latvia
- Route: 2006–08: Tallinn–Helsinki; 2008–22: Stockholm–Mariehamn/Långnäs–Turku; 2022 onwards: Laid up as refugee housing
- Ordered: 28 October 2004
- Builder: Aker Finnyards, Rauma, Finland
- Yard number: 435
- Laid down: 21 April 2005
- Launched: 1 December 2005
- Christened: 1 December 2005 by Johanna-lisebel Järvelill
- Acquired: 18 April 2006
- Maiden voyage: 1 May 2006
- In service: 2 May 2006
- Identification: Call sign: YLGX; IMO number: 9333694; MMSI number: 266301000
- Status: In service

General characteristics
- Type: Cruiseferry
- Tonnage: 48,915 GT; 5,800 DWT
- Length: 212.10 m (695 ft 10 in)
- Beam: 29.00 m (95 ft 2 in)
- Draught: 6.40 m (21 ft 0 in)
- Depth: 15.40 m (50 ft 6 in)
- Decks: 12
- Ice class: 1 A Super
- Installed power: 4 × Wärtsilä 16V32; 26,240 kW (combined)
- Propulsion: Two shafts; controllable pitch propellers
- Speed: 22 knots (41 km/h; 25 mph)
- Capacity: 2,800 passengers; 2,500 passenger berths; 420 cars; 1,130 lanemeters

MS Galaxy 1 is a cruise ferry built in 2006 by Aker Finnyards, Rauma, Finland and was at the time the largest ship delivered to ferry operator Tallink. Between 2006 and 2008 she held the distinction of being the largest ship ever to be registered in Estonia; a title later held by her replacement the sister ship MS Baltic Princess.

Between July 2008 and September 2022, Galaxy sailed on the Stockholm–Åland–Turku route under Tallink's Silja Line brand. After ending this service, the Galaxy is scheduled to be used as refugee housing in the Netherlands for at least seven months.

== History ==
The introduction of Tallink's first newbuilding, the cruiseferry Romantika, in 2002 on the cruise service between Tallinn and Helsinki was a success. One year after her entry into this service, Tallink's fiercest competitor Viking Line, announced that they would withdraw their flagship Cinderella from the same route, replacing her with the more freight-oriented Rosella.

This led Tallink to order a bigger ship to replace the Romantika on 28 October 2004. Romantika, in turn, was needed to join her newly delivered sister ship, the Victoria I, on the Tallinn–Stockholm route.

=== Design and construction ===
Building of the new ship commenced in early 2005 and her keel was laid on 21 April. The shipyard was Aker Finnyards, Rauma. The Rauma shipyard had previously built the Romantika and the Victoria I. On 1 December 2005, the new ship was launched and christened as Galaxy.

Designed as a carefully enlarged replica of the Romantika, the Galaxy is longer and has additional cabins and public areas. Leaving behind the external livery scheme introduced on the Romantika and her sister, the Galaxy sports a white hull with a cloud decorated blue superstructure, along with a number of different animals painted on her sides. The design of the livery was made by the Estonian artist Navitrolla.

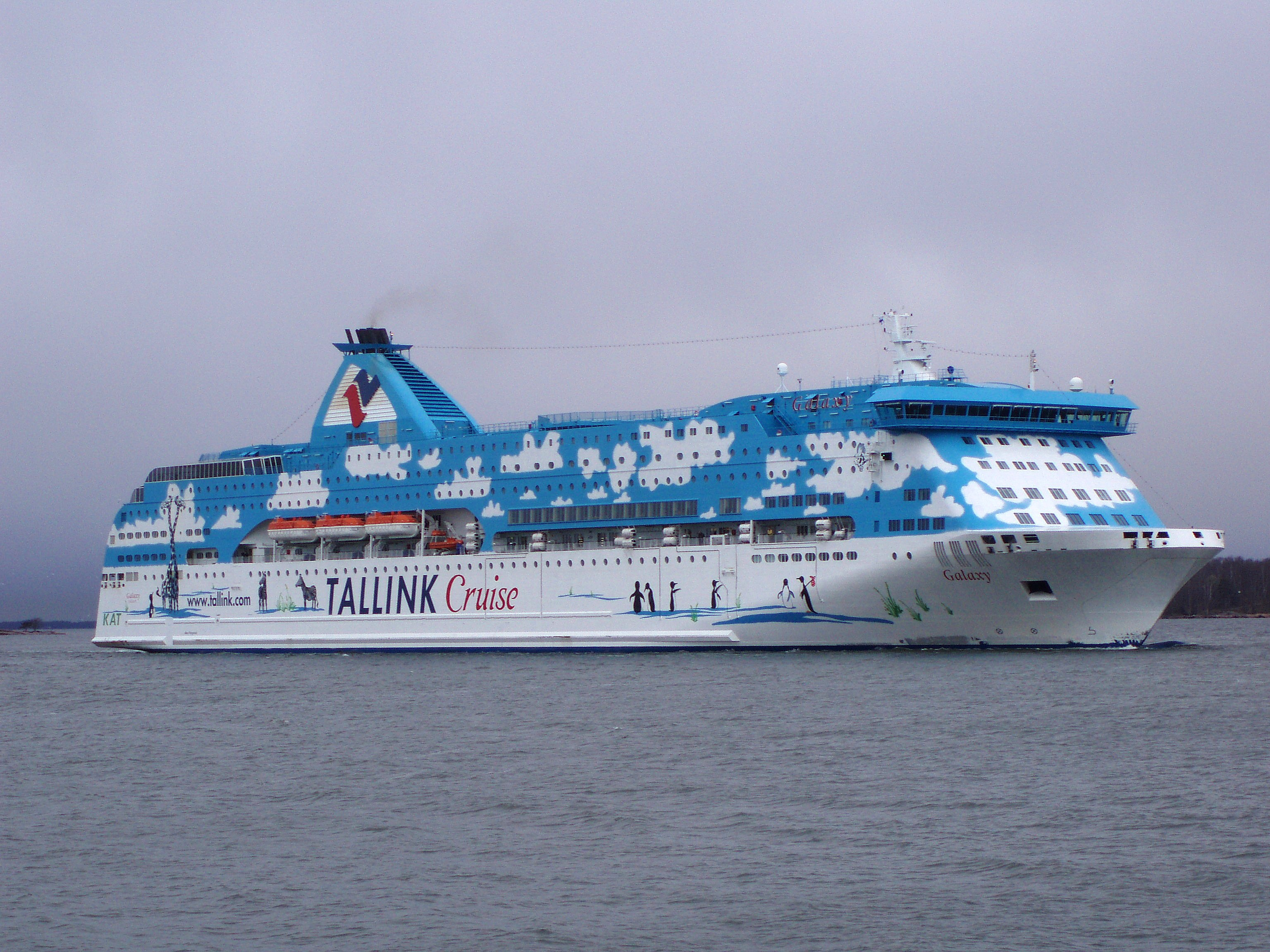
Galaxy arriving in Helsinki in Tallink colours, April 2007

=== Helsinki–Tallinn service ===
After performing her trials, the Galaxy entered service on the Tallinn–Helsinki route on 2 May 2006. The ship performed one round trip daily between the two capitals but spent most of her time moored in port—on her original route Galaxy was at sea for less than seven hours per day. In April 2007, less than a year after her introduction, Tallink announced that the Galaxy was to be transferred to the Stockholm–Mariehamn/Långnäs–Turku route during 2008. She was replaced by her sister ship Baltic Princess.

=== Stockholm–Turku service ===
Following the Baltic Princess replacing Galaxy on the Tallinn–Helsinki route, Galaxy replaced Silja Festival on the Stockholm–Turku route on 23 July 2008. Coinciding with the route change, Galaxy was re-registered to Sweden. The ships external livery, as well as her name, was left unchanged, despite an earlier statement made by Tallink that she would be re-painted in Silja livery. A "Silja Line" hull text did replace the "Tallink Cruise" text on her sides, but her Tallink funnel logo was left unaltered. Before beginning service, Galaxy was docked at Naantali for three days.

=== Refugee Housing Charter ===
Starting in September 2022, the Galaxy is still being used as refugee housing in The Netherlands.

== Decks ==
Galaxy has ten decks.

== See also ==
- Largest ferries of Europe
