= Silja Serenade =

1990 ferry

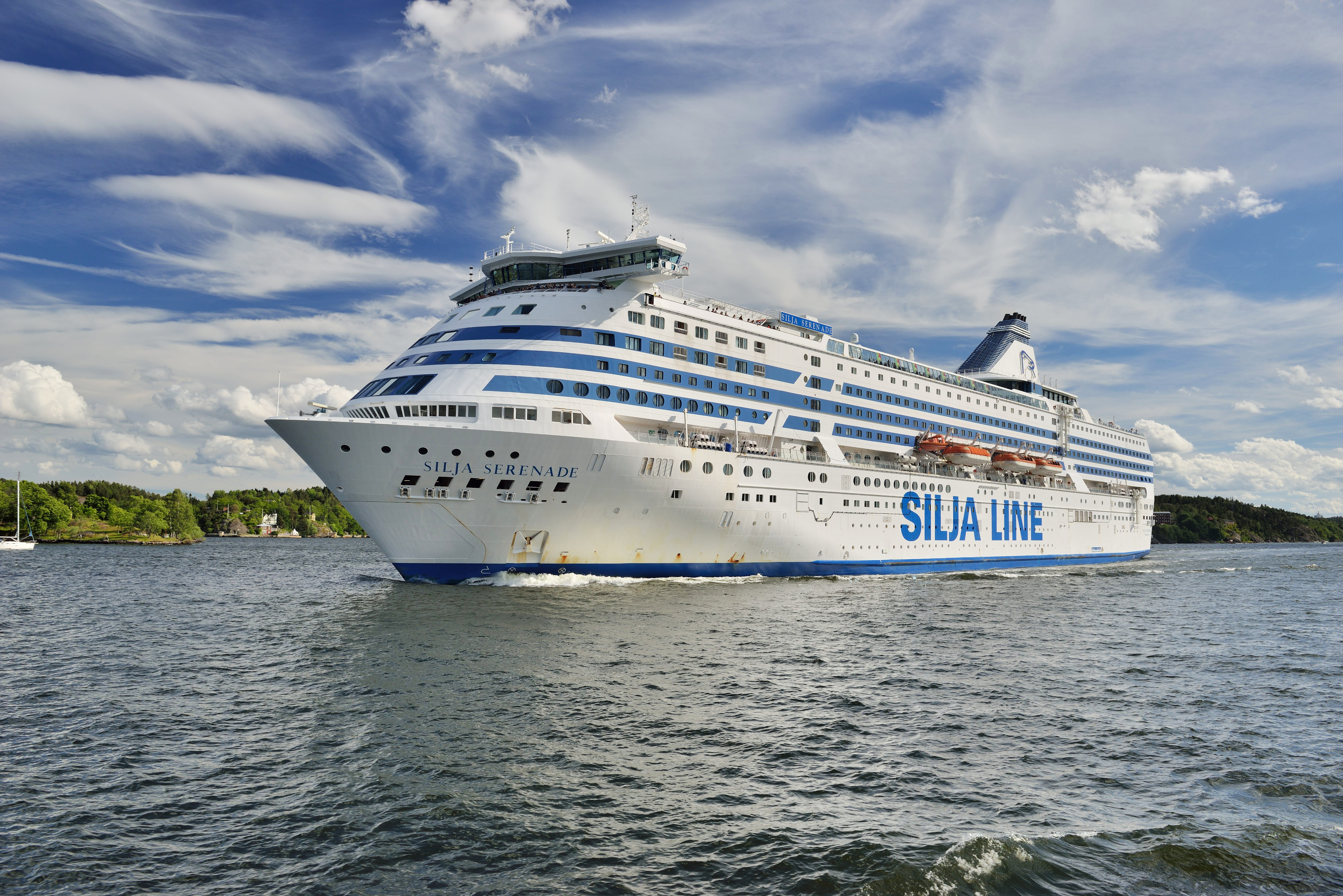
- Silja Serenade navigating in the Stockholm archipelago in 2016

History

Finland
- Name: Silja Serenade
- Owner: 1990–1992: EffJohn; 1992–2006: Silja Line; 2006 onwards: Tallink
- Operator: 1990 onwards: Silja Line
- Port of registry: 1990–1993: Helsinki, Finland; 1993 onwards: Mariehamn, Finland
- Route: Helsinki–Mariehamn–Stockholm
- Ordered: 26 October 1987
- Builder: Masa-Yards Turku New Shipyard, Turku, Finland
- Yard number: 1301
- Laid down: 29 May 1989
- Launched: 6 November 1989
- Acquired: 15 November 1990
- Maiden voyage: 17 November 1990
- In service: 17 November 1990
- Identification: Call sign: OJCS; MMSI number: 230184000; IMO number: 8715259
- Status: In service

General characteristics
- Type: Cruiseferry
- Tonnage: 58,376 GT
- Length: 203.03 m (666.1 ft)
- Beam: 31.93 m (104.8 ft)
- Height: 63 m (206 ft 8 in)
- Draught: 7.12 m (23.4 ft)
- Decks: 13
- Ice class: 1 A Super
- Installed power: 4 × Wärtsilä-Vasa 9R46 diesels; combined 32,500 kW (43,600 hp)
- Speed: 23 knots (43 km/h; 26 mph)
- Capacity: Passengers: 2,626 (originally); 2,852 (currently); Passenger beds: 2,626 (originally); 2,841 (currently); Car capacity: 450; Lanemeters: 950

Silja Serenade is a cruiseferry owned by the Estonian shipping company Tallink, operating under their Silja Line brand on a route connecting Helsinki to Stockholm via Mariehamn. She was built in 1990 by Masa-Yards at Turku New Shipyard, Finland. During the 2020 Covid pandemic, the ship operated a summer Helsinki–Riga service.

== History ==
The ship was ordered on 26 October 1987 by Effoa for Silja Line traffic. The ship had a revolutionary interior layout, with a promenade-street running alongside the central axis of the ship for nearly her full length. This allowed, among other things, for a larger number of cabins with windows (today such promenades are found in the most recent ships of Royal Caribbean and Color Line). Before the ship was completed, Silja Line's owners Effoa and Johnson Line merged to form EffJohn, and it was to EffJohn that the Silja Serenade was delivered on 15 November 1990.

On 18 November 1990, she began service on the Helsinki–Stockholm route. Her original homeport was Helsinki, but in 1992 she was reflagged to the Ålandian ship registry, her homeport altered to Mariehamn. This allowed Silja to make more money from her onboard slot machines and casino, due to legislation differences between Åland and the Finnish mainland. When Silja Line acquired Silja Europa in 1993, the Serenade was moved to the Turku–Mariehamn–Stockholm route. The Silja Serenade was somewhat ill-suited for this route; her accommodations were not designed for daytime crossings and reportedly she steered poorly in the narrow archipelagoes of Stockholm, Åland and Turku. In 1995, it was decided that the Europa and Serenade switch routes, returning the Serenade to her original route, again sailing parallel to her sister ship Silja Symphony. In order to keep tax free sales on the Stockholm–Helsinki ships when the EU changed its tax free legislation, a stop at Mariehamn was added to the route in July 1999. In early 2006, just prior to the sale of Silja Line to Tallink, Serenade and her sister had their interiors extensively rebuilt at Turku Repair Yard, Naantali.

There are some minor differences between the Serenade and her sister. The funnel of Serenade is constructed of steel, whereas that of her sister ship Symphony is made of aluminium. There are also some purely cosmetic differences: the outer decks of the Serenade are painted green (blue on Symphony), the light box with the ship's name is blue (white on Symphony) and the seal's eye in the funnel is white with a blue outline (solid blue on Symphony). In 2014, the steel seal was replaced with a painted one.

When the ship docked in October 2010, the 13th deck was rebuilt, removing Silja Dream Theater, Club Bali and Chill Lounge. Instead, a New York-themed club and lounge was built.

In January 2014, the ship was docked again at Turku Repair Yard. The Taxfree shop, Buffet Serenade, and Bistro Maxime restaurant on deck 6 were extensively rebuilt, as well as the Sunflower Oasis on deck 12 and the shops on deck 7.

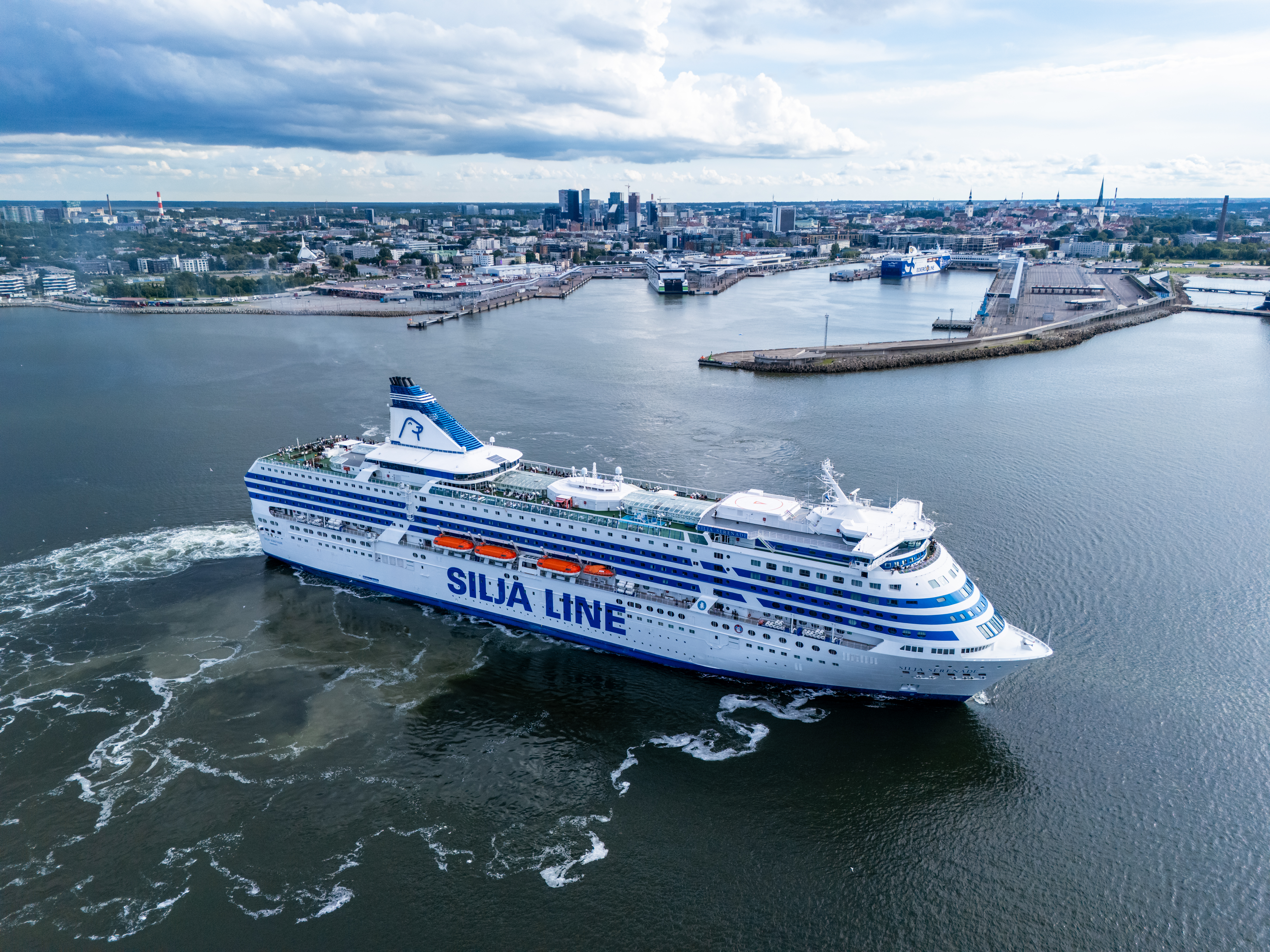
Silja Serenade departing Port of Tallinn 02.07.2026

In 2020, services were disrupted by the COVID-19 pandemic, and on 26 June, the vessel began operating a temporary summer ferry route between Helsinki and Riga, departing each capital city on alternate days. On 13 September, the ship was replaced by Baltic Queen, and laid up in Helsinki.

== Facilities ==
The Silja Serenade has a maximum capacity of 2,852 passengers, 450 cars and 65 freight vehicles. There are 986 cabins with a total of 2,841 berths, as well as several restaurants, bars, lounges, conference rooms, sports facilities and duty-free shops.

== See also ==
- Largest ferries of Europe

| Preceded by Cinderella | World's Largest Cruiseferry; 1990–1991 | Succeeded by Silja Symphony |
