= MS Floria =

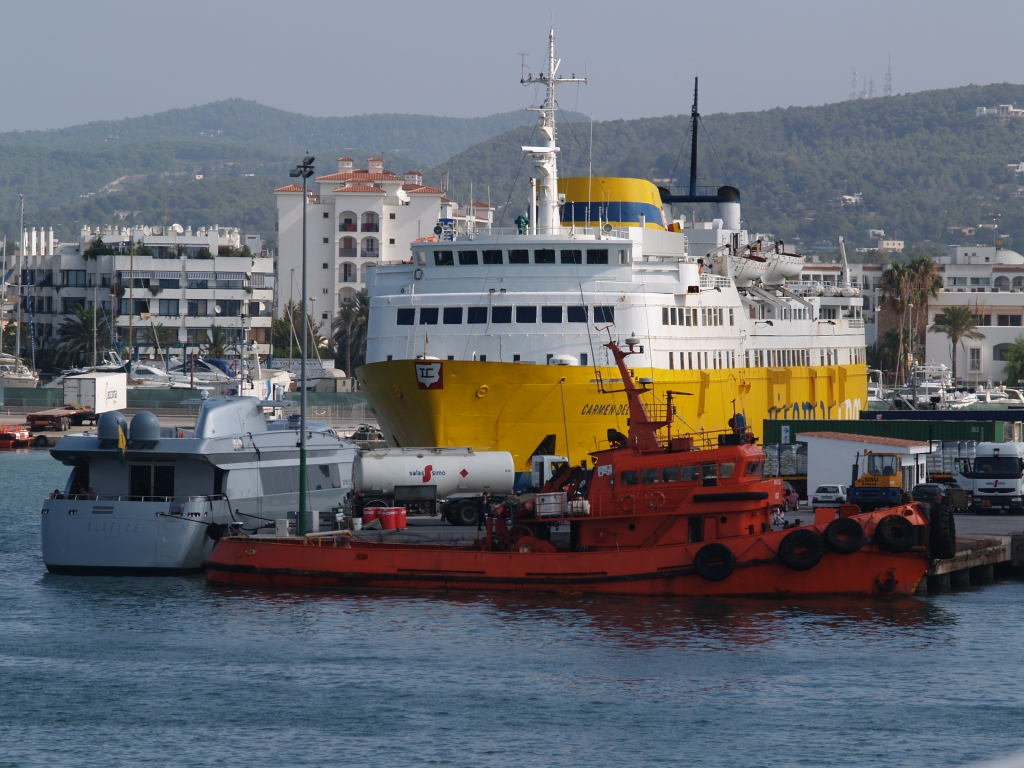
- The ship as Carmen Del Mar at Ibiza in 2007.

History
- Name: 1970–1975: Floria; 1975–2002: Villa De Agaete; 2002–2008: Carmen Del Mar
- Owner: 1970–1975: Siljavarustamo; 1975–1999: Trasmediterranea; 1999–2002: Naviera Armas; 2002–2008: Iscomar
- Operator: 1970–1975: Siljavarustamo; 1975–1999: Trasmediterranea; 1999–2002: Naviera Armas; 2002–2008: Iscomar
- Ordered: 15 October 1968
- Builder: Wärtsilä Helsinki Shipyard
- Laid down: 25 April 1969
- Launched: 28 August 1969
- Christened: 28 August 1969
- In service: 13 April 1970
- Out of service: 2008
- Identification: Call sign: OGWG; IMO number: 7000803
- Fate: Scrapped in India in 2008

General characteristics
- Tonnage: 4,051 GRT; 1,684 NRT; 1,220 DWT
- Length: 101.60 m (333 ft 4 in)
- Beam: 18.53 m (60 ft 10 in)
- Draught: 5.00 m (16 ft 5 in)
- Ice class: 1A
- Installed power: 8 × 8 cyl. Wärtsilä 824TS
- Speed: 19 knots (35 km/h; 22 mph)
- Capacity: 1,000 passengers; 188 passenger berths; 195 cars

MS Floria was a ferry ordered by Siljarederiet Ab in 1968 and constructed by Wärtsilä Helsinki Shipyard between 1968 and 1970. It was set to sail between Turku and Stockholm. The ship has a sister-ship called MS Botnia.

== History ==
=== 1975–2002 ===
In 1975 it was sold to Compañia Trasmediterranea S.A. and was renamed to Villa De Agaete. In 1999 it was sold to Naviera Armas S.A., and in 2002 it was sold again to Iscomar and renamed to Carmen Del Mar.

=== 2002–2008 ===
Whilst operating for Iscomar, the ship sailed on the route Denia-Palma. On 2 July 2007, the ship was held at Denia port due to poor hygiene and safety issues on board. On 18 April 2008, the ship hit the side of a smaller vessel, Manuel Azana, outside Ibiza. Later that year the ship was taken out of service. On 5 September 2008, the ship was sold to be scrapped in India.
