= Silja Line =

Finnish cruiseferry brand

Tallink Silja Oy
- Type: Subsidiary
- Industry: Shipping
- Founded: 1957
- Headquarters: Helsinki, Finland
- Area served: Northern Europe
- Key people: Margus Schults
- Products: Ferries, port services, passenger transportation, freight transportation, holidays, business travel
- Parent: AS Tallink Grupp
- Website: www.tallinksilja.com

Silja Line is a Finnish shipping company and cruiseferry brand owned and operated by the Estonian shipping company AS Tallink Grupp, for car, cargo and passenger traffic between Finland and Sweden.

The former company Silja Oy—today Tallink Silja Oy—is, since 2006, a subsidiary of AS Tallink Grupp, handling marketing and sales for Tallink and Silja Line brands in Finland as well as managing Tallink Silja's ship employees. Another subsidiary, Tallink Silja AB, handles marketing and sales in Sweden. Strategical corporate management is performed by Tallink Grupp which also own the ships.

As of 2009, four ships service two routes under the Silja Line brand, transporting about three million passengers and 200,000 cars every year. The Silja Line ships have a market share of around 50 percent on the two routes served.

The Silja Line logo features the text Silja Line and a figure of a seal. Since 2014, the figure of the seal has been smiling. The famous theme tune heard in Silja Line's television commercials comes from the tune "Un homme et une femme" ("A man and a woman") by the French film composer Francis Lai.

== History ==
=== 1904–1957 ===
The history of Silja Line can be traced back to 1904, when two Finnish shipping companies, Finland Steamship Company (Finska Ångfartygs Aktiebolaget, FÅA for short) and Steamship Company Bore, started collaborating on Finland–Sweden traffic. The initial collaboration agreement was terminated in 1909, but re-established in 1910. After World War I in 1918, a new agreement was made that also included the Swedish Rederi AB Svea. Originally the collaboration agreement applied only on service between Turku and Stockholm, but it was also applied to the Helsinki–Stockholm route in 1928. As a precursor to the policies later adopted by Silja Line, each of the three companies ordered a near-identical ship for Helsinki–Stockholm service to coincide with the 1952 Summer Olympics, held in Helsinki. Eventually only Finland SS Co.'s SS Aallotar was ready in time for the Olympics. At this time the city of Helsinki constructed the Olympia Terminal in Helsinki's South Harbour, which Silja Line's ships still use.

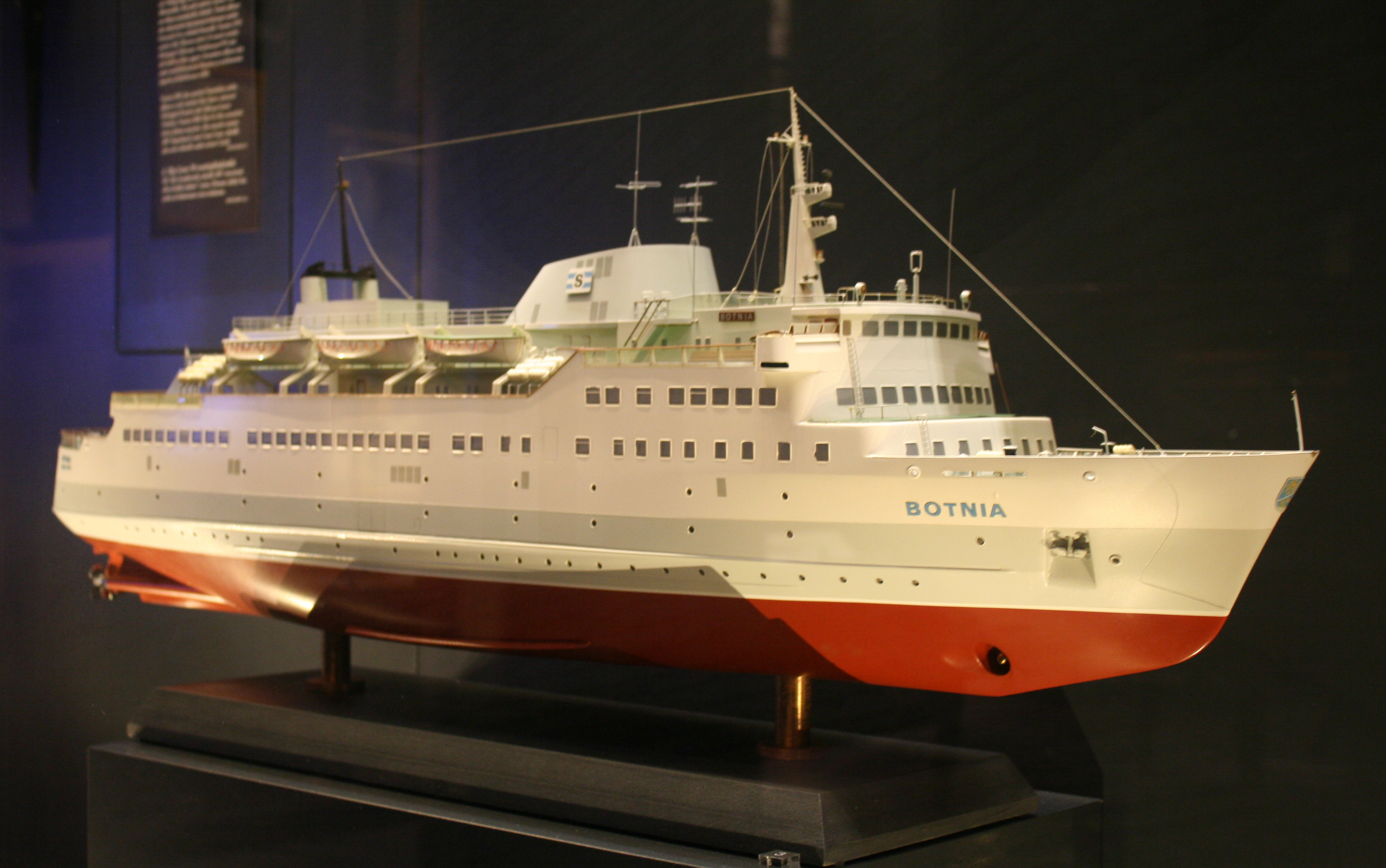
Model of MS Botnia in Siljavarustamo livery

Silja Line's old logo

=== 1957–1970 ===
Realising that car-passenger ferries would be the dominant traffic form in the future, the three collaborating companies decided to form a daughter company, Oy Siljavarustamo/Siljarederiet Ab. The new company started out with used ships, which were not particularly well-fitted for the role they were meant for, but in 1961 Silja took delivery of the new MS Skandia, the first purpose-built car-passenger ferry in the northern Baltic Sea. Skandia's sister MS Nordia followed the next year and the era's giant MS Fennia in 1966. Two more ships based on the Skandia design, MS Botnia and MS Floria, were delivered in 1967 and 1970 respectively.

Despite the establishment of Silja, FÅA, Bore and Svea also continued to operate on the same routes with their own ships. This led to a somewhat complex situation where four different companies were marketed as one entity. In Finland they went by the name Ruotsinlaivat ('Sweden's Ships' or 'Ships to Sweden') whereas in Sweden the preferred terms were Det Samseglande (roughly 'the ones that sail together'), Finlandsbåten ('Finland's Ships') or Sverigebåten ('Sweden Ships'). In both countries the names of all four companies were usually displayed alongside the group identity.

=== 1970–1980 ===
In 1967, three of Silja's rival companies had formed a joint marketing and coordination company, Viking Line, which was to become Silja Line's main rival for the next two decades. FÅA, Bore and Svea soon realised that a similar arrangement would be preferable to their current fragmented image, and in 1970 a big change was carried out within the organisations: Silja Line was established as a joint marketing and coordination company between FÅA, Bore and Svea, and the ships of Siljavarustamo were divided between these three. All Silja Line ships were painted in the same colour scheme, with a white hull and superstructure, with Silja Line and the seal's head logo on the side in dark blue. Each company retained their own funnel colours, so it was easy to distinguish which ship belonged to which company even from a distance: Svea's funnels were white with a large black S, FÅA's were black with two white bands, and Bore's were yellow with a blue/white cross.

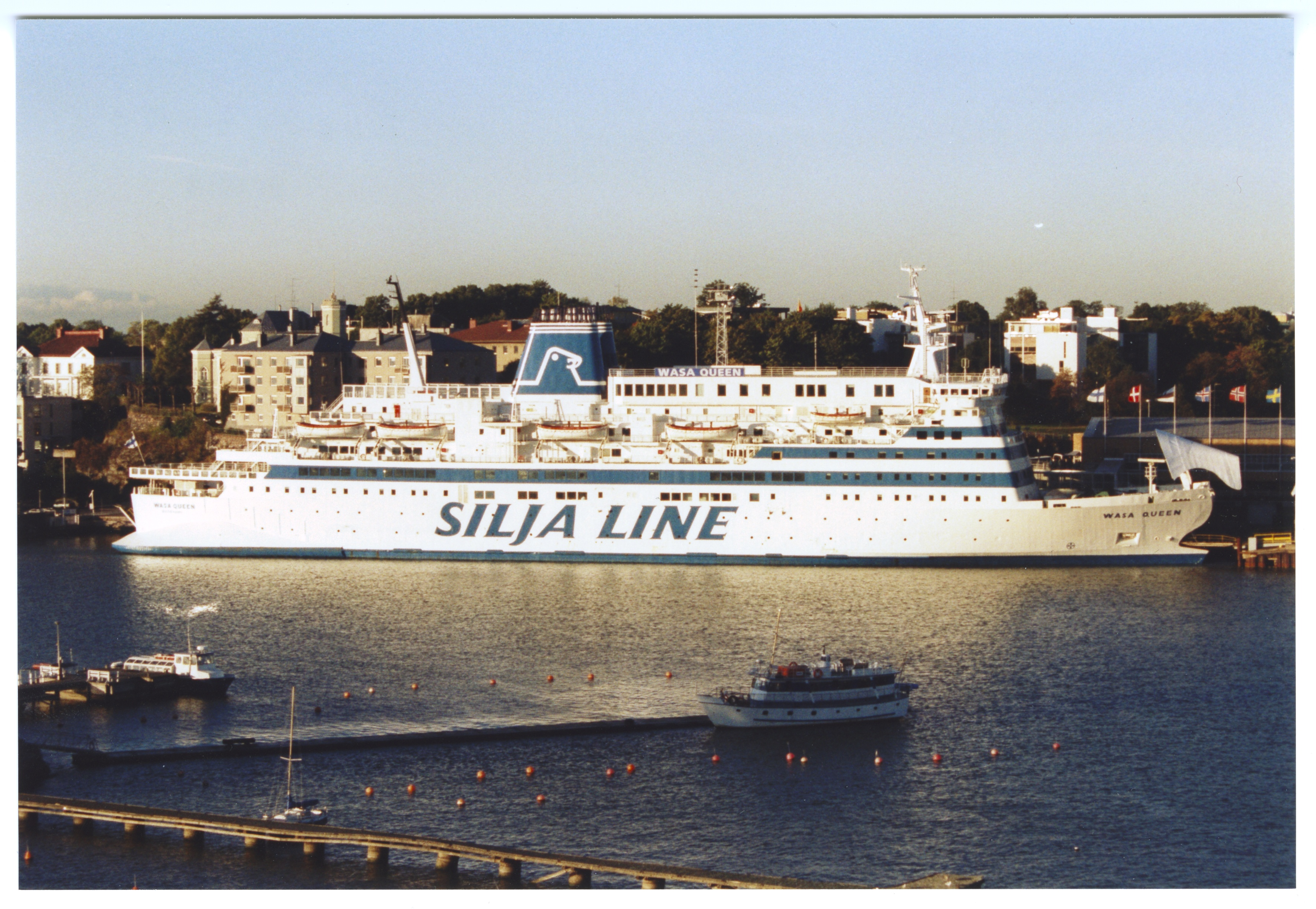
MS Bore Star, built 1975, left the Silja fleet in 1986 and re-joined it in 1993 as MS Wasa Queen.

Already before the reorganisation Silja had ordered two new ships from Dubigeon-Normandie S.A. of Nantes to begin year-round service between Helsinki and Stockholm (until then the route was summers only). In 1972, these were delivered to FÅA and Svea as MS Aallotar and MS Svea Regina, respectively. Passenger numbers on the Helsinki route grew fast and already in 1973 it was decided that the three companies would each order a ship of identical design from the same shipyard to replace the current Helsinki–Stockholm ships. These were delivered in 1975, first MS Svea Corona and MS Wellamo, followed by MS Bore Star in December. However, winter passenger numbers were insufficient for three ships, and as a result Bore Star was chartered to Finnlines during the winters of 1975–76 and 1976–77. In 1976 Finland SS Co changed its name to Effoa (the Finnish phonetic spelling of FÅA). During the latter part of the 1970s Effoa's old ferries MS Ilmatar and MS Regina cruised the Baltic, Norwegian fjords and the Atlantic (from Málaga) under the marketing name Silja Cruises.

=== 1980–1986 ===
In 1979, Svea and Effoa decided again to order new ships for the Helsinki–Stockholm route, which would be the largest ferries of their time. Bore, however, decided not to participate in building new ships, and in 1980 opted to bow out of passenger traffic altogether (Bore Line still exists as a freight-carrying company). Their two ships were sold to Effoa and their shares of Silja Line split between the two other companies. In Finland, and later in Sweden, a large maritime strike in spring 1980 stopped ferry traffic completely and prompted Effoa to terminate the Silja Cruises service.

Despite the difficulties Silja's first real cruiseferries, Finlandia and MS Silvia Regina, entered service in 1981, which led to a 45% raise in passenger numbers. Late in the same year Johnson Line purchased Rederi AB Svea, and the former Svea ships received Johnson Line's blue/yellow colours. The good experiences with the new Helsinki ships prompted Effoa and Johnson Line to order two ships built on a similar principle for traffic on the Turku–Stockholm route, which were delivered in 1985 and 1986 as MS Svea and MS Wellamo. Although similar in proportions and interior layout, the new ships sported an attractive streamlined superstructure instead of the box-like superstructure of Finlandia and Silvia Regina.

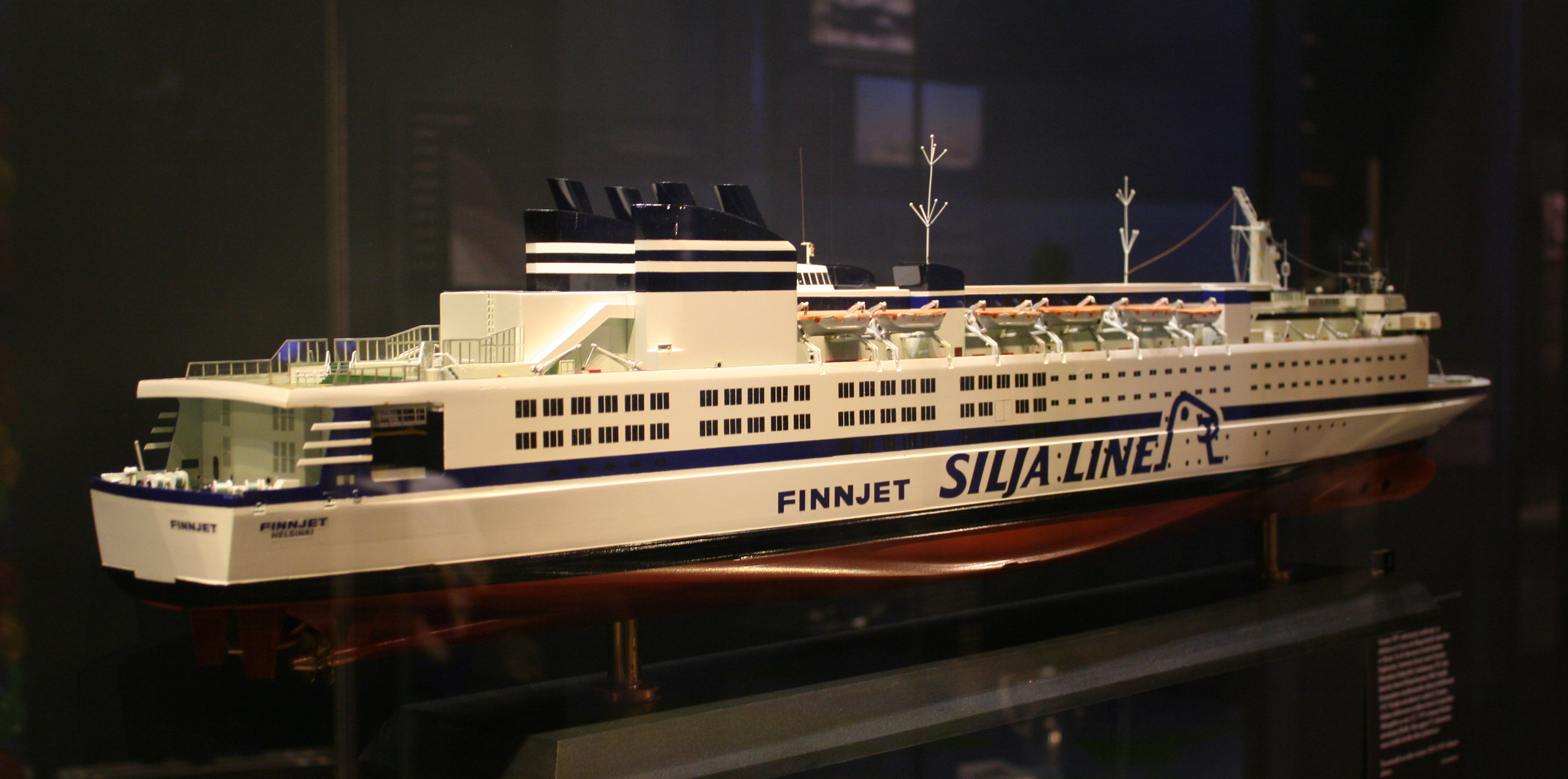
Model of the world's fastest cruiseferry, GTS Finnjet, in 1980s Silja Line livery (ships owned by Johnson Line had different funnel colours)

=== 1987–1992 ===
1987 was a very eventful year for Silja. Effoa had purchased the famously fast GTS Finnjet the previous year and from the beginning of 1987 the prestigious but unprofitable "Queen of the Baltic Sea" joined Silja Line's fleet. Later in the same year Effoa and Johnson Line jointly purchased Rederi Ab Sally, one of the owners of their rival Viking Line. The other Viking Line partners forced the new owners to sell their share in Viking, but Effoa and Johnson Line retained Vaasanlaivat / Vasabåtarna, Sally Cruises, Sally Ferries UK and Commodore Cruise Line. Although the purchase of Sally had no effect on Silja Line's traffic for the time being, it proved to be important later. Finally, 1987 saw another order of new ships for the Helsinki–Stockholm route, which would again be the largest ferries ever built, eventually named MS Silja Serenade and MS Silja Symphony. Not revealed at the time, the new ships had a 140-meter promenade-street running along the center of the ship, a feature never seen before in a ship, but by the first decade of the 21st century commonly found on Royal Caribbean International's and Color Line's newer ships.

In late 1989, Wärtsilä Marine, the shipyard building Silja's new cruiseferries, went bankrupt, which led to the ships being delivered later than had been planned. To ensure the delivery of their ferries Effoa and Johnson Line both purchased a part of the new Masa-Yards established to continue shipbuilding in Wärtsilä's former shipyards.

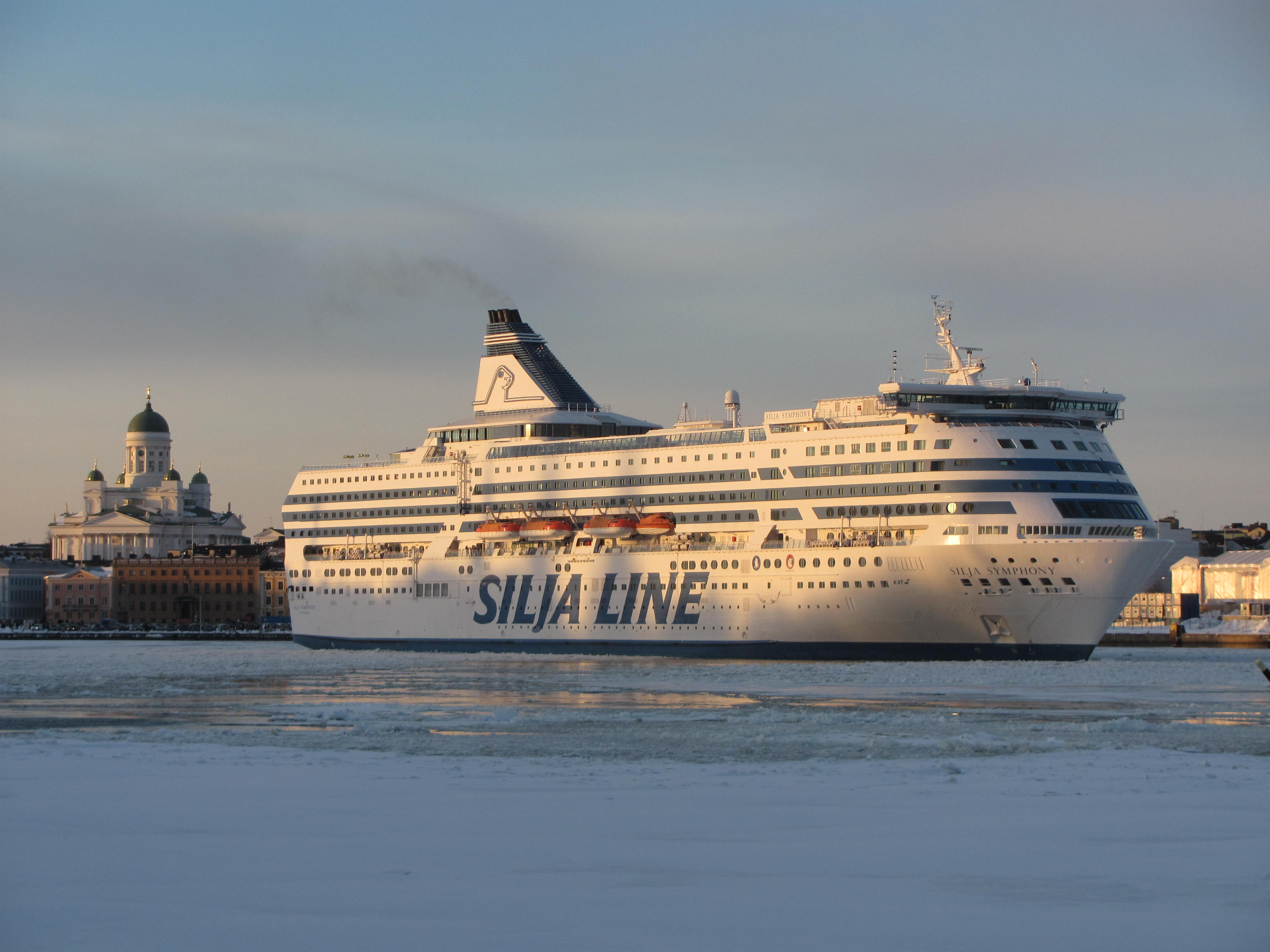
MS Silja Symphony in Eteläsatama, Helsinki, Finland

The year 1990 saw the realisation of an old vision: Effoa and Johnson Line merged to form EffJohn. As a result, the seal's head logo replaced the colours of each individual owner company on the funnel. In November, the new MS Silja Serenade made its maiden voyage from Helsinki to Stockholm, approximately seven months after the original planned delivery date. MS Silja Symphony was delivered the following year. Although popular and sporting a successful design, the new ships had been very expensive. This expense, coupled with the depression in the early 1990s, forced EffJohn to cut costs, which resulted in Wasa Line and Sally Cruises being merged into Silja Line in 1992. Also in 1992, Svea and Wellamo were modernised and renamed Silja Karneval and Silja Festival, respectively.

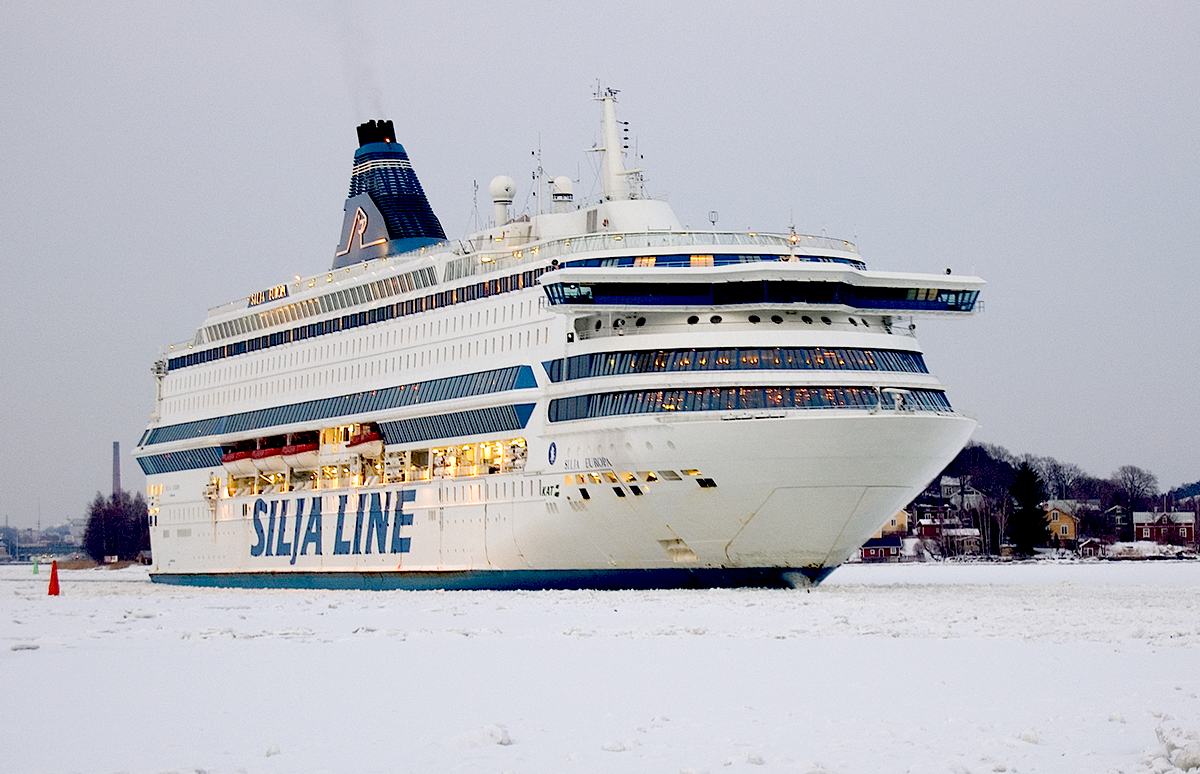
MS Silja Europa, the largest cruiseferry in the world from 1993 to 2001, was built for Viking Line but chartered on delivery to Silja Line by the shipyard.

=== 1993–2006 ===
The year 1993 began with a bang. In January it was reported that Silja Line had chartered MS Europa, a ship under construction for Rederi AB Slite, one of the owners of Viking Line. Because of financial troubles Slite could not pay for their new ship, and the shipyard decided to charter it to Silja instead. Later in the same year Silja joined forces with Euroway on their Malmö–Travemünde–Lübeck route. The route proved unprofitable and was terminated in spring 1994.

MS Sally Albatross was grounded outside Helsinki in spring 1994 and suffered major damage, which prompted Silja to give up traffic on her. September 1994 saw the largest peace-time maritime disaster on the Baltic Sea, the sinking of MS Estonia. Silja Europa, Silja Symphony and Finnjet all assisted in searching for survivors from the disaster. Silja Festival was berthed opposite Estonia in Tallinn the day before the sinking, but she was in Helsinki when Estonia sank and did not come to her assistance. The Estonia sinking led to passenger numbers dropping, which did not help Silja's precarious financial situation. The company was now the largest on the Baltic Sea, having finally overtaken Viking Line in 1993, but financially it was not doing well. In 1995, Effjohn changed their name to Silja Oy Ab. Three years later the name was changed again, this time to Neptun Maritime.

In 1999, Silja faced two big changes. Tax-free sales ended on routes between EU countries, which forced the Helsinki–Stockholm ships to start calling at Mariehamn in Åland, whose autonomous status within Finland allowed them to stay outside the EU tax union after the country joined the EU in 1994 and so avoid the end of tax-fee sales. A bigger change was Sea Containers purchasing the majority of Neptun Maritime's shares. In 2000, the new owners brought one of their Super SeaCats into service on the Helsinki–Tallinn route and Neptun Maritime again changed its name, this time to Silja Oyj Abp. In the same year the route between Vaasa and Umeå was terminated as unprofitable.

By 2004, Sea Containers owned Silja Line entirely. The company was doing well financially and all seemed to be going well. However, Sea Containers' other operations were not as profitable and in late 2005 they announced their intent to give up their ferry division completely; this naturally including selling Silja Line. In preparation for the sale, the unprofitable Finnjet and MS Silja Opera were taken out of service and transferred under Sea Containers' ownership. Silja Serenade and Symphony were also rebuilt in early 2006 to make them more attractive to potential buyers.

=== 2006–present ===
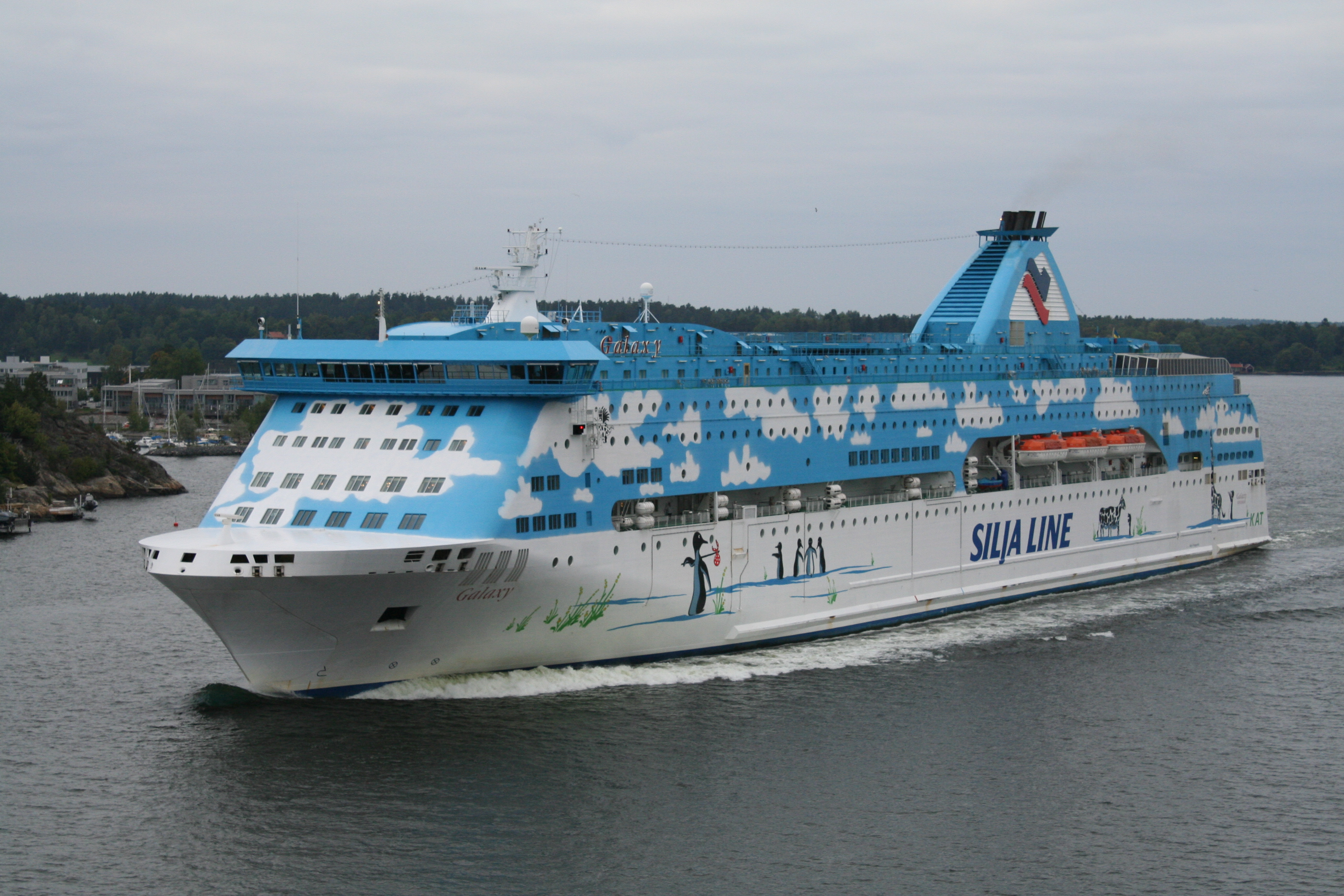
MS Galaxy was transferred from the fleet of Tallink to that of Silja Line in 2008.

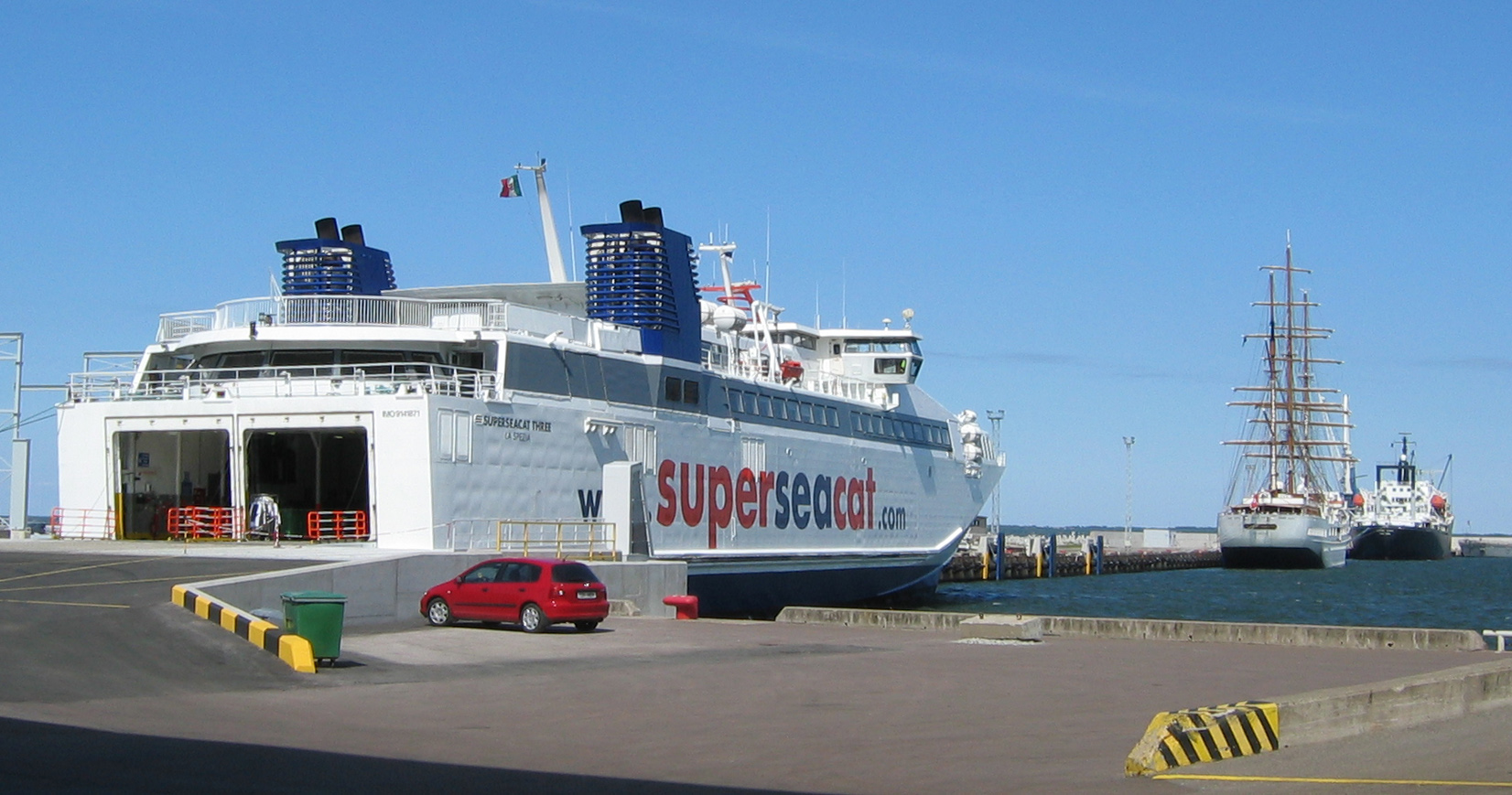
SuperSeaCat Three in 2007

May 2006 saw the sale of Silja Line to the Estonian Tallink. The SuperSeaCats trafficking between Helsinki and Tallinn were not included in the sale as their purchase would have given Tallink a dominant market position on the route, which would have resulted in the competition regulators of Finland and Estonia not approving the sale. As a result, Sea Containers, after barely a year before announcing their intention to give up the ferry business completely, continued operating them under the SuperSeaCat brand. In late 2006 the land organisations of Tallink and Silja Line were reorganised in Finland so that Tallink Finland and Superfast Finland were merged into Oyj Silja Abp, which now took care of all Finnish operations of Tallink/Silja. Shortly afterwards Oyj Silja Abp was renamed into Tallink Silja Oy. Similarly the land organisations in Sweden became Tallink Silja AB.

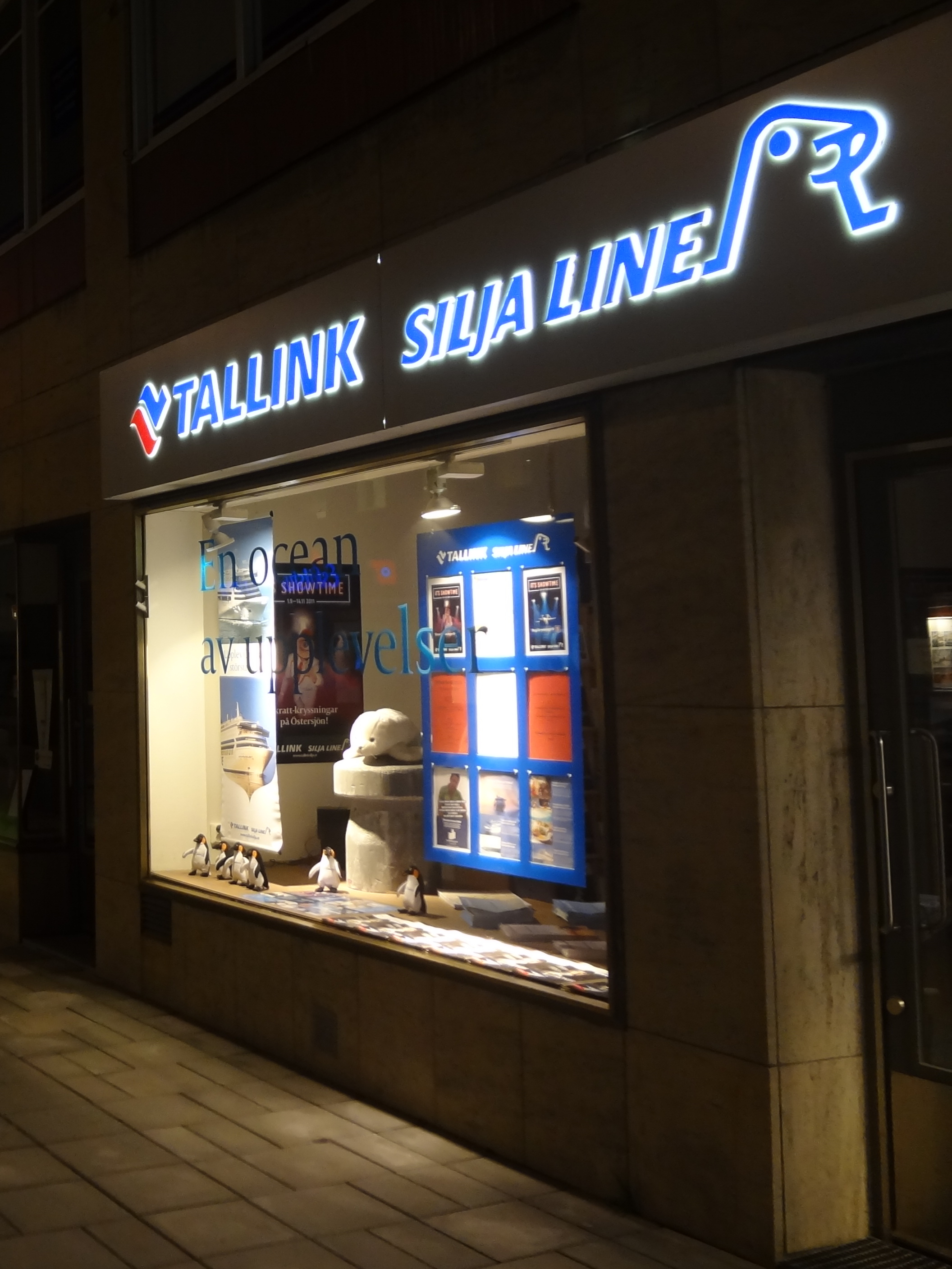
A Tallink Silja Line travel shop in Sweden.

Tallink stated that it intended to keep the Silja Line brand separated from Tallink. However, most Silja Line marketing in Finland and Sweden has since the takeover been made under the combined Tallink Silja name.

In July 2008, the Tallink ship MS Galaxy replaced the Silja Festival on the Turku–Mariehamn–Stockholm route. The Galaxy was flagged to Sweden and the text Silja Line was painted on her hull sides. The Tallink logo remained on her funnel and the Navitrolla-designed livery of the ship, which differs from the livery of other Silja ships, was not altered. The Silja Festival, while remaining registered under the same name, was in turn moved to Tallink's Stockholm–Riga route, her funnel repainted in Tallink colours and the text Tallink painted on her sides.

In October 2009, the Managing Director of Silja Line (Tallink Silja Oy), Keijo Mehtonen, retired and Margus Schults was appointed to the post.

In February 2013 MS Baltic Princess switched routes with the MS Silja Europa, with Baltic Princess now placed on the Turku–Stockholm route and Silja Europa on Helsinki–Tallinn cruises.

In July 2022, Tallink announced that MS Galaxy would be withdrawn in September 2022 from the Turku–Stockholm service for at least seven months. One month later, it was announced that Galaxy's sister ship on the same route, MS Baltic Princess, at the same time would abandon calls at Mariehamn and Stockholm, instead calling at Långnäs and Kapellskär respectively. Tallink states that these changes are temporary and that full service would resume after the market downturn.

== Fleet ==
=== Current fleet ===
Ship	Type	Built	Entered service	Gross tonnage	Passengers (max)	Vehicles	Knots	Route	Flag and home port	Image
MS Silja Serenade	Cruiseferry	1990	1990–	58,376 GT	2.852	450	23	Helsinki – Mariehamn – Stockholm	(Åland) Mariehamn, Finland	
MS Silja Symphony	Cruiseferry	1991	1991–	58,376 GT	2.852	450	23	Helsinki – Mariehamn – Stockholm	Stockholm, Sweden	
MS Baltic Princess	Cruiseferry	2008	2013–	48,915 GT	2.800	600	24,5	Turku – Mariehamn / Långnäs – Stockholm	(Åland) Mariehamn, Finland	

=== Former ships ===
Ships that are still in use are marked in green.

Ship	Built	Owner/operator	In service	Current status
SS Silja	1915	Siljavarustamo	1957–1967	Scrapped in Helsinki, Finland, 1971.
SS Warjo	1927	Siljavarustamo	1957–1964	Scrapped in Baia, Romania, 1983.
SS Romka	1966	Siljavarustamo	1966-1981	Caught fire and sank as SS Ocean Dream in Oslo, Norway 2010
SS Regin	1960	Siljavarustamo	1960–1961	Scrapped in Gothenburg, Sweden, 1968.
MS Skandia	1961	Siljavarustamo; Finland Steamship Company	1961–1974	Sunk in the Atlantic, 1986.
MS Nordia	1962	Siljavarustamo; Rederi AB Svea	1962–1974	Scrapped in Eleusis, Greece, 1988.
MS Fennia	1964	Siljavarustamo; Svea Line (Finland); EffJohn; Silja Line	1966–1970; 1970–1984; 1993–2001	Scrapped in 2010.
MS Botnia	1967	Siljavarustamo; Steamship Company Bore	1967–1970; 1970–1975	Sunk outside Morocco, 2008.
SS Bore	1960	Steamship Company Bore	1970–1976	Since 2010 hotel/restaurant/museum ship.
MS Ilmatar	1964	Finland Steamship Company	1970–1974; 1978–1980	Scrapped in 2015.
SS Birger Jarl; SS Bore Nord	1970	Rederi AB Svea; Steamship Company Bore	1970–1973; 1974–1976	Since 2002 MS Birger Jarl for Ånedin Linjen.
MS Floria	1970	Finland Steamship Company	1970–1975	Scrapped in India, 2008.
MS Aallotar	1972	Finland Steamship Company	1972–1977	Scrapped in Alang, India, 2004.
MS Svea Regina; MS Regina	1972	Rederi AB Svea; Effoa	1972–1978; 1979	Scrapped in Alang, India, 2005.
Bore 1/Skandia	1973	Steamship Company Bore Effoa	1973–1980; 1980–1983	Scrapped in Alang, India, 2021.
MS Svea Corona	1974	Rederi AB Svea; Johnson Line	1975–1984	Scrapped in Aliağa, Turkey, 1995.
MS Wellamo; MS Svea Corona	1975	Effoa; Johnson Line	1975–1981; 1984–1985	Sunk in 2017.
MS Bore Star; MS Silja Star; MS Wasa Queen	1975	Bore Line; Effoa; Effjohn	1976–1980; 1980–1986; 1992–2000	Scrapped in India, 2013.
MS Finlandia	1981	Effoa	1981–1990	Scrapped in 2025.
MS Silvia Regina	1981	Rederi Ab Svea; Johnson Line	1981–1991	Since 2020 MS Saga is accommodation platformfor laid up in Singapore for Bridgeman Expedition Lp, Limassol, Cypern. Management Tschudi Ship Management.
MS Svea; MS Silja Karneval	1985	Johnson Line; EffJohn	1985–1992; 1992–1994	Since 2008 MS Mega Smeralda for Corsica Ferries.
GTS Finnjet	1977	Effoa; EffJohn	1987–2006	Scrapped in Alang, India, 2009.
MS Silja Star	1980	Effoa	1990	Sunk 1994 as MS Estonia.
MS Frans Suell; MS Silja Scandinavia	1992	Euroway; EffJohn	1992–1994; 1994–1997	Since 1997 MS Gabriella for Viking Line.
MS Stena Invicta (marketed as Wasa Jubilee)	1985	Silja Line	1998 (charter)	Since 2022 MS Superstar II for Seajets.
HSC SuperSeaCat Four	1999	SeaContainers	2000–2006 (summers only)	Since 2021 HSC Superrunner Jet for Seajets.
HSC SeaCat Denmark	1990	SeaContainers	2000	Since 2015 HSC Atlantic Express with Colonia Express.
HSC SuperSeaCat Three	1999	SeaContainers	2003–2006 (summers only)	Since 2022 HSC Speedrunner Jet for Seajets.
HSC SuperSeaCat One	1997	SeaContainers	summer 2005	Since 2023 HSC Speedrunner Jet 2 for Seajets.
MS Sally Albatross; MS Silja Opera	1992	EffJohn; Silja Line	1992–1994; 2002–2006	Scrapped in Alang, India, 2025.
MS Wellamo; MS Silja Festival	1986	Effoa; EffJohn; Silja Line	1986–1992; 1992–2008	Since 2015 MS Mega Andrea for Corsica Ferries.
MS Silja Europa	1993	Effoa; EffJohn; Silja Line	1993–2013	Since 2013 transferred to Tallink.
MS Galaxy	2006	Effoa; EffJohn; Silja Line	2008–2022	Since 2023 chartered for Tallink in The Netherlands.

== Terminals ==
Silja Line has five terminals, of which four are in Finland (two in mainland Finland and two in Åland) and one in Sweden.

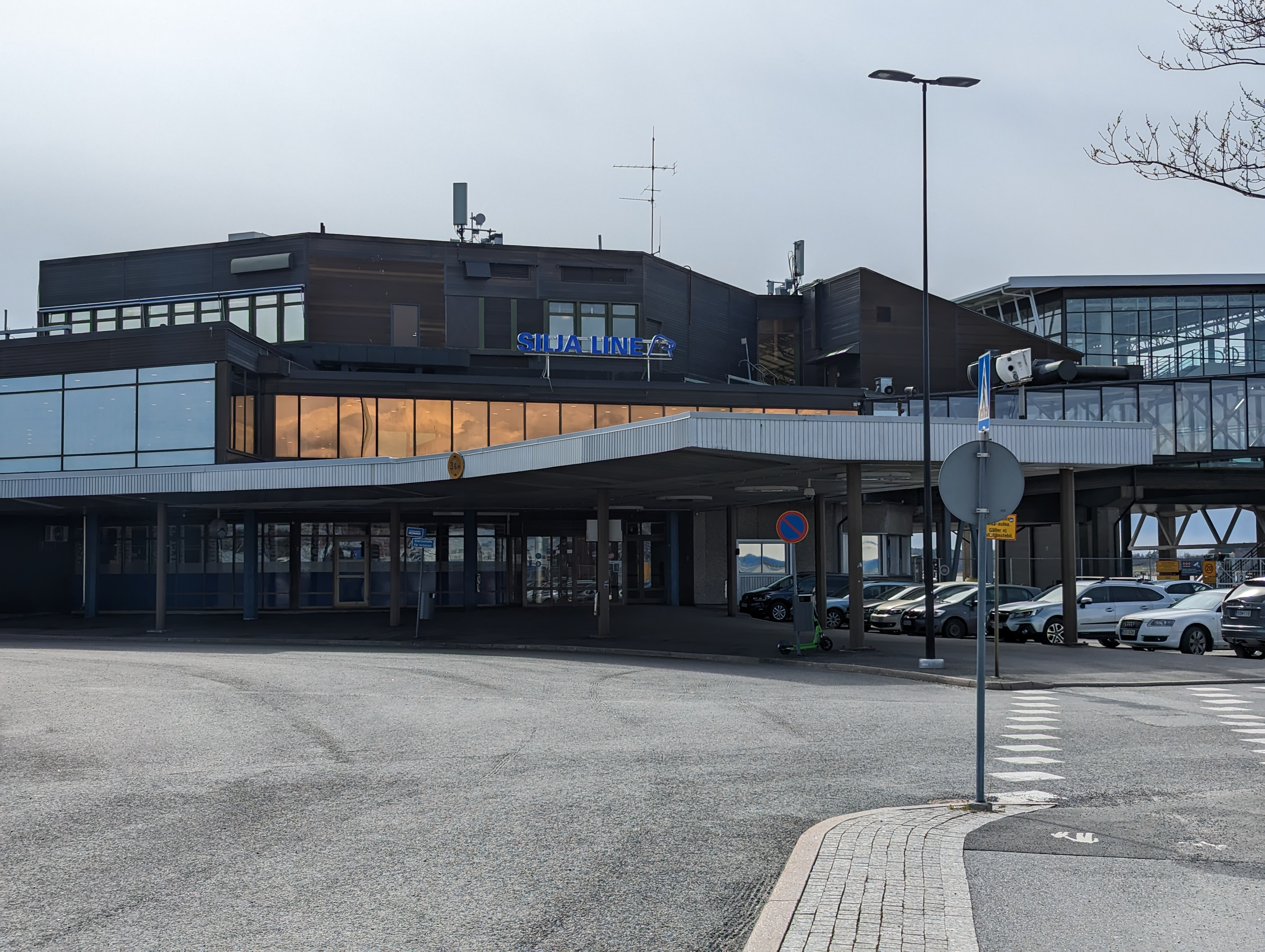
Silja Line terminal in Turku, Finland

Finland

- Helsinki: Olympia Terminal. Served by Helsinki tram lines 2 and 3.
- Turku: Linnansatama. Served by the Port of Turku railway station and bus line 1.
- Mariehamn: Västra Hamnen. Served by the Mariehamn city bus.
- Lumparland: Långnäs.

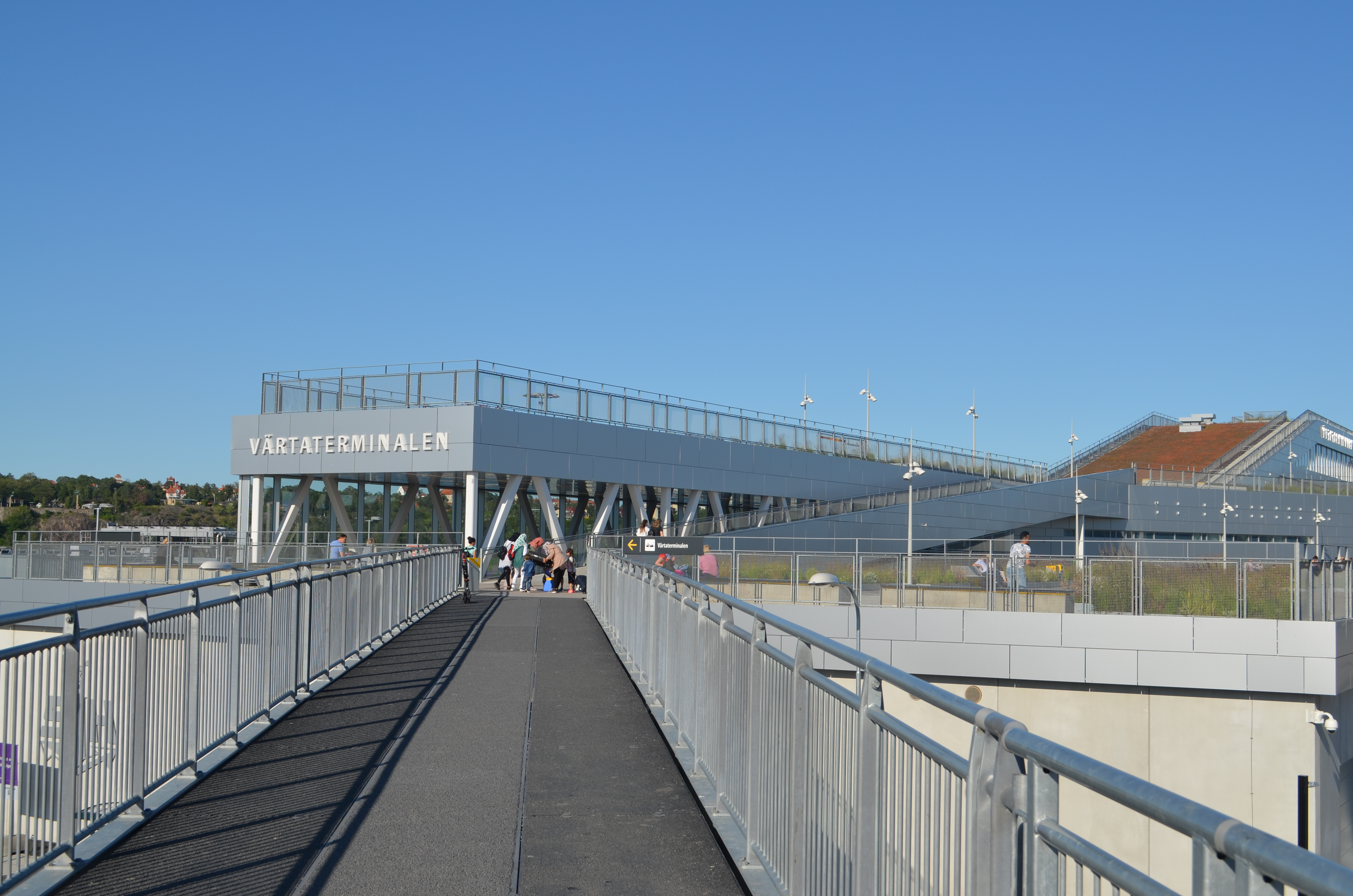
Silja Line terminal in Stockholm, Sweden

Sweden

- Stockholm: Värtahamnen.

== Mascot ==
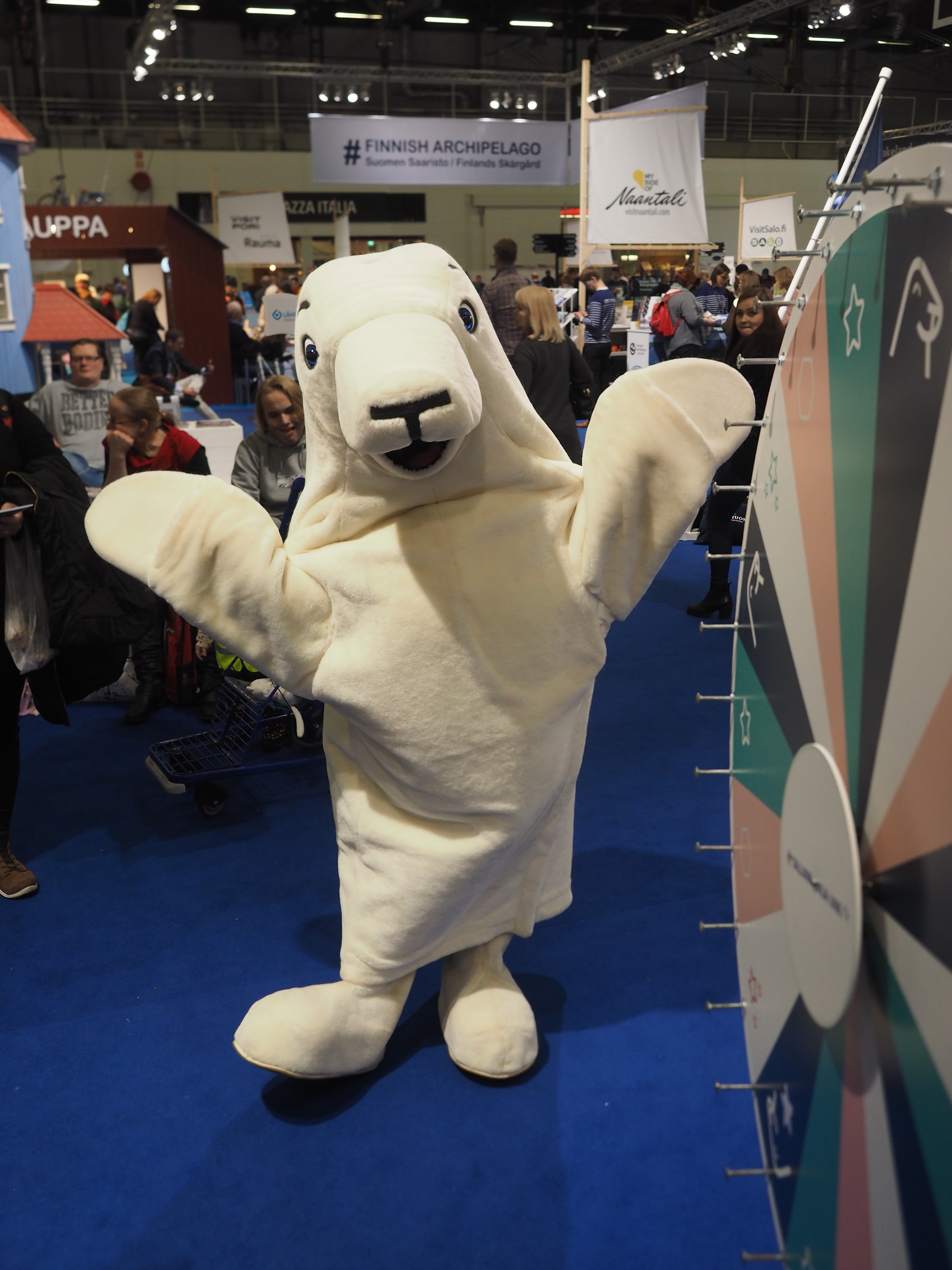
Harri Hylje

Harri Hylje (Harry the Seal) is Silja Line's seal mascot and the company's signature animal appearing in its logo. A living Harri Hylje figure appears on Silja Line ships especially on weekends and on school holiday periods.

=== History ===
The seal logo originated in 1967, allegedly half-accidentally from word play. During a brainstorming meeting among the marketing department, someone said in Swedish: "Who could bring some comfort for a thirsty soul?" The Swedish word for "soul" is själ, and in the archipelago it is pronounced similarly to the word for "seal", which is säl. The company name Silja Line had not yet been invented at the time, instead the cooperating shipping companies Bore, Effoa and Svea used the marketing name Ruotsinlaivat ("The ships to Sweden") in Finland and De Samseglande Finlandsbåtarna ("The ships to Finland sailing together") in Sweden.

At first the seal figure in the company's advertisements had multiple appearances: it swam along the ships, jumped in the water, sometimes even wore sunglasses and looked different depending on the artist in Finnish and Swedish marketing. At the start of the 1970s, when the marketing name Silja Line was taken into use, the Finnish advertising graphic artist Viktor Kaltala and the Swedish Janne Sjöström spent a day and a half together to come up with a common seal character for the Silja Line Logo. The Silja Line seal logo has since been altered at least in 1972, 2012 and 2014.

In spring 2009 Tallink Silja donated one euro for each Harri Hylje mascot sold on board Silja Line ships to the WWF Finland Baltic Sea campaign Operaatio Merenneito ("Operation Mermaid"). The total amount of donations rose up to 11 thousand euro.

In autumn 2014 Tallink Silja, the advertising company Hasan & Partners and the outdoor advertising company JCDecaux produced an interactive advertising campaign based on the Harri Hylje figure at the tram stop outside the Helsinki Central railway station. Citizens could play or take selfies with a remotely controlled Harri Hylje figure shown on a video screen. The device printed gift cards for ferry cruises as a reward.

In 2018 the play equipment manufacturer Lappset produced Harri Hylje themed play ships for the Silja Serenade and the Silja Symphony.

== See also ==
- Finnish maritime cluster
- List of companies of Finland
- SeaRail – part-owned by Tallink Silja Oy
