= Baltic Princess =

2008 ferry

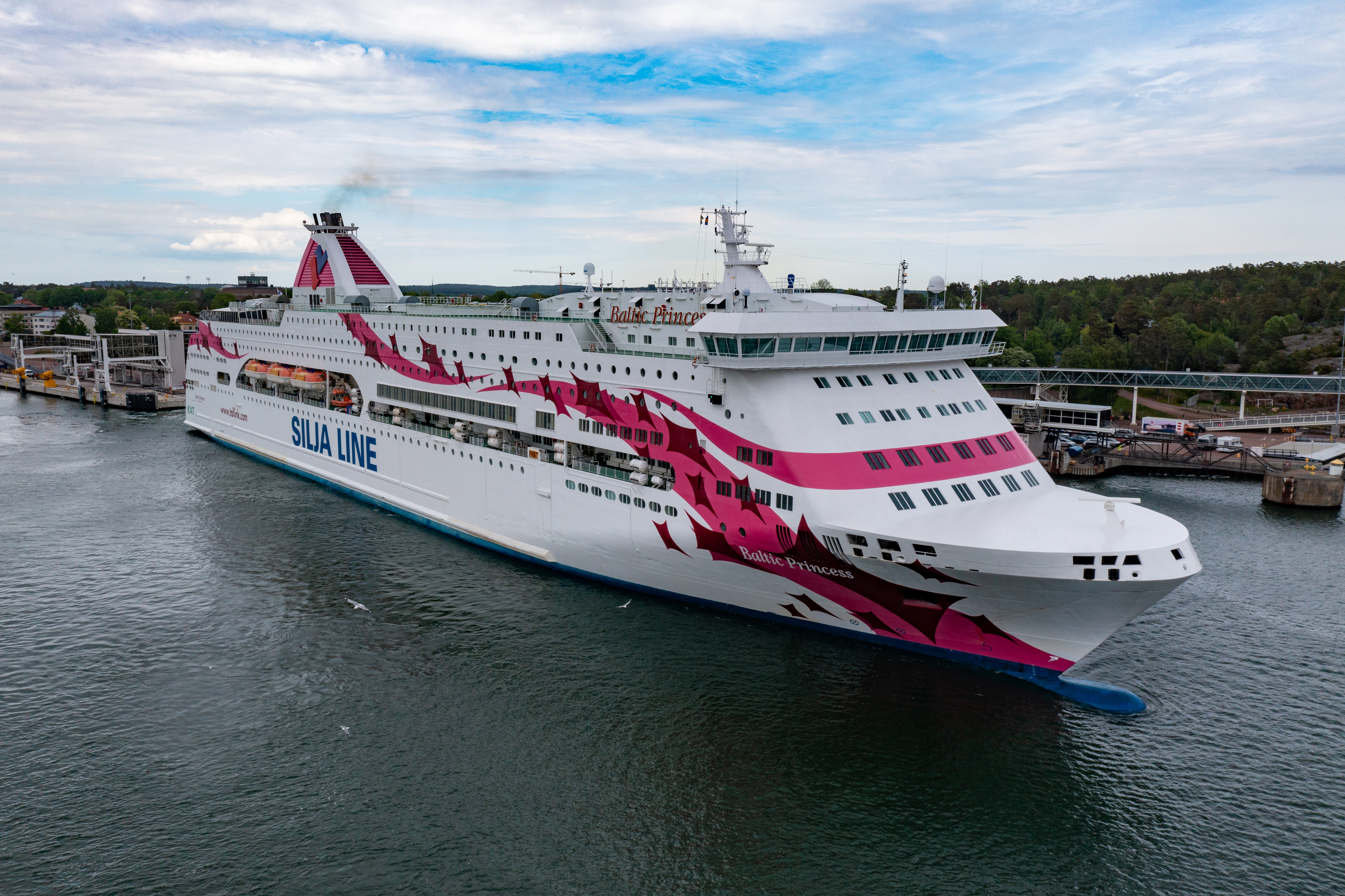
- Baltic Princess in Mariehamn Harbour, June 2022

History

Finland
- Name: Baltic Princess
- Owner: Tallink
- Operator: Silja Line
- Port of registry: 2013– Mariehamn, Finland 2008–13 Tallinn, Estonia
- Route: 2008–13: Helsinki–Tallinn; 2013–22: Turku–Mariehamn/Långnäs–Stockholm; 2022-June 2024: Turku–Långnäs–Kapellskär; June 2024 onwards: Turku–Mariehamn/Långnäs–Stockholm
- Ordered: 19 December 2005
- Builder: Aker Finnyards Helsinki New Shipyard, Finland (section of the hull built at Chantiers de l'Atlantique, France)
- Cost: €165 million
- Yard number: 1361
- Laid down: 14 November 2006 (at Chantiers de l'Atlantique)
- Launched: 9 March 2008 (from Helsinki New Shipyard)
- Christened: 6 March 2008 by Eva Hanschmidt
- Acquired: 10 July 2008
- Maiden voyage: 5 July 2008
- In service: 15 July 2008
- Identification: Call sign: OJQF; MMSI number: 230639000; IMO number: 9354284
- Status: In service

General characteristics
- Class & type: Galaxy class cruiseferry
- Tonnage: GT/ NT/ DWT. 48915/ 30860/ 6287
- Length: 212.10 m (695 ft 10 in)
- Beam: 29.00 m (95 ft)
- Decks: 12
- Ice class: 1 A Super
- Installed power: 4 × Wärtsilä 16V32 diesels; combined 32,000 kilowatts (43,000 hp)
- Speed: 24.5 kn (45.4 km/h; 28.2 mph)
- Capacity: 2,800 passengers; 2,500 berths; 420 cars; 1,130 lanemeters

Baltic Princess is a cruise ferry owned by the Estonia-based ferry operator Tallink and operated under their Silja Line brand. She was built by Aker Finnyards Helsinki New Shipyard in Helsinki, Finland in 2008. The ship began service on the cruise route between Helsinki, Finland to Tallinn, Estonia on 17 August 2008. From 1 February 2013 the ship began service on the Turku–Mariehamn–Stockholm route.

== Concept and construction ==
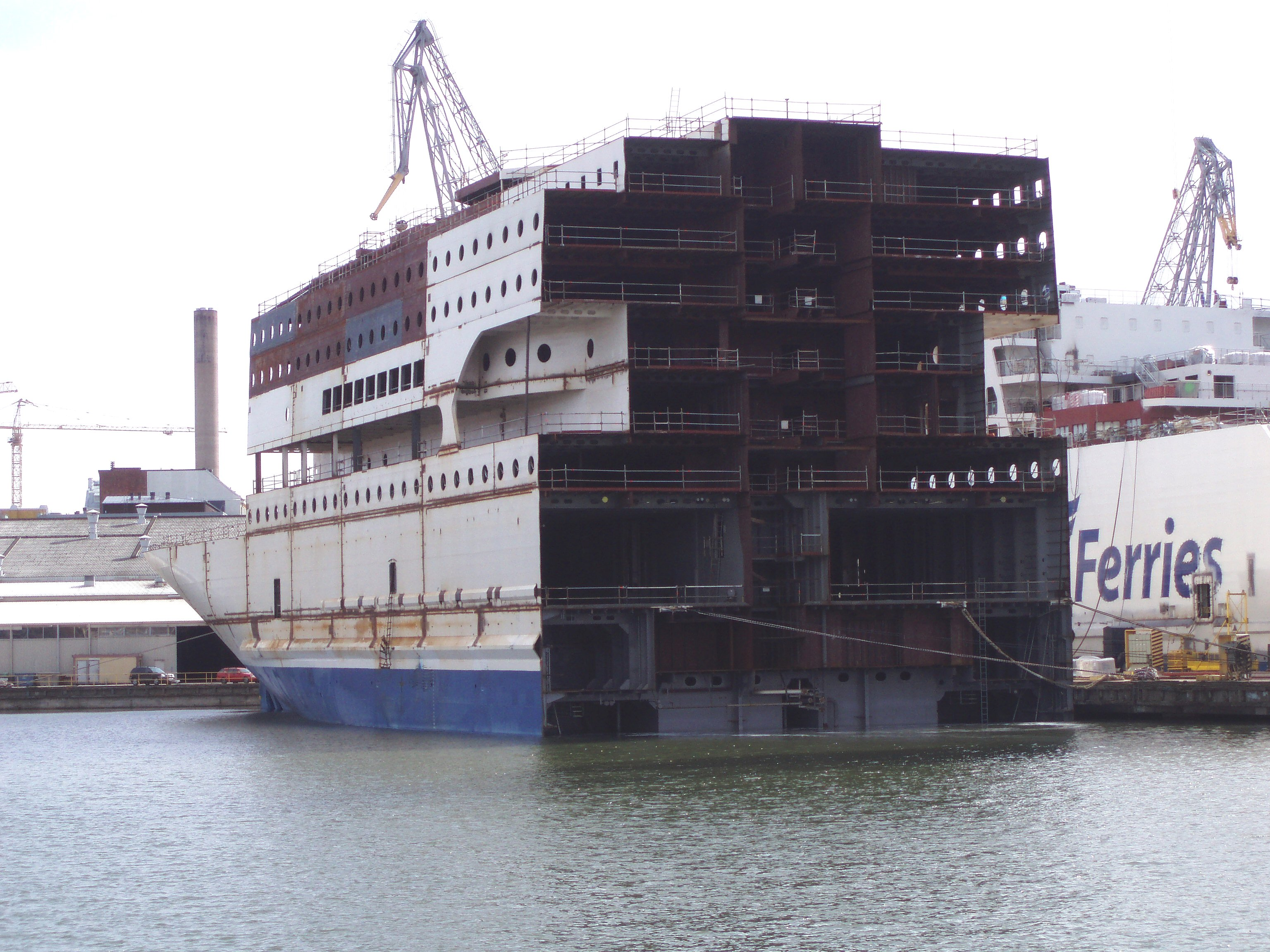
The forward section of Baltic Princess at Helsinki New Shipyard, March 2007

The Baltic Princess was ordered as Tallink's fourth new cruiseliner in December 2005. The purpose of the vessel was at the time undisclosed, but after Tallink's purchase of Silja Line in 2006 it was revealed that the ship would replace MS Galaxy on the Tallinn–Helsinki cruise route. The ship was christened on March 6, 2008.

The forward sections of the ship was constructed at Aker Yards' Chantiers de l'Atlantique shipyard in France and was towed to Helsinki in April 2007. In September the section was towed into the drydock where the hull was completed. The ship was floated out of drydock in Helsinki on 9 March 2008 after being officially christened.

== Service history ==
Baltic Princess was delivered to Tallink on 10 July 2008 and she entered the Tallinn–Helsinki route on 15 July 2008.

On 2 February 2013, Baltic Princess entered the Turku–Åland–Stockholm service and was re-flagged from Estonia to Finland. She was replaced on the Tallinn–Helsinki service by Silja Europa.
