= Promenade deck =

Deck found on several types of passenger ships and riverboats

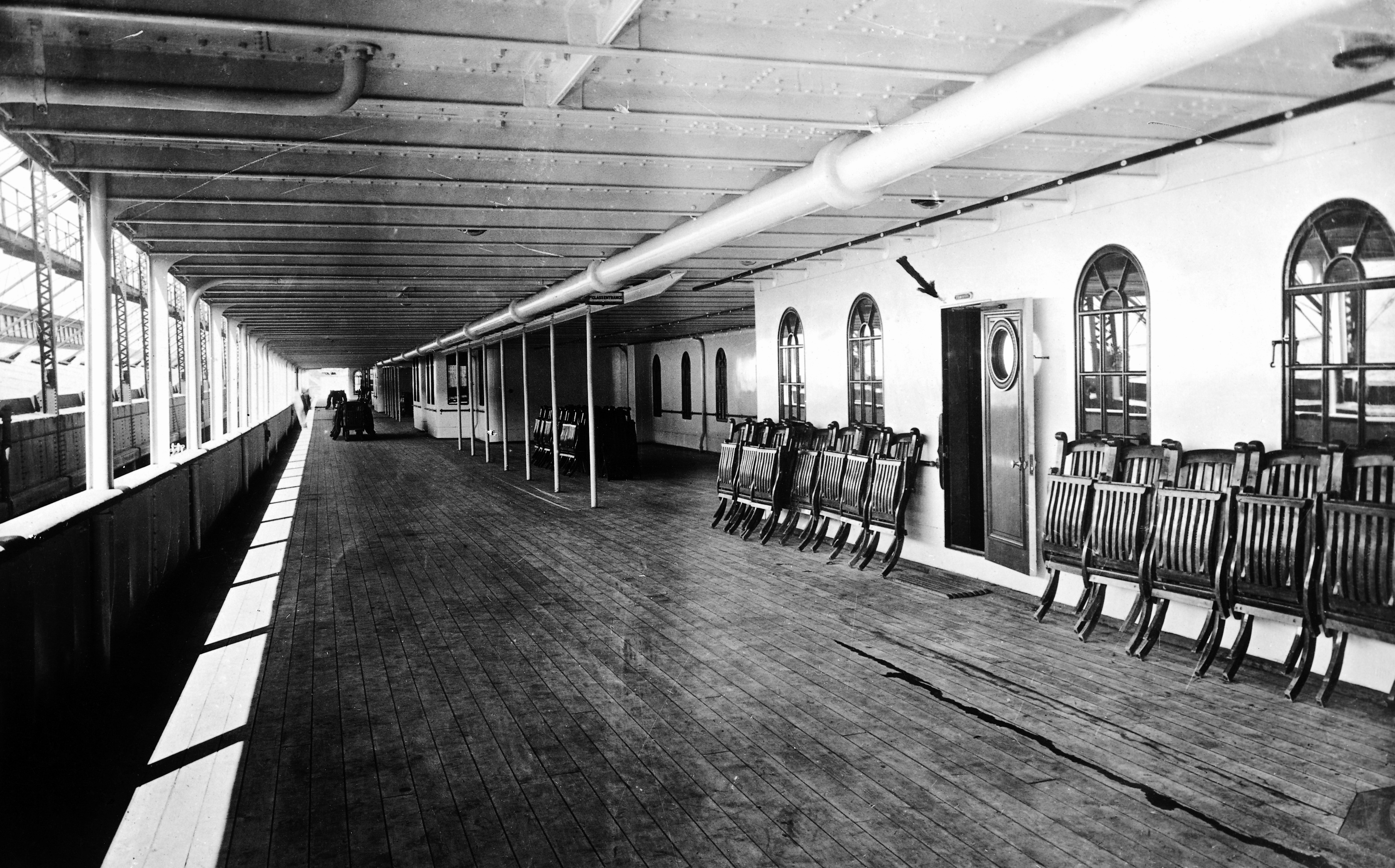
RMS Olympic's promenade deck

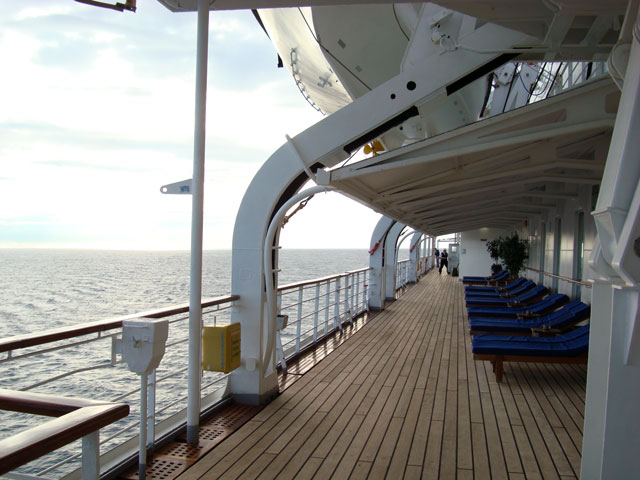
Promenade deck aboard TSS Fairsky.

The promenade deck is a deck found on several types of passenger ships and riverboats. It usually extends from bow to stern, on both sides, and includes areas open to the outside, resulting in a continuous outside walkway suitable for promenading (i.e., walking), thus the name.

On older passenger ships, the promenade deck was simply the top outside deck below the superstructure, and was enclosed by a railing. Lifeboats are typically kept on davits accessible from the promenade. A 1919 glossary of marine terminology defined the promenade deck as a deck above the ship's saloon, usually for the exclusive use of first-class passengers.

On a Mississippi riverboat, the promenade deck is the second deck, or floor, up from the waterline, above the main deck, and below the texas deck.

On modern cruise ships with superstructures as high and broad as the hull, the promenade deck is often largely enclosed, with railing-lined "cutouts" and wooden decking to recall the old days. The promenade may be used for jogging as well as walking, and signs indicate the mileage.

== Centerline promenade ==
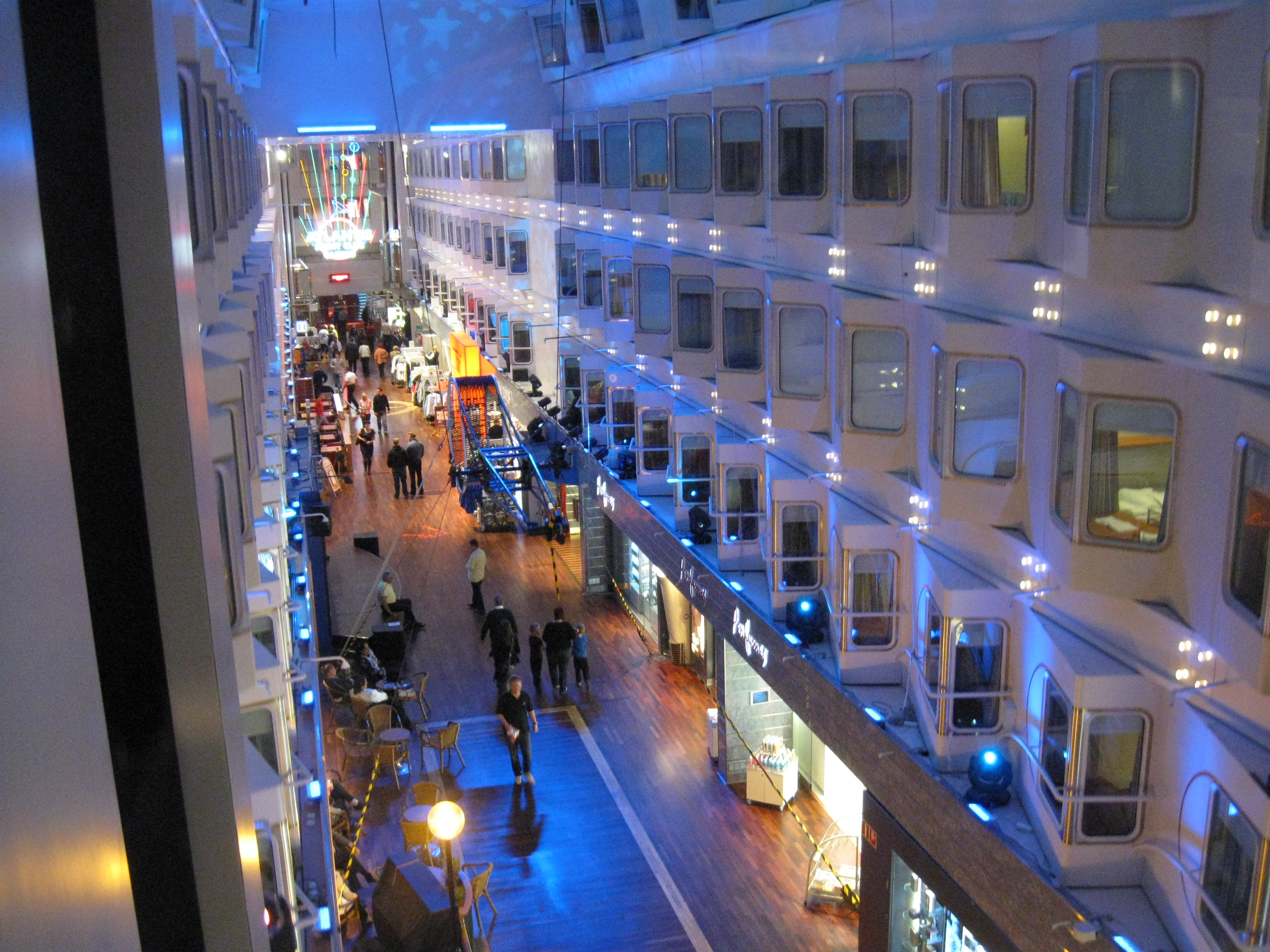
Interior promenade of the MS Silja Symphony

Many cruise ships and cruiseferries built by Aker Finnyards and its predecessor Kvaerner Masa-Yards have a wide, multi-deck promenade running along the center-line of the ship through most of the superstructure, also referred to as a horizontal atrium. This allows the majority of cabins on the upper decks to have a window, either to the port or starboard side or to the promenade. This design was first used in the cruiseferries MS Silja Serenade and MS Silja Symphony, built in 1990 and 1991, respectively. This was notably carried onto the Voyager-class, Freedom-class and the Oasis-class cruise ships operated by Royal Caribbean International, where it is referred to as the Royal Promenade.
