= Silja Symphony =

1991 ferry

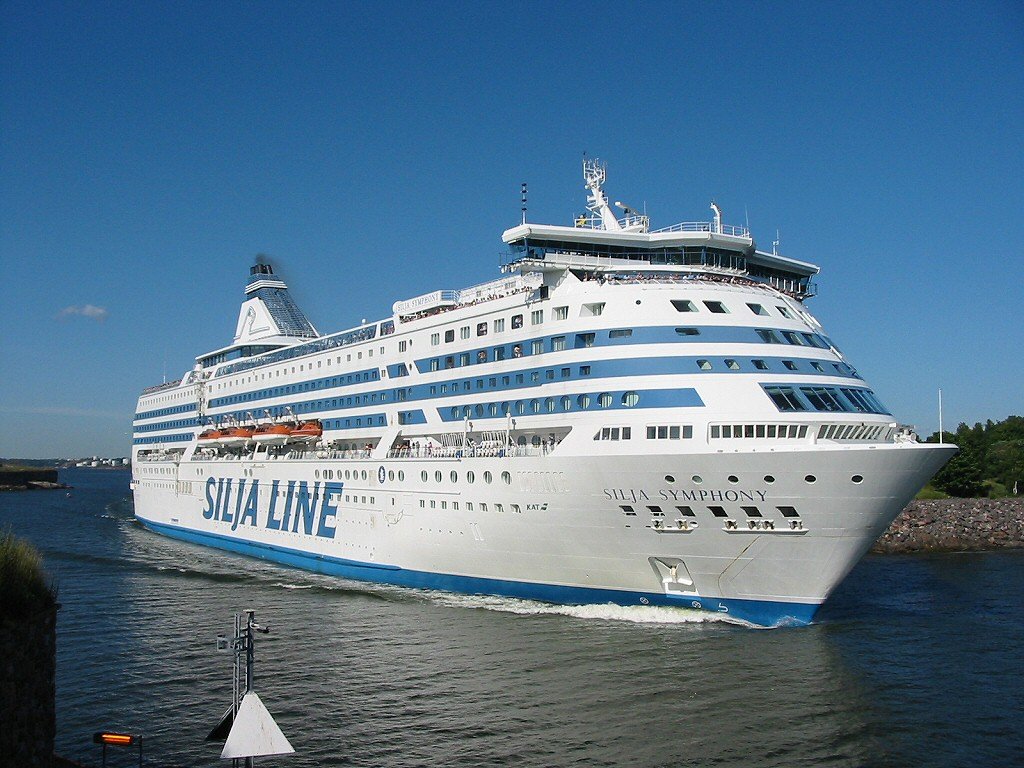
- Silja Symphony in Kustaanmiekka

History

Sweden
- Name: Silja Symphony
- Owner: Tallink Group
- Operator: Silja Line
- Port of registry: Stockholm, Sweden
- Route: Stockholm–Mariehamn–Helsinki
- Builder: Masa-Yards Turku New Shipyard, Finland
- Launched: 15 May 1990
- In service: 1991
- Identification: IMO number: 8803769
- Status: in active service

General characteristics
- Type: Cruiseferry
- Tonnage: 58,377 GT
- Length: 203.03 m (666 ft 1 in)
- Beam: 31.93 m (104 ft 9 in)
- Draught: 7.12 m (23 ft 4 in)
- Decks: 13
- Ramps: 3
- Ice class: 1 A Super
- Propulsion: 4 × Wärtsilä-Vasa 9R46 diesel engines, 32,500 kW (43,583 hp)
- Speed: 23 knots (43 km/h; 26 mph)
- Capacity: 2,626 passengers (originally) 2,852 (currently); 986 cabins; 450 vehicles (950 lane meters)

Silja Symphony is a cruiseferry owned by the Estonian shipping company Tallink Group, operated under their Silja Line brand on a route connecting Helsinki, Finland to Stockholm, Sweden via Mariehamn. She was built in 1991 at Masa-Yards Turku New Shipyard, Finland.

== History ==
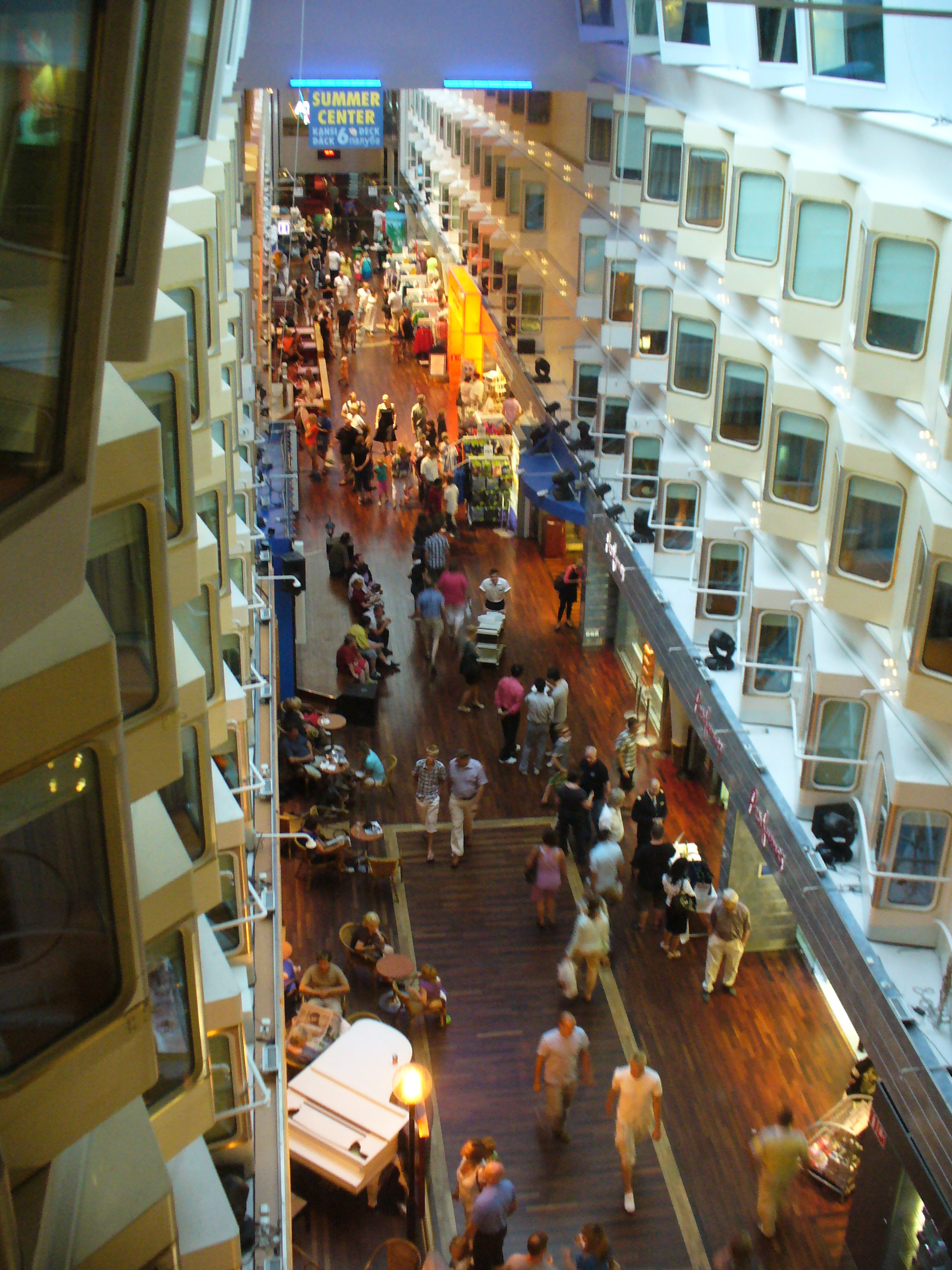
Interior view of Silja Symphony during a Helsinki-Stockholm cruise

While the Silja Symphony was being built, the Wärtsilä Marine shipyard went bankrupt, and as a result she was delivered several months behind schedule on 30 May 1991. On 1 June she was put on the route Helsinki–Stockholm. The new ships, the first ones to have a centerline promenade inside the ship, were highly popular but also proved to be somewhat expensive to operate. Unlike her sister, Silja Serenade, the Symphony's funnel was constructed of aluminium, which made the ship less heavy. Silja Symphony was also the third ship to arrive at the scene of the MS Estonia disaster on 28 September 1994.

On 7 February 1996, the ship was grounded in the Stockholm archipelago. In December of the same year her engines were upgraded with so-called water-spray technology that greatly reduced nitrogen oxide emissions. In order to keep tax free sales on the Helsinki–Stockholm ships when the EU changed its tax free legislation, a stop at Mariehamn was added to the route in June 1999. On 6 August 2001, a swarm of fish got sucked into the ship's cooling water intakes, which resulted in the engines shutting down due to overheating. Due to the engine problem the ship arrived in Helsinki some 1½ hours late.

In January 2004 the ship made two special cruises to Tallinn, Estonia for the Finnish company SOK. Similar cruises were made again in January 2005. In January–February 2006, just prior to the sale of Silja Line to Tallink, the Symphony and her sister had their interiors extensively rebuilt at Turku Repair Yard, Naantali. During a storm on 9 January 2007 the Symphony accidentally rammed a boarding tube in the port of Mariehamn, resulting in approximately €600,000 worth of damage.

There are some small external differences by which the Symphony can be told apart from her sister: the outer decks on the Symphony are painted light blue (they are green on the Serenade), and the light box with the ship's name on it is white on the Symphony, but blue on the Serenade.

Silja Symphony reportedly started using official electronic logbooks in June 2023.

Preceded by Silja Serenade	World's Largest Cruiseferry; 1991–1993	Succeeded by Silja Europa
