= Iscomar =

Compania Iscomar S.A.
- Founded: 1979
- Defunct: September 2016
- Headquarters: Palma, Balearic Islands
- Area served: Mediterranean Sea
- Services: Passenger transportation Freight transportation
- Parent: Contenemar Group
- Website: www.iscomar.com

Iscomar (Compania Iscomar S.A.) was a company which operated a single ferry service between Alcudia on the Balearic island of Mallorca and Ciutadella on the Balearic island of Menorca. It used to operate ferry services from the Balearic's to the Spanish mainland. After 2009, Iscomar stopped operating all of its routes except its Alcudia - Ciutadella service. In September 2016, Iscomar closed down after operating for 37 years.

== History ==
Iscomar began operations in 1979 with a small fleet of container ships. In 1998 Iscomar commenced a passenger service between Alcudia and Ciutadella using the Japanese built MS Nura Nova. A fast ferry was acquired in 2005 to operate between Ibiza Town and Formentera. In 2008, Isabel del Mar joined the feel, but as of June 2012, she was laid up in Barcelona. In October 2009, the insolvent state of the company led to it being banned from operating into or out of the port of Barcelona.

On 26 August 2016, Iscomar announced that it would close its only route between Alcudia and Ciutadella and would subsequently close down for good. The Nura Nova sailed the route, for Iscomar, for the last time on 11 September 2016. This marked the end of Iscomar after operating around the Balearic islands for over 30 years. Iscomar blamed the route closure on too much competition on an already crowded route. At the time of closure, Balearia operated three ships on the route and Trasmediterranea operated one ship on the route.

== Routes ==
The company operated the following route:

- Alcudia - Ciutadella

== Fleet ==
Iscomar operated the sole vessel 'Nura Nova.'

| Name | Built | Entered service | Route | Passengers | Tonnage | Flag |
|---|---|---|---|---|---|---|
| Nura Nova | 1977 | 1998 | Alcudia-Ciutadella | 377 | 3,134 GT | Spain |
