= Johnson Line (company) =

Swedish shipping line

Johnson Line (Swedish: Johnsonlinjen) was a Swedish shipping line founded in 1904 as a subsidiary of Rederi AB Nordstjernan. In 1982 Johnson Line absorbed Rederi AB Svea, another Rederi AB Nordstjernan -owned company, hence becoming a member of the Finnish-Swedish Silja Line consortium. Johnson Line ceased existing as an independent company in 1990 when it merged with the fellow Silja Line member to Effoa to form EffJohn.
