= Finland Steamship Company =

Finnish shipping company

Finland Steamship Company / Effoa
- House flag
- Industry: Cargo and passenger shipping
- Founded: 1883
- Defunct: 1990
- Fate: Merger
- Successor: EffJohn
- Headquarters: Helsinki, Finland
- Subsidiaries: Silja Line; Finncarriers; Finnlines

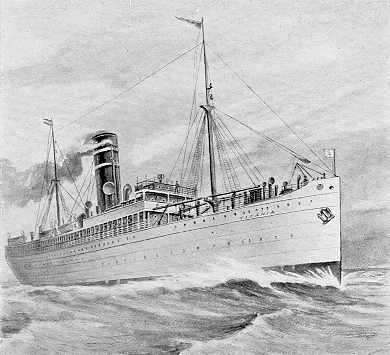
Titania, an FÅA ship that sailed on Helsinki/Hanko – Copenhagen – Hull in the early 20th century.

Finland Steamship Company (Swedish: Finska Ångfartygs Aktiebolag, abbreviated FÅA, Finnish: Suomen Höyrylaiva Osakeyhtiö, abbreviated SHO) was a Finnish shipping company founded in 1883 by Captain Lars Krogius. In Finnish and Swedish, the company was usually referred to simply as FÅA. In 1976, the company changed its name to Effoa, a phonetic spelling of the abbreviation FÅA.

The company was a founding member of the Silja Line consortium. In 1975 FÅA founded Finncarriers together with Finnlines as a joint freight operations venture. At the same time FÅA gave up passenger traffic between Finland and Germany, the ships used on the route were sold to Finnlines. In the 1980s both Finncarriers and Finnlines became fully owned subsidiaries of Effoa. In 1989 Effoa decided to give up its freight-carrying operations, and its shares of Finnlines were transferred to Effoa's owners. Effoa stopped trading as an independent company in 1990 when its freight operations were demerged to form an independent Finnlines, while the passenger operations were merged with Johnson Line (the other partner in Silja Line at the time) to form EffJohn.

In 1945, FÅA was the first company post-World War II to restart passenger traffic between Helsinki and Stockholm, using Wellamo. The same ship was also the first to start passenger traffic between Helsinki and Tallinn after World War II in 1965.

== Ships ==
- Arcturus (1899–57) — Passenger ship that operated primarily on the Hanko – Copenhagen – Hull route.
- Oberon (1925–30) — Sunk when Arcturus collided with it in fog.
- Wellamo (1927–67) — Restarted Helsinki – Stockholm and Helsinki – Tallinn traffic after World War II. Scrapped in 1969.
- Ilmatar (1964–80) — Later the casino cruise ship Palm Beach Princess. Scrapped in 2011.
- Finlandia (1967–76) — Effoa's first modern car/passenger ferry. Scrapped in 2009.
- Aallotar (1972–78) — First ship to start year-round traffic between Helsinki and Stockholm. Scrapped in 2004.
- Finlandia (1981–90) — Largest cruiseferry of her time. Later Queen of Scandinavia of DFDS Seaways.
- Finnjet (1986–90) — Bought from Enso-Gutzeit. The longest and fastest cruise ferry of her time, and still fastest as of 2008.
