= Mano (name) =

Mano is both a given name and a surname. Notable people with the name include:

== Given name ==
- Mano (Mozambican footballer) (born 1984), real name Celso Halilo de Abdul
- Mano (Portuguese footballer) (born 1987), real name Luís Miguel Lopes Mendes
- Mano (singer) (born 1965), stage name of Indian playback singer Nagoor Babu
- Major Mano, a senior Tamil Tigers commander
- Manó Andrássy (1821–1891), Hungarian painter, caricaturist, collector, traveler and politician
- Mano Brown, vocalist from Racionais MC's
- Mano Dayak (1949–1995), Tuareg leader
- Mano Ganesan (born 1959), Sri Lankan politician
- Manó Kogutowicz (1851–1908), Hungarian cartographer
- Mano Menezes (born 1962), Brazilian football coach
- Manó Széchényi (1858–1926), Hungarian politician
- Mano Wijeyeratne (1957–2011), Sri Lankan politician

== Surname ==
- Eloisa Biasotto Mano (1924–2019), Brazilian chemist, professor
- Erina Mano (born 1991), the solo artist for Hello!Project
- Kyoko Mano (真野 郷子; born 1956), Japanese gymnast
- Mordechai Mano (1922–1969), Israeli businessman
- Moshe Mano (born 1955), Israeli businessman
- Yukari Mano (born 1994), Japanese field hockey player

== See also ==
- Mano (disambiguation)
