= Mano =

Mano may refer to:

== People ==
- Mano people, an ethnic group in Liberia
- Mano (name), a list of people with either the given name or surname
- Mano (Mozambican footballer), Celso Halilo de Abdul (born 1984)
- Mano (Portuguese footballer), Luís Miguel Lopes Mendes (born 1987)
- Mano (singer), stage name of Indian playback singer Nagoor Babu (born 1965)

== Places ==
- Mano, Landes, a commune in France
- Mano, Niigata, a town in Japan
- Mano, Sierra Leone, a town
- Mano River, a river in Guinea, Liberia and Sierra Leone
- Mandø, a Danish island formerly often spelled Manø
- Mano, Mozambique, a former capital in the Maravi Empire

== Other uses ==
- Mano language, spoken by the Mano people
- Movement of Organized Nationalist Action (Movimiento de Acción Nacionalista Organizado), a former Guatemalan paramilitary group
- Mano (comics), a comic book supervillain
- Mano (film) a 2007 film about Hector Lavoe
- Mano (stone), a type of hand stone used to grind grain
- Mano (gesture), a Filipino gesture of respect
- Mano (mythology), a female deity in Sámi mythology
- Mano Maritime, an Israeli cruise line
- Mano machine, a theoretical computer described by M. Morris Mano

== See also ==
- Manos (disambiguation)
- Manno, a Swiss municipality
- Mannō, Kagawa, a Japanese town
