= Manos =

Manos may refer to:

== Films ==
- The Hands (film) (Spanish: Las manos), a 2006 Argentinean-Italian film
- Manos: The Hands of Fate, 1966 horror film

== Other uses ==
- Manos (album), by The Spinanes
- Manos (name)
- Mano (stone) or manos, a stone tool used to grind and process food
- Manos: The Hands of Fate (video game), a 2012 video game based on the film
- Monte Manos, a mountain of Lombardy, Italy
- Manos (YouTuber) , Greek YouTuber known for his comedy videos, skits and music

== See also ==
- En Tus Manos (disambiguation)
- Mano (disambiguation)
