= Mirage I =

Cruiseferry built for Fred. Olsen & Co.

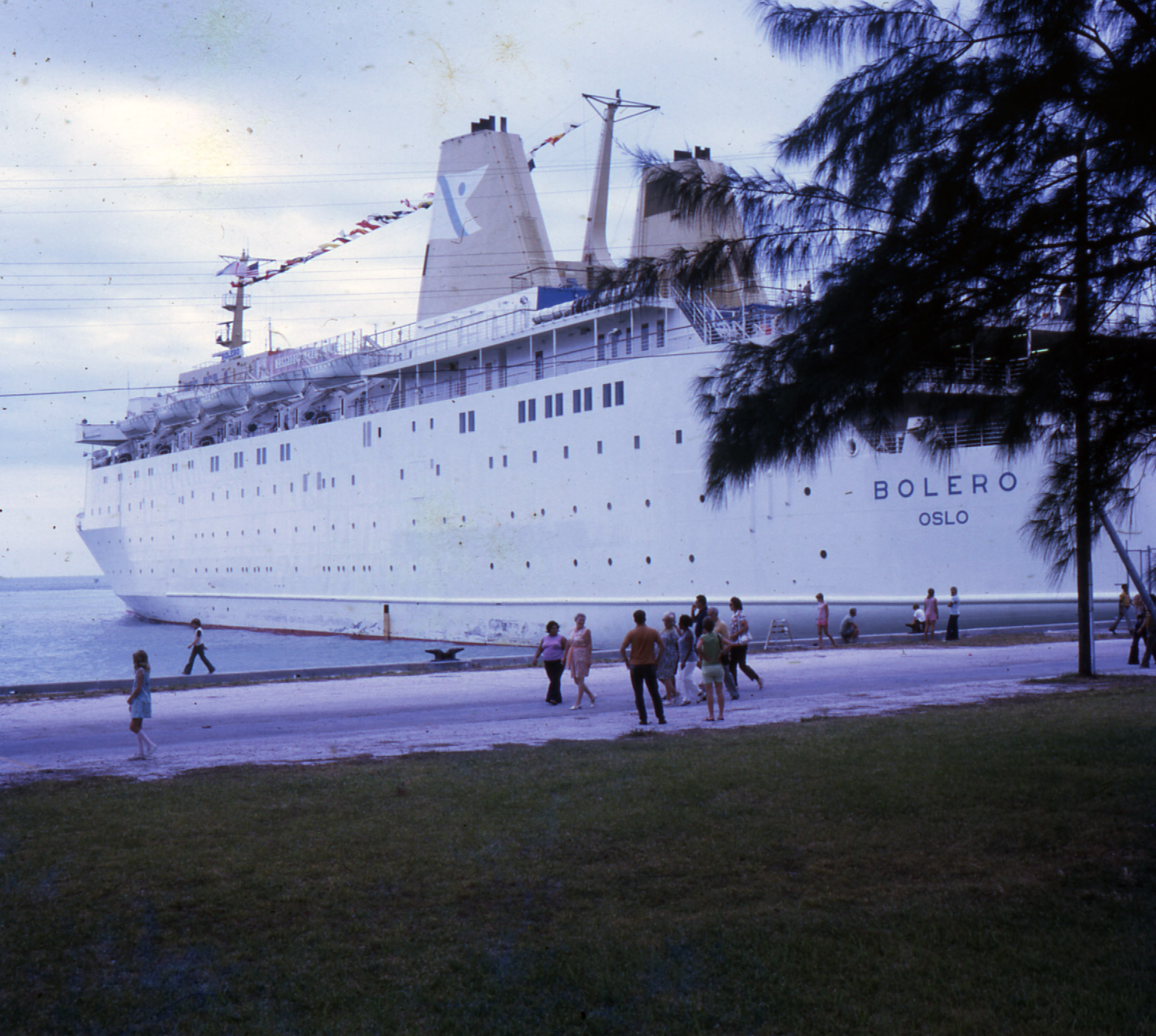
- Cruise ship Bolero at Trumbo Point, Key West in the late 1970s.

History
- Name: Mirage I
- Owner: Magic 1 Cruise Line Corp, Israel
- Builder: Dubegion-Normandie SA Prairie au doc, Nantes, France
- Laid down: 27 December 1971
- Launched: 13 June 1972
- Completed: 15 February 1973
- Identification: IMO number: 7221433
- Fate: Broken up

General characteristics
- Tonnage: 14,264 GT
- Length: 141.16 m (463 ft 1 in)
- Beam: 21.93 m (71 ft 11 in)
- Decks: 9
- Speed: 18 knots (33 km/h; 21 mph)
- Capacity: 1,600 passengers in 800 cabins, 245 cars, 22 trucks

Mirage I (formerly Magic I, Seminole Empress, Crucero Express, Jupiter, Bolero, Scandinavica and built as Bolero) was a cruiseferry built in 1973 in France for Fred. Olsen & Co. It was one of three sister ships, along with MS Royal Iris and MS Scandinavian Star.

During 2003 the ship operated as Ocean Club Cruises from Port Canaveral with 2-night cruises to Grand Bahama and 3-night cruises to Key West and Grand Bahama. In March 2004, it was bought by "Magic 1 Cruise Line Corp", a wholly owned subsidiary of Isramco, Inc. (Nasdaq: ISRL). It operated from the Port of Ashdod as Magic 1 until 2010.

In March 2012, it arrived at Aliağa, Turkey for dismantling, after being listed for sale for US$4,000,000.
