= Židlochovice =

- Town
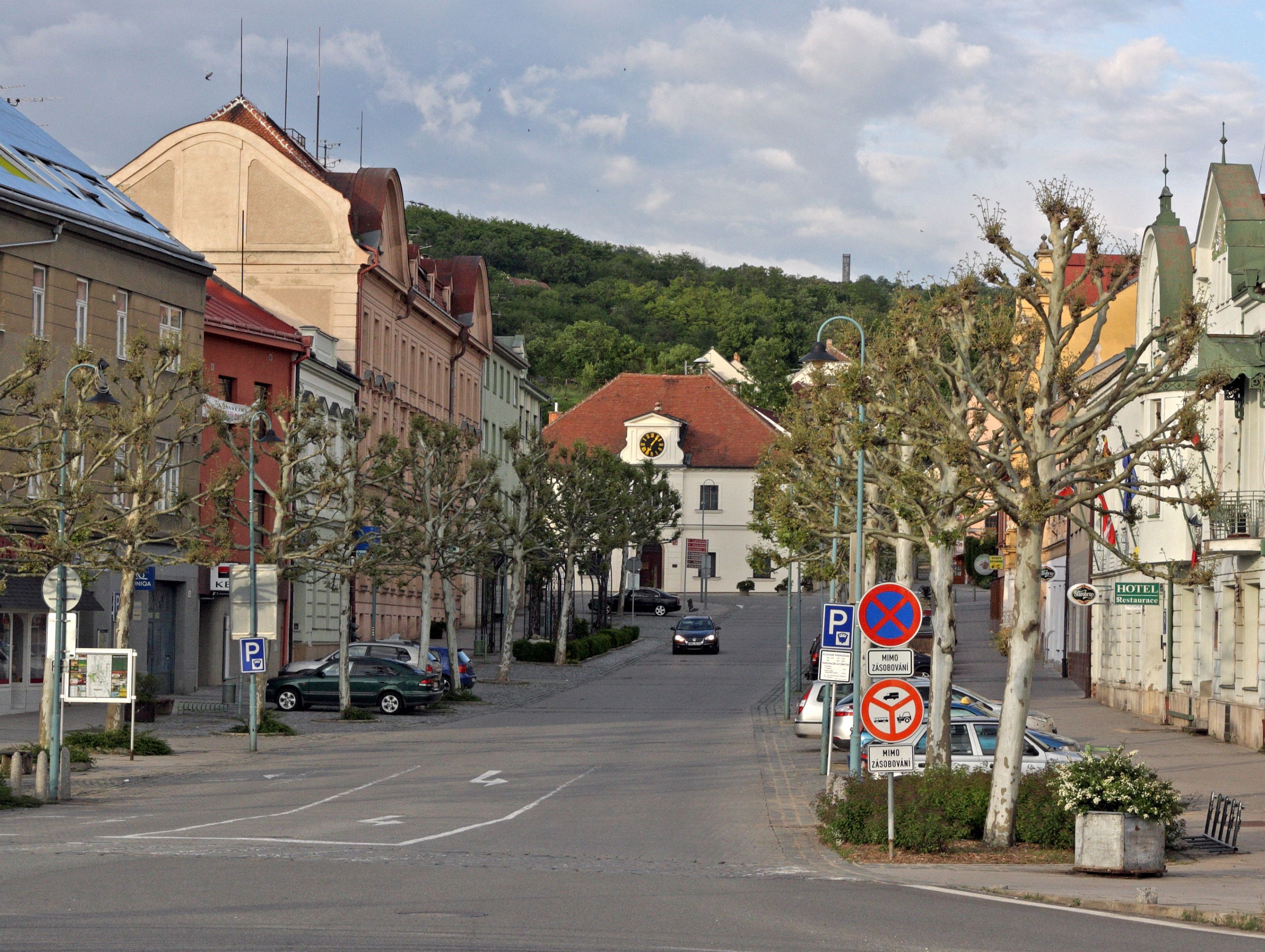
- Town square

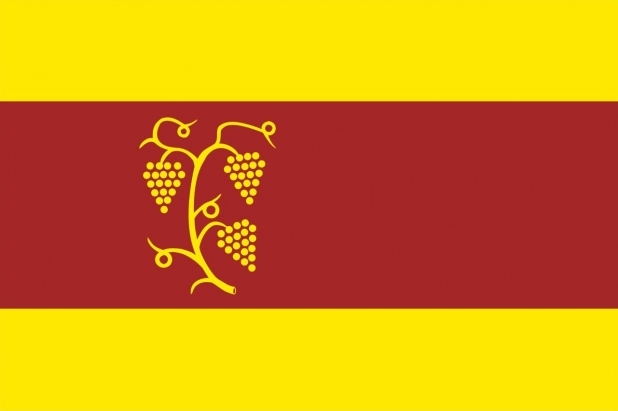
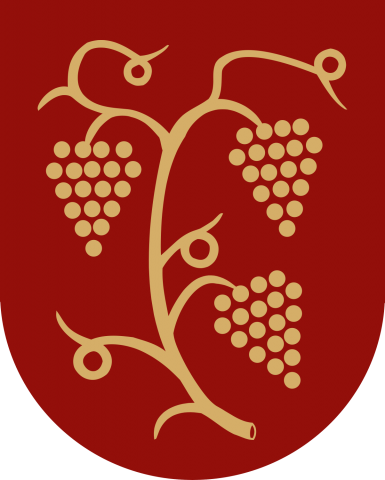
- Flag Coat of arms

- Location in the Czech Republic
- Coordinates: 49°2′22″N 16°37′8″E
- Country: Czech Republic
- Region: South Moravian
- District: Brno-Country
- First mentioned: 1237

Government
  - Mayor: Jan Vitula (TOP 09)

Area
  - Total: 5.95 km^{2} (2.30 sq mi)
- Elevation: 190 m (620 ft)

Population (2026-01-01)
  - Total: 3,662
  - Density: 615/km^{2} (1,590/sq mi)
- Time zone: UTC+1 (CET)
  - Summer (DST): UTC+2 (CEST)
- Postal code: 667 01
- Website: www.zidlochovice.cz

Židlochovice (Czech pronunciation: [ˈʒɪdloxovɪtsɛ]; German: Groß Seelowitz) is a town in Brno-Country District in the South Moravian Region of the Czech Republic. It has about 3,700 inhabitants. The town is located in the Dyje–Svratka Valley, at the confluence of the rivers Svratka and Litava.

Židlochovice was founded in the first half of the 13th century at the latest and it became a town in 1873. The main landmark of the town is the Židlochovice Castle.

== Etymology ==
According to one theory, the name is derived from Old Czech word židlina, meaning 'swamp'. According the second theory, the name is derived from the old personal Slavic name Židla or Židloch. The German name was derived from the Czech one.

== Geography ==
Židlochovice is located about 16 kilometres (10 mi) south of Brno. It lies in the Dyje–Svratka Valley. The highest point is the hill Výhon at 355 m (1,165 ft) above sea level. The town is situated in the valley of the Svratka River. The Litava River joins the Svratka in the town.

== History ==
The first written mention of Židlochovice is from 1237. Among the owners of the Židlochovice estate were the noble families of Pernštejn, Zierotin, Dietrichstein and Habsburg. In 1873, Židlochovice was promoted to a town.

== Demographics ==
Historical population

Year	Pop.	±%
1869	2,826	—
1880	2,651	−6.2%
1890	2,635	−0.6%
1900	2,613	−0.8%
1910	2,514	−3.8%

Year	Pop.	±%
1921	2,562	+1.9%
1930	2,764	+7.9%
1950	2,508	−9.3%
1961	2,782	+10.9%
1970	2,855	+2.6%

Year	Pop.	±%
1980	3,443	+20.6%
1991	3,251	−5.6%
2001	3,087	−5.0%
2011	3,562	+15.4%
2021	3,702	+3.9%

Source: Censuses

== Economy ==
Židlochovice is known for viticulture and wine-making. The town lies in the Velkopavlovická wine subregion.

== Transport ==
Židlochovice is the start and terminus of a railway line from/to Brno.

== Sights ==
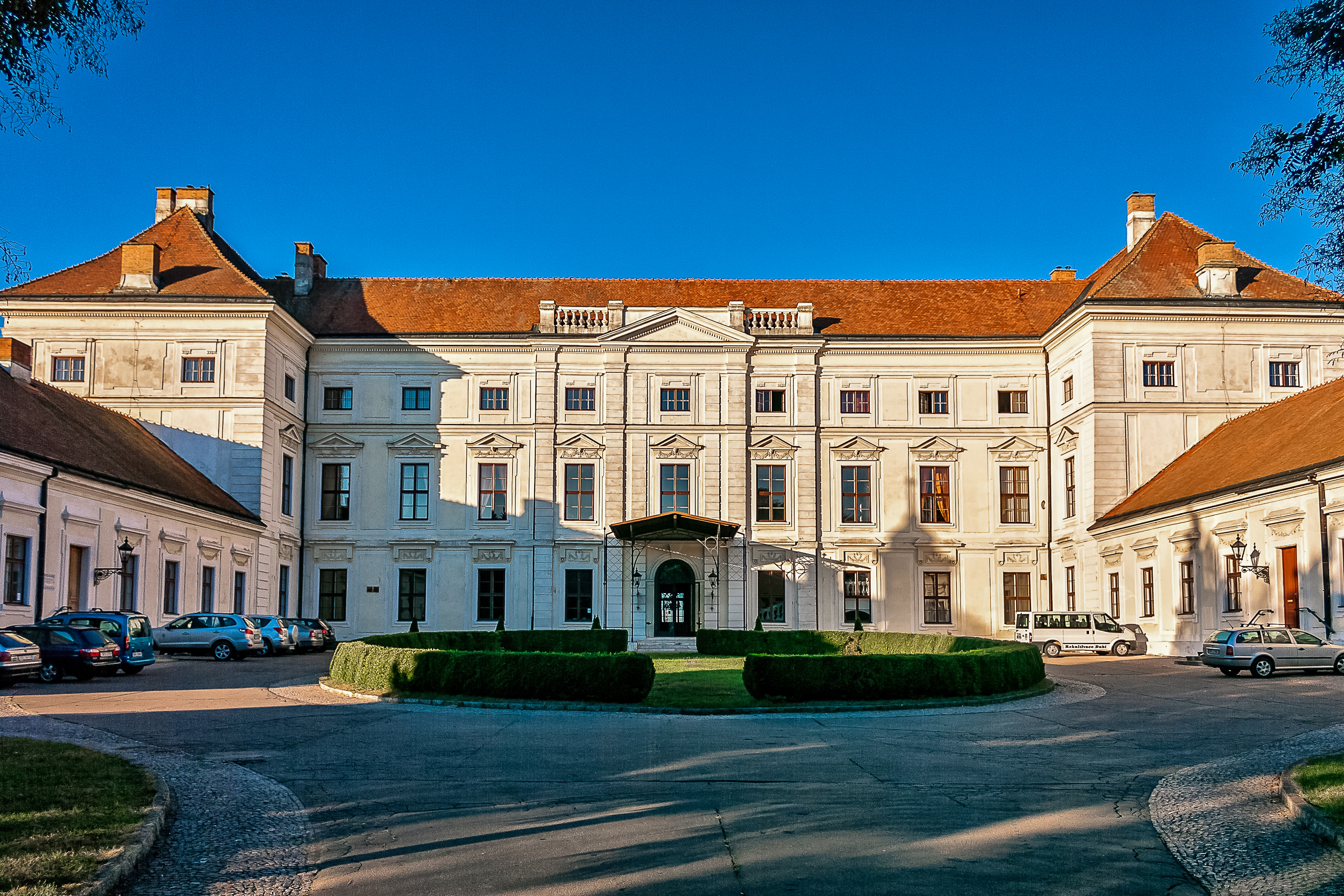
Židlochovice Castle

The main landmark of the town is the Židlochovice Castle. It was originally built in the 14th century as a water fortress, then it was gradually rebuilt into an aristocratic residence. The main reconstruction was the Baroque reconstruction that took place during the rule of Count Philipp Ludwig Wenzel von Sinzendorf between 1696 and 1742, who chose Židlochovice as his main seat. Today it is owned by a state company which takes care of the forests, and is not accessible to the public. The castle includes a 22 hectares (54 acres) large park, which was founded in the early 18th century and is freely accessible.

A notable building is the Church of the Exaltation of the Holy Cross. It was building in the Baroque style in the 1720s according to the design by Johann Lukas von Hildebrandt.

The town hall is originally a Renaissance house, rebuilt in the 18th and 19th centuries.

== Notable people ==
- Jan IV of Pernštejn (1487–1548), nobleman; died here
- Wenzel von Linhart (1821–1877), Austrian surgeon
- Maurice Strakosch (1825–1887), American musician and impresario
- Manó Kogutowicz (1851–1908), Hungarian cartographer
- Archduke Friedrich, Duke of Teschen (1856–1936), nobleman and supreme commander
- Maria Christina of Austria (1858–1929), Queen of Spain
- Archduke Charles Stephen of Austria (1860–1933), nobleman and admiral
- Archduke Eugen of Austria (1863–1954), nobleman and army commander

== Twin towns – sister cities ==
Židlochovice is twinned with:

- Gbely, Slovakia
- Montevago, Italy
