= MS Bore =

Passenger ship built in 1960

Coordinates: 60.4350°N 22.2337°E

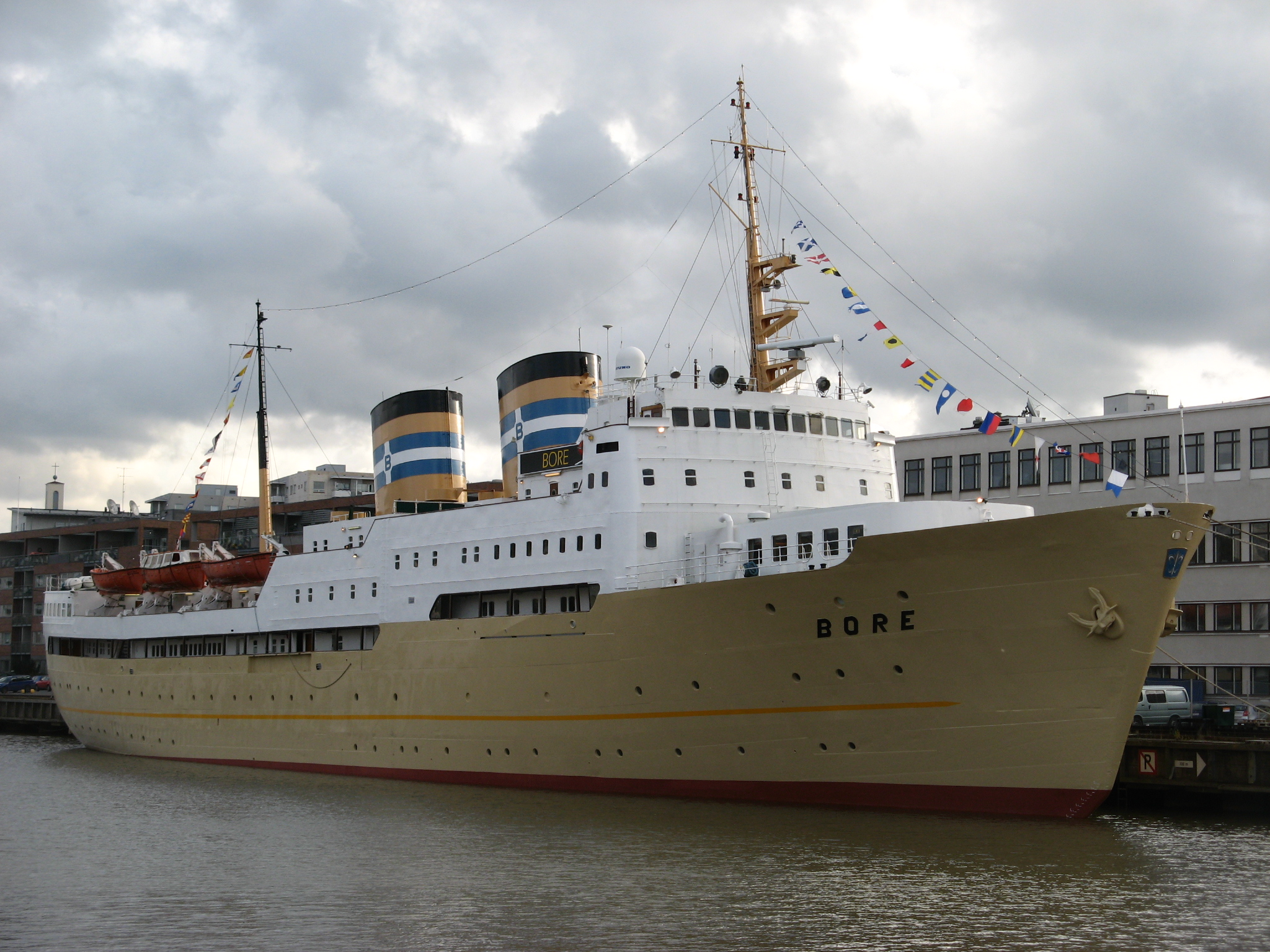
- Bore in her restored original livery in Turku, Finland

History

Finland
- Name: 1960–77: Bore; 1977–87: Borea; 1988–2010: Kristina Regina; 2010 onwards: Bore
- Owner: 1960–77: Bore Steamship Company; 1977–84: Jakob Lines; 1984–87: Helsingfors Steamship Company; 1987–2010: Kristina Cruises; 2010 onwards: Oy S/S Borea Ab
- Operator: 1960–70: Bore Steamship Company; 1970–76: Silja Line; 1977–84: Jakob Lines; 1984: Aura Line; 1984–87: laid up; 1987–2010: Kristina Cruises; 2010 onwards: laid up as a hotel ship
- Port of registry: 1960–77: Turku, Finland; 1977–84: Jakobstad, Finland; 1984–87: Helsinki, Finland; 1987 onwards: Kotka, Finland
- Builder: Oskarshamn Shipyard
- Yard number: 353
- Launched: 19 March 1959
- Completed: 1960
- In service: 1960
- Out of service: 2010
- Identification: Call sign: OGBF; IMO number: 5048485; MMSI number: 230132000
- Status: Permanent hotel/restaurant/museum ship at Forum Marinum

General characteristics
- Tonnage: 3,492 GRT (1960); 4,295 GT (1988)
- Length: 99.83 m (327.5 ft)
- Beam: 15.25 m (50.0 ft)
- Draught: 5.26 m (17.3 ft)
- Propulsion: As built it had four Babcock & Wilcox water tube boilers powering two Oskarshamns Varv/Gotaverken four-cylinder steam engines which drove twin screws. The original power plant was replaced in 1988 by two Wärtsilä 12V22 diesel engines of 2330 HP (1740 kW) each.
- Speed: Max 16 knots(1960); Service 14.5 knots. Max 17.5 knots. (1988)
- Capacity: 1028 passengers in two class accommodation. 333 berths. Approximately 65 cars. (1960); 742 passengers.(1972); 245 passengers, all in one class. 249 beds.(1988)

MS Bore is a retired Passenger ship docked permanently in Turku, Finland. She was originally built in 1960 by Oskarshamn shipyard, Oskarshamn, Sweden as the car/passenger ferry SS Bore for Steamship Company Bore, Finland, then the last commercial steam ship built in Scandinavia and the first ferry on the route between Finland and Sweden where cars could drive aboard. She was later known as SS Borea, before being rebuilt as a cruise ship in 1988. 1988 to 2010 she was owned by the Finnish shipping company Kristina Cruises and known as MS Kristina Regina until she was retired because she did not comply with new safety regulations.

== Design and construction ==
In the late 1950s the Finnish Bore Steamship Company identified the need for a new car/passenger ferry to transport passengers and vehicles between Finland and Sweden. The company was at the time collaborating with the Finland Steamship Company and Rederi AB Svea (this collaboration gave birth to Silja Line in 1970) to provide a pooled service between the two countries. The resulting SS Bore was in many aspects a traditional design with two large funnels, two masts, a promenade deck and steam power plant due to the influence of the company's largest shareholder, Hans von Rettig (1894–1979). Despite this it offered a ro-ro facility due to the presence of a large hatch on its starboard side which allowed vehicles to enter and exit the vessel.

The vessel had two classes (tourist and first class) with berths for 333 passengers and space for cars in a garage on B deck. The public rooms were designed by the architect Ulf Stenhammar and included a separate dining room and bar for each passenger class. The vessel was built at the Oskarshamn shipyard in Oskarshamn, Sweden and by the time it was delivered on 5 April 1960 to its owners it had become last passenger steamship ever to be built in Scandinavia.

== Service history ==
The Bore Steamship Company used the vessel between 1960 and 1976 providing overnight crossings on the Turku–Mariehamn–Stockholm route although she was often used on the Helsinki–Stockholm route as well. Most Bore Steamship Company's ships had a number in their name (Bore I of 1898, Bore II of 1906, and the Bore III of 1952), and the lack of number in the name of this ship led to it being nicknamed Nolla-Bore (Zero-Bore) by Finnish seamen. The establishment of the Silja Line in 1970 saw the ships in the fleet kept their own funnel colours, but with the Silja Line logo added. The ships which had been owned by the Finland Steamship Company and Svea Line were painted totally white after the merger, but the Bore kept her original corn-coloured hull.

In July 1970 while near Turku, the Bore collided with the Dutch ship Edda. There was no serious damage. In 1972 the ship was rebuilt with additional cabins, which reduced its passenger carrying capacity.

=== Service with the Jakob Line ===
The vessel ended service with the Silja Line in September 1976 having over the past 16 years on the route carried over 1,5 million passengers on 2,473 round trips. The vessel was then laid up in Stockholm until on 10 October 1977 when she was sold to Jakob Lines, a company in which Bore Steamship had a major shareholding. The vessel was renovated and renamed SS Borea. In 1978, the Borea started operating between Jakobstad and Skellefteå. Generally Jakob Lines only operated her during the summer months, the rest of the year was spent either laid up or occasionally chartered to other companies, though some of which were not too successful. In January 1979, the Borea was chartered to house workers at an oilrig near the Scottish coast. The vessel returned to her sailings from September of that year. On another charter the vessel was used in Alger, Algeria to once again house workers.

=== Service with the Aura Line ===
Jakob Lines sold the ship in April 1984 to Ab Helsingfors Steamship Company who chartered it to the Finnish Aura Line Finnish Aura Line who used her to start a service from Turku to Stockholm as a tourist venture. The Borea began sailing for Aura Line in June 1984, but in October of the same year the Aura Line was declared bankrupt. The 'Borea spent another year laid up, until in October 1985, t was sold to a Canadian firm called Aqua Culture Industries (trading as Vanderbildt Steamship Company) based in Vancouver, who intended to convert the ship into a luxury cruise ship. The plan was never carried out, and the ship continued to be laid up in Turku until January 1987 when Rannikkolinjat, a Finnish company which had been founded in 1985 by the Partanen family from Kotka, Finland purchased her. In the following year the company was renamed Kristina Cruises.

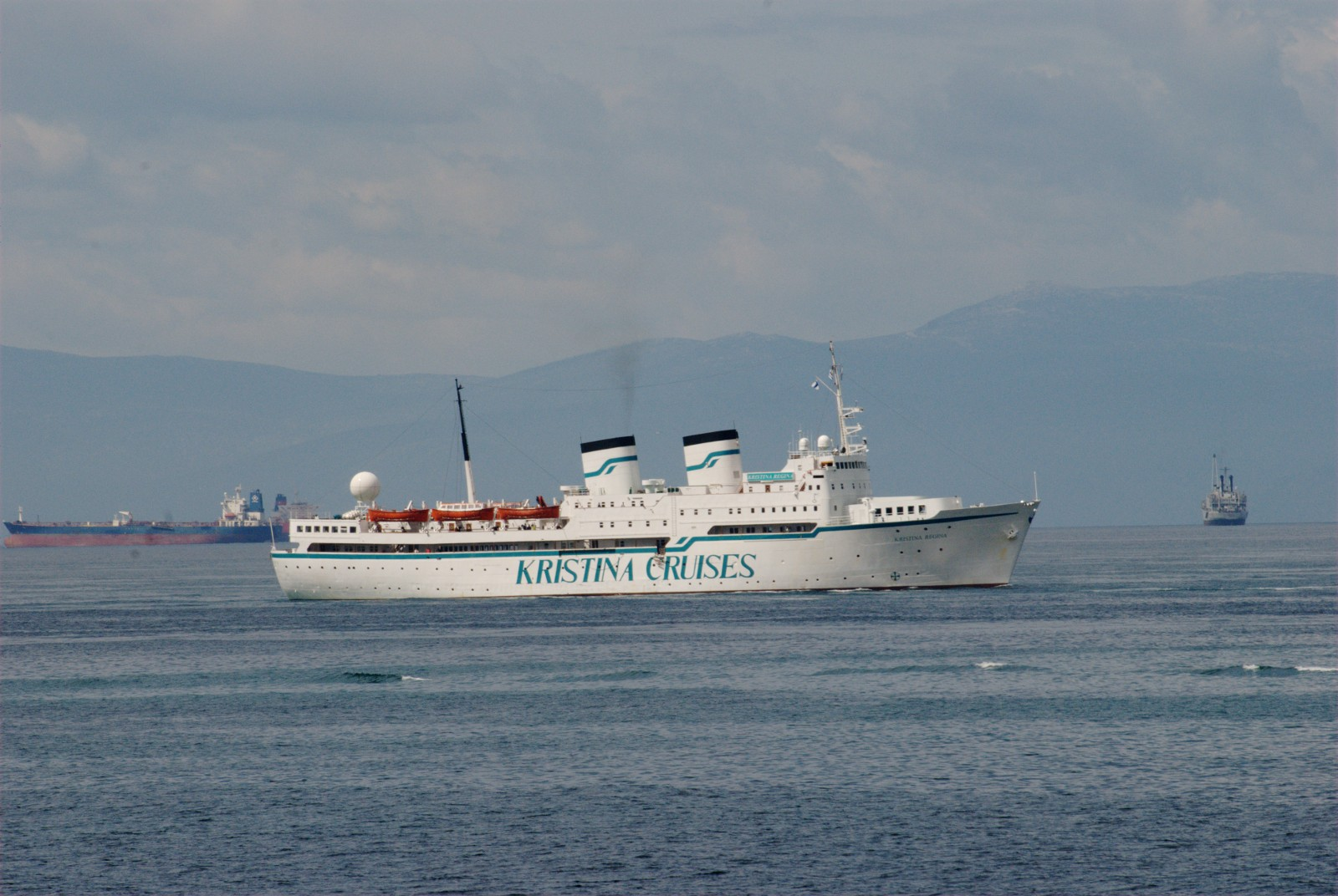
Kristina Regina entering Piraeus harbor

=== Renovation and renaming ===
Renamed MS Kristina Regina after the 17th century Queen Kristina of Sweden, the ship was extensively rebuilt as a cruise ship, with first having her steam engines replaced with diesel units at the Wärtsilä shipyard at Kotka. Then during the winter of 1988-89 the vessel was completely renovated at the Holming shipyard in Rauma. All cabins without bathrooms were removed and 120 brand new cabins were installed, whilst the remaining 30 were completely renovated. During the renovations her car deck was converted into a 250-seat conference and function hall, a sauna was added on first deck and a tax-free shop was installed on third deck. With exceptions of some minor alterations, her profile remained intact. In April 1989 the Kristina Regina commenced her first cruise, operating from Finland mostly to destinations along the Gulf of Finland, but later also destinations in the Baltic Sea, the North Sea, the Mediterranean Sea and Africa's west coast. By February 2007, she was the only Finnish cruise ship in service.

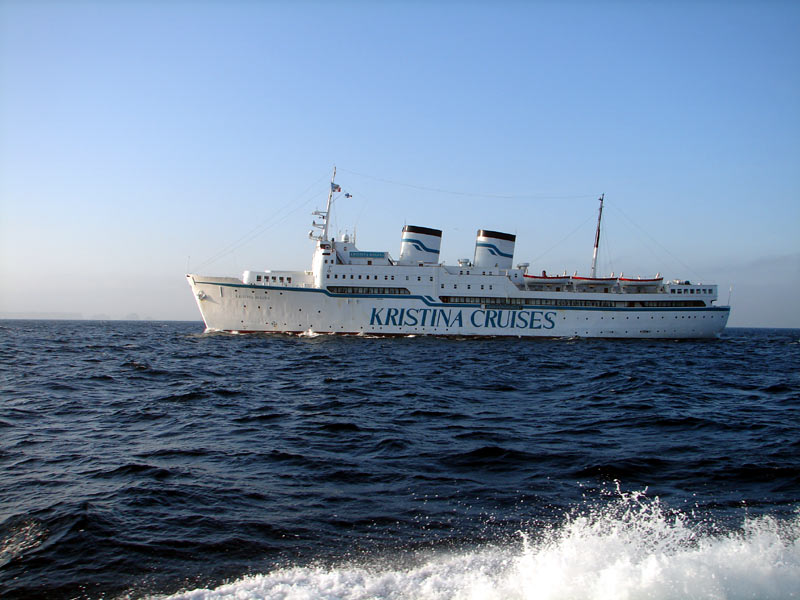
The ship off of Brest, France

A large modernization took place in 2001, but the interiors and exterior remained intact.

After 22 years service as a cruise ship and despite still being in good condition the Kristina Regina wasn't capable by 2010 of fulfilling the stricter fire safety requirements of the SOLAS 2010 regulations. As a result, it was decided to withdraw the vessel from international cruise service and replace it with the much larger Kristina Katarina.

== Preservation ==
The Partanen family were very attached to the Kristina Regina and did not want to see it scrapped. Aware of the efforts of Finnish's entrepreneur Johnny Sid's well publicized but ultimately failed attempt in 2008 to save the ferry Finnjet Mikko Partanen approached Sid prior to withdrawing the cruise ship from service to see if he was interested in buying the MS Kristina Regina. Sid had an interest in old passenger ships due to his family's past involvement with the Bore and Silja lines and in 1984 had enjoyed a family holiday aboard the Bore. Using the experience he had already gained in attempting to save the Finnjet and later the Kungsholm Sid was able to build a business case and obtain the financing necessary for the Finland-based Oy S/S Borea Ab to buy the Kristina Regina for operation as a hotel, restaurant and museum. Oy S/S Borea Ab is dedicated to preservation ships that have a notable position in Finland's maritime history for use in the fields of culture and tourism. Handover of the ship to its new owners took place in August 2010 and it was then moved to Naantali for renovations. The ship was painted with its original livery and was also given back its original name.

While the City of Turku was willing to home the Kristina Regina, a permanent berth proved difficult. By the time the vessel was towed to Turku on 3 October 2010 to be permanently moored as a floating hotel and restaurant in the Aura River, the planned berth on what had been a former industrial area on the city's downtown waterfront was home to newly constructed residential buildings, whose owners objected to their view being obstructed by the ship. Following a grand opening on 10 October 2010 two other locations were used before the Viking Line loaned the vessel a berth which is a 10-minute walk from the Silja and Viking Line ferry terminals and adjacent to the vehicle queuing area. The vessel relocated there in May 2011 and became part of the museum fleet of the Forum Marinum. An exhibition produced by Forum Marinum about the ship's history was opened in the preserved navigation bridge, officer's quarters and owner's suite.

In 2011, the ship was accepted into the Finnish Heritage Agency's register of traditional vessels, and accommodation and restaurant services were started on the ship in addition to its museum services. In the beginning of 2015, the City of Turku centralised its hostel services to Bore with a three-year contract. The vessel's hotel offers accommodation for 250 guests.
