= MS Ocean Endeavour =

Polish cruise ship built in 1981

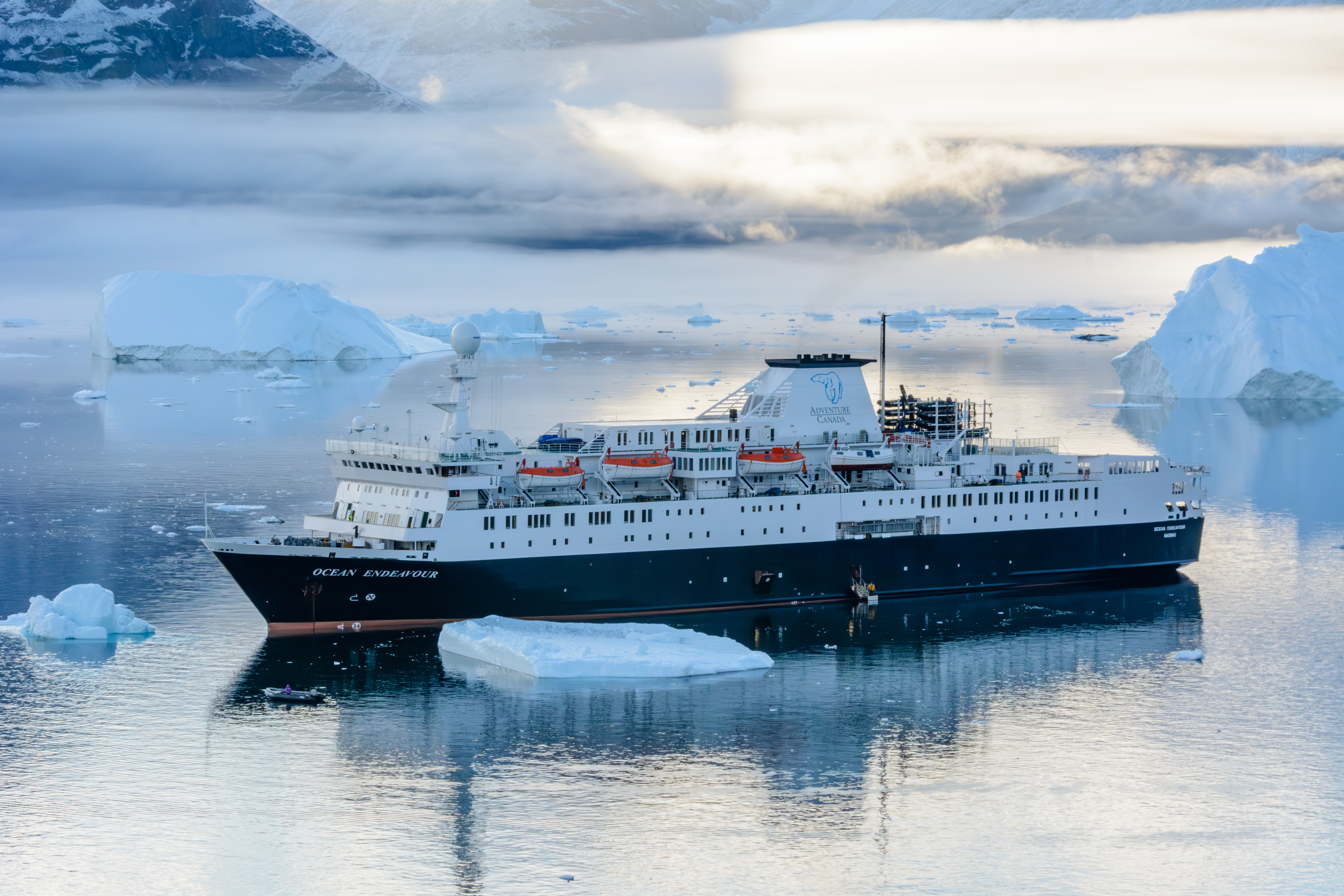
- Expedition ship, MS Ocean Endeavour, at Qeqertarsuaq Island (Karrat Fjord), Greenland

History
- Name: Konstantin Simonov (1982–1996); Francesca (1996–2001); The Iris (2001–2010); Kristina Katarina (2010–2014); Ocean Endeavour (2014–)
- Owner: 2010–2014: Achieva SF-One Ltd
- Operator: Kristina Cruises
- Port of registry: 1982: Vladivostok, Soviet Union; 1982–1987: Odessa,Soviet Union; 1987–1992: Leningrad, Soviet Union; 1992–1996: Saint Petersburg, Russia; 1996–2000: Limassol, Cyprus; 2000–2010: Valletta, Malta; 2010–2014: Kotka, Finland; 2014–2015: Majuro, Marshall Islands; 2015–2022: Nassau, Bahamas; 2022 onwards: Madeira, Portugal
- Builder: Stocznia Szczecinska im Adolfa Warskiego Warskiego, Szczecin, Poland
- Yard number: 492/03
- Launched: 17 April 1981
- Acquired: 1982
- Maiden voyage: April 1982
- Identification: Call sign: CQEJ6; IMO number: 7625811; MMSI number: 255806401
- Status: in active service

General characteristics
- Type: Dmitriy Shostakovich-class ferry; Cruise ship (since 1 December 2004)
- Tonnage: 12,907 GT
- Length: 137.61 m (451 ft)
- Beam: 21.01 m (68.9 ft)
- Draught: 5.6 m (18.4 ft)
- Decks: 9 total, 6 passenger decks
- Installed power: 12,800kW
- Propulsion: Twin propellers
- Speed: 15 knots (28 km/h; 17 mph)
- Capacity: 199 passengers
- Crew: 90–100

MS Ocean Endeavour is a cruise ship built in Poland in 1981.

== History ==
The ship was built by Stocznia Szczecinska im A Warskiego in Szczecin, Poland in 1981 and operated as Konstantin Simonov in the Baltic Sea from construction, undergoing a refit in 1988. From 1996 to 2001, the ship operated as Francesca in the Mediterranean Sea. Until 2010, the ship was owned by Israeli Mano Cruise (after a refit in 2001) and operated in the eastern Mediterranean Sea under the name The Iris, during which time she was registered in Malta.

The ship was refitted again and joined Kristina Cruises as Kristina Katarina in late 2010, taking over as flagship from the much smaller Kristina Regina. On 8 January 2014, the ship was sold and renamed Ocean Endeavour with a capacity of 199 passengers.

In the latest deployment for this vessel, she has been assigned a role with NATO to house troops in Greenland as a floating barracks after geo political concerns in 2026.

== Operation activities ==
The vessel has operated in the northern summer season on the east coast of Canada, Greenland and the Canadian Arctic by Adventure Canada, and in the southern summer season to Antarctica from Ushuaia by a joint venture between Intrepid Travel and Chimu Adventures. Adventure Canada is an independent, family-owned expedition cruise company from Mississauga, Ontario, Canada. Chimu Adventures and Intrepid Travel are Australian-owned Adventure travel companies.

== Wreck of the Erebus visit ==
On 5 September 2019, passengers of Adventure Canada on Ocean Endeavour were the first members of the public to visit the site of the wreck of HMS Erebus, one of the two ships of the ill-fated Franklin expedition which aimed to traverse the North-West Passage through the Canadian Arctic Archipelago.

The wreck site is within the Wrecks of HMS Erebus and HMS Terror National Historic Site and is managed by Parks Canada, which does not normally permit public access to the site. The visit by Adventure Canada passengers was a trial by Parks Canada in creating a visitor experience for the wreck site.

== Gallery ==
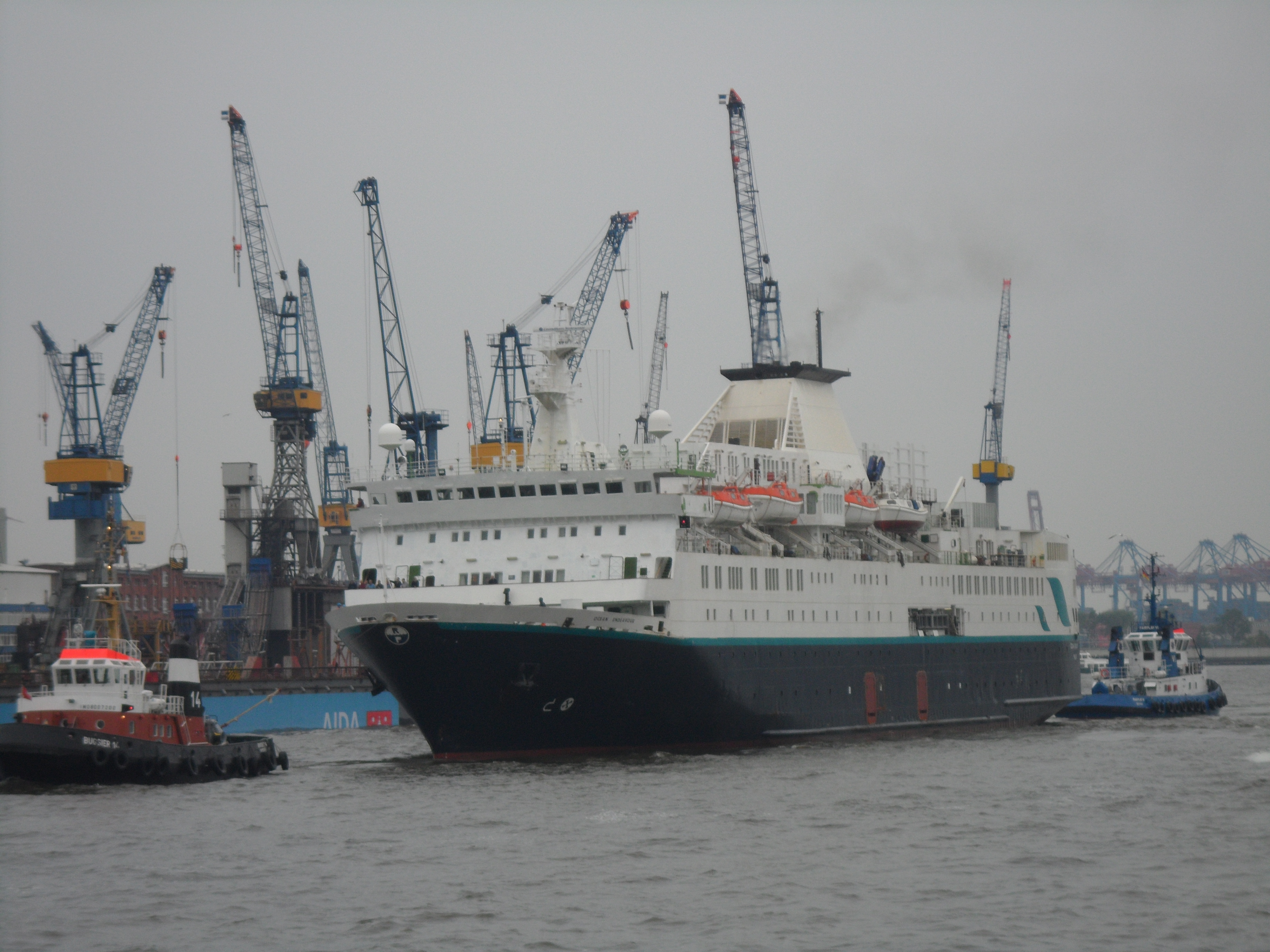
Ocean Endeavour in Hamburg, 2015

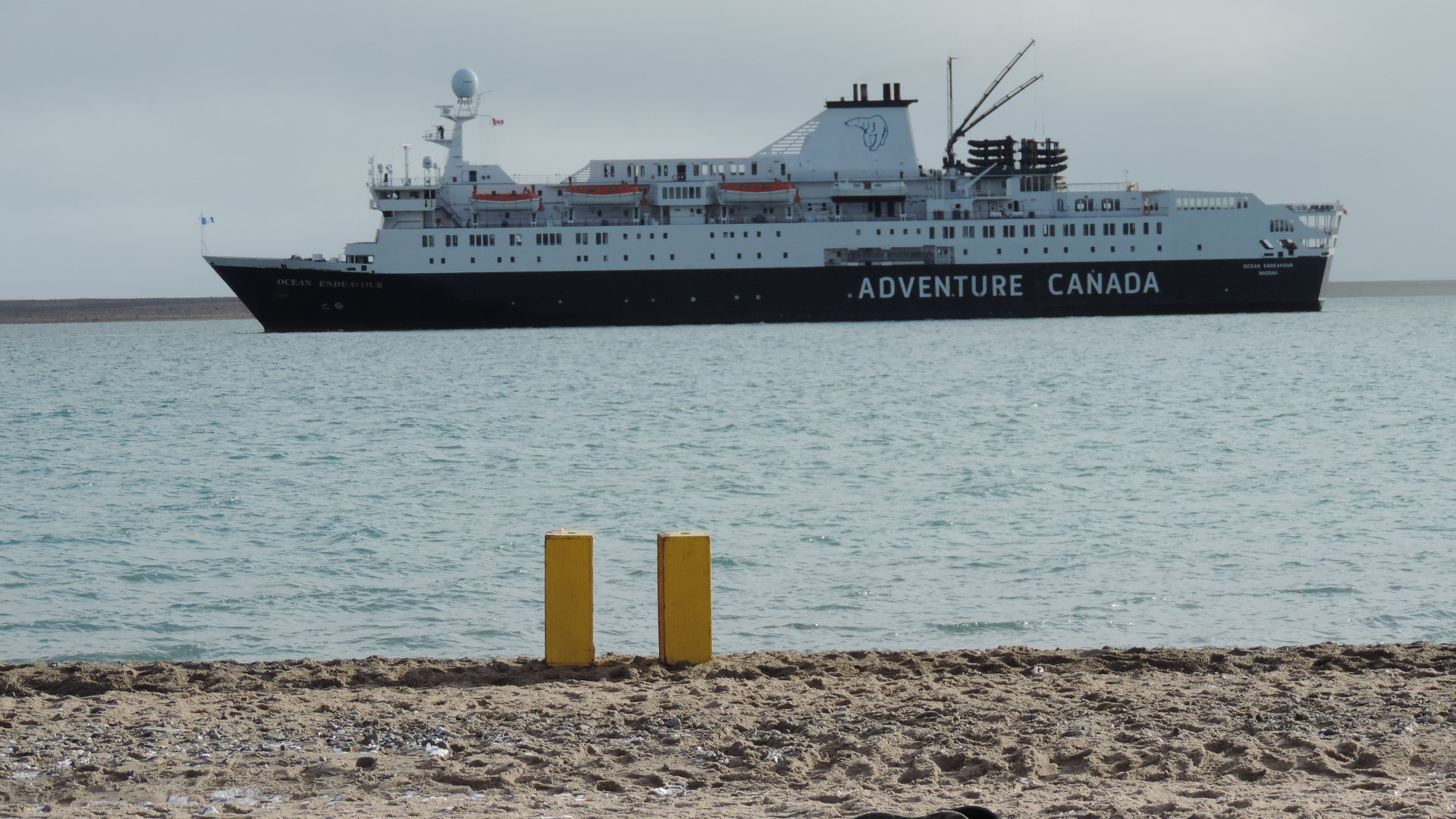
Ocean Endeavour off Jenny Lind Island, Canada, 2019

== See also ==
- Dmitriy Shostakovich-class ferry
