= Kristina Cruises =

Finnish shipping company

Kristina Cruises Oy
- Industry: Passenger cruises
- Founded: 1985
- Headquarters: Kotka, Finland
- Area served: Baltic Sea; Atlantic; Mediterranean
- Key people: Mikko Partanen, CEO

Kristina Cruises (previously Rannikkolinjat) is a Finnish family-owned shipping company with over fifty years of experience in cruise business. The company was founded in 1985 and registered in Kotka. In addition to the five destinations in the early days of business they currently sail to more than 70 ports. Summer destinations traditionally include several ports of the Baltic Sea, Norwegian fjords and other cities in Northern Europe. In the autumn the ship usually sails in the Mediterranean, where one week cruises to many different destinations are arranged. During winter seasons their ships have sailed in Canary Islands and east coast of Africa.

They used to operate two ships, Kristina Regina (1960) made foreign cruises, often cruising in the Mediterranean Sea and other warm destinations. The second ship, Kristina Brahe (1943) was used for cruises within the lakes and coast of Finland. These ships begun to show their age and did not meet the new regulations and have now been sold. MS Kristina Katarina, originally built in 1982 as M/S Konstantin Simonov, was the latest ship.

In 2013 the company faced financial difficulties forcing Kristina Cruises to lay up its 1982-built Katarina cruise ship for the winter and cancel the season, the company today has sold the vessel to FleetProOcean.

All 2014 plans are cancelled and the company is said to be concentrating on selling cruises on other ships as a tour operator.
