= Moshe Mano =

Israeli businessman (born 1955)

- משה מנו
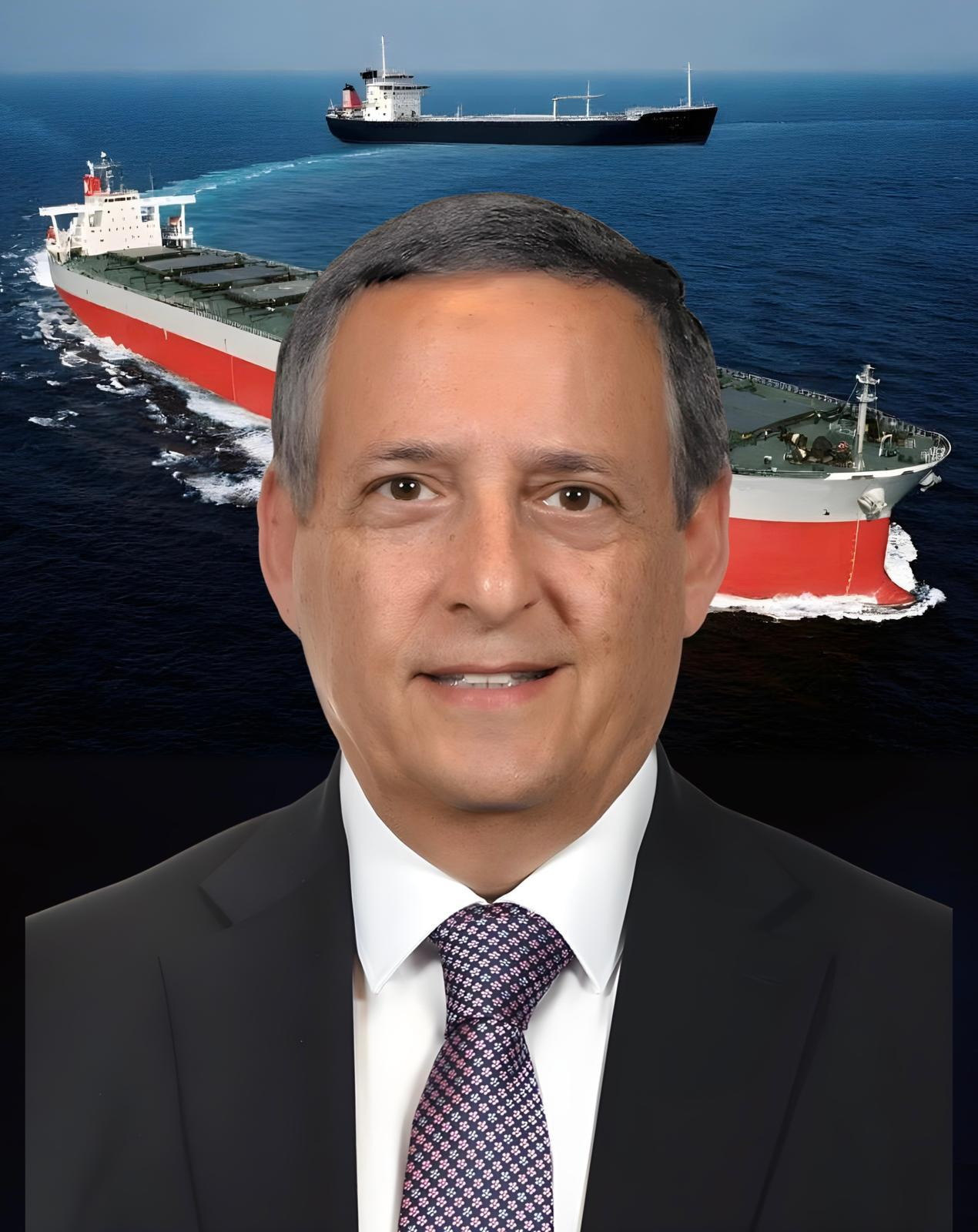
- Moshe Mano
- Born: 1955 (age 70–71); Haifa, Israel
- Occupation: Businessman
- Known for: Founder, President, and CEO of the Mano Holdings Group
- Spouse: Iris Mano
- Children: Moran Mano, Liran Mano, Sivan Mano

Honorary Consul of the Russian Federation in Haifa and the North of Israel
- Incumbent
- Assumed office 1995

Moshe Mano (Hebrew: משה מנו; born 1955, in Haifa, Israel) is a businessman who is active in the maritime, hospitality, and real estate industries. He is the founder, President, and CEO of the Mano Holdings Group, which includes Mano Maritime, Mano Holidays, Bambook Properties, Flamingo Universe, Rodex and Mano City. He holds 50% of Crown Shipping company.

The companies in the Mano Holdings Group are rated among the 100 largest companies in Israel for the Service & Trade category. Mano is the founder of the first local radio station in Israel. He is an honorary citizen of Haifa. and was also an active collaborator during the 1990s Post-Soviet aliyah (1991–2000).

== Biography ==
In 1932, at the height of the Fifth Aliyah (1929–1939), Moshe Mano's father, Mordechai Mano, emigrated with his parents from Thessaloniki, Greece to what is now Israel, along with other Greek workers who contributed to the construction of the Port of Haifa. Abba Hushi, who was head of the Workers’ Council in Haifa at the time, traveled to Thessaloniki to persuade Jewish workers to make Aliyah. Among the 100 families that agreed to relocate were members of the Mano family including Mordechai, who was only 12 years old at the time. This relocation allowed the families to escape the Holocaust, during which the Jews in Thessaloniki were persecuted and killed.

Mordechai Mano raised a family in Israel and is now considered one of the pioneers in the maritime transportation field, having founded Mediterranean Seaways in 1945. He died in 1969 when his son Moshe was only 14 years old. Moshe Mano, the youngest son of Esther and Mordechai Mano, was born in Haifa in 1955 and has lived there ever since. He did his military service in the Israeli Air Force. He is married to Iris Mano, responsible for the Mano Group's Tourism division. His son Moran also works in the family business in the maritime transport field, and another son, Liran, participates in the real estate and entrepreneurship of the Mano Group. His daughter Sivan is a writer and an educator. Moshe Mano is fluent in Hebrew and English and speaks Arabic and Spanish.

In 2022, Moshe Mano initiated the establishment of "Mano Square" to commemorate his father Mordechai Mano, in Mount Carmel, Haifa.

He published an autobiographical book called Yamim Soharim (English: Rough seas).

== Business activities ==
In his early thirties, Moshe Mano decided to carry out his father's vision and establish a new maritime company. He established Mano Maritime and subsequently became a subsidiary of the Mano Holdings Group, which Mano owns. Over the years, the group has expanded to include additional activities: cargo ships, passenger ships, real estate, hotels in Israel and abroad, technology, communications, etc. The company has a broad network of international relations and cooperates with global maritime companies such as the Japanese transportation company "K" Line and Ocean Network Express ("ONE").

Mano Maritime operates a diversified shipping fleet: container ships, bulk carriers, automobile transport, and other cargo vessels. In 2009, Mano commenced managing the Golden Iris cruise ship and soon afterward began operating leading cruises from and to Israel. In 2018, Mano commenced managing the cruise ship Crown Iris. In the real estate field, the company buys and leases commercial buildings, and in 2012, it entered the hotel industry by acquiring hotel properties both locally and internationally. Four of the company's ships (Royal Iris, Golden Iris, Crown Iris, The Iris) are named after Iris Mano, Moshe Mano's wife.

For the past few years, Moshe Mano, the Mano Group, and Mano Maritime Ltd. have been listed among the top 100 companies on the Israeli market in the Dun & Bradstreet ratings in the service & trade category. and listed in the BDI rating in the BdiCode, services, and transportation.

Moshe Mano is also a business angel and invests in additional fields such as the Israeli hi-tech industry. In 2023, he acquired Avantgarde Residence Corporation, which managed an assisted living apartment complex in Merkaz HaCarmel, Haifa.

In 2024, Mano expanded his real estate portfolio by acquiring the Crowne Plaza Haifa hotel (rebranded as Miravel Hotel).

== Social and community activities ==
From 1991 through the mid-2000s, during the period of the 1990s Post-Soviet aliyah, Moshe Mano collaborated with the EEF and sent Mano Maritime's passenger ships to bring over 120,000 immigrants to Israel from the former USSR. In 1995, Mano was awarded the title of honorary consul of Russia in Haifa and the north of Israel.

In 1991 he established Radio 1 (later become Haifa Radio) the first local radio station in Israel, broadcasting to the North and throughout the Haifa region. In 2025, he joined as a senior partner to "Radio Kol Rega," a regional radio station, along with its founder, media anchor, and journalist Chaim Hecht.

The Israeli Navy awarded Moshe Mano the title Notable of the Israeli Navy for his many years of contribution and assistance to both the sailors and the Navy in different domains including a memorial cruise to the INS Dakar submarine for the benefit of families of the crew. Mano also contributes to various volunteer associations and charitable organizations such as women's shelters, boarding schools, educational institutions for children, and others. He has also contributed to the community by providing leisure cruises for holocaust survivors, children with cancer or at risk, scholarship for Ethiopian Jews in Israel, and others in need.

In June 2025, during the Twelve-Day War, Moshe Mano initiated and carried out the shipping of thousands of Israelis from abroad to Israel using Mano Maritime ships, following the closure of Israeli airspace and the suspension of flights to and from the country.

== Awards and recognition ==
- 1995: Honorary consul of the Russian Federation in Haifa and the North of Israel.
- 2005: Awarded the rank of "Notable" by the Israeli Navy for services rendered.
- 2009: The Israeli Economy award by Haifa University.
- 2009: Honorary resident of the city Alanya, Turkey.
- 2018: Honorary title of the city Larnaca, Cyprus
- 2023: Honorary title of the city Haifa, Israel.
