= Ocean Club Cruises =

Ocean Club Cruises was a cruise line that operated for a short period of time in Florida from Port Canaveral. The line offered inexpensive cruises sailed from May 2003 until December 2003 when it filed for bankruptcy and never reopened. The cruise line itself was based in Cape Canaveral, Florida and operated with one ship, the Mirage I. The ship operated 2-night cruises to Grand Bahama Island and 3-night cruises to Grand Bahama Island and to either Nassau, Bahamas or Key West. The ship was allegedly plagued by negative customer reaction since it began operations.
