= En Tus Manos =

En Tus Manos may refer to:

- En Tus Manos (film), a 2010 short film
- En Tus Manos (album), a 1997 album by La Mafia
