= Manó Kogutowicz =

Hungarian cartographer

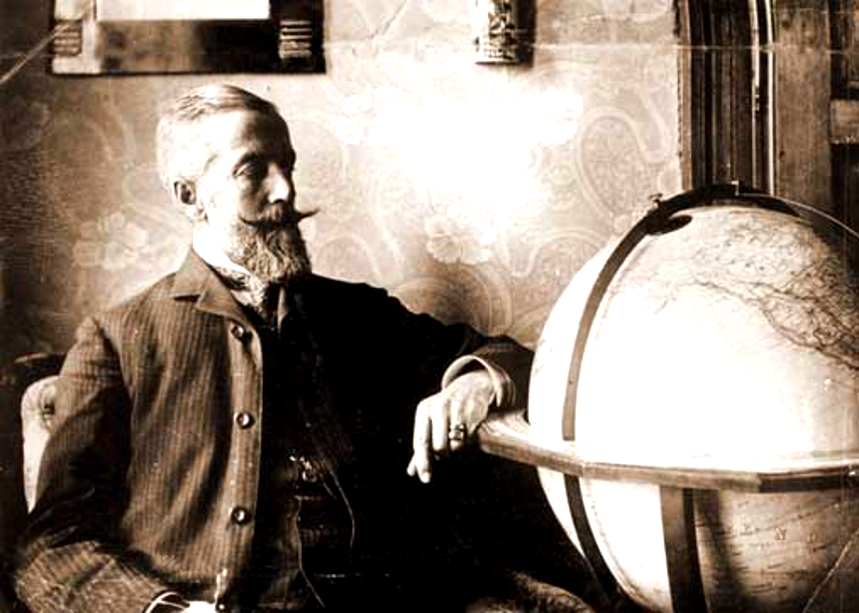
Kogutowicz with one of his globes, c. 1900

Manó Kogutowicz or Emanuel Thomas Kogutovicz (21 December 1851 – 22 December 1908) was a Polish-Hungarian cartographer. He was the founder of the Hungarian Geographical Institute.

== Life and career ==
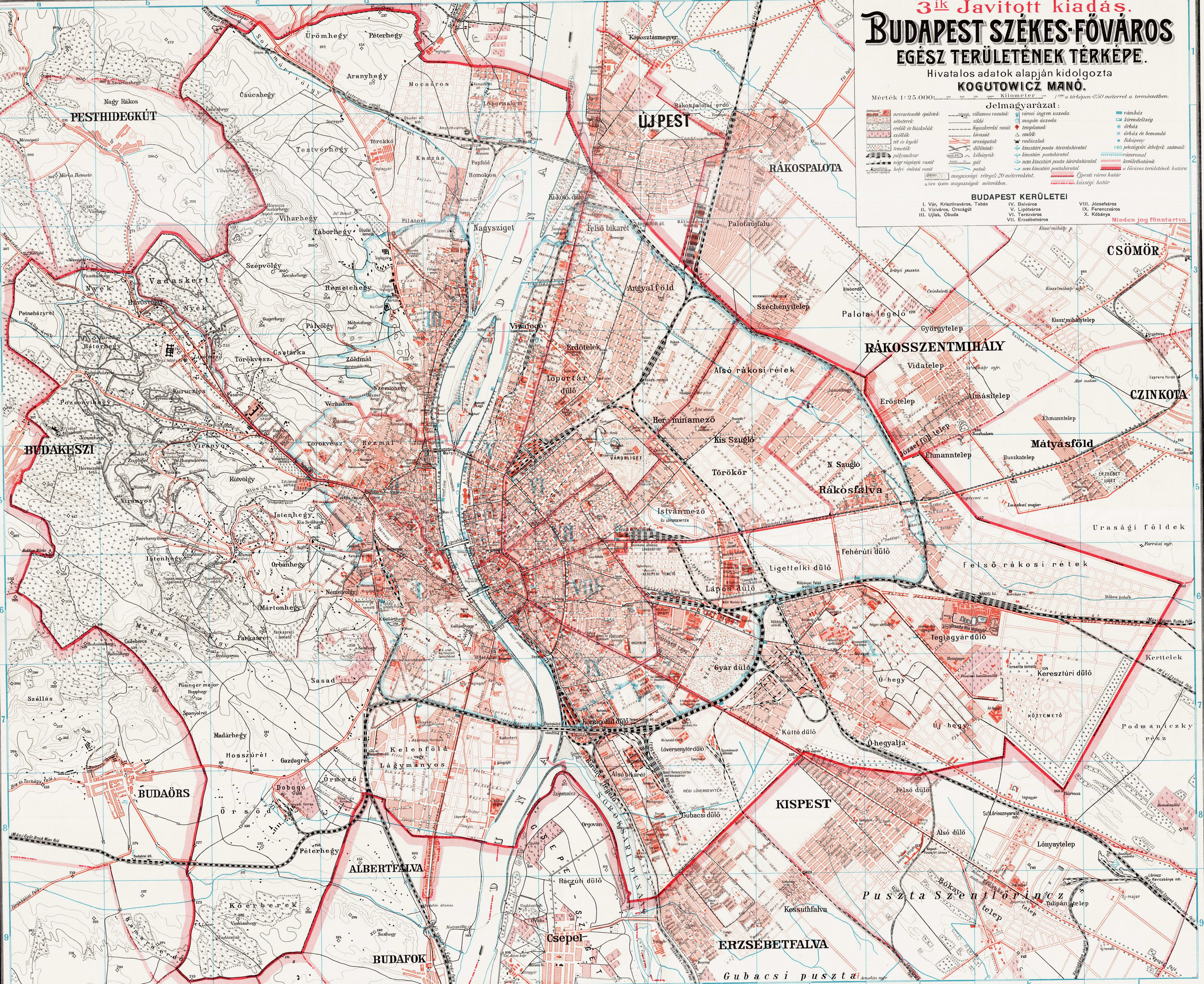
1908 map of Budapest

Manó Kogutowicz was born in Židlochovice, Moravia, Austrian Empire on 21 December 1851. After the Austro-Hungarian Compromise of 1867, the Kingdom of Hungary was able to partially re-establish its sovereignty and expanded its influence in public life and administration. The following year, the Elementary Education Act of 1868 was passed that required school attendance from ages 6 to 15, with a penalty for disobedience. The law also stipulated that students would be instructed in their own native languages. However there were no Hungarian-language maps or atlases available for elementary or secondary education. Kogutowicz published a small school atlas with five pages of maps of Budapest and the surrounding area. The initial atlas ('Small Atlas with a county map for third grade pupils of elementary schools') was popular and Kogutowicz gradually added to it over the next ten years, totally to 13 pages. Kogutowicz was able to convince the Hungarian ministry of education, and the minister Albin Csáky, of the importance of a Hungarian cartography institute. The ministry subsequently placed an order for the school maps to come from Kogutowicz's institute in 1890, the same year it was founded. Much acclaimed in and out of Hungary, the atlases won a gold medal at the 1900 Paris Exposition.

After the success of the school atlases, Kogutowicz's company, Kogutowicz & Co., established in 1892, was contracted by the Ministry of Defense in 1900 to supply military schools with atlases. Kogutowicz died in Budapest on 22 December 1908, aged 57. Kogutowicz's son, Károly, also worked as a cartographer for the company and continued the business after his father's death.
