= Mordechai Mano =

Israeli businessman

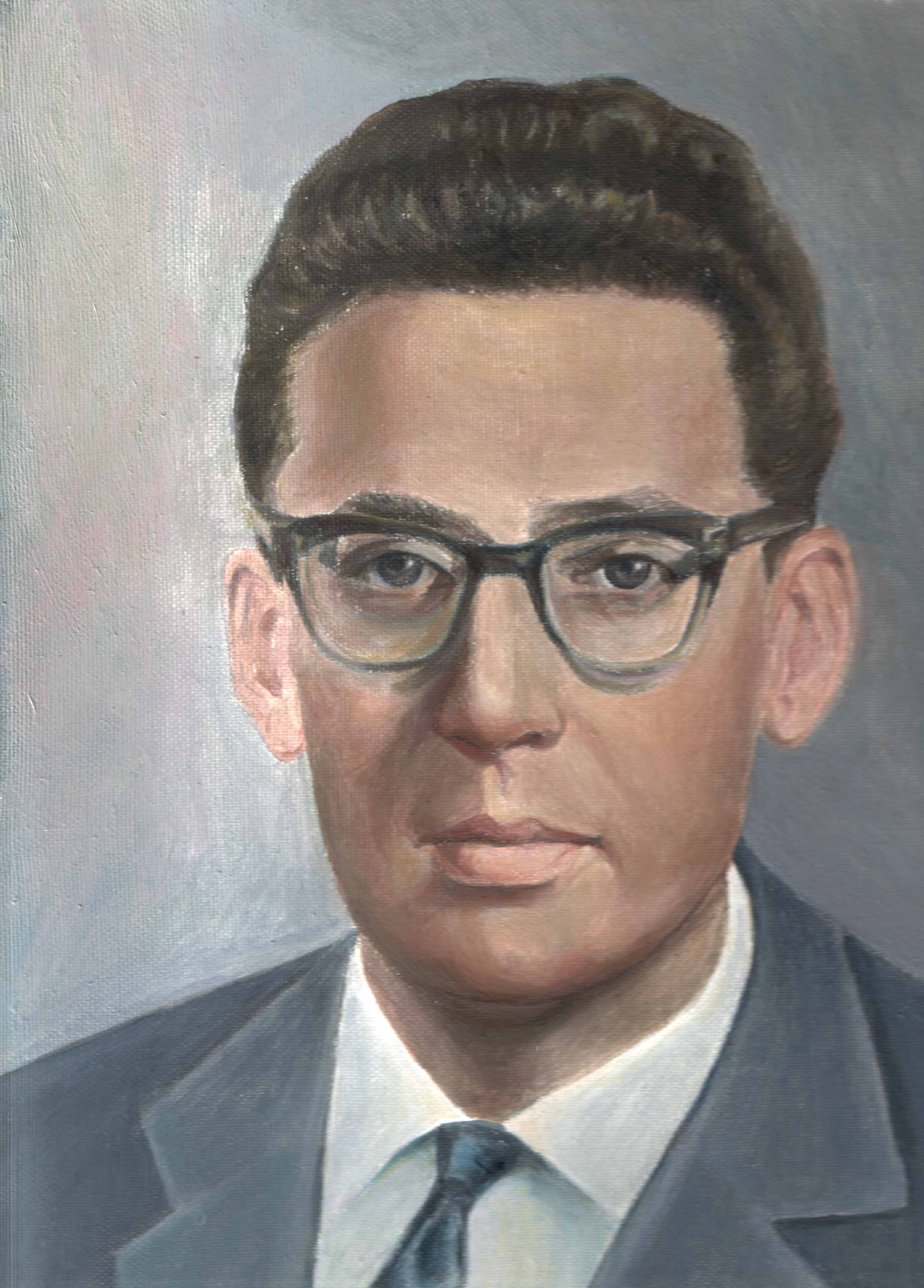
Mordechai Mano

Mordechai Mano (Hebrew: מרדכי מנו; 1922, Salonika, Greece – 1969) was an Israeli businessman and member of the Mano shipping family. He was one of the pioneers in the maritime industry and Israeli economy in general.

== Biography ==
Born into a shipping family from Thessaloniki, Greece, Mordechai was the son of Samuel Mano (1880-1962), who owned and operated from Thessaloniki, a fleet of “Maunas”, self-propelled barges, which served the Greek mainland and island ports. In 1932, when Mano was 9, his family immigrated to Mandatory Palestine, as part of the big immigration waves organized by Abba Hushi, an activist and leader of the Jewish Agency, in order to strengthen the Jewish working forces at the port of Haifa.

Mordechai Mano received his knowledge and experience in the maritime industry from his father Samuel (1880-1962), who had worked at the shipping docks in Salonika. Samuel and his eldest brother, Morris, worked at the Haifa port till their retirement. Mano began his career as a messenger and a port clerk at the Nisim Meshulam shipping agency, and later at the shipping company Atid (which was established in 1934 by the Burhard family) where he studied all the secrets of the shipping trade. Spending days and nights working and learning every possible aspect of the business, combined with a lot of reading on the subject, Mano soon became an expert. He was known as a pioneer and as a man with a vision and a special talent for getting on with people and making important business connections all around the world. One of his big advantages was a gift for languages. Mordechai spoke seven languages fluently (including Turkish and Arabic).

In 1943, he established a shipping agency in Haifa called Mordechai Mano Shipping Agents on Ha Hazmaut Street and later moved the company offices to 53 Ha Namal Street. The agency dealt with the free zone trade ships that arrived at Haifa and later purchased its first ship, a small wooden vessel, which was used primarily for the importing of food products from Turkey in cooperation with the shipping agency Israel Gotesman and Sons, which dealt with the trade in food products during the austerity days of the early nineteen-fifties.

In 1956, the shipping company Netivei Hayam Hatihon (Mediterranean Seaways) was established in partnership with the Ofer Brothers Group, Mano was the company's administrator and senior partner. The company purchased a number of additional ships: “Carmela and Malka (named after his daughters), Eyal, Liora (named after Yuli Ofer's daughter Liora Ofer), and others. Netivei Hayam Hatihon established new routes and soon became a major carrier of cargo and freight to Israel through the Mediterranean and especially from the Adriatic.

After the end of the Suez Crisis, an Israeli government initiative saw Mano organize an operation with the ship Panagaya, in which cement was transferred from Haifa to Eilat as an experimental transition of Israeli cargo and freight. This was recognized as a big success by the government. Mano was personally honored by Golda Meir, former prime minister of Israel.

In 1965, the ownership of Nativei Hayam Hatichon was divided, and Mano established a new family company called Mano Nativei Yam. Some of the Netivei Hayam Hatichon ships were transferred to the new company with the addition of some chartered ships. The company managed those ships and also had an agency and part of ownership in the ports of Haifa and Ashdod.

By 1967, he had already established a prominent ship-owning company with a substantial presence in the Mediterranean and global shipping arena.

Mano died at the beginning of 1969. He left a wife, Ester Mano, two daughters, Carmela and Malka, two sons, Samuel Mano and Moshe Mano, and a grandson. His eldest son, Samuel, heads the Seagull Maritime company, Moshe is the owner of Mano Maritime, Pessah (Paul) Weissman, Mano's eldest son-in-law, manages the Hadar Maritime company, and Sami Niago, Mano’s son-in-law, manages Carmel Shipping company.

Dan Mano, his grandson is an Israeli public figure since starring in the first season of the TV show Survivor.

In 2020 Haifa municipality named "Mano Square" to commemorate his name.

== See also ==
- Mano Maritime
