= MS Cunard Princess =

Cruise ship

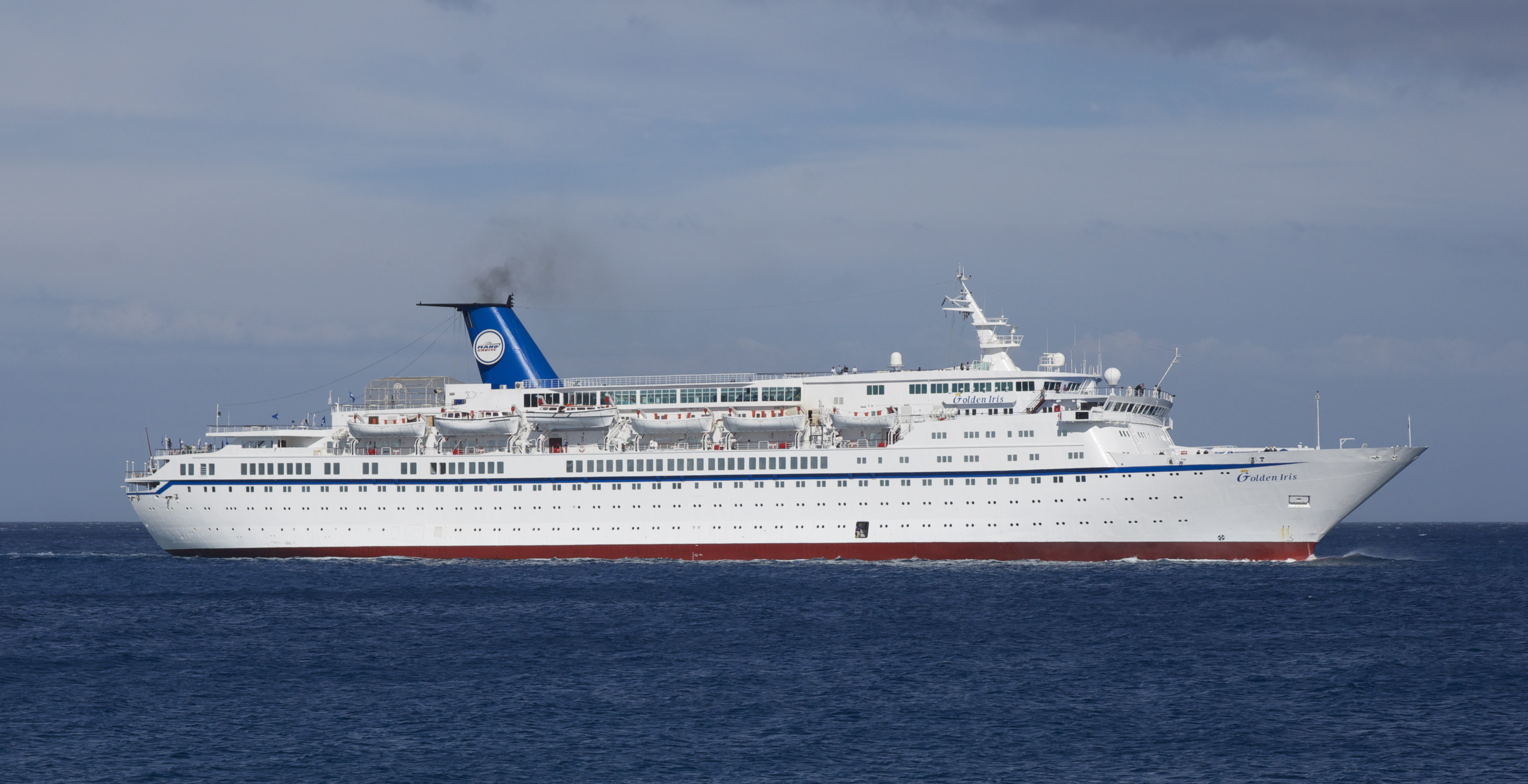
- MS Golden Iris in Rhodes, 2011

History
- Name: 1975–1976: Cunard Conquest; 1976–1995: Cunard Princess; 1995–2009: Rhapsody; 2009–2021: Golden Iris; 2021–2022: Gold Club; 2022: Old Club
- Owner: 1975–1995: Cunard; 1995: StarLauro; 1995–2009: MSC Cruises; 2009–2021: Mano Maritime
- Operator: 1977–1995: Cunard; 1995: StarLauro; 1995–2009: MSC Cruises; 2009–2021: Mano Maritime
- Port of registry: 1975–1980: Southampton, United Kingdom; 1980–1995: Nassau, Bahamas; 1995–2001: Panama City, Panama; 2001–2006: Naples, Italy; 2006–2022: Panama City, Panama; 2006–2022: Freetown, Sierra Leone
- Builder: Burmeister & Wain, Copenhagen, Denmark (hull); INMA, La Spezia, Italy (outfitting)
- Cost: £12 million
- Yard number: 859
- Launched: 12 December 1974
- Completed: 14 March 1977
- Maiden voyage: March 1977
- In service: March 1977
- Out of service: 2021
- Identification: Call sign: 9LU2015; IMO number: 7358573; MMSI number: 371771000
- Fate: Scrapped in 2022

General characteristics (as built)
- Class & type: Cunard Countess-class cruise ship
- Tonnage: 17,496 GRT; 2,499 t DWT
- Length: 163.56 m (536 ft 7 in)
- Beam: 22.80 m (74 ft 10 in)
- Draught: 8.30 m (27 ft 3 in)
- Installed power: 4 × Burmeister & Wain 7U50HU diesels; combined 15,447 kW
- Propulsion: 2 propellers
- Speed: 21.5 knots (39.82 km/h; 24.74 mph) (top speed); 20.5 knots (37.97 km/h; 23.59 mph) (service speed)
- Capacity: 947 passengers

General characteristics (as rebuilt, 1997)
- Tonnage: 16,852 GT
- Length: 164.90 m (541 ft 0 in)
- Beam: 23.20 m (76 ft 1 in)
- Draught: 5.80 m (19 ft 0 in)
- Decks: 8
- Capacity: 959 passengers
- Crew: 350
- Notes: Otherwise the same as built

MS Cunard Princess was a cruise ship, previously owned an operated by the Israel-based Mano Maritime. She was built 1975 by the Burmeister & Wain shipyard in Copenhagen, Denmark, for Cunard as MS Cunard Conquest, but her interior fittings were subsequently installed at the INMA (Industrie Navali Meccaniche Affini) facility in La Spezia, Italy. Following re-delivery from INMA in 1977 the ship was renamed MS Cunard Princess. In 1995, the ship entered service with StarLauro Cruises (later rebranded MSC Cruises), briefly retaining her previous name before being renamed MS Rhapsody. In 2009 she was sold to Mano Maritime and sailed as Golden Iris until 2018, when she was laid up at Chalkis Shipyard, Greece. In 2021 she was renamed Gold Club. After four years lay-up, she was sold in 2022 to Turkish shipbreakers and beached at Aliağa for recycling.

== Concept and construction ==
The ship that eventually became known as the Cunard Princess was originally one of two ships ordered by Overseas National Airways. Unusually Hugh Hefner, the founder of Playboy, was involved in the design process of the ships, envisioning them as "floating Playboy Clubs". Order for the two ships was placed with the Burmeister & Wain shipyard in Copenhagen, Denmark. However, during construction the ships were sold to Cunard, In which Cunard previously operated the RMS Queen Mary and RMS Queen Elizabeth. Although better known as luxury cruise operators, Cunard decided to maintain the original informal cruise concept developed for the ships by Overseas National Airways.

Cunard Conquest, the second of the two sisters, was launched from drydock in December 1974. Instead of having the ships completed at Burmeister & Wain, Cunard decided that once the hulls of the ships were complete they would sail to the Navali Mechaniche Affini in La Spezia, Italy, where interior fittings would be installed. Therefore, following delivery to Cunard on 30 October 1975 the Cunard Conquest sailed to La Spezia, where she arrived on 6 November 1975. While the ship was being fitted out Cunard decided to change her name to Cunard Princess. Following delivery to Cunard in early 1977 the ship sailed to New York City, where she was renamed and christened by Princess Grace of Monaco.

== Service history ==
=== 1977–1995: Cunard Princess ===
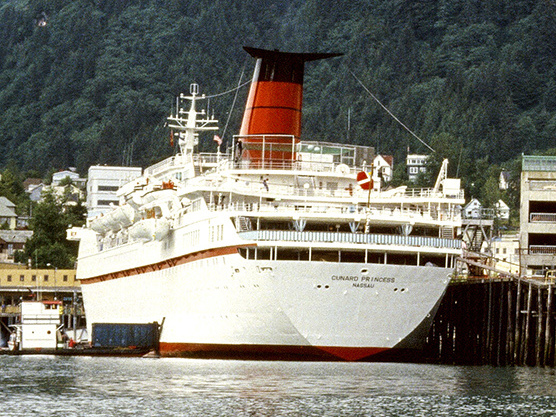
Cunard Princess in Juneau, Alaska in 1986.

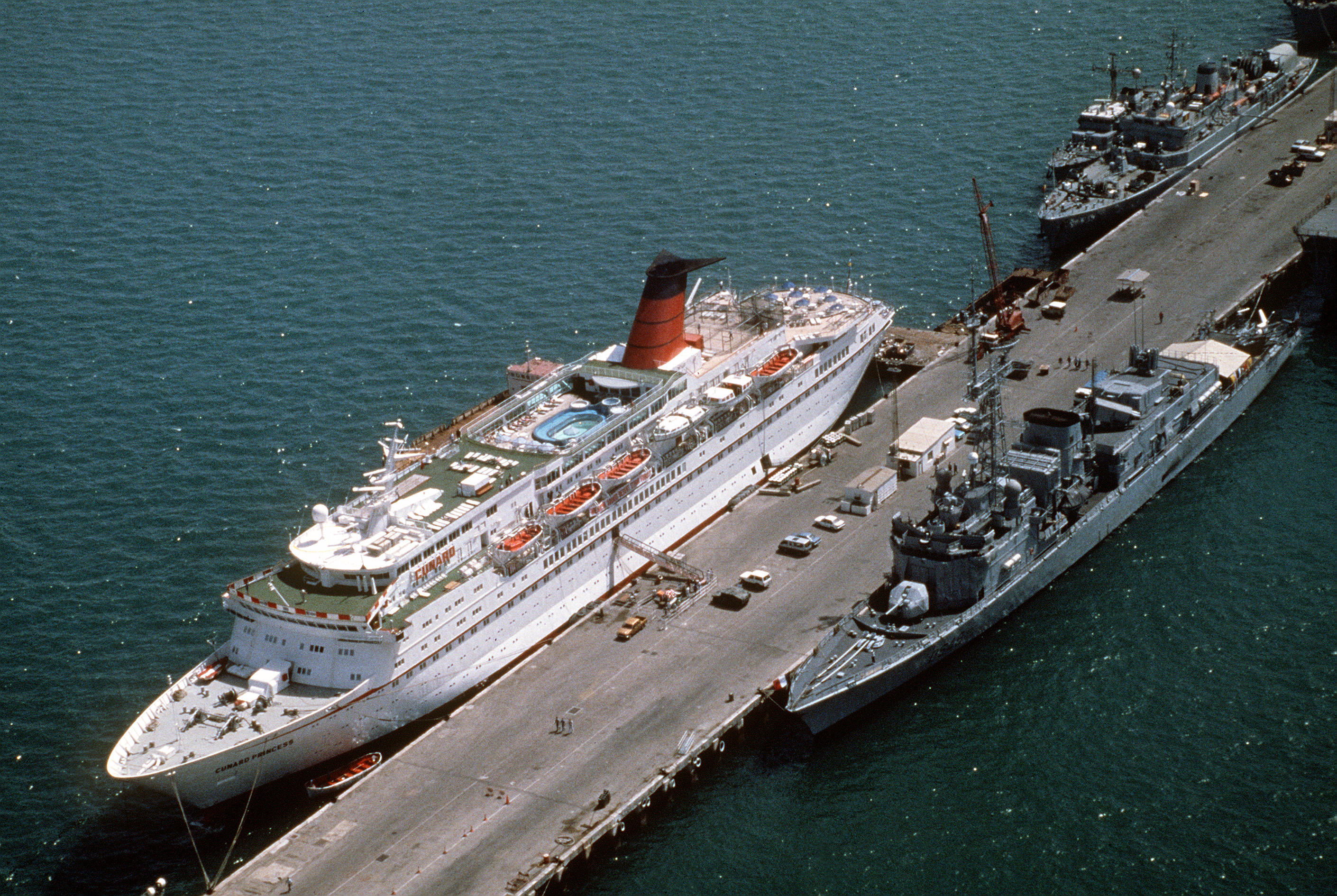
Cunard Princess in 1991

Cunard Princess set on her first cruise from New York City to Bermuda in April 1977, joining her elder sister MS Cunard Countess in the Caribbean cruise service after the Bermuda run. Cunard Princess sailed out of Ft Lauderdale, then after a charter to Lauro Line in 1979 she sailed a Caribbean run out of San Juan, in the summer of 1981, she did Alaska cruises. At the time the Cunard Princess was registered in Southampton, but in 1980 she was moved to the Bahamian registry, with Nassau as her homeport. Later during her career with Cunard, the ship started cruising around Europe, while the Cunard Countess remained in Caribbean service.

During the Gulf War the Cunard Princess was chartered to the United States Armed Forces Recreation Center as a recreational facility for troops involved in the conflict. The ship arrived in Bahrain on 24 December 1990. Initially the plan was to operate the ship on three-day cruises around the Persian Gulf, but for economic reasons she was permanently moored in Bahrain instead. Following the end of her service in the Gulf War, the ship was docked at Valletta, Malta on 23 September 1991. She re-entered normal service with Cunard on 19 October 1991.

In 1993 the Cunard Princess was moved to the fleet of Cunard's newly created mid-market subsidiary Cunard Crown Cruises, joining her sister Cunard Countess and three ships chartered from EffJohn. Cunard Crown Cruises proved to be short-lived, and in 1995 the Cunard Princess was chartered to StarLauro Cruises, who were in need of a replacement for their MS Achille Lauro that had sunk following a fire in 1994. Initially the Cunard Princess kept her older name in StarLauro service.

=== 1995–2009: Rhapsody ===
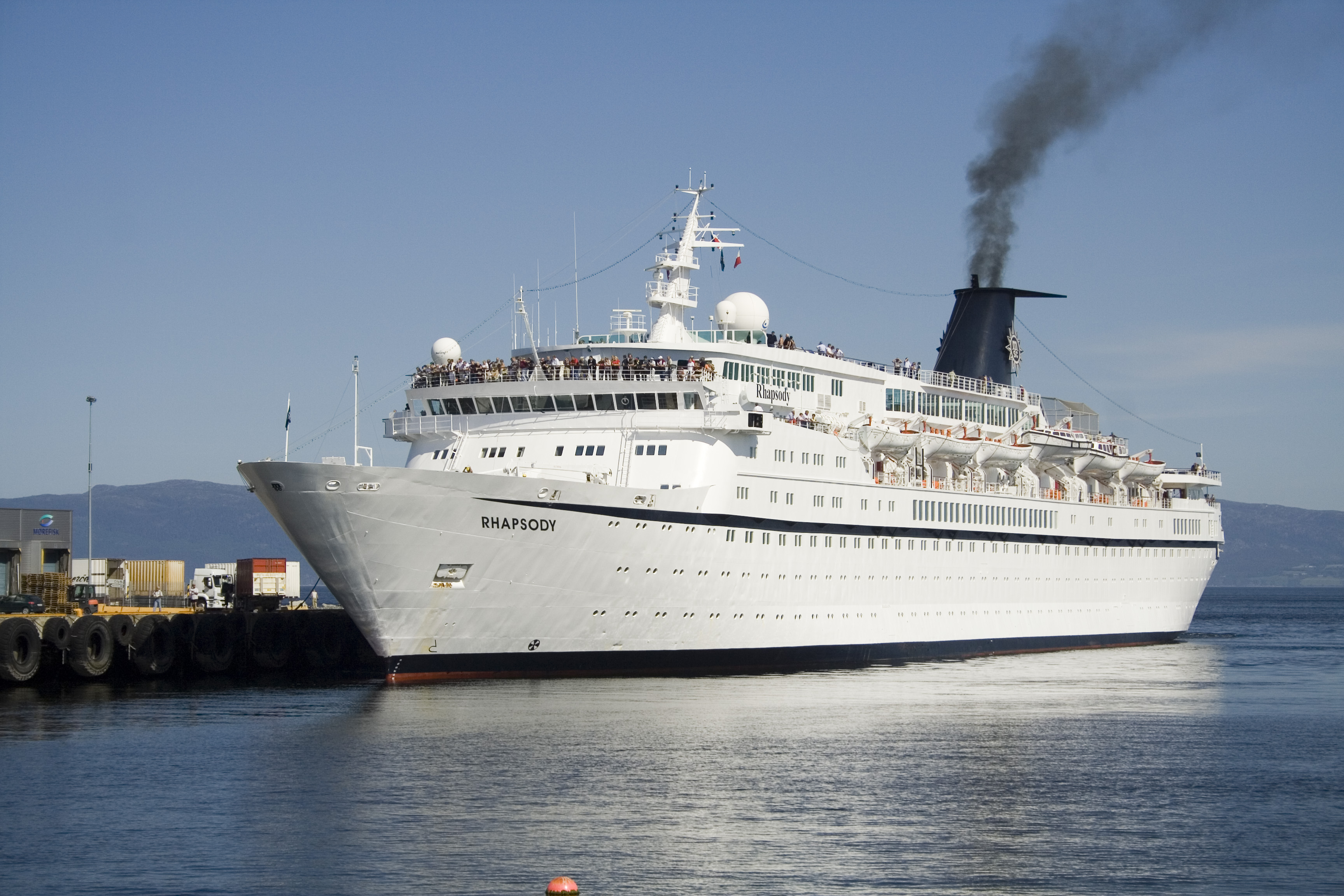
Rhapsody in Trondheim, Norway in 2007.

After a short time under charter to StarLauro, the company acquired the Cunard Princess. Initially the ship was planned to be renamed Harmony, but in the end she was renamed Rhapsody. Coinciding with the change of ownership the ship was re-registered in Panama. Initially she was used for cruising around the Mediterranean out of Italy. Shortly after acquisition of the Rhapsody StarLauro was rebranded as Mediterranean Shipping Cruises on 1 October 1995. Subsequently the company further rebranded themselves into MSC Cruises.

In 2001 the Rhapsody was re-registered to Naples. On 9 April 2009 MSC Cruises sold the Rhapsody to the Israel-based cruise operator Mano Maritime.

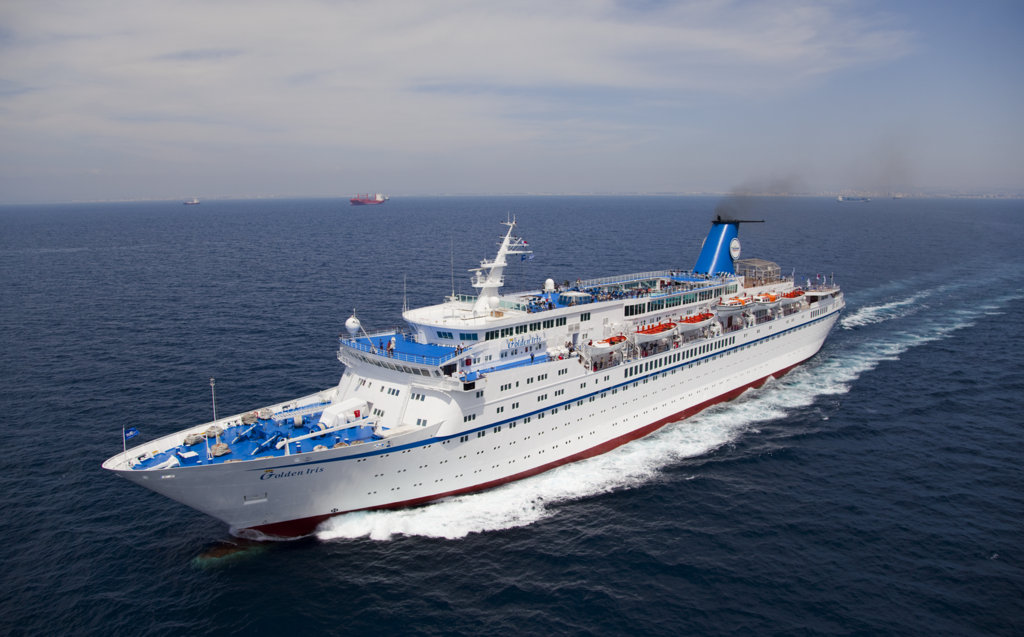
Golden Iris

=== 2009–2021: Golden Iris – 2021–2022: Gold Club – 2022: Old Club ===
Following the sale to Mano Maritime, Rhapsody was renamed Golden Iris. She entered service with Mano Maritime on Mediterranean cruises from Haifa on 31 May 2009, following the completion of a refit. She operated from her home port of Haifa to Cyprus, the Greek Islands, Montenegro, Italy, and Croatia. After the 2018 season she was withdrawn from service, laid up at Chalkis, and replaced by the Crown Iris. In November 2021 she was renamed Gold Club, and in 2022 sold for demolition in Turkey, arriving at a scrapping yard at Aliağa, on 11 July.

== Design ==
Cunard Conquest was designed with a heavily raked bow and a tapering stern. She had a low superstructure that extends slightly outward from the sides of the hull. The open-winged bridge was located two decks above the top deck of the hull.

Like her sister ship Cunard Countess, at delivery Cunard Princess appeared in the traditional red/black Cunard funnel colours, complementing a white hull and superstructure. In addition, a red decorative stripe was painted between the hull and the superstructure. In StarLauro service her funnel was repainted in that company's livery of blue with a black top and a white five-pointed star in the centre. Following the eventual new owners' rebranding into Mediterranean Shipping Cruises, her funnel was repainted white with a dark blue top and gilded MSC logo centrally, while the blue decorative stripe was divided so that top half of the stripe was navy blue and the bottom half grey. Subsequently the funnel colours were altered into dark blue with MSC Cruises' blue/white "compass" logo replacing the earlier MSC logo.
