= Manos (YouTuber) =

Greek Comedy YouTuber

- Born: Giorgos Manolopoulos; 1997 (age 28–29)
- Occupation: YouTuber

YouTube information
- Channel: Manos
- Years active: 2012–present
- Genres: comedy; cooking; music
- Subscribers: 1.69 million
- Views: 448 million
- Last updated: 13 August 2026

Giorgos Manolopoulos (Greek: Γιώργος Μανωλόπουλος, born 1997), better known by his pseudonym Manos, is a Greek YouTuber. He is one of the most popular YouTubers in Greece, best known for his comedy videos, parodies and skits surrounding various topics such as cooking and music. He registered his YouTube channel in 2009, but started uploading videos in 2012. His first username used to be TheManolopoulos before later changing it to Manos.

== YouTube career ==
Ever since he was little he had a passion for making videos. He used to film short comedy skits with his friends for fun. One day he discovered YouTube and immediately got hooked on watching various foreign YouTubers such as PewDiePie, Smosh and KSI. In 2011 he noticed that many Greek people were also making videos on the site, which inspired him to start doing that too.

He started when he was 14 years old, by making several comedy skits and parody videos. In 2014 he started the series Stamatiste To Tragoudi. The next few years his videos started to gather a lot of traction. In September 2016 he started another series on his channel, Mano Mathe Mou.. In 2019 he started two other major series of his channel, Fast Food VS Spitiko and Life Hacks.

In 2020 he reached 1 million subscribers and later released a special video for the milestone. In October 2021 he released the video ΕΝΤΟΜΑ! ΤΙ ΝΑ ΚΑΝΩ?. Afterwards Manos stopped making videos entirely for over a year for personal reasons. On January 2023 he eventually made his comeback with the video MANO MATHE MOU 2023! . He explained that he needed a break, because he wasn't psychologically well and had a pretty unhealthy lifestyle for years. He said this break helped him improve himself.

== Music ==
Manos has produced a lot of parody and comedy songs. In April 2016 he released the song Eimai SWAG, which is the earliest original song in his channel. In November 2016 he released Thelo Na Fao, which as of now has over 8 million views. In 2017 he participated in the TV music contest X Factor (Greece) with the song Thelo Na Fao. In June 2019 he released the song Paralia which became the most popular music video on his channel with over 30 million views.

In January 2026 he released the song Baby. It got really popular, as later that same month it reached No. 1 on Spotify in Greece. On May 8, Manos alongside Dina released the song Keno on Spotify in collaboration with Aktive Records, with music made by Manos and Ioannis Patras, and lyrics written by Manos and Konstantina Evaggelopoulou. On June 17 Manos appeared in the MAD VMA Awards 2026, where he sang his song Keno alongside Dina, and Baby alongside the Greek pop artist LILA.

Manos said he has been into music since he started his YouTube channel, and had released a few rap freestyles under a different name when he was younger. He said he did not have the confidence to show something more personal or serious at the time.

== Personal life ==
Manos was born in 1997. He grew up and currently lives in Thessaloniki. He has a pet dog named Rocky. The nickname "Manos" was given to him by his friends during elementary school. He has said that his friends are behind the cameras when he shoots a skit or a video clip, and they generally help him during the production of his videos.

== See also ==
- List of YouTubers
- List of Greek musical artists
