= MS Knyaz Vladimir =

Cruise ship

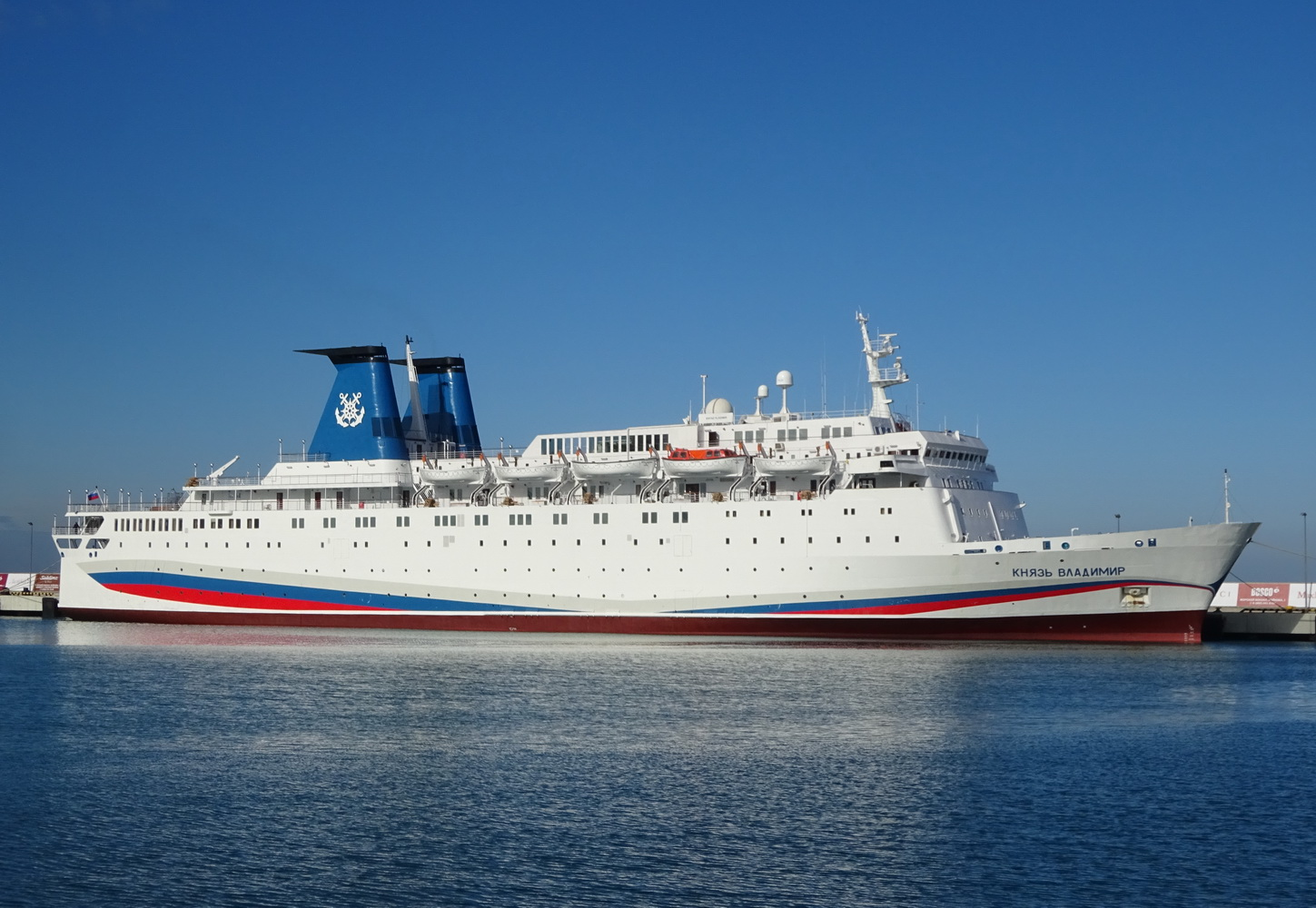
- Knyaz Vladimir docked at Sochi.

History
- Name: 1971–1975: Eagle; 1975–1987: Azur; 1987–2004: The Azur; 2004: Eloise; 2005–2014: Royal Iris; 2014–2017: Roy Star; 2017 onwards: Knyaz Vladimir
- Owner: 2017–2026: Black Sea Cruises LLC.; 2026 onwards: Razvitie Goroda LLC.
- Operator: 1971-1975: Southern Ferries; 1975-1987: Nouvelle Cie. de Paquebots; 1987-1994: Chandris Lines; 1994-2004: Festival Cruises; 2005-2014: Mano Maritime; 2014-2017: laid up; 2017-Present: Black Sea Cruises
- Port of registry: 1971–1975: London, United Kingdom; 1975–1987: Marseille, France; 1987–2017: Panama City, Panama; 2017 onwards: Sochi, Russia
- Builder: Chantiers Dubigeon, Nantes, France
- Yard number: 123
- Launched: October 16, 1970
- Completed: May 16, 1971
- Identification: Call sign: UBRP5; IMO number: 7032997; MMSI number: 273397120
- Status: out of service

General characteristics (per shipparade.com)
- Tonnage: 14,717 gross tonnage (GT)
- Length: 142.12 m (466 ft)
- Beam: 21.90 m (72 ft)
- Speed: 18 knots
- Capacity: 770
- Crew: 325

General characteristics (after reclassification)
- Tonnage: 9,159 GT, 2,085 DWT

MS Knyaz Vladimir is a 1971 built car ferry/cruise ferry which was later rebuilt into a cruise ship in 1981. She is the last surviving ship ever owned by the Chandris Lines. She is the last surviving ship out of three near identical sisters, the others being the ill-fated Scandinavian Star and the Fred. Olsen & Co. ferry Bolero. In late 2014, Mano Cruise stopped the ship's service.

== 1971-1987 ==
In 1971, the British company Southern Ferries, a subsidiary of P&O Ferries, launched the MV Eagle for a new car/cruise ferry service, a six-day-long Southampton-Lisbon-Tangier itinerary. She did not stay in service with her original owners for very long, as the route she was designed for proved unsuccessful, and in 1975 she was sold to the Paquet Cruises subsidiary Nouvelle Cie. de Paquebots. Her new owners had her repainted white and renamed Azur, carrying out cruise and ferry voyages in the Mediterranean. This continued on uneventfully until 1981 when Paquet decided to drop ferry services completely and rebuild Azur into a full-time cruise ship, with many extra cabins being built into her car decks, and an extra swimming pool installed on her stern. In 1987 Paquet sold Azur to the Greek cruise company Chandris Lines.

== 1987-2004 ==
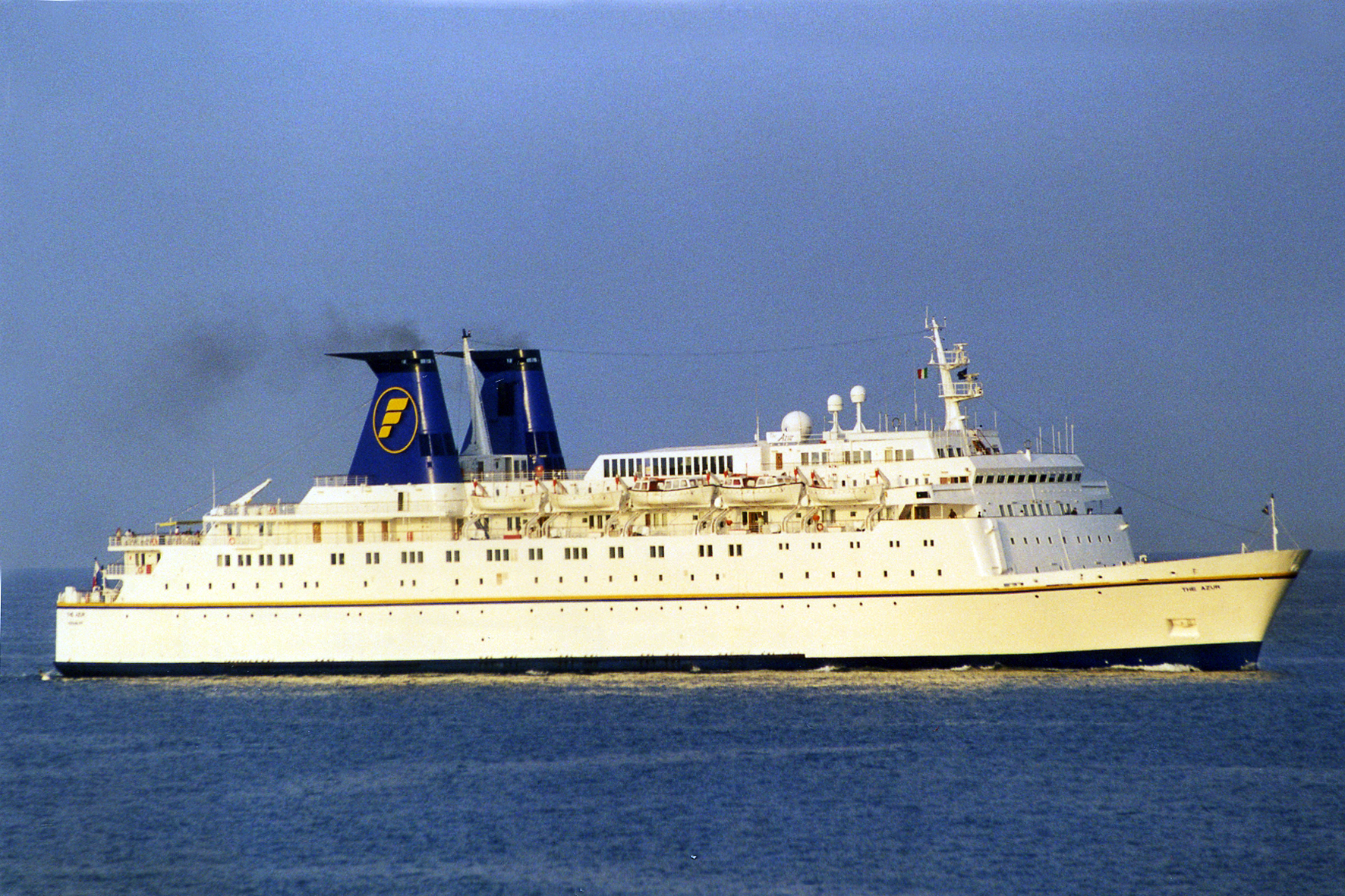
The Azur in Genoa, Italy 2001.

Upon entering service with Chandris's subsidiary Chandris Fantasy Cruises, she was renamed The Azur, and her funnels were painted the traditional Chandris blue with a white chi. By 1994 Chandris was "phasing out" their Fantasy Cruises brand, doing so by selling The Azur to Festival Cruises. Festival had The Azur cruise on voyages out of Venice and Genoa until they declared bankruptcy in 2004. When this happened The Azur was placed under arrest by harbor authorities Gibraltar. At Festival Cruises bankruptcy sale, The Azur was sold to the Israel-based Mano Maritime for over US$10 million.

== 2005-Present ==
Upon entering service for them, Mano Maritime renamed her the Royal Iris and painted a smiling yellow fish on both sides of her hull. On 21 June 2005 a small fire broke out on board while the ship was anchored off Samos. It was quickly extinguished by the crew. Until 2014 Royal Iris regularly set out on cruises through the Greek Islands and Cyprus. In 2014 Mano Cruises stopped the ship's operations, and renamed it to Roy Star. The liner arrived in the Greek port of Chalcis (Chalkida) for lay up on November 6, 2014. On 28 January 2017 Cruise Industry News reported that the vessel would enter into service for Sovfracht and Rosmorport in a joint venture calling on ports in the Black Sea including Crimea, Yalta, Sevastopol and Istanbul, with the ship sailing round-trip from Sochi. Ship was bought for around 11.2 million euros. A new company was founded "Black Sea Cruises" based in Sochi. The ship has Russian flag.

On March 2026, a purchase agreement was concluded with the Moscow company Razvitie Goroda LLC, whose core business has so far been in the catering and delivery service sector. The purchase price was not disclosed. Rosmorport justified the sale by saying that the ship's traditional areas of operation in the Black Sea could no longer be used economically due to the geopolitical situation. In addition, there were high costs for maintenance and repair of a ship that had been stationary for years. According to Russian media, the operator has recently posted permanent losses, in fiscal year 2025 alone, the net loss was around 200 million rubles (about 2.2 million euros). The Russian cruise operator Black Sea Cruises LLC would be voluntarily liquidated. Several attempts to sell the ship were initially unsuccessful. The last auction was scheduled with a starting price of 873.5 million rubles (about 9.7 million euros), but found no interested parties. At the same time, a liquidation commission was set up, chaired by Andrei Donchenko. Creditors could register their claims within two months of the publication of the notice.

== On board features ==
On board Royal Iris there are three swimming pools, two night clubs, a discotheque, sauna, sports facilities, a casino, hairdressing salon and movie theater.
