= Manos (name) =

Manos (Greek: Μάνος) is both a surname and a given name. Notable people with the name include:

Surname:

- Aspasia Manos (1896–1972), the Greek wife of Alexander I
- Constantine Manos (1934–2025), Greek-American photographer
- John Michael Manos (1922–2006), U.S. federal judge
- Stefanos Manos (born 1939), Greek politician

Given name:

- Manos Hadjidakis (1925–1994), Greek composer
- Manos Katrakis (1908–1984), Greek actor
- Manos Loïzos (1937–1982), Greek songwriter
- Manos Papayiannis (born 1966), Greek actor
