= Mano machine =

Theoretical computer by M. Morris Mano

The Mano machine is a computer theoretically described by M. Morris Mano. It contains a central processing unit, random access memory, and an input-output bus. Its limited instruction set and small address space limit it to use as a microcontroller, but it can easily be expanded to have a 32-bit accumulator register, and 28-bit addressing using a hardware description language like Verilog or VHDL; and at the same time, make room for new instructions.

== Characteristics ==
The Mano machine is similar in many respects to the PDP-8, such as the same address space, only one accumulator register, and many similar instructions. The Mano machine has a 4096x16 shared data/program memory segment requiring a 12-bit address bus. The data bus is 16 bits. There are 8-bit input/output buses for external communication, and associated interrupt flags.

There is one 16-bit accumulator register, and single-bit registers (latches) for addition carry and system halt.

== Instruction set ==
There are 25 instructions that fall into 3 categories: direct / indirect memory referencing operations, register referencing operations, and input/output/interrupt operations.

Each instruction is 16 bits long [4 nybbles, or 1 word]. This means that memory referencing instructions contain 4 bits of op-code data, and 12 bits dedicated to the address.

Bit 15	Bits 14-12	Bits 11-0	Mnemonic	Description
0	0	(Direct address)	AND	And direct memory to accumulator
0	1	(Direct address)	ADD	Add direct memory to accumulator (affects carry bit)
0	2	(Direct address)	LDA	Load direct memory to accumulator
0	3	(Direct address)	STA	Store accumulator to direct memory
0	4	(Direct address)	BUN	Unconditionally branch to direct memory
0	5	(Direct address)	BSA	Store current program counter to direct memory and branch to following address
0	6	(Direct address)	ISZ	Increment value in direct memory and skip next instruction if the sum is zero
1	0-6	(Indirect address)		Indirect addressing versions of the above instructions
0	7	800	CLA	Clear the accumulator
0	7	400	CLE	Clear the carry bit
0	7	200	CMA	Complement the accumulator
0	7	100	CME	Complement the carry bit
0	7	080	CIR	Circulate accumulator right (through carry bit)
0	7	040	CIL	Circulate accumulator left (through carry bit)
0	7	020	INC	Increment accumulator (does not affect carry bit)
0	7	010	SPA	Skip next instruction if accumulator is positive
0	7	008	SNA	Skip next instruction if accumulator is negative
0	7	004	SZA	Skip next instruction if accumulator is zero
0	7	002	SZE	Skip next instruction if carry bit is zero
0	7	001	HLT	Halt computer by clearing the halt bit latch
1	7	800	INP	Input from character bus to accumulator
1	7	400	OUT	Output from accumulator to character bus
1	7	200	SKI	Skip next instruction if input flag is set
1	7	100	SKO	Skip next instruction if output flag is set
1	7	080	ION	Enable interrupts
1	7	040	IOF	Disable interrupts

== Applications to computer optimization theory ==
The machine specifications include a finite-state machine that determines the processor's micro-operations. The canonical implementation of the state machine is an excellent candidate for reduction, and can also be re-implemented as a pipelined processor.
