= Mano Maritime =

Israeli shipping company

Mano Maritime Ltd
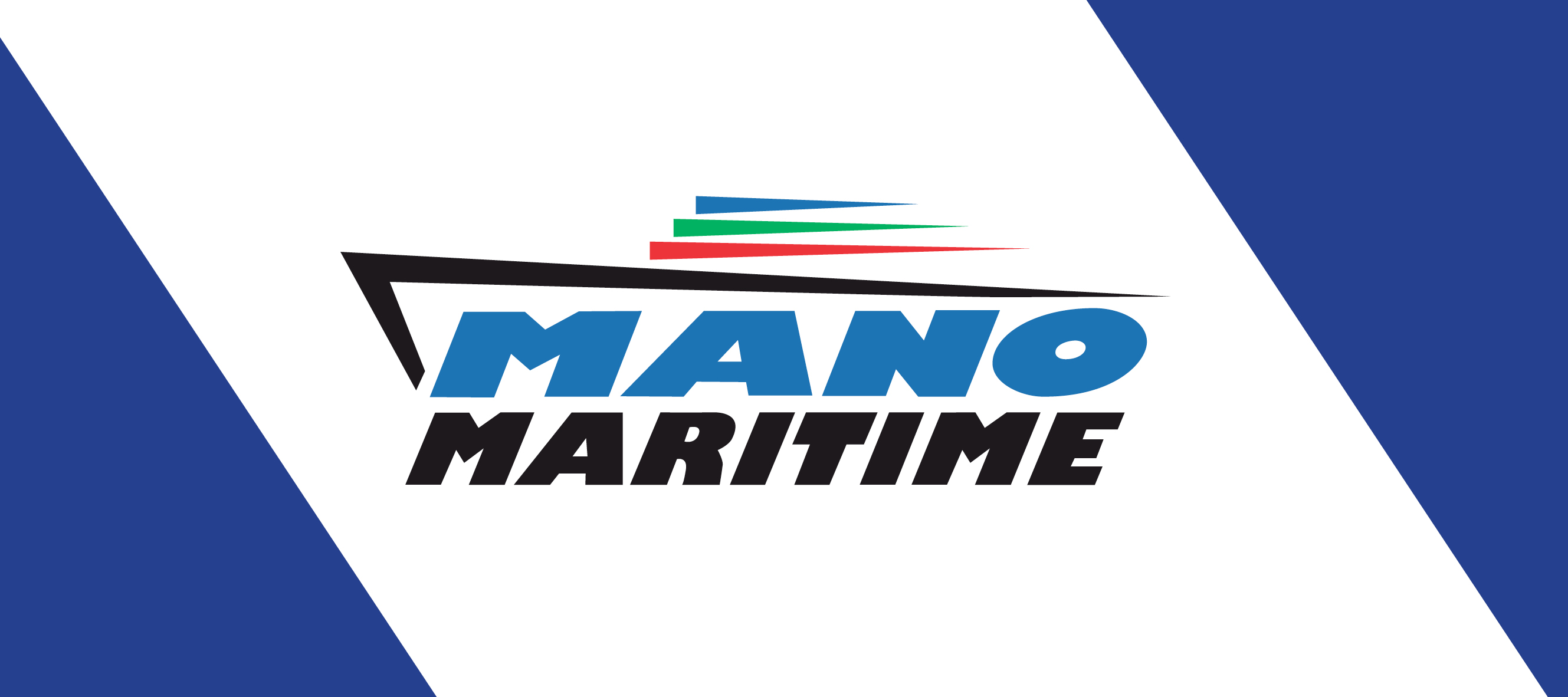
- Company type: Shipping
- Industry: Maritime transport Cruises
- Founder: Moshe Mano
- Headquarters: Haifa, Israel
- Area served: Worldwide
- Services: Shipping operations
- Owner: Moshe Mano
- Parent: Mano Holdings Group
- Subsidiaries: Mano Holidays; Mano Logistics
- Website: mano.co.il

Mano Maritime (Hebrew: מנו ספנות, Mano Sapanut) is a shipping company founded by Moshe Mano and is a subsidiary of the Mano Holdings Group. It operates cargo ships, passenger ships and undertakes other maritime services. The company was ranked in Dun’s top companies in Israel: number 5 in the transportation services and number 31 in the services companies. The company also includes in BDI Code of leading companies in Israel: number 36 in the services companies, number 8 in the transportations companies. and number 187 in the general list Mano is the owner, chairman, and president of the company.

== History ==
In the 1930s, Moshe’s father, Mordechai Mano (born in Thessaloniki, Greece), immigrated to Israel with his family. His son, Moshe Mano was born in 1955 in Haifa and received education in the field of shipping. In his thirties, he established a shipping company, named Mano Maritime which became an independent company, active both in cruise and cargo shipping. Over the years the company diversified its activities as part of the Mano Holdings Group and has interests in other areas including real estate, hotels and technology.

== Cargo Ships and Fleet ==
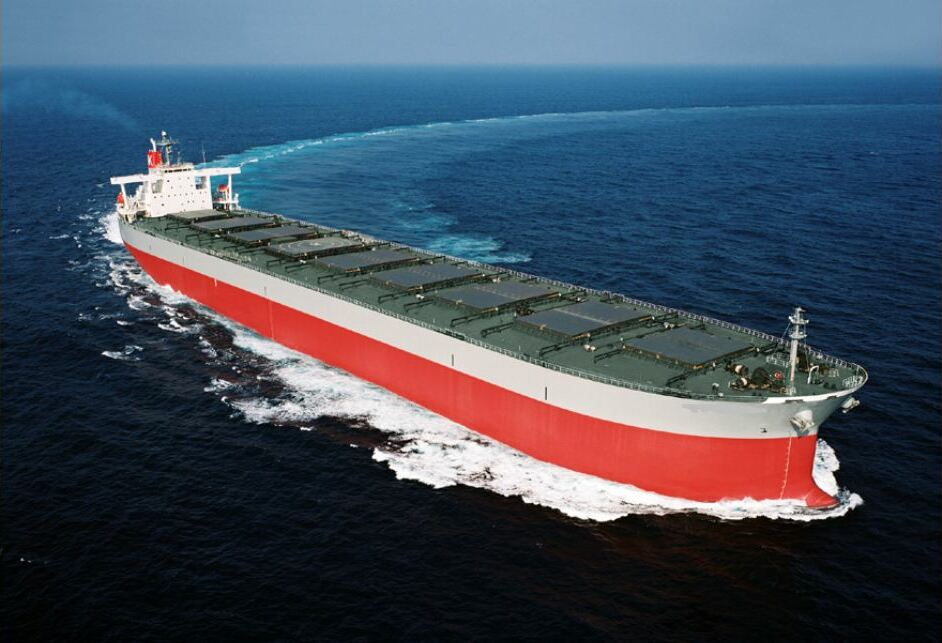
Cape Friendship, Bulk carrier, 185,000 DWT

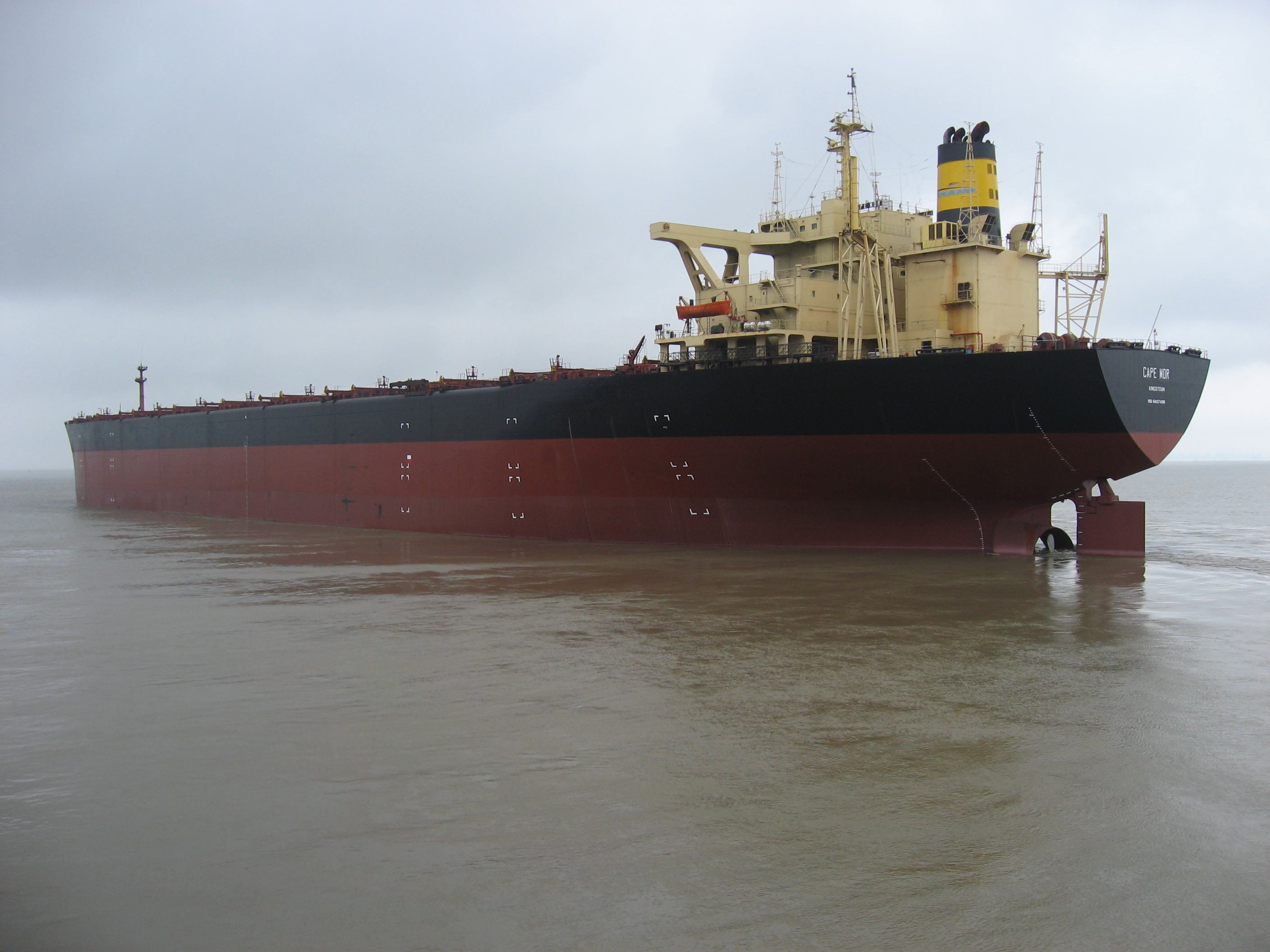
196,000 DWT - Meters 300 LOA.

Mano Maritime is involved in various fields of the shipping business as owner, operator, and manager of cargo ships. It also offers services in international maritime transport and serves as representative and general agent in Israel for the Japanese shipping company "K" Line and Neptune Line shipping company. Furthermore, it acts as the local agent for various shipping lines based in Spain, Russia, Ukraine, Greece, and Germany. Mano Maritime also transports coal to the Israel Electric Corporation’s power plants in Israel.

Mano Maritime owns 50% of the shares of Crown Shipping, the remaining 50% are owned by the Borchard family of England. Crown Shipping is the representative and general agent in Israel of Ocean Network Express Corporation- “ONE”.

== Cruise Ships ==
Mano Maritime operates holiday cruises from the ports of Haifa and Ashdod, Israel. The destinations are Cyprus, Greek islands, France, Croatia, Malta and Italy.

=== Current fleet ===
Ship	Flag	Built	Last Refurbished	In service	Gross Tonnage	Ship Status	Photo
Crown Iris	Panama	1992	2018-2019	2019–Present	40,876 GRT	In Service	

=== Former fleet ===
Ship	Flag	Built	In service	Gross Tonnage	Status	Photo
Silver Star		1964	1998-2003	6,092	Capsized 2006	
Iris		1982	2001-2010	12,907	In service as Ocean Endeavour for Adventure Canada.	
The Jasmine		1981	2001-2006	9,878	Scrapped in 2014	
Royal Iris	Panama	1970	2005–2014. Sold to Black Sea Cruises in 2017	14,717 GRT	In service as Knyaz Vladimir for Black Sea Cruises	
Golden Iris	Panama	1975	2010-2018	17,496 GRT	Scrapped in Aliağa,2022	

== See also ==
- Transportation in Israel
