= Mano (footballer, born 1984) =

Mozambican footballer

Personal information
- Full name: Celso Halilo de Abdul
- Date of birth: 28 April 1984 (age 42)
- Place of birth: Xai-Xai, Mozambique
- Height: 1.83 m (6 ft 0 in)
- Position: Defender

Team information
- Current team: El Gounah

Senior career*
Years	Team	Apps	(Gls)
2000–2004	Desportivo Maputo		
2004–2006	Al-Sahel	46	(16)
2006	El Gounah	6	(1)
2006–2014	ENPPI	74	(7)
2014–2015	El Gounah	31	(2)
2016–2019	UD Songo		

International career^{‡}
2002–2018	Mozambique	33	(1)
- * Club domestic league appearances and goals ‡ National team caps and goals as of 27 May 2018

Celso Halilo de Abdul (born 28 April 1984 in Gaza Province, Mozambique) is a professional Mozambican football player who plays for El Gounah.

== International career ==
=== International goals ===
Scores and results list Mozambique's goal tally first.

No	Date	Venue	Opponent	Score	Result	Competition
1.	24 March 2007	Stade du 4 Août, Ouagadougou, Burkina Faso	Burkina Faso	1–0	1–1	2008 Africa Cup of Nations qualification
