= Mano (footballer, born 1987) =

Portuguese footballer

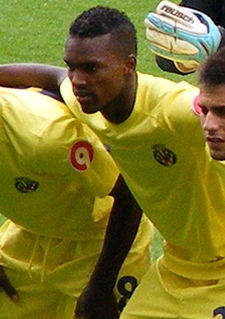
- Mano lining up for Villarreal

Personal information
- Full name: Luís Miguel Lopes Mendes
- Date of birth: 9 April 1987 (age 39)
- Place of birth: Lisbon, Portugal
- Height: 1.70 m (5 ft 7 in)
- Position: Right-back

Youth career
- 1996–2003: Almada
- 2003–2004: Corroios
- 2004–2006: Belenenses

Senior career*
| Years | Team | Apps | (Gls) |
| 2006–2010 | Belenenses | 60 | (0) |
| 2010–2012 | Villarreal B | 36 | (0) |
| 2012 | Levadiakos | 1 | (0) |
| 2012–2018 | Estoril | 112 | (0) |
| 2018–2022 | Vitória Setúbal | 76 | (0) |
| Total | | 285 | (0) |

International career
| 2006 | Portugal U19 | 6 | (0) |
| 2006–2007 | Portugal U20 | 13 | (0) |
| 2007 | Portugal U21 | 2 | (0) |
- * Club domestic league appearances and goals

Luís Miguel Lopes Mendes (born 9 April 1987), known as Mano, is a Portuguese former professional footballer who played mainly as a right-back.

== Club career ==
A product of C.F. Os Belenenses' youth system, Lisbon-born Mano first appeared with the first team on 4 February 2007 in a 1–0 away win against Vitória de Setúbal. He had to wait until the 2008–09 season to become an important member of the main squad.

Mano featured in 28 games in the 2009–10 campaign but Belenenses finished as second-bottom in the Primeira Liga, dropping down to the Segunda Liga. In August 2010 he moved to Villarreal CF B in Spain, playing 31 Segunda División matches in his first year (27 starts) as the Valencians retained their league status; his debut in the latter competition took place later that month, when he came on as a late substitute in the 3–0 away loss to Real Valladolid.

On 5 June 2012, following a brief spell in the Super League Greece with Levadiakos FC, Mano returned to Portugal and signed a two-year contract with G.D. Estoril Praia. He appeared in 27 games in his second season, helping to a best ever fourth-place finish and qualification for the UEFA Europa League.

Mano joined Vitória Setúbal in June 2018, on a two-year deal.

== International career ==
Born in Portugal of Cape Verdean descent, Mano represented Portugal at the 2007 FIFA U-20 World Cup, also appearing in other minor tournaments. In the competition held in Canada, in the round-of-16 defeat against Chile (1–0), he was going to be sent off by referee Subkhiddin Mohd Salleh for a foul when teammate Zequinha stripped the judge of his red card, receiving his marching orders as well; subsequently, both players were suspended from international football, Mano for three months.

Mano won the first of two caps for the under-21 side on 23 March 2007, featuring the second half of a 2–0 friendly victory over Slovakia.
