= List of ship launches in 1993 =

The list of ship launches in 1993 includes a chronological list of all ships launched in 1993.

Date	Ship	Class / type	Builder	Location	Country	Notes
16 January	Harpers Ferry	Harpers Ferry-class dock landing ship	Avondale Shipyard	Avondale, Louisiana	United States	
21 January	Bad Bevensen	Frankenthal-class minehunter	Lürssen		Germany	For German Navy
22 January	Wakashio	Harushio-class submarine			Japan	
23 January	Europa	cruiseferry	Meyer Werft	Papenburg	Germany	Completed as Silja Europa for Silja Line
6 February	Yukon	Henry J. Kaiser-class replenishment oiler	Avondale Shipyard	Avondale, Louisiana	United States	
20 February	Laboon	Arleigh Burke-class destroyer	Bath Iron Works	Bath, Maine	United States	
14 March	Germinal	Floréal-class frigate	Chantiers de l'Atlantique	Saint-Nazaire	France	
27 March	Sovcomflot Senator	Bonn Express-class container ship	Howaldtswerke-Deutsche Werft	Kiel	Germany	For DSR-Senator.
6 April	Richmond	Type 23 frigate	Swan Hunter	Wallsend	United Kingdom	
29 April	Grömitz	Frankenthal-class minehunter	Kröger		Germany	For German Navy
7 May	Mitscher	Arleigh Burke-class destroyer	Ingalls Shipbuilding	Pascagoula, Mississippi	United States	
19 May	DSR Asia	BV 2700-type container ship	Thyssen Nordseewerke	Emden	Germany	
25 May	Caledonian Isles	Ferry	Ferguson Shipbuilders	Port Glasgow	United Kingdom	For Caledonian MacBrayne
4 June	Mysore	Delhi-class destroyer	Mazagon Dock Limited	Mumbai	India	
5 June	Knock Clune	Suezmax Tanker	Harland & Wolff	Belfast	United Kingdom	For Fred Olsen & Co
21 June	Canarias	Santa María-class frigate	Bazan	Ferrol	Spain	
26 June	Fredericton	Halifax-class frigate	Saint John Shipbuilding	Saint John, New Brunswick	Canada	
28 June	Dole America	Stocznia Gdanska B369 reefer	Stocznia Gdańska	Gdańsk	Poland	For Reefership Marine Services
June	Cougar Ace	RO-RO car carrier	K K Kanasashi Co	Toyohashi	Japan	For Mitsui OSK Lines
3 July	Surcouf	La Fayette-class frigate			France	
17 July	Rhode Island	Ohio-class submarine	Electric Boat	Groton, Connecticut	United States	
24 July	Paul Hamilton	Arleigh Burke-class destroyer	Bath Iron Works	Bath, Maine	United States	
13 August	Boxer	Wasp-class amphibious assault ship	Ingalls Shipbuilding	Pascagoula, Mississippi	United States	
13 August	Nordlys	Richard With-class ferry	Volkswerft GmbH	Stralsund	Germany	For Troms Fylkes Damskibsselskap
19 August	Kirishima	Kongō-class destroyer	Mitsubishi Heavy Industries	Nagasaki	Japan	
28 August	Collins	Collins-class submarine	Australian Submarine Corporation	Osborne, South Australia	Australia	
28 August	Toledo	Los Angeles-class submarine	Newport News Shipbuilding	Newport News, Virginia	United States	
4 September	Humber Marlin	Dredger	Appledore Shipbuilders Ltd.	Appledore	United Kingdom	For Associated British Ports.
27 September	Chi Kuang	Cheng Kung-class frigate	China Shipbuilding	Kaohsiung	Taiwan	
29 September	Victorious	Vanguard-class submarine	Vickers Shipbuilding and Engineering Ltd	Barrow-in-Furness	United Kingdom	For Royal Navy
2 October	Carter Hall	Harpers Ferry-class dock landing ship	Avondale Shipyard	Avondale, Louisiana	United States	
5 October	Todendorf	Todendorf-class securing boat	Lürssen	Bremen	Germany	For German Navy
20 October	Russell	Arleigh Burke-class destroyer	Ingalls Shipbuilding	Pascagoula, Mississippi	United States	
30 October	Arctic	Supply-class fast combat support ship	National Steel & Shipbuilding	San Diego, California	United States	
October	Qingdao	Type 052 destroyer	Hudong Shipyard	Shanghai	China	
11 November	John C. Stennis	Nimitz-class aircraft carrier	Newport News Shipbuilding & Dry Dock Company	Newport News, Virginia	United States	
26 November	Dole Asia	Stocznia Gdanska B369 reefer	Stocznia Gdańska	Gdańsk	Poland	For Reefership Marine Services
3 December	San Giusto	San Giorgio-class amphibious transport dock	Fincantieri		Italy	
4 December	Hartford	Los Angeles-class submarine	Electric Boat	Groton, Connecticut	United States	
9 December	Spetsai	Hydra-class frigate	Hellenic Shipyards Co.		Greece	
9 December	HM Bark Endeavour Replica			Fremantle, Western Australia	Australia	Ship replica of HMS Endeavour
10 December	Dole Europa	Stocznia Gdanska B369 reefer	Stocznia Gdańska	Gdańsk	Poland	For Reefership Marine Services
Unknown date	Bestore	Bulk carrier	Sanoyas Hishino Meisho	Kita-ku, Osaka	Japan	
Unknown date	Bobby B	Launch	David Abels Boatbuilders Ltd.	Bristol	United Kingdom	For private owner.
Unknown date	Grey Bear	Launch	David Abels Boatbuilders Ltd.	Bristol	United Kingdom	For private owner.
Unknown date	Omskiy-205	General cargo ship	Krasnoyarsk Shipyard	Krasnoyarsk	Russia	
Unknown date	Sir William Pulteney	Passenger launch	David Abels Boatbuilders Ltd.	Bristol	United Kingdom	For Pulteney Cruisers Ltd.
Unknown date	Sprirt of Freedom II	Passenger launch	David Abels Boatbuilders Ltd.	Bristol	United Kingdom	For The Willow Trust.
Unknown date	Unnamed	Ro-ro ferry	Sudostroitelnyy Zavod Severnaya Verf	Saint Petersburg	Russia	Completed in 2000 as Regal Star in Italy.
