= MS Bluefort =

1979 ferry

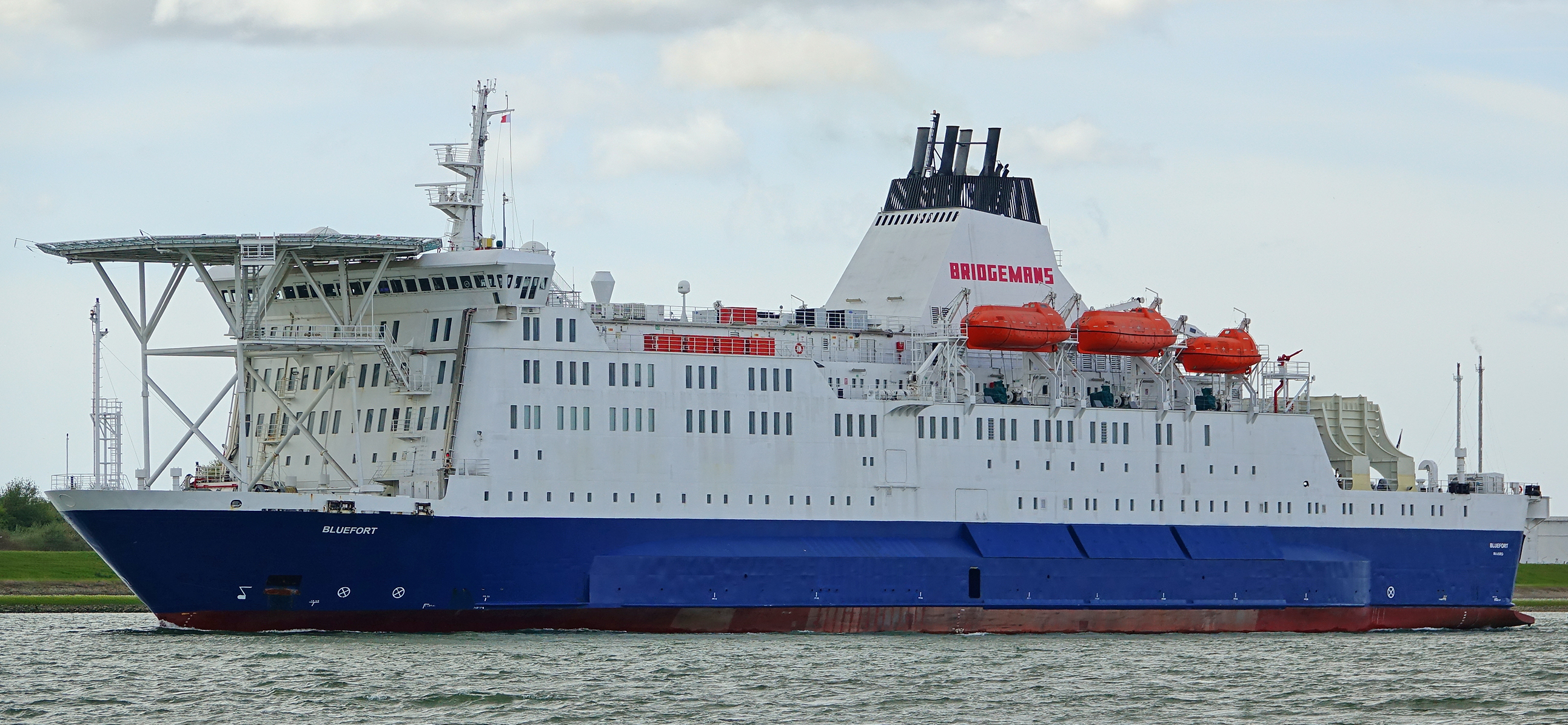
- Bluefort at Maassluis in 2017

History
- Name: 1979: Diana II av Slite; 1979–1994: Diana II; 1994: Vironia; 1994–1996: Mare Balticum; 1996–2007: Meloodia; 2007–2013: ARV 1; 2013–2021: Bluefort
- Owner: 1979–1989: Rederi AB Slite; 1989–1994: PK Finans; 1994–2002: Nordström & Thulin; 2002–2007: Tallink; 2007–2013: Equinox Offshore Accommodation; 2013–2015: Highclere; 2015–2021: Bridgemans Services Group LP
- Operator: 1979–1992: Rederi AB Slite; 1992–1994: TR-Line; 1994–1996: EstLine; 1996–2006: Tallink; 2006–2007: Baleària; 2015–2021: Bridgemans Services Group LP
- Port of registry: 1979–1992: Slite, Sweden; 1992–1994: Rostock, Germany; 1994–2007: Tallinn, Estonia; 2008–2013: Nassau, Bahamas; 2013–2021: Majuro, Marshall Islands
- Builder: Meyer Werft, Papenburg, Germany
- Yard number: 592
- Launched: 31 March 1979
- Completed: 1979
- Acquired: 9 June 1979
- In service: 14 June 1979
- Out of service: 2021
- Identification: Call sign: V7CC4; IMO number: 7816874; MMSI number: 538005239
- Fate: Scrapped at Alang, India in 2021

General characteristics (as built)
- Tonnage: 11,671 GRT; 2,400 DWT
- Length: 141.7 m (464 ft 11 in)
- Beam: 24.21 m (79 ft 5 in)
- Draught: 5.50 m (18 ft 1 in)
- Installed power: 4 × MAN 8L40/45; 17,650 kW (combined)
- Speed: 15 knots (28 km/h; 17 mph)
- Capacity: 210 passengers; 210 single berths

General characteristics (as Meloodia)
- Tonnage: 17,955 GT
- Length: 138.90 m (455 ft 9 in)
- Capacity: 210 passengers; 210 single berths

General characteristics (as Bluefort)
- Tonnage: 17,914 GT; 6,074 NT; 2,420 DWT
- Length: 141.7 m (464 ft 11 in)
- Beam: 27.8 m (91 ft 2 in)
- Draught: 5.75 m (18 ft 10 in)

MS Bluefort was an accommodation vessel owned by the Canadian-based company Bridgemans Services Group LP. She was built in 1979 as a car/passenger ferry by Meyer Werft, Papenburg, Germany as Diana II av Slite for Rederi AB Slite for use in Viking Line's traffic. She has also sailed under the names Diana II, Vironia, Mare Balticum, Meloodia and ARV 1.

== Background ==
=== Tonnage war in the Baltic ===
Rederi AB Slite had great success with their first generation of car and passenger ferries servicing between Sweden and Finland and by the late 1970s the growing market demanded larger ships. Slite's first route within the Viking Line marketing company had been that between Kapellskär and Naantali but this route had since been clogged with Viking Line ships and received competition from Silja Line's similar service between Norrtälje and Turku.

As a first step to find new markets, Rederi AB Slite had sold their merely six years old Apollo in 1976 and replaced her with the older Apollo III, making 24-hour cruises between Stockholm and Mariehamn. The company still served the Kapellskär—Naantali route with their other ship, the 1972-built Diana. But with four other Viking Line ships competing for the same cars and passengers on that route, Slite still needed to break new grounds to keep themselves profitable.

In 1974, the two other Viking Line partners started operating the Stockholm—Turku route which proved to be quite profitable. In preparation for the new ten-year agreement of collaboration between the Viking Line partners to be settled in 1980, Slite made the decision to try to push out Rederi Ab Sally from the Stockholm—Turku route with a newbuilding that would outmatch their current ship there, the Viking 4.

=== Design and order ===
The new ship was planned together with her contracted builders, Meyer Werft, Papenburg in West Germany. This shipyard had built the Apollo and the Diana for Slite as well as four sister vessels for Rederi Ab Sally. The design greatly resembled the former ships but the newbuilding was larger in every respect. Among the distinguishing differences were the addition of a second car deck as well as a larger number of berths. The new ship was named M/S Diana II af Slite and launching took place on March 31, 1979.

== Operational career ==
=== Entry into service ===
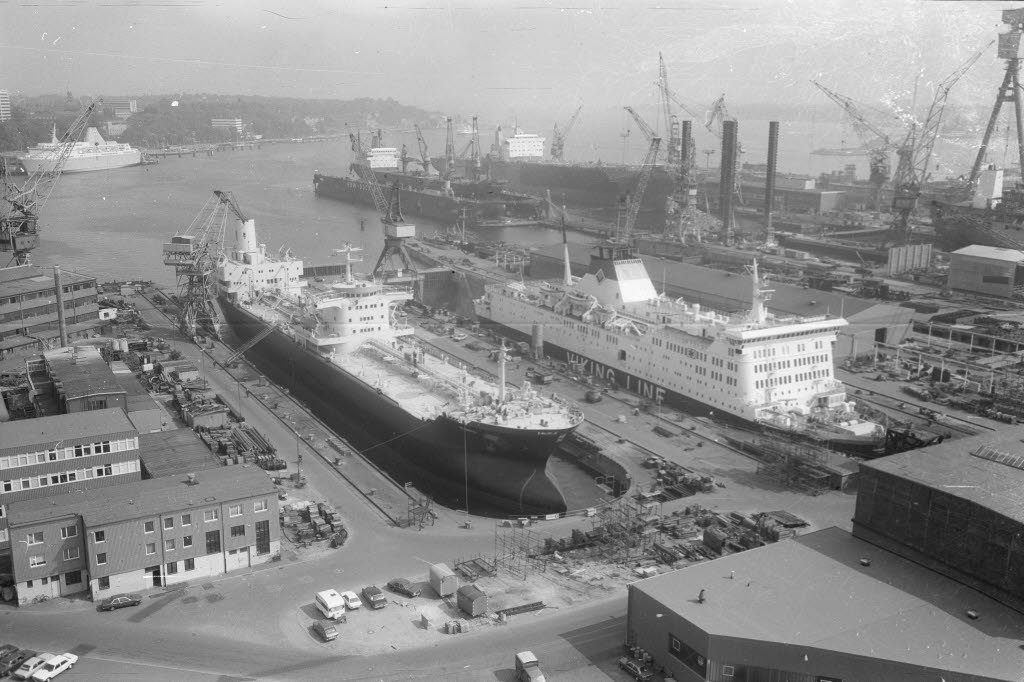
Diana II at Kiel.

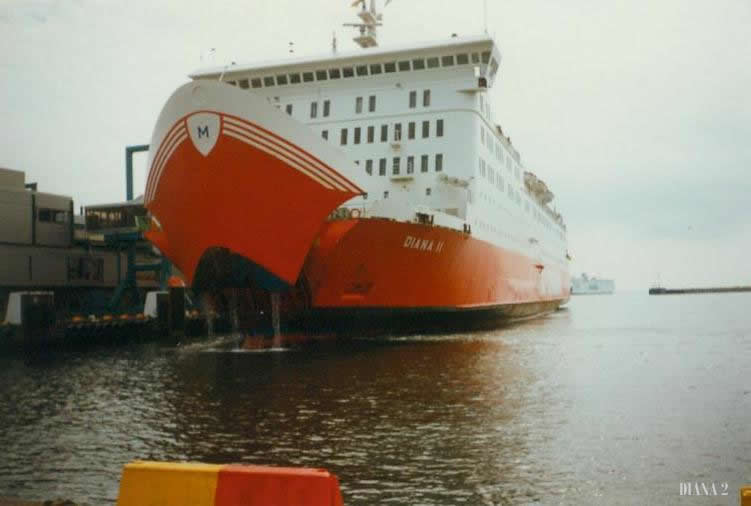
Diana II

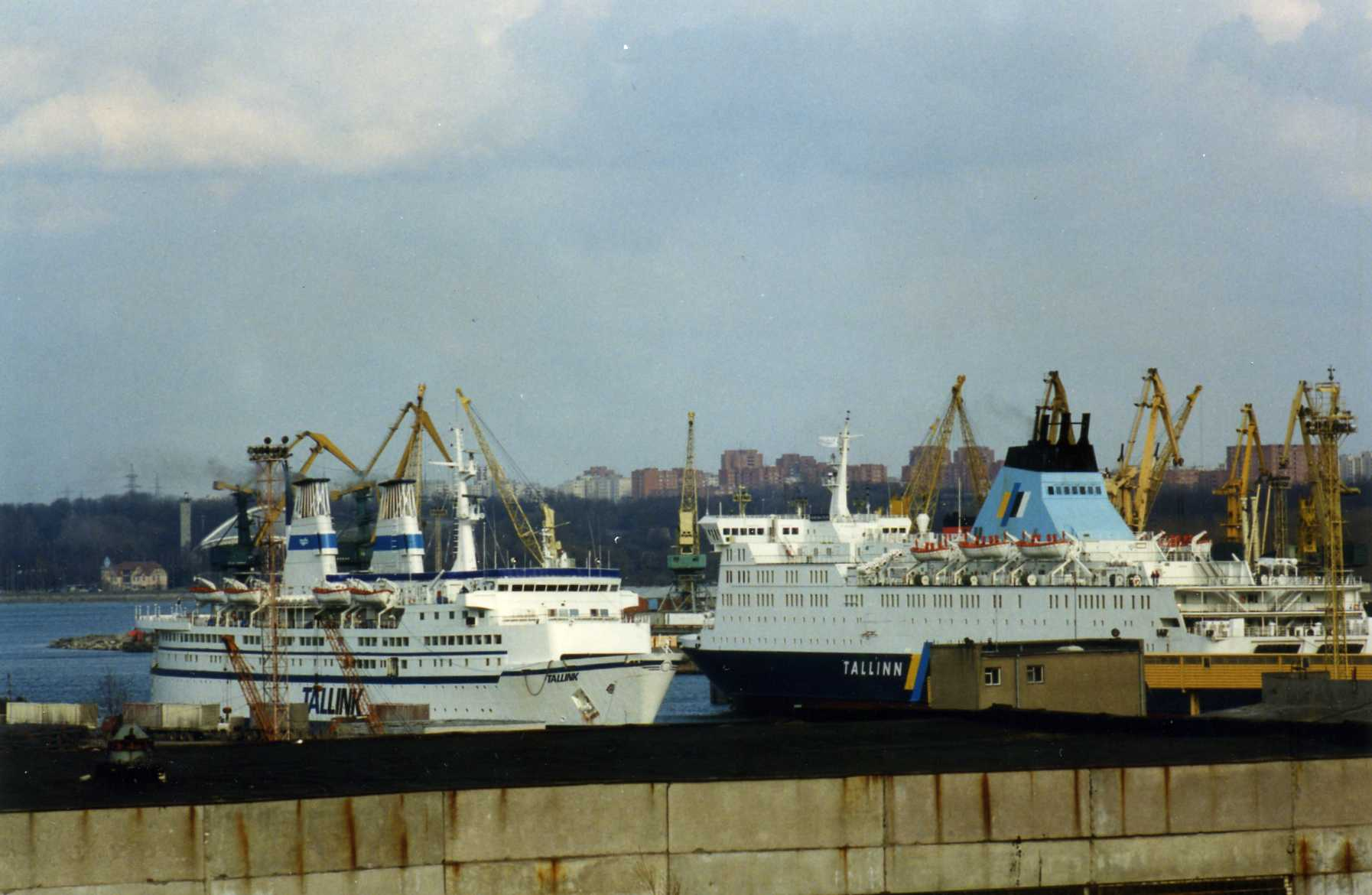
Mare Balticum and Tallink.

Less than three months after her launch, the ship was delivered to Rederi AB Slite. On June 14, 1979, she was put into Viking Line service between Stockholm and Turku with daytime callings at Mariehamn, replacing the Viking 4. In September the same year, her registered name was shortened to Diana II, although this had been her marketing name since her delivery.

At the beginning of the summer season 1981, Diana II was transferred to the Kapellskär-Naantali route. Although she returned on the Stockholm-Turku during the summer of 1982, the Diana II remained on the Kapellskär-Naantali route for the rest of her Viking Line career.

During her time in Viking Line service, the Diana II encountered one serious incident. On February 5, 1989, she touched ground near Kapellskär and started taking in water. Due to her pumping system at the time only operated at half of its capacity, the ship took in a substantial amount of water and partially sunk in the shallow harbour of Kapellskär. She was soon refloated however and was docked for repairs.

=== Sale and charter contracts ===
In order to finance their newbuilding Kalypso which had been a victim of the bankruptcy of Wärtsilä Marine, Rederi AB Slite had to sell the Diana II to PK-Banken in 1989. The ship was chartered back to Slite and route remained unaltered.

As Slite's finances got worse during 1992 the company was forced to give the ship up altogether and by December 24 that year, the Diana II made her last sailing for Rederi AB Slite and Viking Line. PK-Banken chartered her to TT-Line and she started operating under their brand TR-Line's route Trelleborg—Rostock on December 30.

The Diana II operated on her new route until September 1994 when she was sold to Nordström & Thulin and Estonian Shipping Company who renamed her Vironia with the intention of putting her into service within the EstLine service between Stockholm and Tallinn together with her former Viking Line fleet mate Viking Sally, by now known as Estonia.

=== Estonian operations ===
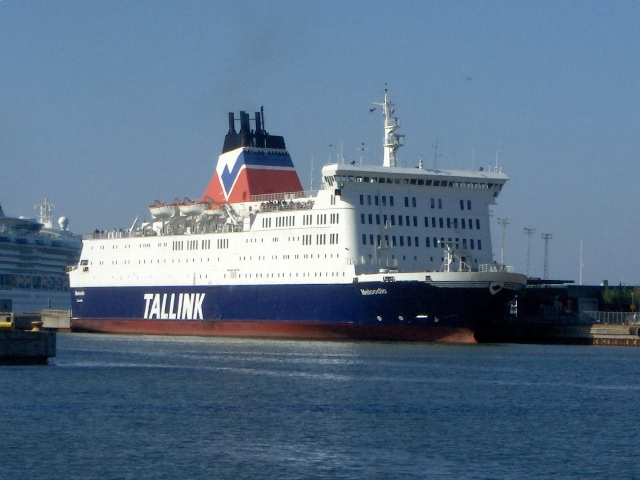
Meloodia at Tallinn

Only weeks before the Vironia was due to enter service on her new route, Estonia sank in a storm killing 852 people. The bow visor construction of Estonia, which caused her sinking, was of the same type as that of the Vironia. As a result of the disaster, the Vironia was renamed Mare Balticum to avoid association with the sunken ship due to the similar name ("Viro" means "Estonia" in Finnish). She was docked and rebuilt in Naantali and her bow visor was welded shut. She eventually entered service on Stockholm-Tallinn on November 11, 1994.

Two years later, Nordström & Thulin acquired another former Viking Line vessel, Anna K. She was renamed Regina Baltica and replaced the Mare Balticum in August 1996. The Mare Balticum was chartered to Hansatee shipping OY and was renamed Meloodia. The ship's bow was rebuilt with bow gates and she was put into Tallink service on the Tallinn—Helsinki route on September 20, 1996. The Meloodia's ownership changed to Tallink's in February 2002 but she remained on the same service until New Year's Eve 2006.

=== New charter contracts and sale ===
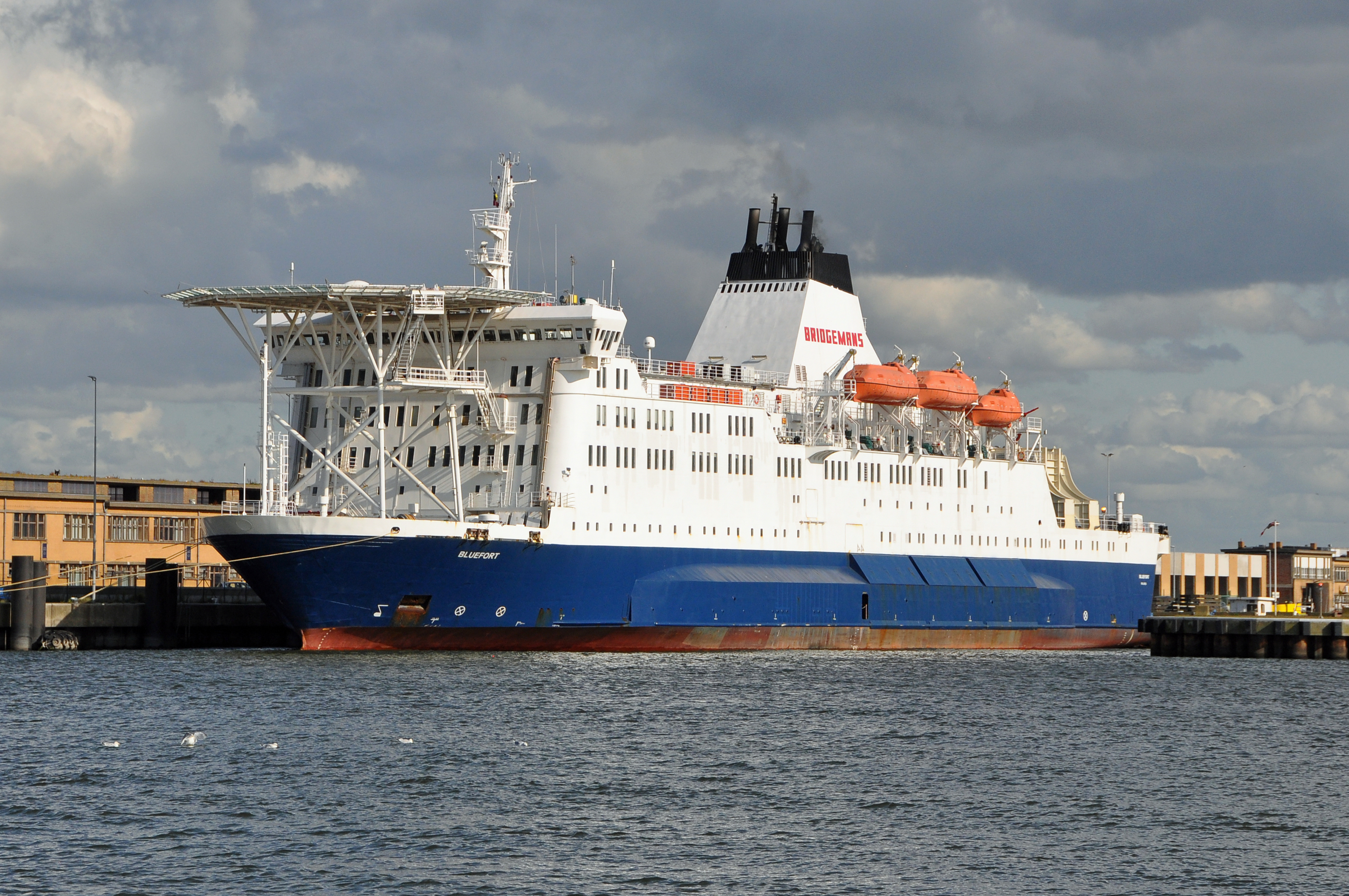
Bluefort at Ostend.

From January to December 2007, the Meloodia was on charter to the Spanish shipping company Baleària on service between the Balearic Islands and Spanish mainland. She operated different routes between Barcelona, Mahón and Palma de Mallorca.

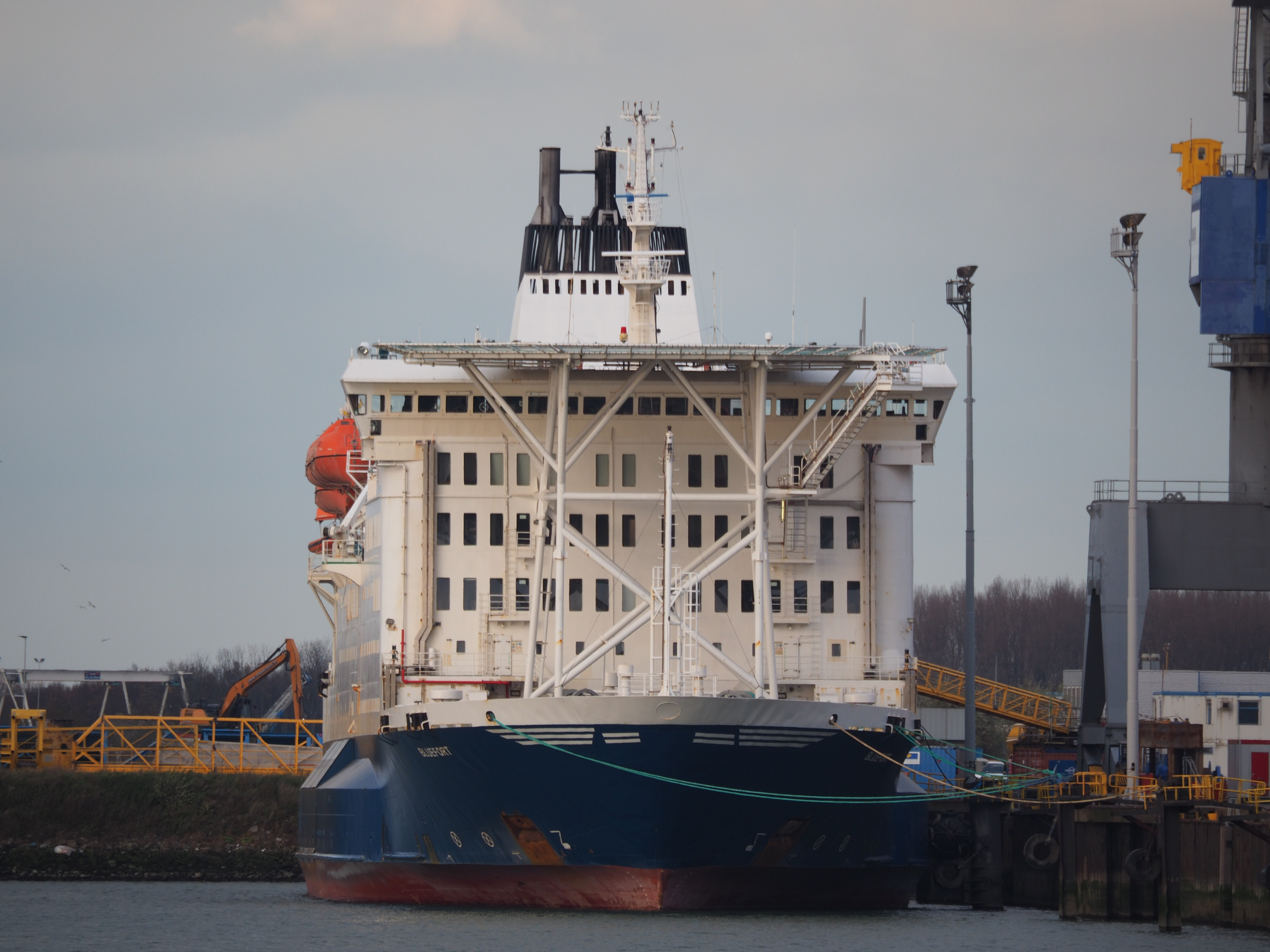
Bluefort at Rotterdam.

In November 2007 Tallink entered a memorandum agreement to sell the Meloodia, with delivery in December 2007. When the ship was delivered on 7 December 2007, the buyer was revealed to be Equinox Offshore Accommodation Ltd, a Singapore-based company controlled by Norwegian interests. Subsequently, the Meloodia was renamed ARV 1. In January 2008 the ARV 1 arrived at SembCorp Marine shipyards, Singapore for conversion into an accommodation and repair vessel, with the planned delivery in the third quarter of 2008. The Bluefort was acquired by Vancouver, BC, Canada-based Bridgemans Services Group LP in 2015.

In December 2017, the Bluefort successfully completed a contract for accommodations and CTV boat landing services in the wind farm industry in Belgium.

=== Retirement and Scrapping ===
In October 2021 MS Bluefort was sailed to Alang, India awaiting dismantlement and scrapping.

== Refits ==
A number of alterations to the original design of the Diana II has been made during the years. Already during her first year of Viking Line service, her decks were heavily polluted by soot from the funnel. The funnel received extended smoke pipes but as the problem persisted, the screen on the rear top of the funnel was removed. After another extension of the smoke pipes, the problem was eventually solved but made the ship's exterior appearance rather odd.

The Diana II's large car deck on deck 4 was during the 1980s deemed to be larger than necessary and of its port side was rebuilt with additional cabins. In preparations of her entry into EstLine service in 1994, the ship received its most extensive modification to date. Apart from the sealing of the bow visor a "duck tail" was added at the stern. Also, the ship's funnel was once again rebuilt to sport a more solid look. The bow remained inaccessible until its complete rebuilding prior to the ships entry into the Tallinn—Helsinki service in 1996.

When sold by Tallink in 2007, the vessel underwent a major reconstruction transforming her to an accommodation and repair vessel. The superstructure at the stern was cut away, leaving way for a crane and a helicopter pad was constructed on top of her bridge front. To increase stability, big side sponsones were also added.

Under ownership of Bridgemans Services Group LP, an extensive refit was completed in 2016.

In October 2021, the ship stranded in Alang, India to be scrapped.
