= Pascal Lota =

2007 ferry

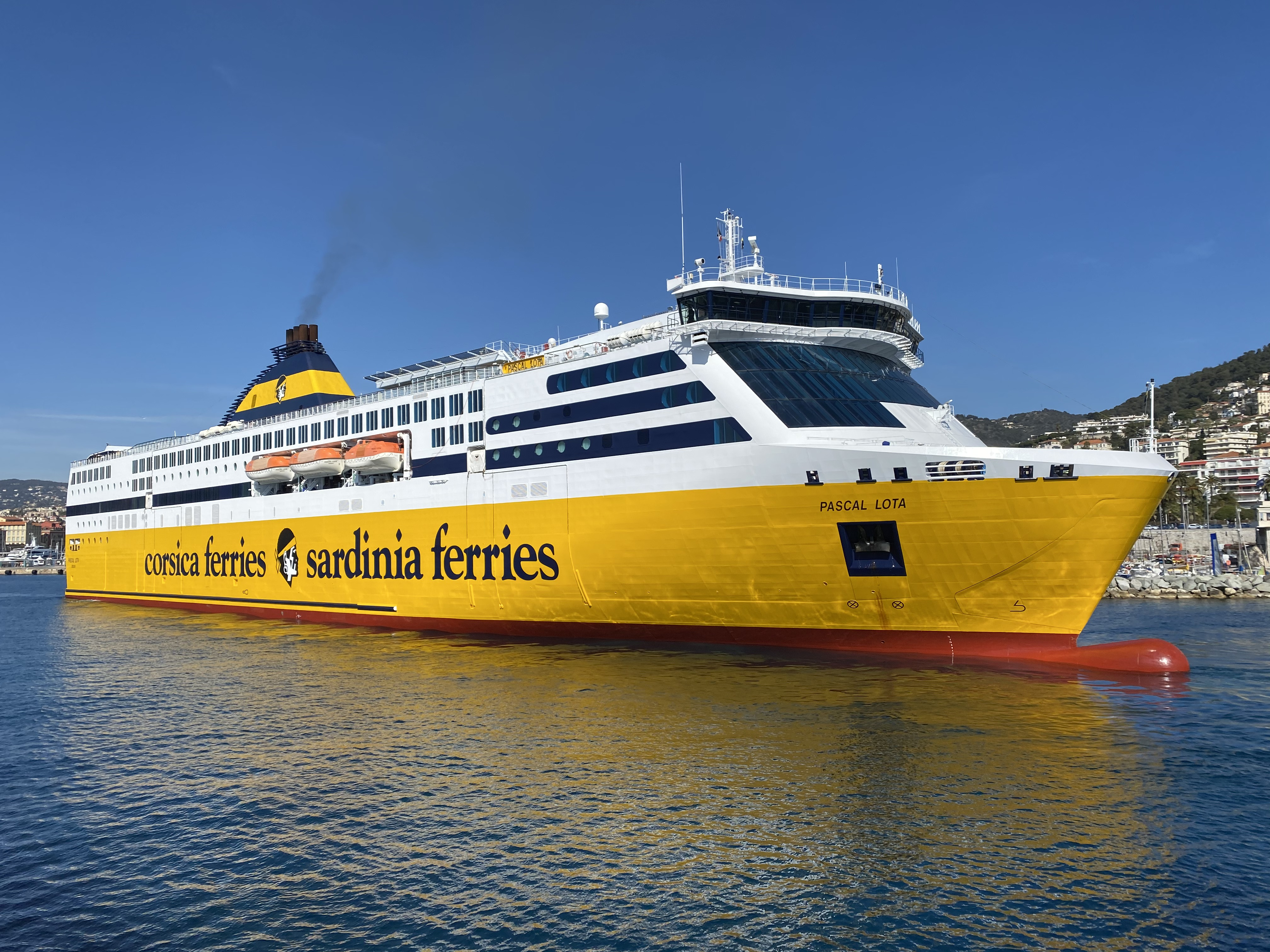
- Pascal Lota arriving at Nice in 2020

History
- Name: Superstar (2008–2017); Pascal Lota (2017–Present)
- Owner: Corsica Ferries
- Operator: Medinvest SpA (Corsica Ferries)
- Port of registry: 2008–2017: Tallinn, Estonia; 2017–2017: Limassol, Cyprus; 2017–Present: Genoa, Italy
- Ordered: 5 August 2005
- Builder: Fincantieri Ancona, Italy
- Cost: €120 million
- Yard number: 6140
- Laid down: 18 January 2007
- Launched: 5 October 2007
- Christened: 5 October 2007 by Kaia Kanepi
- Acquired: 8 April 2008
- In service: 21 April 2008
- Identification: Call sign: 5BDQ2; IMO number: 9365398; MMSI number: 210902000
- Status: In service

General characteristics
- Class & type: Fast cruiseferry
- Tonnage: 36,400 GT; 5,400 DWT
- Length: 175.10 m (574 ft 6 in)
- Beam: 27.60 m (90 ft 7 in)
- Draught: 7.00 m (23 ft)
- Ice class: 1 A Super
- Installed power: Four Wärtsilä diesel engines; 50,400 kW (combined)
- Speed: 27.5 knots (50.9 km/h; 31.6 mph)
- Capacity: 2,080 passengers; 173 berths; 665 cars; 1,930 lanemeters

The Pascal Lota, formerly Superstar, is a fast ferry owned by Corsica Ferries - Sardinia Ferries. She was built in 2008 at the Fincantieri shipyard in Ancona, Italy.

== Concept and construction ==
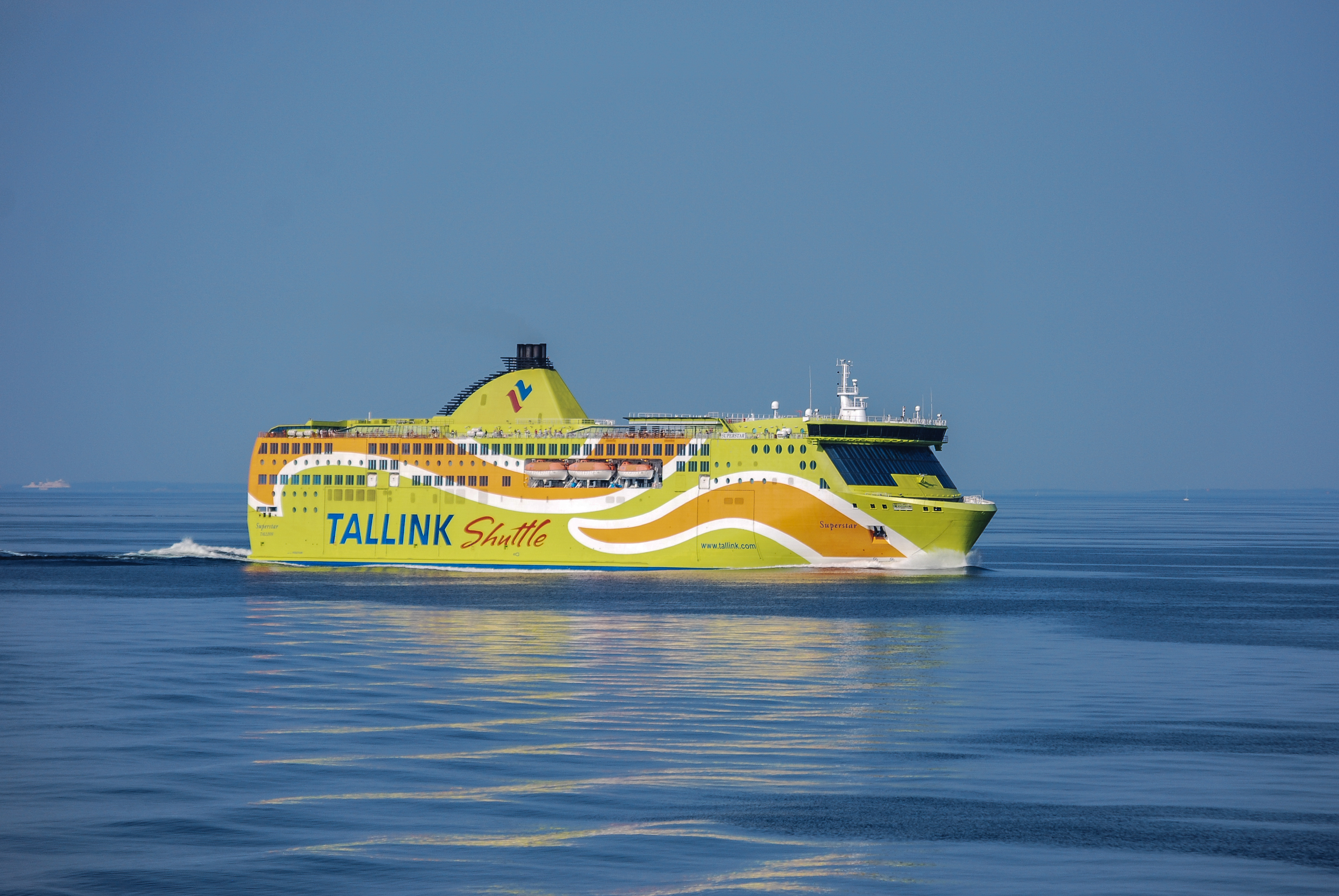
Tallink Shuttle ferry, MS Superstar, arriving at Helsinki, Finland from Tallinn, Estonia

The design of the Superstar is based on Moby Lines' Moby Aki. The original order included an option for a second ship of the same type, which Tallink decided not to exercise.

The keel of the vessel was laid on January 18, 2007. On October 5, 2007, the Superstar was christened by the Estonian tennis player Kaia Kanepi. The ship was delivered on 8 April 2008 and left Ancona for the Baltic Sea a day later.

== Service history ==
Superstar entered service on Tallink's Helsinki–Tallinn route on 21 April 2008. On 30 April 2008 the ship suffered a hydraulics problem while leaving Tallinn, and one Tallinn–Helsinki roundtrip had to be cancelled. On 27 February 2009, while en route from Tallinn to Helsinki with 400 passengers on board, the ship's main engines stopped due to problems with the cooling systems at 8:45 am. The ship was adrift for nearly two hours, with emergency generators providing electricity, until full power could be restored at 10:30 am. Superstar arrived in Helsinki at 11:30, two hours behind schedule.

== Design ==
The green external livery of the ship is according to Tallink promotion material "meant to reflect the environmentally friendly aspects of the ship's design".

The onboard facilities include a three-deck high showlounge, four restaurants, cafeteria, two bars, a casino, a business lounge and various shops.

== Sister ships ==
- Moby Aki
- Moby Wonder
- Finlandia
