= MS Victoria I =

Posidon ship

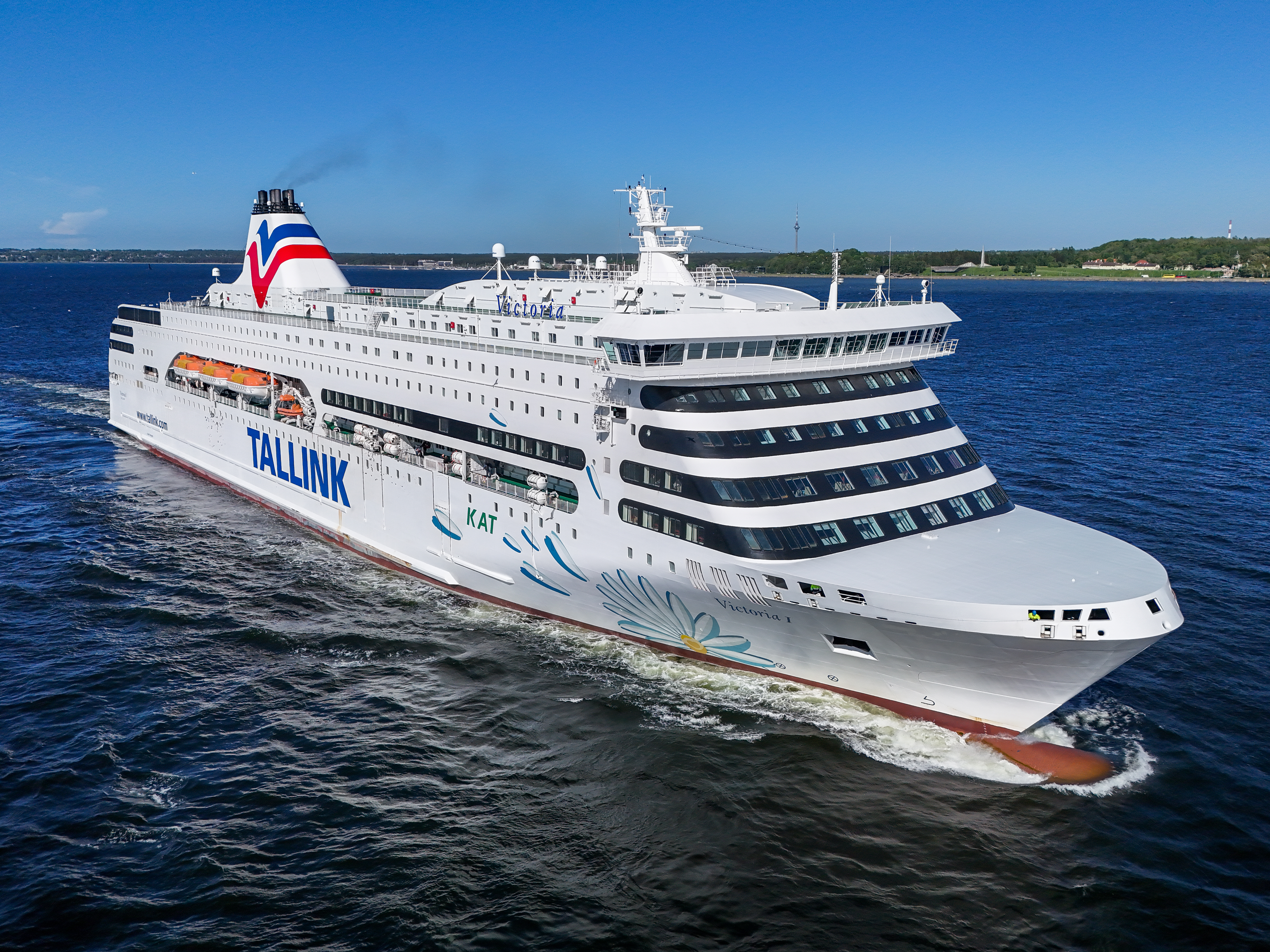
- MS Victoria I arriving to Tallinn

History

Estonia
- Name: Victoria I
- Owner: Tallink
- Operator: Tallink
- Port of registry: Tallinn, Estonia
- Route: Tallinn–Helsinki
- Ordered: 15 October 2002
- Builder: Aker Finnyards, Rauma, Finland
- Yard number: 434
- Laid down: 11 March 2003
- Launched: 16 October 2003
- Acquired: 9 March 2004
- In service: 21 March 2004
- Identification: Call sign: ESRP; IMO number: 9281281; MMSI number: 276519000
- Status: In service

General characteristics
- Class & type: Romantika-class cruiseferry
- Tonnage: 40,975 GT; 4,500 DWT
- Length: 192.9 m (633 ft)
- Beam: 29 m (95 ft)
- Draught: 6.5 m (21 ft)
- Decks: 12
- Ice class: 1 A Super
- Propulsion: 4 × Wärtsilä 16V32; 26,240 kW (combined)
- Speed: 22 knots (41 km/h; 25 mph)
- Capacity: 2,500 passengers; 2,252 passenger beds; 400 cars; 1,000 lanemeters

MS Victoria I is a cruiseferry owned by AS Tallink Grupp. She was built in 2004 by Aker Finnyards, Rauma. The ship operates the Tallinn-Helsinki route.

== History ==
The Victoria I was built in 2004 by Aker Finnyards, Rauma. She was formerly on a route connecting Stockholm, Sweden to Tallinn, Estonia via Mariehamn, Finland. Although the ship's official name is Victoria I, she is often referred to as Victoria, without the number. This is also the name displayed on top of her superstructure, whereas the name is written in full form on the hull.

Between 18 and 20 November 2005, the Victoria I made two one-day cruises from Helsinki to Tallinn, the latter of which was a re-election campaign cruise for the Finnish president Tarja Halonen. The use of an Estonian-flagged ship by the president provoked protests from the Finnish Seamen's Union.

It was chartered by the UK Government to provide temporary accommodation to those fleeing the 2022 Russian invasion of Ukraine. The vessel was docked in the Port of Leith, in Edinburgh, Scotland. The ship, which was chartered until July 2023, had been providing people with accommodation until they secure somewhere to stay longer term. It took in its first Ukrainian residents in July 2022.

On 1 August 2023 Victoria I arrived back in her home port at Tallinn and currently the vessel on service between Tallinn and Helsinki starting from 12 October.

== See also ==
- Largest ferries of Europe
