= Enn Pant =

Estonian entrepreneur (born 1965)

Enn Pant (born in 1965) is an Estonian entrepreneur.

1992–1996 he was the chancellor of Ministry of Finance.

He has been (e.g. in 2014) the major shareholder of Tallink.

In 2011 he was awarded with Order of the White Star, III class.
