= MS Georg Ots =

1979 ferry

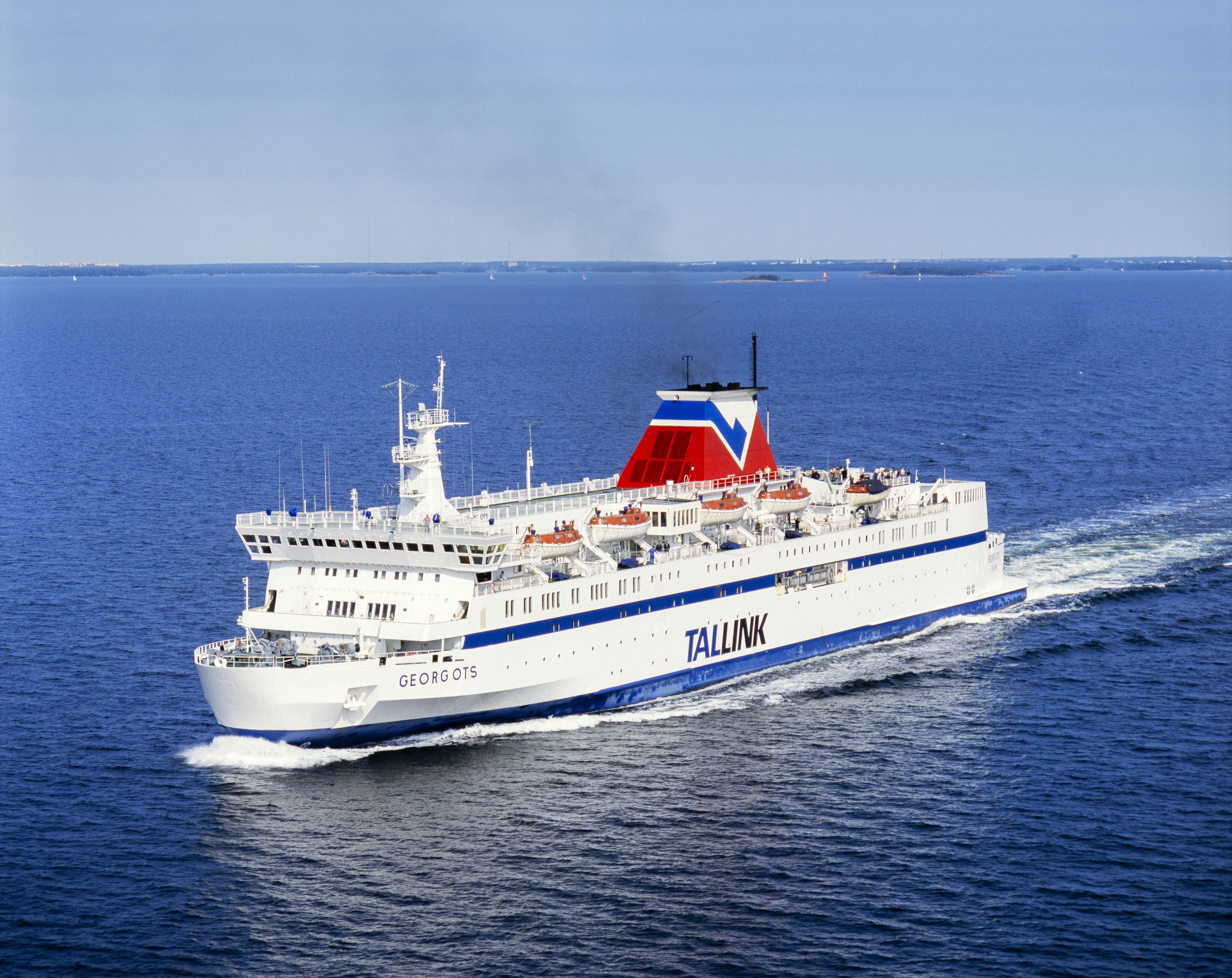
- Georg Ots between Tallinn and Helsinki in 1998.

History
- Name: Georg Ots
- Owner: FGUP Rosmorport → Primorsky Krai
- Port of registry: 1980–1991: Tallinn, Soviet Union; 1991–2002: Tallinn, Estonia; 2002–2011: Saint Petersburg, Russia; 2011–2014: Vladivostok, Russia
- Builder: Stocnia Szczecinska im Adolfa Warskiego, Szczecin, Poland
- Yard number: B 493-1/1
- Laid down: April 23, 1979
- Launched: November 10, 1979
- Completed: 1980
- Acquired: May 25, 1980
- Maiden voyage: 1980
- In service: 1980
- Out of service: 2014
- Identification: Call sign: UDVC; RS number: 790111; IMO number: 7625835; MMSI number: 273446420
- Fate: Scrapped in 2014.

General characteristics
- Type: Passenger/Ro-Ro Cargo Ship
- Tonnage: 12,549 GT; 1,327 t DWT
- Length: 134.0 m (439 ft 8 in)
- Beam: 21.02 m (69 ft 0 in)
- Draught: 5.80 m (19 ft 0 in)
- Installed power: 4 × Sulzer-Zgoda 6 LZ40/48 diesels; combined 12800 kW
- Speed: 18 knots (33.34 km/h; 20.71 mph)
- Capacity: 600 passengers (as built); 392 passengers (as rebuilt 1993)

MS Georg Ots was a cargo/passenger ferry that sailed between Helsinki, Finland, and Tallinn, Estonia, from 1980 to 2000. From 2002 it was used as a cargo/passenger ferry that sailed between Saint Petersburg and Baltiysk in Kaliningrad Oblast. The ship was built for the Estonian Shipping Company. The 12,600-ton ship (length 134 meters, breadth 21 meters, draft 5,7 meters) could carry 1200 passengers, thirteen 13.6 m-long trailers or 107 passenger cars. It was named after the Estonian baritone, Georg Ots. In 2002 she was sold to the St. Petersburg Shipping Company and sailed until 2010. In 2012 the ship was rented to an unnamed company that sailed it to China and illegally sold it to be scrapped.

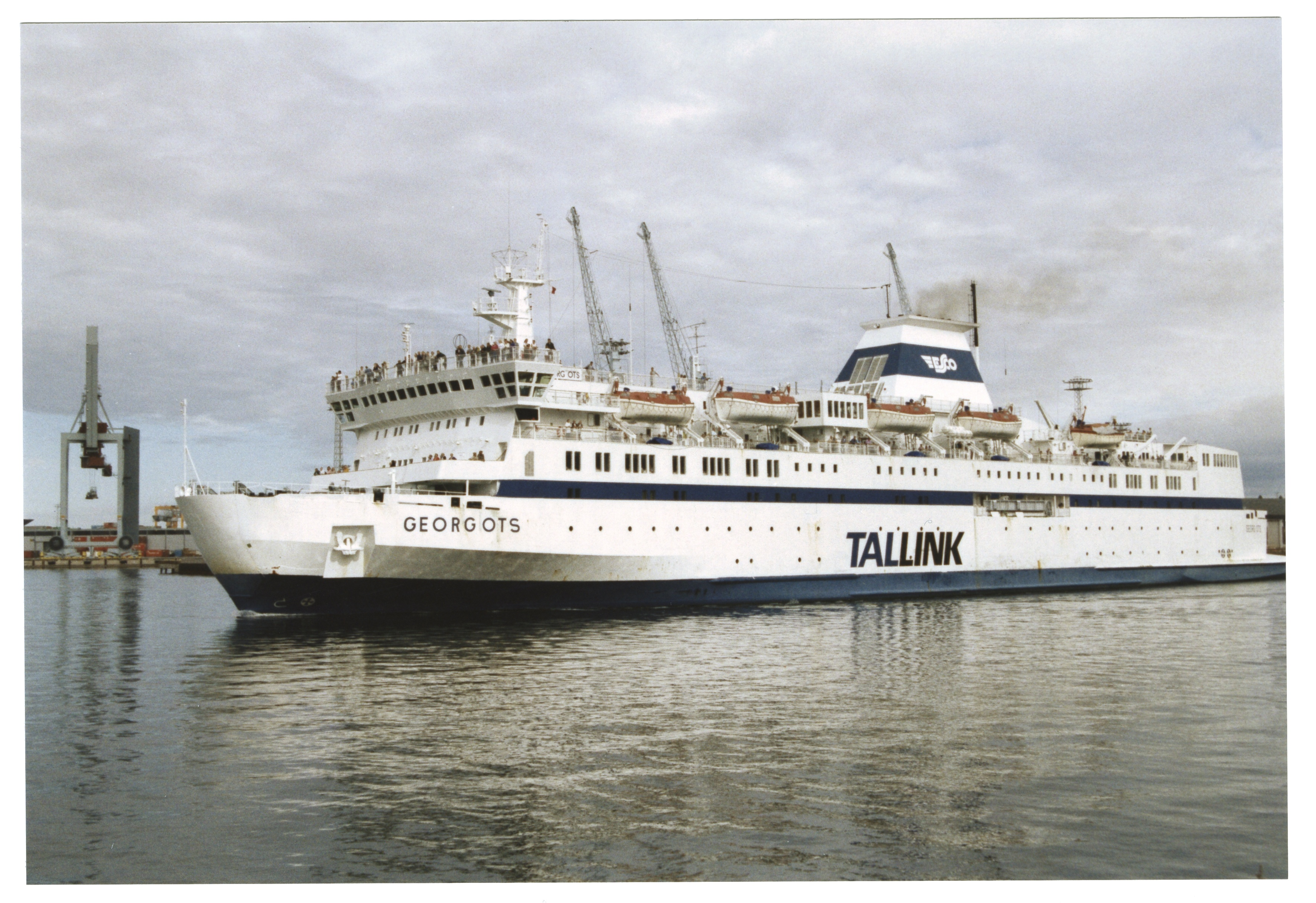
Georg Ots in Tallink livery (1995)

== See also ==
- Dmitriy Shostakovich-class ferry
- Georg Ots (1920–1975), Estonian baritone.
