= Paavo Nõgene =

Estonian civil servant

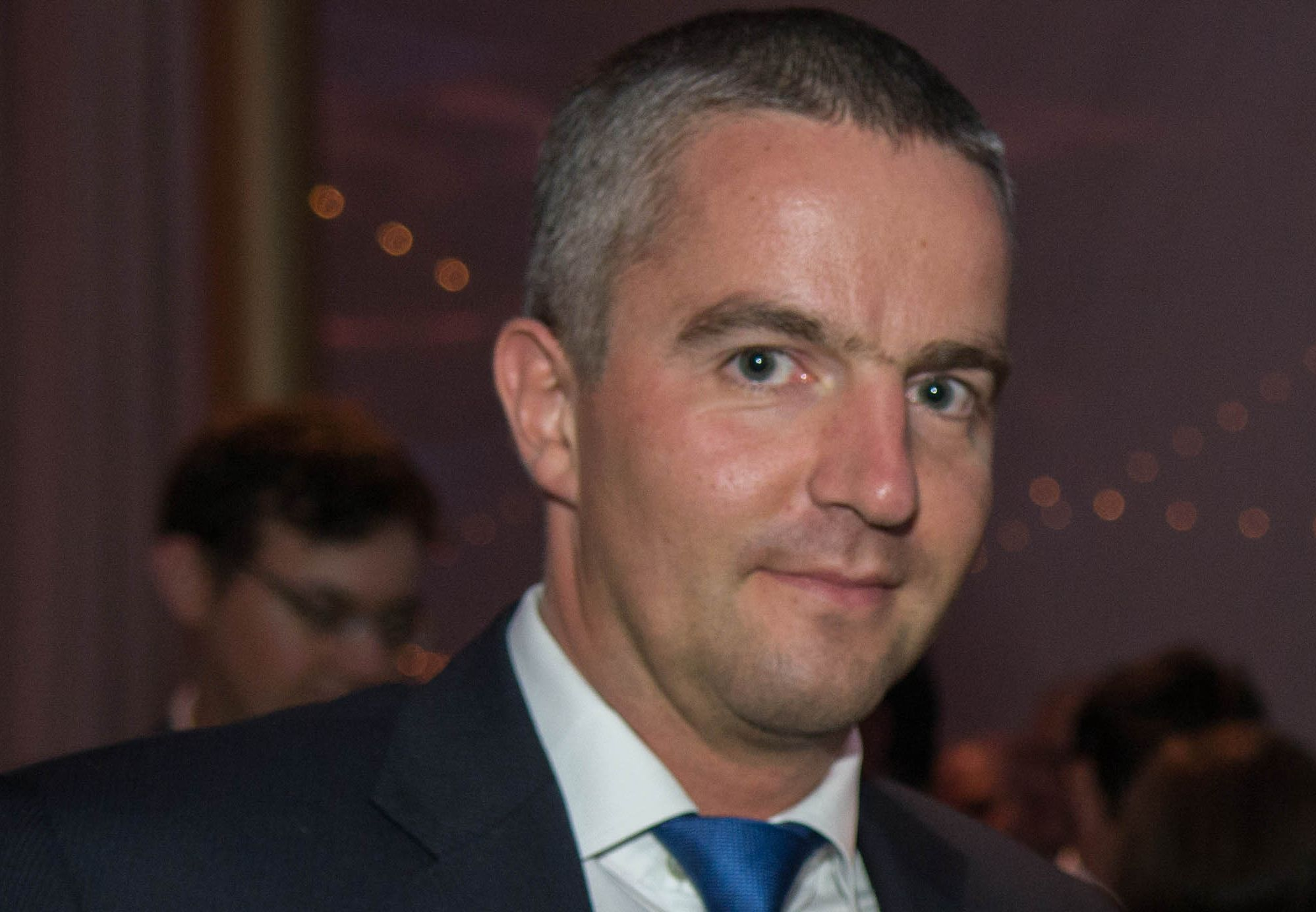
Paavo Nõgene

Paavo Nõgene (born 13 March 1980 in Tartu) is an Estonian producer and government official. He was serving as the Secretary General of the Estonian Ministry of Culture from 2013 through April 2018, when he resigned to pursue his career as the CEO of Tallink Group.

== Education ==
- 1987–1992 Tallinn 21st Secondary School (emphasis on music)
- 1992–1998 Tartu Karlova Secondary School (emphasis on music)
- 2012 – Tartu University (journalism and communication, B.A.)

== Professional career ==
Nõgene began his professional career in 1995 as a lighting assistant at the theatre Vanemuine. From 2007 to 2012, he was serving as the General Manager of Vanemuine.

From 2013, he is serving as the Secretary General of the Estonian Ministry of Culture.

His supervisory board positions include:

- 2012 and 2017 –... Member of the Supervisory Board, Estonian Public Broadcasting
- 2016 –... Chairman of the Supervisory Board, Art Museum of Estonia
- 2013 – April 2018 Chairman of the Supervisory Board, Estonian Concert Organization
- 2013 – April 2018 Chairman of the Supervisory Board, Estonian Film Institute
- 2013 – July 2018 Chairman of the Supervisory Board, Estonian Drama Theatre
- 2013 –... Member of the Supervisory Board, Estonian National Opera
- 2012 –... Chairman of the Supervisory Board, Vanemuine Theatre
- 2013 – April 2018 Member of the Supervisory Board, Gambling Tax Council

In April 2018, Nõgene resigned from the Estonian Ministry of Culture to pursue his career as the CEO of Tallink Group.

== Private enterprise ==
In 2000, he founded the event marketing company PN Management and later PNG OÜ PNG Events. The company has organised sports events, such as the Tallinn International Horse Show, as well as many music and entertainment events (incl. concert tours and large opera and musical performances). The largest among the latter are Puccini’s Tosca (2001) on Tartu's Town Hall Square; Webber's Evita (2002) and Elton John’s Aida at the Tartu Song Festival Grounds (2003); as well as original production performances of Webber's Jesus Christ Superstar (2004) and Ulvaeus and Andersson's Mamma Mia! in the Saku Suurhall (2005). The company had produced the world's largest Andrew Lloyd Webber gala to date in question at the Tallinn Song Festival Grounds (July 2006), and official cooperation partner of Andrew Lloyd Webber's company Really Useful Group Ltd. in Estonia.

Based on its results for 2004, PNG OÜ PNG Events was named as one of the two most successful event marketing companies in the Äripäev newspaper's Marketing Top 100. Shares in PNG OÜ PNG Events were sold in 2006, in order to focus on theatrical work. Paavo Nõgene continues to own PN Management OÜ, which is currently focused on investment activities.
