= Tallink =

Estonian shipping company

AS Tallink Grupp
- Type: Public
- Traded as: Nasdaq Baltic: TAL1T
- Industry: transportation
- Founded: 1989
- Headquarters: Tallinn, Estonia
- Area served: Northern Europe
- Key people: Enn Pant, Paavo Nõgene
- Products: Ferries, port services, passenger transportation, freight transportation, holidays, business travel
- Revenue: ▼949.1 million euros (2019)
- Net income: ▼49.7 million euros (2019)
- Number of employees: 7,270 (2019)
- Subsidiaries: Silja Line
- Website: www.tallink.com www.tallinksilja.com

Tallink (Estonian pronunciation: [ˈtɑlʲˑiŋk]) is an Estonian shipping company operating Baltic Sea cruiseferries and ropax ships from Estonia to Finland, Estonia to Sweden and Finland to Sweden. It is the largest passenger and cargo shipping company in the Baltic Sea region. It owns Silja Line and a part of SeaRail. Tallink Hotels runs four hotels in Tallinn and Riga.

It is a publicly traded company, that is listed in Tallinn Stock Exchange. A major shareholder is an investment company AS Infortar, that also has ownership in several Tallink subsidiaries and a natural gas company Elenger.

== History ==
=== Background ===
The history of the company known today as Tallink can be traced back to 1965, when the Soviet Union-based Estonian Shipping Company (ESCO) introduced passenger ferry services between Helsinki and Tallinn on MS Vanemuine. Regular around-the-year passenger ferry services began in 1968, on MS Tallinn, which served the route until it was replaced by the new MS Georg Ots in 1980.

=== 1989–1992 ===
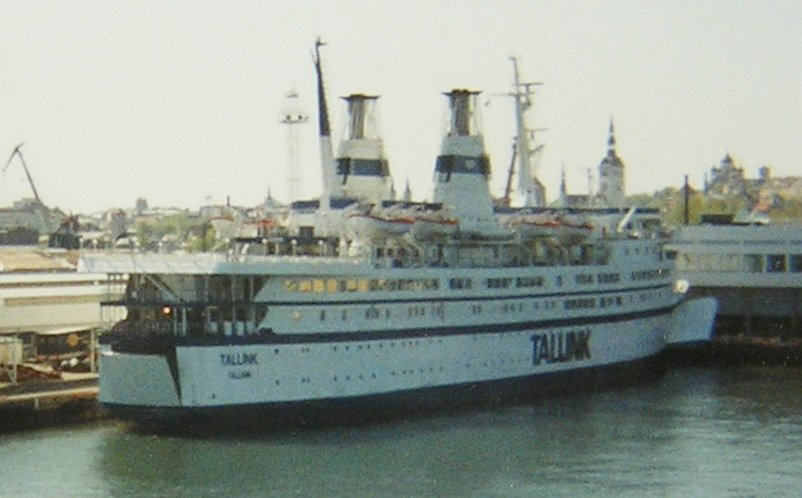
The original MS Tallink in Tallinn Harbour, 1994

In May 1989, ESCO formed a new subsidiary, joint venture (Estonian: ühisettevõte) Tallink, together with the Finnish Palkkiyhtymä Oy. In December of the same year, ESCO and Palkkiyhtymä purchased MS Scandinavian Sky from SeaEscape, and the ship began servicing the Helsinki–Tallinn route on 8 January 1990 as MS Tallink. During her first year in service the Tallink carried 166,000 passengers. Later in the same year the freighter MS Transestonia joined the Tallink on the Helsinki–Tallinn route and Tallink was established as the name of the company as well as the main ship. At the same time ESCO still operated the Georg Ots in the same route, essentially competing with its own daughter company. This conflict was resolved in September 1991, when the Georg Ots was chartered to Tallink. In the early 1990s, passenger numbers on Helsinki–Tallinn traffic were steadily increasing, and during winters between 1992 and 1995, Tallink chartered MS Saint Patrick II from Irish Ferries to increase capacity on the route.

=== 1993–2000 ===
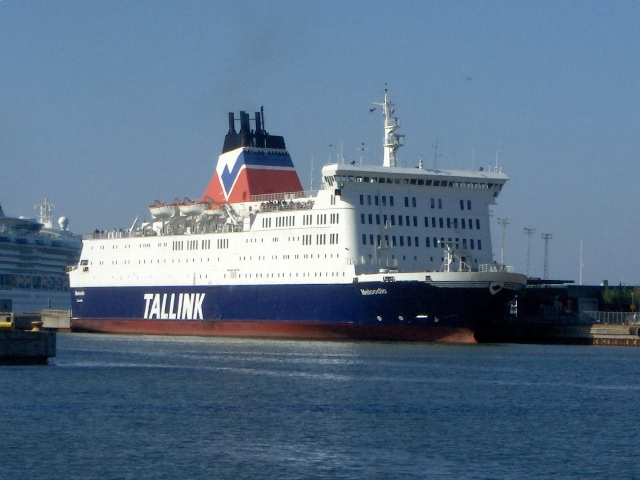
MS Meloodia, introduced a blue hull colour to the Tallink fleet.

Tallink became a fully Estonian-owned company in 1993, when Palkkiyhtymä sold its shares of both the Tallink company and MS Tallink to ESCO. At this time, other companies were establishing themselves on the lucrative Helsinki–Tallinn traffic, including the Estonian New Line, owned by the Tallinn-based Inreko. ESCO and Inreko saw no sense in competing with each other and in January 1994, Tallink and Inreko Laeva AS were merged into AS Eminre. Tallink remained the marketing name for the company's fleet. Later in the same year Inreko purchased MS Nord Estonia from EstLine (a daughter company of ESCO and the Swedish Nordström & Thulin), renamed her MS Vana Tallinn and placed her in Helsinki–Tallinn traffic for Tallink. Inreko also brought with them two fast hydrofoils, HS Liisa and HS Laura which began serving under the Tallink Express brand. In 1994, Tallink also attempted traffic from Estonia to Germany for the first time, with two chartered ferries MS Balanga Queen and MS Ambassador II that were placed on the route Helsinki–Tallinn–Travemünde.

In September 1994, AS Eminre's operations were divided into two companies, one that took care of the traffic to Germany (which was soon closed down) and AS Hansatee which took the Helsinki–Tallinn traffic and the Tallink name. ESCO was the dominant partner in Hansatee, controlling 45% of the shares, whereas Inreko owned only 12.75% (the remaining 42.25% belonging to Eesti Ühispank, Estonia). In 1995, Hansatee brought the first large ferry into Helsinki–Tallinn traffic when they chartered MS Mare Balticum from EstLine and renamed her MS Meloodia. Following various disputes between ESCO and Inreko (most notably about the charter price of Vana Tallinn), Inreko sold their shares of AS Hansatee to ESCO in December 1996. At the same time Inreko sold the Tallink Express hydrofoils to Linda Line, Estonia, and begun operating the Vana Tallinn on Helsinki–Tallinn traffic under the name TH Ferries.

In 1997, a second large ferry was brought to Tallink's traffic when the company chartered MS Normandy from Stena Line. To replace the lost hydrofoils, Hansatee purchased a new express catamaran in May 1997, which was named MS Tallink Express I. At this time it was clear that two large ferries were needed for traffic between Helsinki and Tallinn, and when the Normandy's charter ended in December 1997, Tallink purchased MS Lion King from Stena Line, which entered traffic in February 1998 as MS Fantaasia. In July of the same year, Tallink purchased the freighter MS Kapella which opened a line from Paldiski to Kapellskär, Tallink's first route to Sweden. In October, the original MS Tallink, which no longer conformed modern safety regulations, was sold. Two months later Hansatee purchased their first fast ferry capable of carrying cars, HSC Tallink AutoExpress.

=== 2000–2006 ===
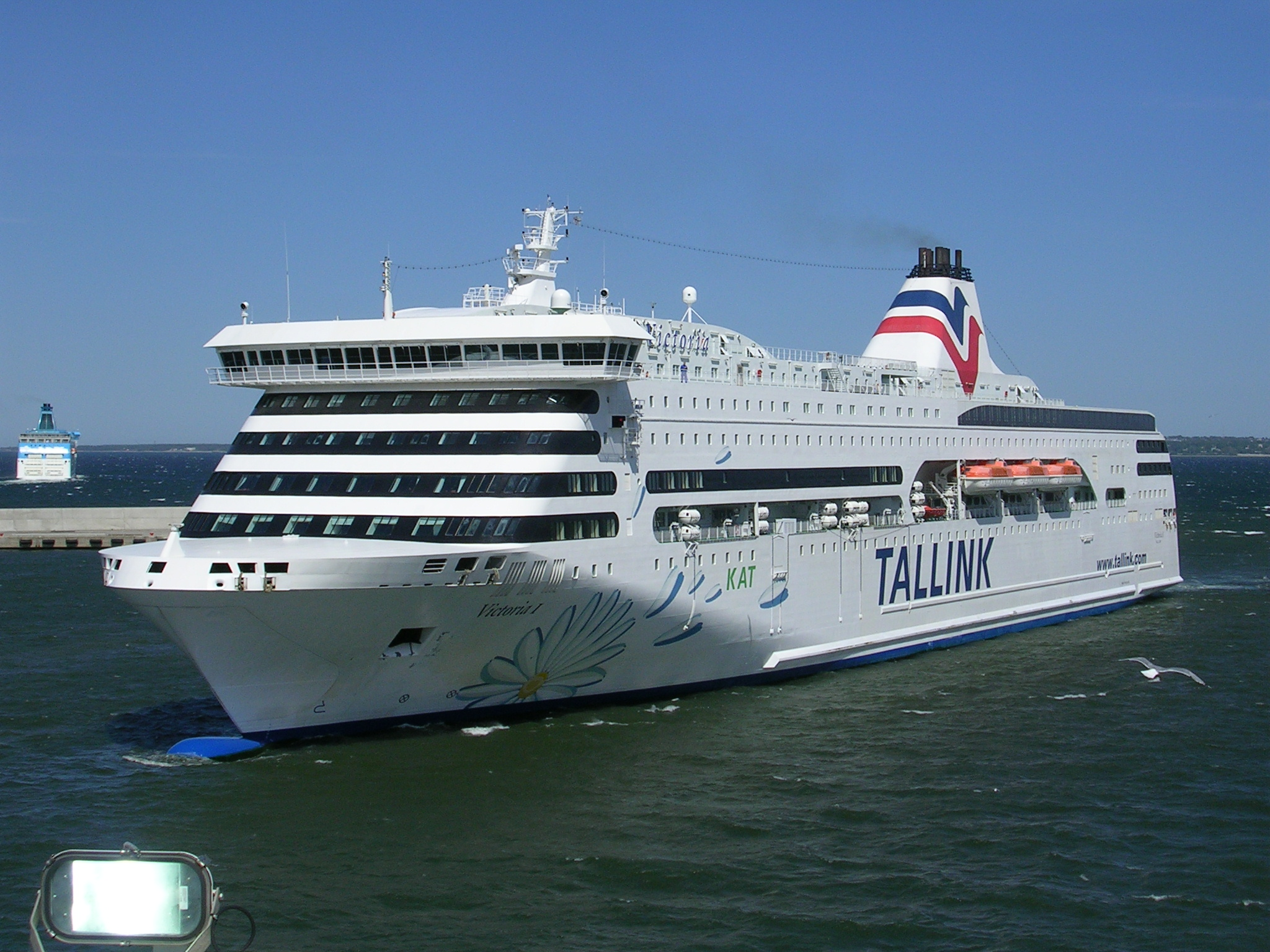
The sister ships Romantika and Victoria I (pictured) were Tallink's first new builds, delivered in 2002 and 2004, respectively.

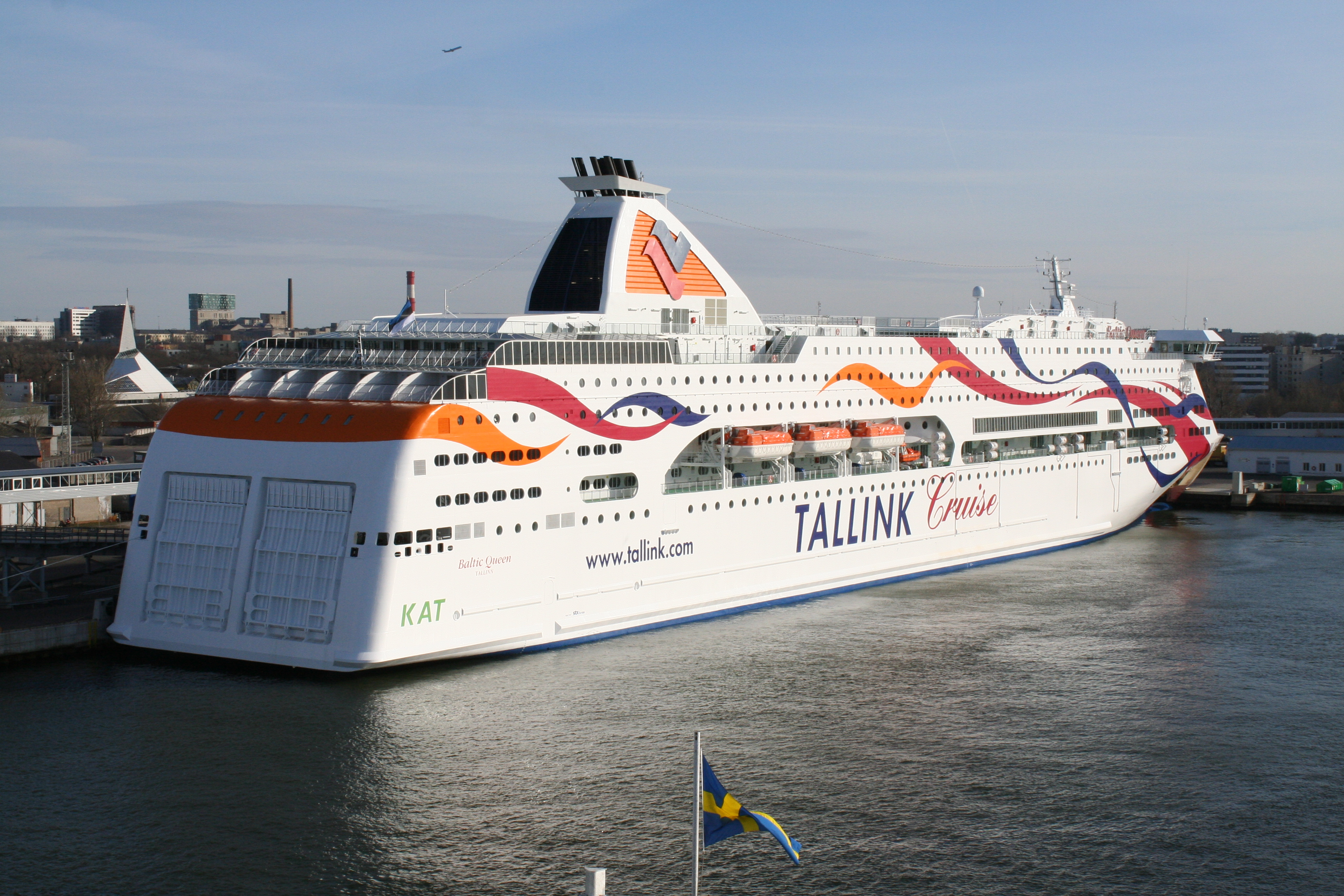
Baltic Queen in dock in Tallinn

By the year 2000, ESCO had become the sole owner of EstLine, and in December 2000, EstLine's two ferries Regina Baltica and Baltic Kristina were chartered to Hansatee, and the line between Tallinn and Stockholm began to be marketed as a part of Tallink. A few months earlier, in August 2000, Hansatee had ordered their first newbuild the 2,500-passenger cruiseferry Romantika from the Finnish Aker Finnyards. This was the first ship in a new building programme that between 2001 and 2010, cost €1.2 billion. In June 2001, Tallink purchased Tallink AutoExpress 2, while next month, EstLine was declared bankrupt.

In 2002, AS Hansatee changed its name to AS Tallink Grupp, and in May of the same year, the company took delivery of the Romantika, which was placed on Helsinki–Tallinn traffic. In November of the same year, the classic Georg Ots was sold to the government of Russia. In 2004, three new ships joined Tallink's fleet, Tallink AutoExpress 3 and Tallink AutoExpress 4 alongside the Romantika's sister MS Victoria I which was placed on Tallinn–Stockholm route, replacing MS Fantaasia which in turn started a new route from Helsinki to St. Petersburg via Tallinn. This route proved unprofitable and was terminated in January 2005. Later in 2005, Tallink ordered a sister ship of the to-be-delivered MS Galaxy and a fast ropax ferry from Aker Finnyards as well as another ropax ferry from the Fincantieri yard in Italy. On December 9, 2005, Tallink was listed at Tallinn Stock Exchange.

=== 2006–present ===
In 2006, Tallink purchased the Baltic Sea operations of Superfast Ferries from Attica Group, opened a route between Riga and Stockholm (with MS Fantaasia, which was within a month replaced by MS Regina Baltica), took delivery of the new MS Galaxy which replaced Romantika on the Tallinn–Helsinki route, transferred Romantika to the Tallinn–Stockholm route, and withdrew AutoExpress from service. A few months later, the company purchased the rival Finnish passenger line Silja Line from Sea Containers. The purchase of Superfast and Silja cost €780 million. In October 2006, the company expressed an interest in making an offer to operate ferries on the state-subsidized routes between the Swedish island of Gotland and the Swedish mainland between 2009 and 2015.

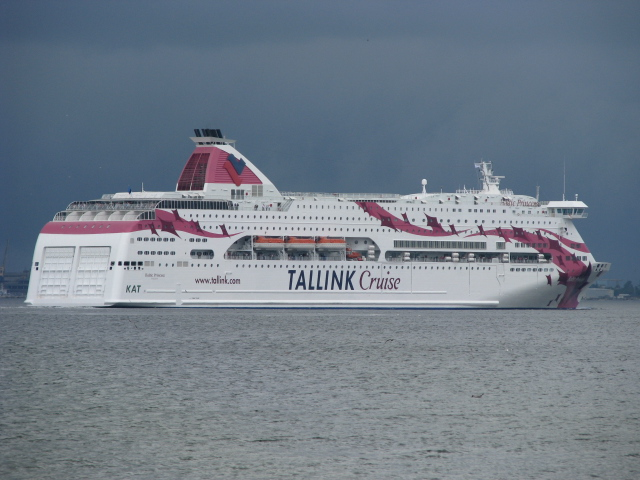
Baltic Princess, the second Galaxy-class ship, was delivered to Tallink in 2008. The Galaxy-class ships are in essence lengthened versions of Romantika and Victoria I.

From the beginning of 2007, the former Superfast ships were moved under the Tallink brand and their route changed to Tallinn–Helsinki–Rostock. In April of the same year, Aker Yards delivered the fast cruiseferry MS Star that had been ordered in 2005. With the delivery of the Star, Meloodia was chartered to Balearic Islands, Spain for ten months and later sold, while AutoExpress 3 and AutoExpress 4 were also withdrawn. During April 2007, Tallink also ordered a third Galaxy-class cruiseferry from Aker Yards.

Two new ships followed in 2008, with the fast cruiseferry MS Superstar delivered from Fincantieri and the second Galaxy-class ship, MS Baltic Princess, delivered from Aker Yards. Both ships were placed in service between Helsinki and Tallinn With the delivery of the former, the last AutoExpress fast craft, AutoExpress 2, was withdrawn from Helsinki–Tallinn service. Baltic Princess, meanwhile, replaced her sister ship Galaxy, which was transferred to the fleet of Silja Line. With the arrival of Galaxy MS Silja Festival was left without employment in the Silja fleet, and she was in turn transferred to Tallink's fleet, joining Regina Baltica on the Riga–Stockholm service. In November 2008, MS Superfast IX, one of three ships purchased from Superfast Ferries in 2006, was chartered to the Canadian Marine Atlantic ferry operator for five years. In April 2009, Tallink took delivery of its last newbuilding (as of 2010), when MS Baltic Queen was delivered STX Europe (the former Aker Yards). The new ship was placed on the Tallinn–Mariehamn–Stockholm service alongside Victoria I. Romantika, that had been Victoria I's running mate since 2006, was in turn transferred to the Riga–Stockholm route, where she replaced Regina Baltica that was in turn chartered out to Acciona Trasmediterránea.

In December 2009, it was reported that the company was struggling to repay its debts of €1.1 billion. The fiscal year ending in August resulted in an operating loss, and the company had to re-negotiate with its 15 funding banks debt repayment schedules for the years 2009–2011. The banks took a more controlling role in the company: it could no longer pay dividends, make investments, or sign new contracts without its creditors' approval. Tallink also had to pick up the pace in debt repayments if conditions were to improve, and had to look for options to sell or rent some of its ships. Most of its debts were incurred for purchasing Silja Line for €470 million and Superfast Ferries for €310 million.

In November 2009, due to the competitive pressure of larger rivals and higher fuel prices Tallink temporarily withdrew MS Superfast VII and MS Superfast VIII from the Germany–Finland service. The ships spent the winter of 2009–2010 laid up in Kopli, before re-commencing service between Helsinki and Rostock in April 2010.

In March 2011, it was confirmed that the MS Superfast VIII and MS Superfast VII have been chartered to Stena Line for a period of three years, with the option to extend the charter for another year. Stena Line will use these ships for Scotland–Northern Ireland service. The vessels will be delivered after the end of the high season in August 2011. Until then they are operated on their current route by Tallink. The prospective charter will improve the result of these vessels so that they will be generating a profit.

In February 2015, the company signed a building contract for the construction of its first liquefied natural gas-fueled ship, the MS Megastar which began from January 2017, providing a six-times-a-day Tallinn–Helsinki–Tallinn service.

In 2018, during the course of over 10,000 voyages the company carried 9.756 million passengers, 1.25 million vehicles and 384,958 cargo units.

In 2019, the company carried 9.763 million passengers and 385,000 cargo units.

In 2019, Tallink reached a franchise agreement with a global fast-food company, Burger King to open restaurants in Estonia, Latvia, and Lithuania, and according to the agreement, Tallink will have exclusive rights for running Burger King eateries in the Baltic states for 20 years. The company plans to open the first restaurant in each Baltic state in the first half of 2020. The enlargement of Burger King will employ around 800 people in Estonia, Latvia, and Lithuania.

In late 2018 Tallink ordered its second liquefied natural gas-fueled ship the MS MyStar, it was supposed to be completed by the end of 2019, but was delayed due to the COVID-19 pandemic.

In December 2020, Tallink made its last trip from Riga, the capital of Latvia. It was sailed by the ship MS Victoria I from Riga to Stockholm.

In April 2022, relations with Tallink ships will cease to operate in Latvia.

On December 10, 2022, the new MS Mystar arrived in Tallinn and started Tallinn-Helsinki route on December 13, eventually replacing MS Star which was chartered for 20 months to Irish Ferries and renamed to MS Oscar Wilde.

== Controversies ==
=== Ignored man overboard ===
In April 2006, Tallink's ferry MS Regina Baltica, en route from Tallinn to Stockholm, ignored when multiple passengers reported that a passenger had fallen overboard. The crew refused to stop the ship to search for the passenger and the 21-year-old Estonian male perished in the incident. Tallink later accepted no responsibility for the accident, emphasizing that none of the passengers confirmed actually seeing the man falling overboard or in the water.

== Fleet ==
=== Current fleet ===
Ship	Type	Built	Entered service	Gross tonnage	Passengers (max)	Knots	Route	Flag and home port	Image
MS MyStar	Cruiseferry	2022	2022–	50,629 GT	2.800	27	Tallinn – Helsinki	Tallinn, Estonia	
MS Megastar	Cruiseferry	2017	2017–	49,134 GT	2.800	27	Tallinn – Helsinki	Tallinn, Estonia	
MS Baltic Queen	Cruiseferry	2009	2009–	48,915 GT	2.800	24,5	Tallinn – Mariehamn – Stockholm	Tallinn, Estonia	
MS Victoria I	Cruiseferry	2004	2004–	40,975 GT	2.500	22	Tallinn – Helsinki	Tallinn, Estonia	
MS Romantika	Cruiseferry	2002	2002–	40,803 GT	2.500	22	Laid off in Paljassaare	Riga, Latvia	

=== On charter ===
Ship	Type	Built	Gross tonnage	Passengers (max)	Knots	Route	Flag and home port	Notes	Image
MS Silja Europa	Cruiseferry	1993	59,912 GT	3.013	21,5		Tallinn, Estonia	Transferred from Silja Line. Since 2022 September, the ship accommodates migrants from Africa and Asia in Rotterdam, Netherlands, from September 2022, the vessel is providing accommodation services, until 31 January 2026, with an option to further extend the contract for two additional six-month periods.	
MS Galaxy 1	Cruiseferry	2006	48,915 GT	2.800	22		Riga, Latvia	Transferred from Silja Line. Since 2022 September, the ship accommodates migrants from Africa and Asia in Amsterdam, Netherlands, from September 2022 to October 2025. Charter ends 04/2027	
MV Superfast IX	Fast Ro-pax	2002	30,285 GT	962	28,9	Cork, Ireland to Boulogne-sur-Mer, France	Limassol, Cyprus	From May 1, 2026 Chartered to Hibernia Line for 36 months with an option to extend the charter by two additional 12-month periods and a purchase option for the charterer.	

=== Former vessels ===
Ships that are still in use are marked in green.

Ship	Built	In service	Tonnage^{1}	Image	Notes
MS Tallink	1972	1989–1996	8,020 GRT; 10,341 GT		Scrapped in Alang, India, 2005.
MS Transestonia	1972	1990–2000	2,386 GRT		Scrapped in Alang, India, 2006.
MS Saint Patrick II	1973	1992–1995	7,984 GRT		Scrapped in Alang, India, 2023.
MS Georg Ots	1980	1993–2000	12,549 GRT		Scrapped in China in 2014.
HS Laura	1993	1993–1997	298 GRT		Scrapped in Cape Verde in 2014.
MS Corbiere	1970	1994; 1998	4,238 GRT		Since 2000 MS Apollo, owned by Labrador Marine. Scrapped in Aliağa, Turkey, 2021.
MS Ulstein Surfer	1984	1994	299 GRT		In 2005, crashed in Banjul, Gambia.
MS Balanga Queen	1968	1994	10,448 GRT		Since 1994 MS Discovery Sun for Discovery Cruise Line. Scrapped in Chittagong, Bangladesh, 2012.
MS Ambassador II	1970	1994	7,993 GRT		Sailed 1999-2010 for Sterling Casino Lines - Scrapped in New Orleans in 2011.
MS Meloodia	1979	1996–2006	17,955 GT		Since 2007 MS ARV 1 Equinox Offshore Accommodation. Scrapped in Alang, India, 2021.
MS Tallink Express I	1989	1997–2001	430 GT		Since 2001, it has been sailing in Greece under the name SPEED CAT 1. But since 2016, she has not sailed anymore. Laid up in Paloukia. Possibly scrapped.
MS Normandy	1981	1997	17,043 GT		Scrapped in Alang, India, 2012.
MS Fantaasia	1979	1997–2006	10,604 GT		Since 2017 MS Rigel III for Ventouris Ferries between Italy and Albania.
MS Kapella	1974	1997–2012	7,564 GT		Scrapped in Aliağa, Turkey, 2021.
HSC Tallink Autoexpress	1996	1999–2006	5,308 GT		Since 2023 HSC Nissos owned by SAOS Ferries in Greece. She has not sailed anymore since 2024. Laid up in Piraeus in Greece.
Baltic Kristina	1973	2001–2002	12,281 GRT		Scrapped in Alang, India, 2021.
Tallink AutoExpress 2	1997	2001–2007	5,307 GT		From 2007 chartered to Conferry and was later sold to them. She hasn't been sailing since 2018 because she partially sunk due to a lack of proper maintenance.
Tallink Autoexpress 3	1997	2004–2007	3,971 GT		Since 2026 HSC Fertiti for Seajets. Laid up in Agios Konstantinos.
HSC Tallink Autoexpress 4	1996	2004–2007	3,971 GT		Since 2016, she has been sailing on the route through Venezuela under the name PARAGUANA I.
MS Vana Tallinn	1974	1994–2011	10,002 GT		In 2011 sold to Allferries SA. Scrapped in Aliağa, Turkey in 2014.
Baltic Princess	2008	2008–2013	48,915 GT		Since 2013 sailing for Silja Line.
MS Silja Festival	1986	2008–2013	34,414 GT		After being replaced by MS Isabelle on the Stockholm-Riga route in May 2013 she was chartered as an accommodation ship to Kitimat, British Columbia She was then sold in early 2015 to Corsica Ferries and changed name to Mega Andrea.
MS Mistral	1999	2013	7,438 GT		Chartered from Godby Shipping for one year on route Turku-Stockholm.
Regina Baltica	1980	2001–2009	18,345 GT		Since 2017, it has been sailing with the flag of Cyprus on the route from Spain to Algeria.
Superfast VII	2001	2006–2017	30,285 GT		Sold to Stena Line sailing under British flag on the route Belfast - Cairnryan with name Ms Stena Superfast VII.
Superfast VIII	2001	2006–2017	30,285 GT		Sold to Stena Line sailing under British flag on the route Belfast - Cairnryan with name Ms Stena Superfast VIII.
MS Superstar	2008	2008–2017	36,400 GT		Sold to Corsica Ferries Group. New name Pascal Lota under Italian flag.
MS Sea Wind	1972	2008–2022	15,879 GT		Sold to Inok IV, Monte Carlo, Monaco. Since 2022, sailing under the Cameroonian flag with the name A Wind on the route from Russia to Turkey.
MS Isabelle	1989	2013–2024	35,134 GT		Sold to Notamare Shipping Company in Canada. New name Isabelle X under Canada flag. Accommodation platform in Vancouver.
MS Star I	2007	2007–2025	36,249 GT		Sold to Irish Ferries. New name James Joyce under Cyprus flag.
MS Regal Star	2000	2003–2025	15,412 GT		Sold to Ams Line Shipping Co. New name Med Express under the flag of San Marino.
MS Sailor	1987	2020-2025	20,783		Sold to Rederiaktiebolaget Eckerö.

== Terminals ==
Tallink has six terminals, of which two are in Estonia, two in Sweden and two in Finland.

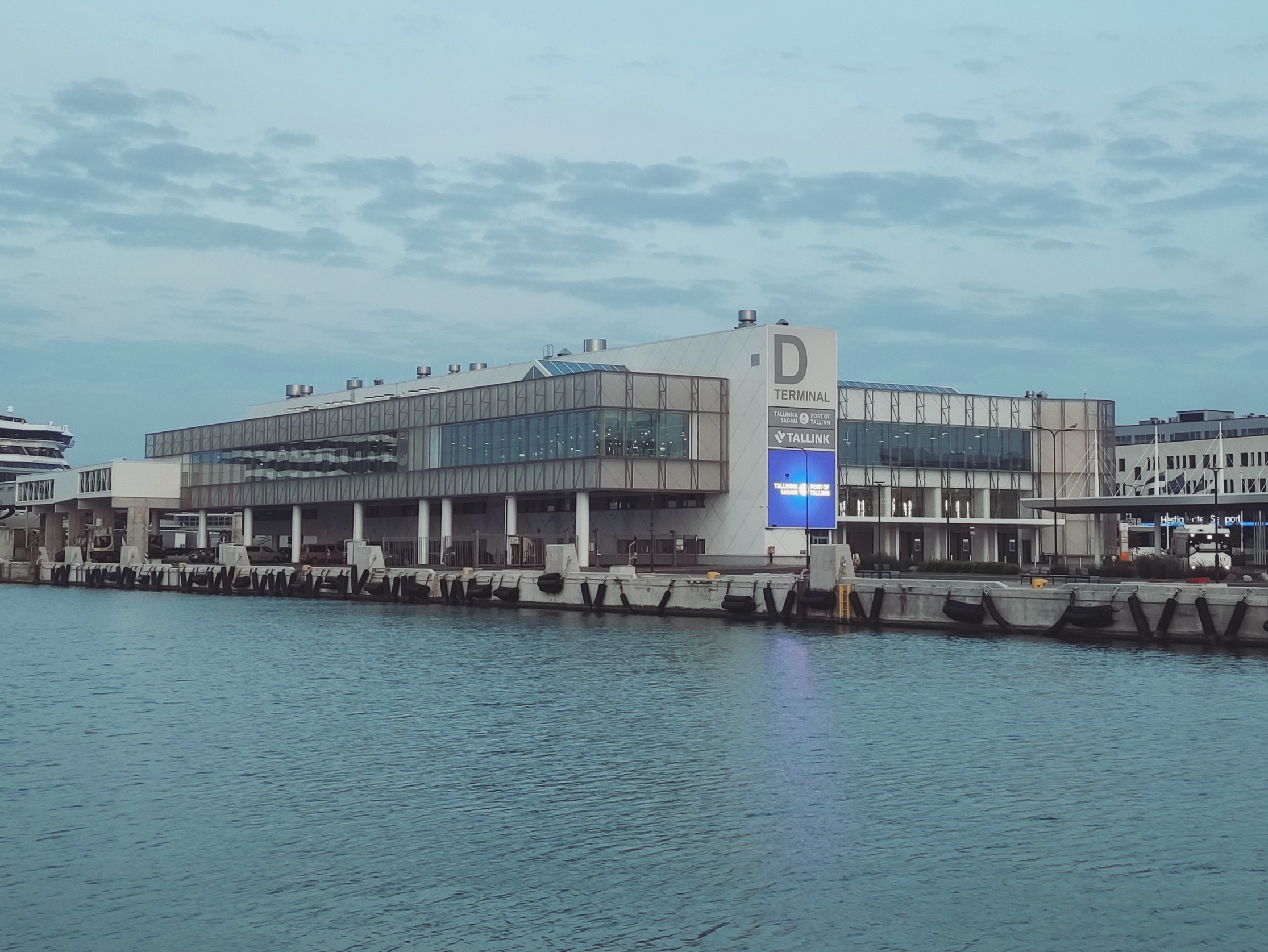
Tallink terminal in Tallinn, Estonia

Estonia

- Tallinn: D-terminal. Served by Tallinn bus lines 19, 25 and 66

Finland

- Helsinki: West Harbour. Served by Helsinki tram lines 7 and 9.
- Mariehamn: Västra Hamnen. Served by the Mariehamn city bus.

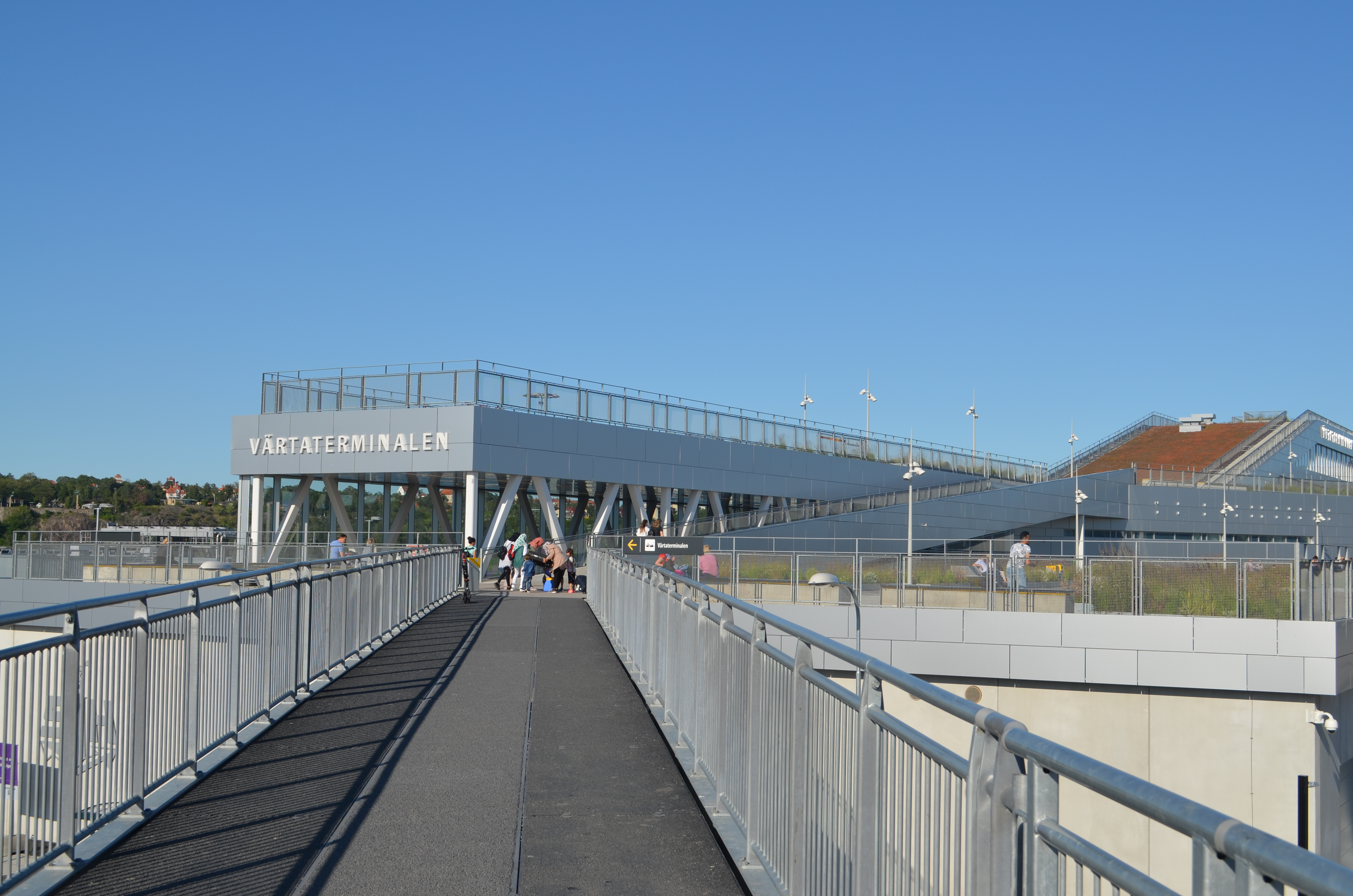
Tallink terminal in Stockholm, Sweden

Sweden

- Stockholm: Värtahamnen.

== See also ==
- Kihnu Veeteed – Estonian ferry company
- TS Laevad – Estonian ferry company
