= MS Med Express =

1993 ferry

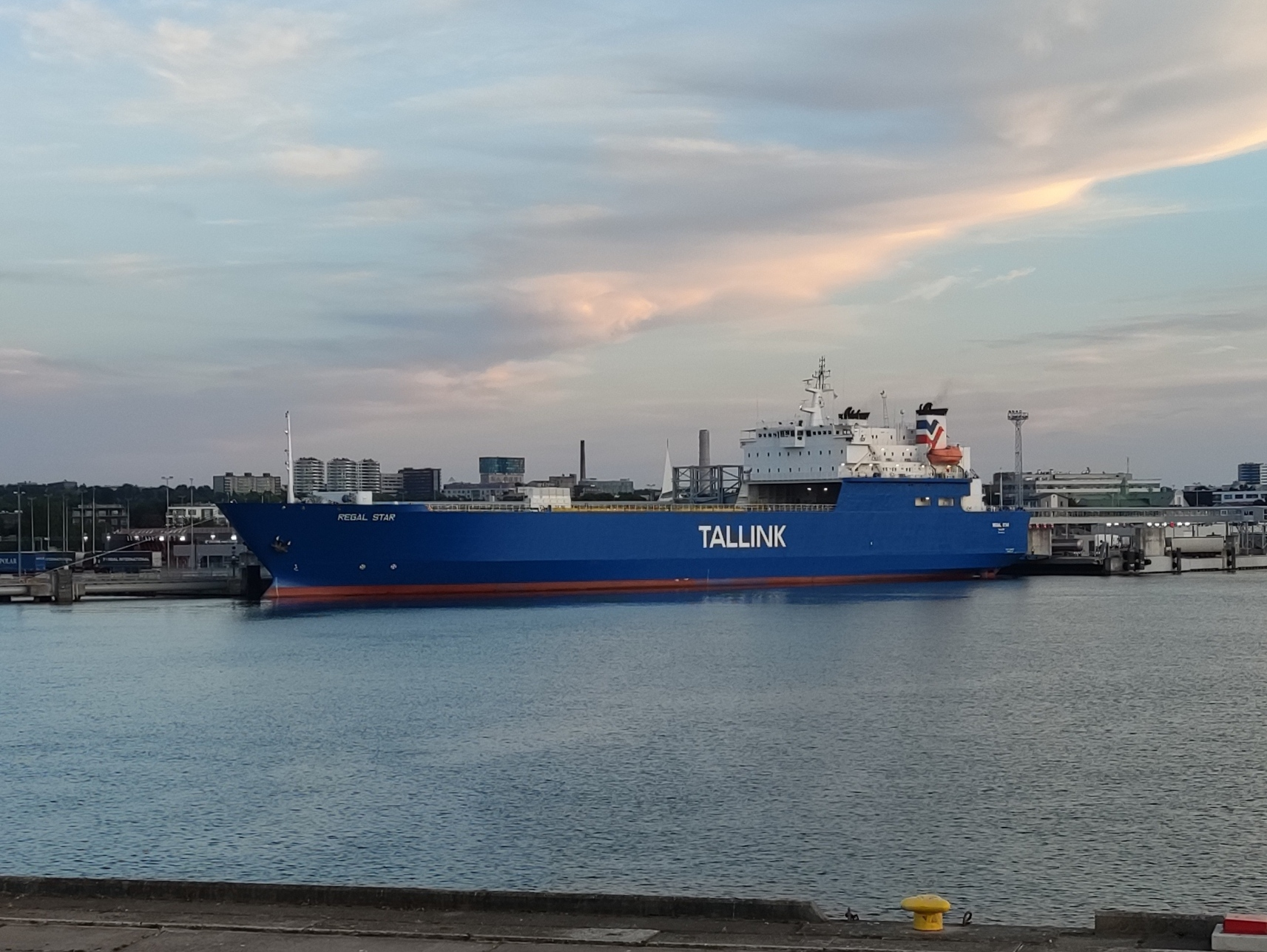

History
- Name: Regal Star (1993–2025); Med Express (2025–present)
- Owner: MCR SrL (2000–2003); Hansatee Shipping (2003–2004); Helsinki Line (2004–2025); Ams Line Shipping Company (since 2025)
- Operator: MCR SrL (2000); Grimaldi Ferries (2000–2003); Tallink Group (2003–2025); Ams Line Shipping Company (since 2025)
- Port of registry: Naples, Italy (2000–2003); Tallinn, Estonia (2003–2025); City of San Marino, San Marino (since 2025)
- Route: Savona–Catania (2000); Salerno–Palermo–Valencia (2000–2003); Paldiski–Kapellskär (2003–2006, 2007‍–‍2010, 2010–2025); Tallinn–Helsinki (2006); Turku–Stockholm (2010)
- Builder: Sudostroitelnyy Zavod Severnaya Verf / Palumba SpA
- Yard number: 668
- Launched: 1993
- Completed: 2000
- Identification: IMO number: 9087116

General characteristics
- Tonnage: 15,412 GT, 7,045 DWT
- Length: 156.60 metres (513 ft 9 in)
- Beam: 23.80 metres (78 ft 1 in)
- Draught: 6.70 metres (22 ft 0 in)
- Installed power: Two B&W 6DPH45 diesel engines, 8,700 kilowatts (11,700 hp)
- Speed: 18 knots (33 km/h)
- Capacity: 106 passengers, 1,740 lane metres cargo capacity

MS Med Express is a Ro-Ro ship owned by the Turkish shipping company Ams Line Shipping Company. The vessel was built in 1993 in Saint Petersburg and completed in 2000 in Naples, Italy. Med Express is registered under the flag of San Marino, with its official port of registry listed under San Marino jurisdiction.

== Description ==
The ship is 156.60 metres (513 ft 9 in) long, with a beam of 23.80 metres (78 ft 1 in) and a draught of 6.70 metres (22 ft 0 in). She is powered by two Burmeister & Wain 6DPH45 diesel engines, rated at a total of 8,700 kilowatts (11,700 hp). They propel the ship at 18 knots (33 km/h).

== History ==
The ship was built in 1993 as yard number 668 by Sudostroitelnyy Zavod Severnaya Verf, Saint Petersburg, Russia. The IMO Number 9087116 was allocated. She was laid up after launch and was sold in 1999. She was completed in 2000 by Palumba SpA, Naples, Italy for MCL SrL, Naples. Her port of registry was Naples. She entered service in March 2000 on the Savona–Catania route. In September, she was chartered by Grimaldi Ferries and entered service on the Salerno–Palermo–Valencia route.

In December 2003, Regal Star was sold to Hansatee Shipping, Tallinn, Estonia. She was transferred to the Estonian flag and placed under the management of Tallink Group. On 13 March 2003, the ship started operating on the Paldiski–Kapellskär route. In March 2006, she was transferred to the Tallinn–Helsinki route. She collided with the quayside at Helsinki and damaged her stern. Following repairs, she returned to service in January 2007 on the Paldiski–Kapellskär route. From June 2010, Regal Star operated on the Turku–Stockholm route. She returned to the Paldiski–Kapellskär route on 1 September 2010.

In November 2017, Regal Star had an additional section added which raised her tonnage to 15,412 GT and increased her passenger capacity.

In August 2025, Tallink announced the sale of Regal Star to Ams Line Shipping Co with the ship being handed over the same day.
