= MS Svea Regina =

Car and passenger ferry

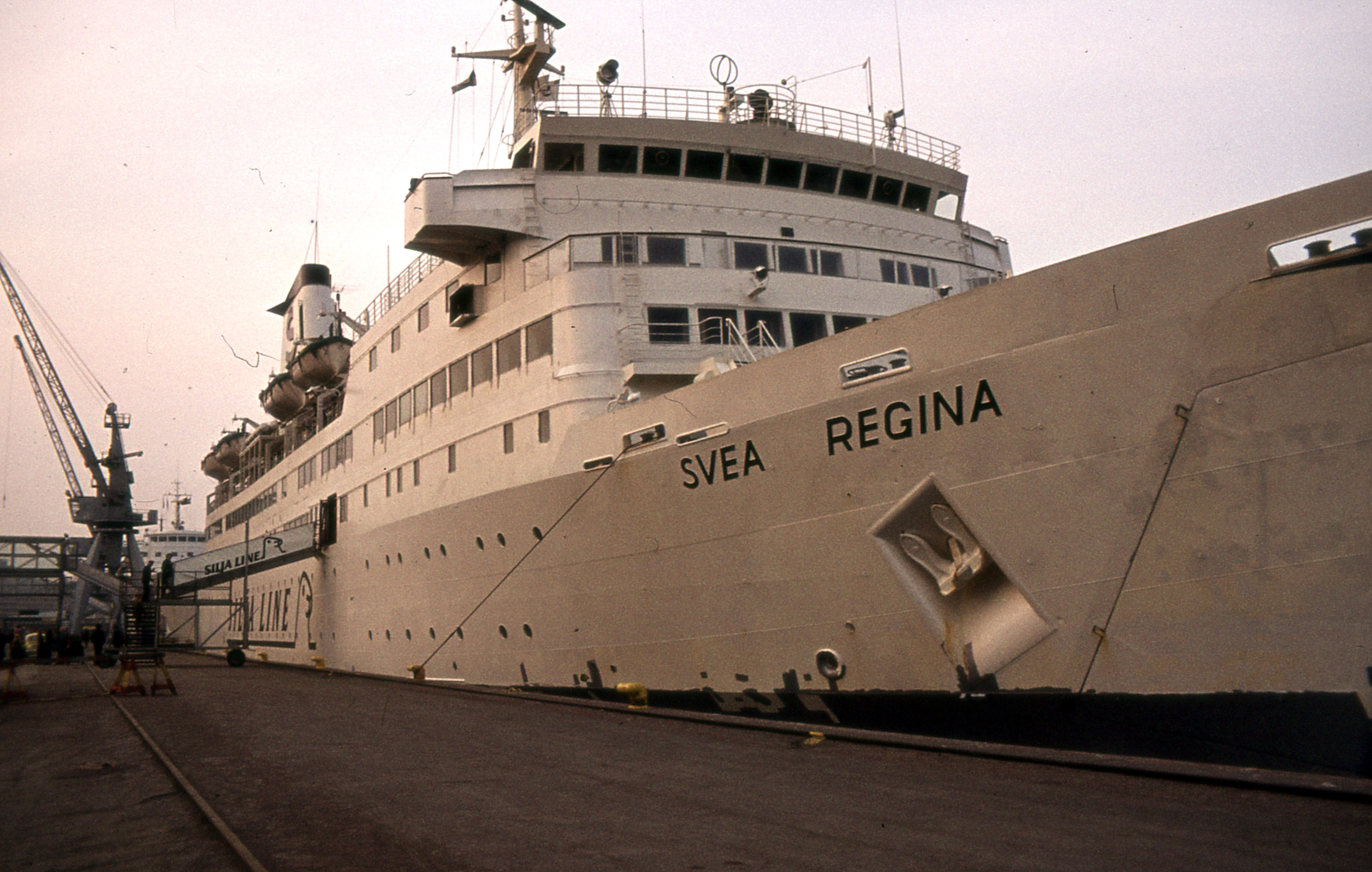
- MS Svea Regina in Stockholm, 1973

History
- Name: 1972–78: Svea Regina; 1978–79: Regina; 1979–82: Mediterranean Sun; 1982–85: Odysseas Eleytis; 1985–89: Scandinavian Sky; 1989–98: Tallink; 1998–2001: El Tor; 2001: Monte Carlo; 2001–05: El Safa
- Namesake: Odysseas Elytis (4rd name)
- Owner: 1972–78: Rederi AB Svea; 1978–79: Effoa; 1979–82: Karageorgis Lines; 1982–85: Maritime Company of Lesvos; 1985–89: SeaEscape; 1989–92: Palkkiyhtymä Oy; 1992–98: Tallink; 1998–2005: Sayed Nasr Navigation Lines
- Operator: 1972–76: Rederi AB Svea (Silja Line traffic); 1976–77: laid up; 1977: CNAN; 1977–78: laid up; 1978: Rederi AB Svea (Silja Line traffic); 1978: Effoa (Silja Line traffic); 1978–79: Polferries; 1979: Effoa (Silja Line traffic); 1979: Brittany Ferries; 1979: Effoa (Silja Line traffic); 1979–81: Karageorgis Lines; 1981–82: laid up; 1982–85: NEL Lines; 1985–89: SeaEscape; 1989–92: Finnlines (Tallink traffic); 1992–96: Tallink; 1996–98: laid up; 1998–2005: Sayed Nasr Navigation Lines
- Port of registry: 1972–78: Stockholm, Sweden; 1978–79: Helsinki, Finland; 1979–80: Piraeus, Greece; 1980–82: Limassol, Cyprus; 1982–85: Mytilene, Greece; 1985–89: Nassau, Bahamas; 1989–92: Helsinki, Finland; 1992–98: Tallinn, Estonia; 1998–2001: Belize City, Belize; 2001–05: Panama City, Panama
- Ordered: 2 January 1970
- Builder: Dubigeon Normandie, Nantes, France
- Yard number: 127
- Laid down: 6 February 1971
- Launched: 3 December 1971
- Christened: 25 May 1972 by Mrs Ingegerd Hägglöf
- Completed: 1972
- Acquired: 25 May 1972
- Maiden voyage: 5 June 1972
- In service: 5 June 1972
- Out of service: 3 April 2005
- Identification: IMO number: 7126322
- Fate: Scrapped in Alang, India, 2005

General characteristics (as built)
- Class & type: Aallotar class ferry
- Tonnage: 8,020 GRT; 1,230 t DWT
- Length: 126.74 m (415 ft 10 in)
- Beam: 19.54 m (64 ft 1 in)
- Draught: 5.17 m (17 ft)
- Ice class: 1 A
- Installed power: 2 × SEMT Pielstick 16PC2V-400 diesels; combined 11,769 kW / 16,000 BHP
- Propulsion: Two controllable pitch propellers; One bow thruster
- Speed: 18.5 kn (34.26 km/h)
- Capacity: 1,000 passengers; 450 berths; 180 cars; 315 lane metres

General characteristics (as rebuilt, 1985)
- Tonnage: 10,341 GT; 1,250 t DWT
- Decks: 8 (6 passenger accessible)
- Capacity: 1,090 passengers; 410 berths; 150 cars

MS Svea Regina was a car and passenger ferry, built in 1972 by the Dubigeon Normandie shipyard in Nantes, France for Rederi AB Svea for use in Silja Line traffic. She subsequently sailed under the names Regina, Mediterranean Sun, Odysseas Eleytis, Scandinavia Sky, Tallink, El Tor, Monte Carlo and El Safa, until scrapped in Alang, India in 2005. As Svea Regina she was, together with her sister MS Aallotar, the first ship to start year-round daily traffic between Helsinki and Stockholm, the capitals of Finland and Sweden, respectively.

== Concept and construction ==
In the late 1960s, ships operated in the Helsinki–Stockholm service were small liners owned by Finland Steamship Company (FÅA), Rederi AB Svea and Steamship Company Bore. The ships used in the service were not built for navigating through thick sea ice, and as a result service had to be suspended during the winter months. Siljavarustamo, a joint subsidiary of the three companies mentioned before, had begun operating purpose-built car/passenger ferries from western Finland to Stockholm and other nearby ports in 1961, and by the end of the decade Siljavarustamo begun planning for ferries for the Helsinki–Stockholm service as well. Plans were to construct two ferries for a daily service, with high enough ice classification to allow year-round traffic on the route, and high enough speed to allow them to depart in the evening, with an arrival in the following morning (instead of the daytime departures of the ships used in the service at the time).

The main responsibility for designing the ships was given to Carl-Bertel Engström, following objectives set by marketing executives Gösta Ryning and Kalevi Etelä. On 3 January 1971 Siljavarustamo placed an order for the new ships with the Dubigeon Normandie shipyard in Nantes, France. At the same time as the ships were ordered, the owners of Siljavarustamo were drawing up plans to reorganise their operations. The decision was made to turn Siljavarustamo into a joint marketing company for FÅA, Svea and Bore under the new name Silja Line, while the ships owned by Siljavatustamo would be transferred to the fleets of Siljavarustamo's owners. Just five days after the new ships were ordered, and attendum was signed, allowing for the building contract to be transferred to FÅA, Svea or Bore. In February 1970 the contract of the first ship was transferred to FÅA, eventually becoming their MS Aallotar, while the contract of the second ship was transferred to Svea on 9 November 1970.

The keel of the Svea-owned ship was laid on 2 June 1971, and she was launched six months later on 3 December 1971. On 13 February 1972 a storm broke the ship loose from her fitting-out berths, resulting in minor damage. Despite the difficulties the ship was delivered to Rederi AB Svea on 26 May 1972, and christened Svea Regina by Mrs Ingegerd Hägglöf, the wife of Mr Ingemar Hägglöf, the Swedish Ambassador to Finland. Following delivery the Svea Regina sailed from Nantes to Stockholm via the Kiel Canal. On 30 May 1972 she arrived at Nybroviken, Stockholm.

== Service history ==
=== 1972–1979 ===
On 5 June 1972 the Svea Regina set on her maiden voyage from Stockholm to Helsinki. The Aallotar had entered service four months previously, and with a Svea Regina joining her sister on the route, daily year-round service was initiated between the capitals of Finland and Sweden for the first time. Despite doubts voiced, even by people within the Silja consortium, the Aallotar and Svea Regina proved to be a phenomenal success. In practice the ships proved to be too small for the route within their first year of service, and already on 4 June 1973 FÅA, Svea and Bore placed orders for three larger ships to replace the Svea Regina and Aallotar on the Helsinki service.

The Svea Regina ended service on the Helsinki–Stockholm route on 24 May 1975 after less than three years, when she was replaced by the new and larger MS Svea Corona. The Svea Regina was initially moved to the Turku–Mariehamn–Stockholm service on the same date, but she returned to the Helsinki–Stockholm route during a docking of the Svea Corona between 20 June and 17 July of the same year. Following this she returned to the Turku–Stockholm service until 4 October 1975, when she joined the Aallotar in Turku–Norrtälje service. The line to Norrtälje was closed a year later, on 1 September 1976, and the Svea Regina was laid up in Stockholm.

Between 2 June and 30 August 1977 the Svea Regina was chartered to Compagnie Nationale Algérienne de Navigation Maritime (CNAN) for services from Marseille to Algiers, Béjaïa and Oran. Following the end of the charter she returned to Norrtälje for another lay-up period. In March 1978 the ship briefly returned to Silja Line service on the Turku–Stockholm route, before chartered as an accommodation vessel to Det Bergenske D/S A/S between 31 March and 20 May 1978. Following the end of the charter the ship again returned to Silja Line's Turku–Stockholm service for the duration of the 1978 summer season, after which she was again laid up, this time in Turku.

On 18 September 1978 the Svea Regina again returned to service this time for Silja Line's cruise traffic. Four days later she was sold by Rederi AB Svea to the Finland Steamship Company, and on 2 October 1978 her name was shortened to Regina and she was re-registered to Helsinki. Her initial service with Silja Cruise proved short, as she was chartered to Polferries on 27 October 1978, for use on their Helsinki–Nynäshamn–Gdańsk service. Polferries had also chartered the Aallotar for the same service, and for a while the two sisters again served together on the same route. The charter contracts for both the Regina and Aallotar included a purchase options, but although a Memorandum of Agreement about the sale of both ships had been signed in November and December 1978, respectively, in the end Polferries decided to purchase the Aallotar but not the Regina.

The charter to Polferries ended in April 1979, and subsequently the Regina was chartered to a German travel agency for cruises from Kiel to the Norwegian fjords from 20 March until 12 June 1979. After that charter she again returned to Turku–Stockholm service for Silja Line until 1 September 1979. After this she was briefly chartered to Brittany Ferries for their St Malo–Portsmouth service. Between 28 October and 29 November 1979 she returned to Turku–Stockholm service for one last time, for duration of the docking of the MS Wellamo.

=== 1979–1989 ===
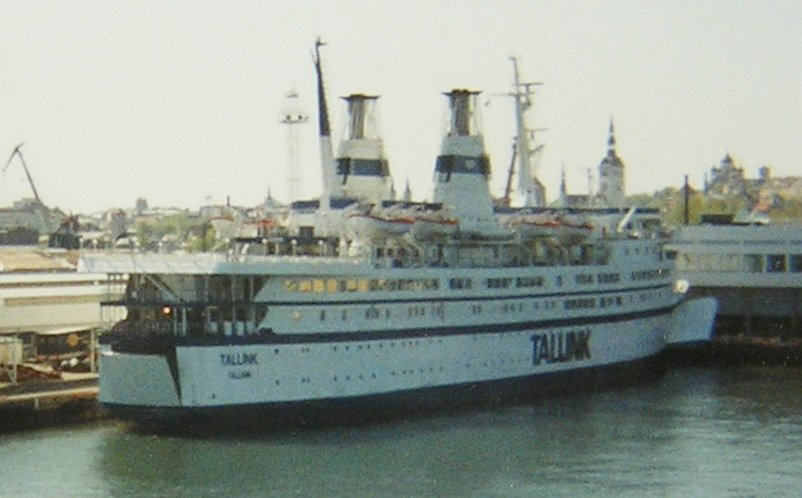
Tallink in Tallinn, 1994

On 29 November 1979 the Regina was sold to a holding company of the Karageorgis Lines, renamed Mediterranean Sun and re-registered in Greece. In 1980 she entered service on Karageorgis Lines' Patras–Ancona route. During the same year her ownership was transferred to a different Karageorgis Lines holding company, and she was re-registered in Cyprus. She remained on the Patras–Ancona service until 1981, when she was laid up in Patras. In 1982 the Mediterranean Sun was sold to the Maritime Company of Lesvos, again re-registered in Greece, renamed Odysseas Eleytis and placed in NEL Lines service on the Piraeus–Lesvos, Rhodes–Limassol–Alexandria and Piraeus–Rhodes services. In December 1983 the Odysseas Eleytis participated in the evacuation of Palestine Liberation Organization members, including Yasser Arafat, from Lebanon.

In June 1985 the Odysseas Eleytis was sold to the DFDS subsidiary SeaEscape, renamed Scandinavian Sky and re-registered at The Bahamas. She was radically rebuilt at Werft Nobiskrug, Rendsburg, Germany for use on SeaEscape's Miami–Bahamas cruise service, on which she entered service in August 1985.
