= Celestyal Crystal =

Cruise ship

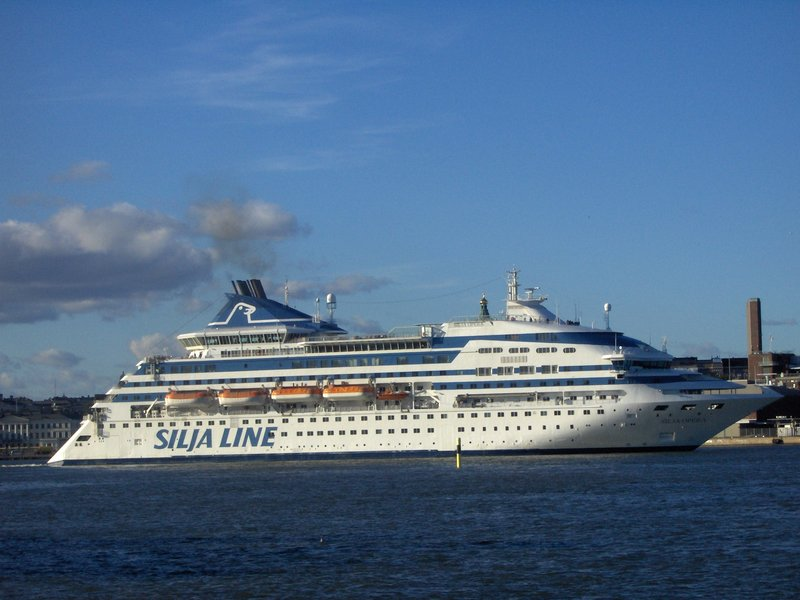
- Celestyal Crystal as Silja Opera in 2005

History

1980-1990
- Name: 1980–1986: Viking Saga; 1986–1990: Sally Albatross
- Owner: 1980–1982: Rederi Ab Sally; 1982–1989: Suomen Yritysrahoitus; 1989–1990: Partrederiet Sally Albatross
- Operator: 1980–1986: Rederi Ab Sally (in Viking Line traffic); 1986–1990: Sally Cruise
- Port of registry: 1980–1980: Turku, Finland; 1980–1982: Mariehamn, Åland; 1982: Helsinki, Finland; 1982–1990: Mariehamn, Åland
- Ordered: 22 December 1978
- Builder: Wärtsilä Perno Shipyard and Turku Shipyard, Turku, Finland
- Yard number: 1247
- Launched: 4 January 1980
- Christened: 20 March 1980
- Acquired: 26 June 1980
- In service: 27 June 1980
- Out of service: 9 January 1990
- Identification: IMO number: 7827213
- Fate: Destroyed by fire while in drydock in Nacka, Sweden. Completely rebuilt, 1990-1992 (technically considered the same ship).

General characteristics (as built, 1980)
- Class & type: Viking Saga class cruiseferry
- Tonnage: 14,330 GT; 2,874 DWT
- Length: 145.18 m (476 ft 4 in)
- Beam: 25.49 m (83 ft 8 in)
- Draught: 5.51 m (18 ft 1 in)
- Ice class: 1 A Super
- Installed power: 4 × Wärtsilä-Pielstick 12PC2-5V-400 diesels; 19,124 kW (combined)
- Speed: 21.3 knots (39.4 km/h; 24.5 mph)
- Capacity: 2,000 passengers; 1,300 berths; 426 cars

General characteristics (as rebuilt, 1988)
- Type: cruise ship
- Tonnage: 15,179 GT; 2,774 DWT
- Length: 149.96 m (492 ft 0 in)
- Capacity: 1,016 passengers; 1,016 berths
- Notes: Otherwise the same as built

1992–2025
- Name: 1992–1995: Sally Albatross; 1995–2000: Leeward; 2000–2002: SuperStar Taurus; 2002–2006: Silja Opera; 2006–2007: Opera; 2007–2011: Cristal; 2011–2015: Louis Cristal; 2015–2023: Celestyal Crystal; 2024–2025: New Dawn; 2025: Right
- Owner: 1992–1992: Sally Oy Ab; 1992–1995: Silja Line; 1995–2002: Crown Jewel, Inc; 2002–2006: Silja Line; 2006–2007: Sea Containers Ltd; 2007–2007: Citron Navigation Corp.; 2007–2007: Opera Acquisition, LLC; 2007–2012: Citron Navigation Corp.; 2012–2023: Cristal Trading Opco LLC
- Operator: 1992–1992: Sally Cruise; 1992–1994: Silja Line; 1995–2000: Norwegian Cruise Line; 2000–2002: Star Cruises; 2002–2006: Silja Line; 2007–2015: Louis Cruise Lines; 2015–2023: Celestyal Cruises
- Port of registry: 1992–1995: Mariehamn, Finland; 1995–2002: Panama, Panama; 2002–2006: Stockholm, Sweden; 2006–2007: Nassau, Bahamas; 2007–2012: Piraeus, Greece; 2012–2025: Valletta, Malta
- Ordered: 22 December 1978
- Builder: Finnyards, Rauma, Finland
- Yard number: 309
- Laid down: 1990
- Launched: 25 July 1991
- Christened: 25 July 1991
- Completed: 1992
- Acquired: 23 March 1992
- Maiden voyage: 23 March 1992
- In service: March 1992
- Out of service: 2023
- Identification: Call sign: 9HA2978; IMO number: 7827213; MMSI number: 229001000
- Fate: Scrapped May 2025

General characteristics (as rebuilt, 1992)
- Type: cruise ship
- Tonnage: 25,076 GT; 25,611 GT (after 1995); 1,703 DWT
- Length: 158.90 m (521 ft 4 in)
- Beam: 25.20 m (82 ft 8 in)
- Draught: 5.80 m (19 ft 0 in)
- Decks: 9 (passenger accessible), with 476 cabins
- Propulsion: 2 propellers; 2 bow thrusters; 1 stern thruster
- Speed: 21 knots (39 km/h; 24 mph)
- Capacity: 1,452 passengers; 1,200 passenger (after 1995); 950 passengers (after 2000); 1,409 passengers (after 2002)
- Notes: Otherwise the same as built

Celestyal Crystal was a cruise ship, operated between 2007 and 2023 by the Cyprus-based Louis Group's Louis Cruise Lines and Celestyal Cruises. The ship was originally built as the cruiseferry Viking Saga in the 1980 at Wärtsilä Perno Shipyard and Turku Shipyard, Turku, Finland for Rederi Ab Sally. In 1986 she was renamed Sally Albatross, and rebuilt into a cruise ship the following year. The ship was destroyed by a fire in 1990, and completely rebuilt at Finnyards, Rauma, Finland. She was re-delivered in 1992, still named Sally Albatross. After partially sinking 1994 she was rebuilt at Industrie Navali Meccaniche Affini, La Spezia, Italy, re-entering service as Leeward for Norwegian Cruise Line. Subsequently, she sailed as SuperStar Taurus for Star Cruises, Silja Opera for Silja Line. After being temporarily renamed Opera she was in service with Louis Group as Louis Cristal and later Celestyal Crystal.

== History ==
=== Viking Saga ===
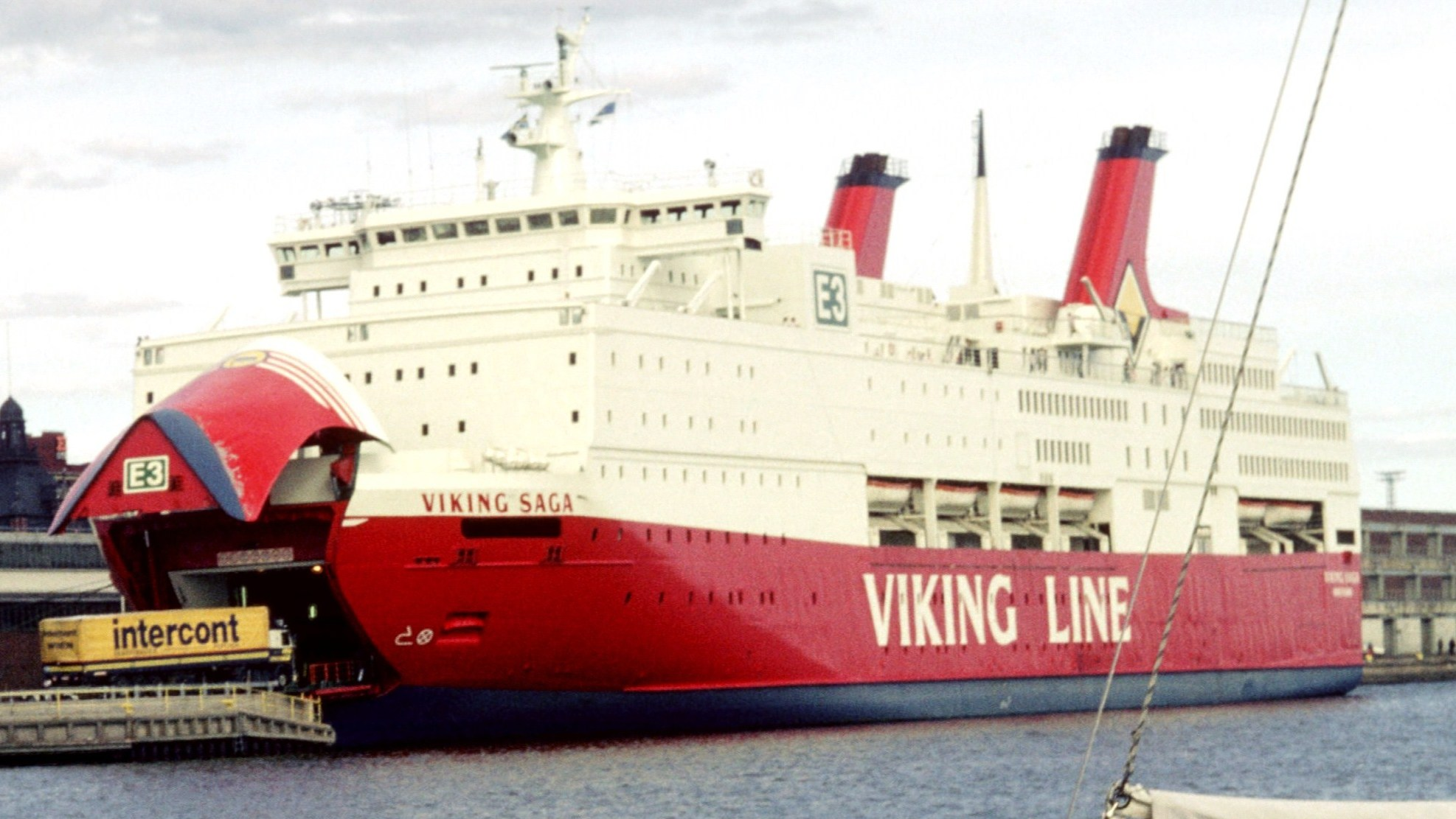
MS Viking Saga in original appearance and livery

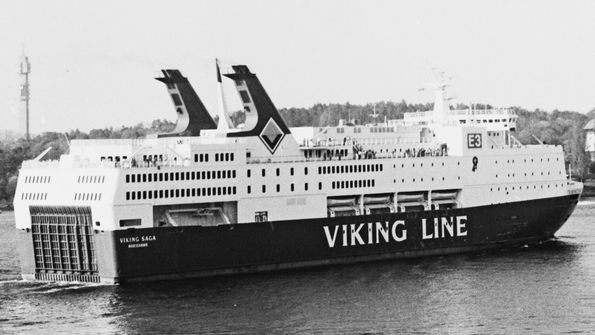
Viking Saga, 1980s

The ship was originally built in 1980 for Rederi Ab Sally, one of Viking Line partners as the cruiseferry MS Viking Saga. The bow and stern modules were built at Wärtsilä Turku Shipyard and the middle part was made at Wärtsilä Perno Shipyard. The modules were assembled together and the ship was launched in Perno and the hull was tugged after to Turku Shipyard for outfitting.

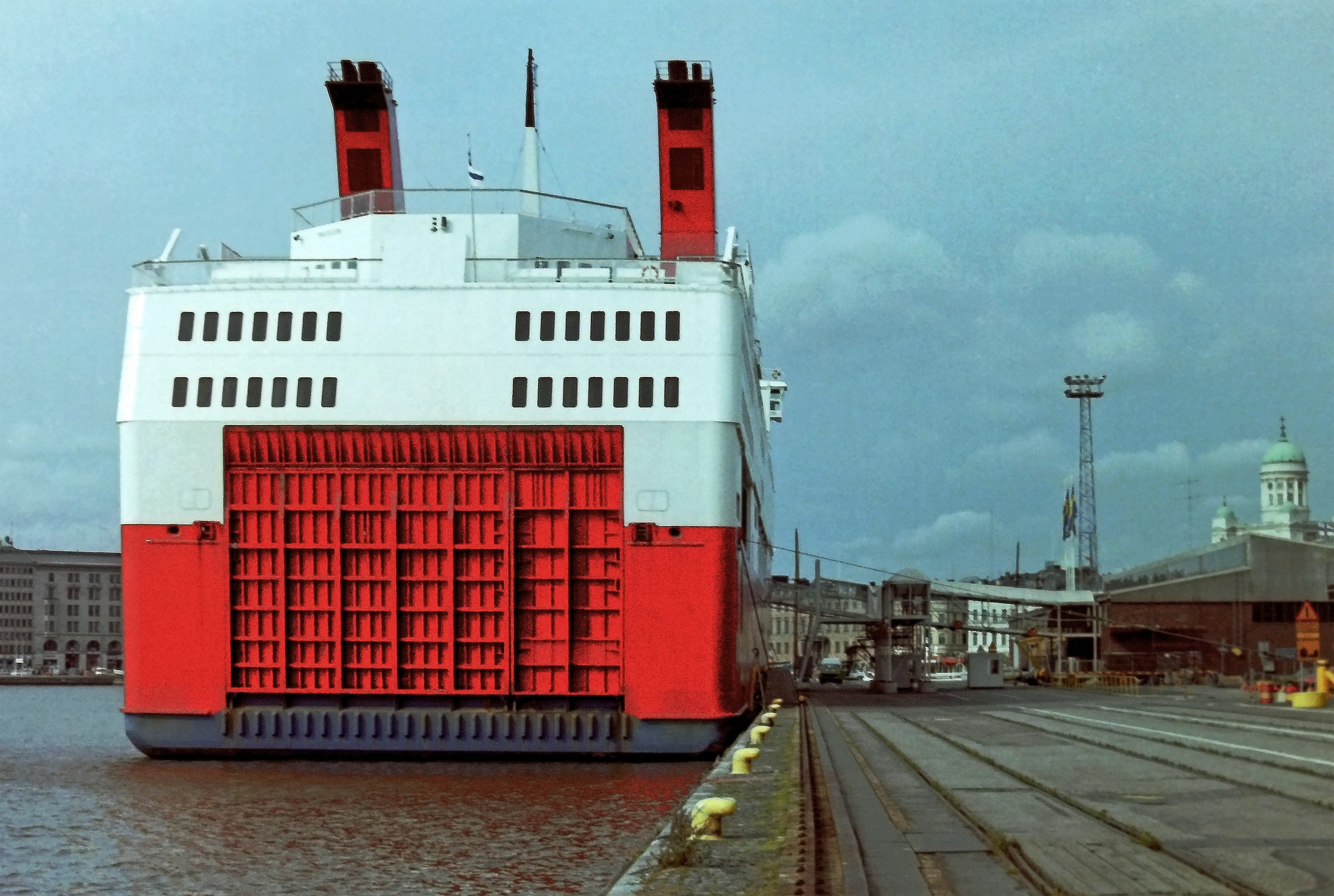
Viking Saga in Helsinki, 1984

In 1979-1981 the Baltic ferry operators Silja Line and Viking Line brought several new cruiseferries to the routes connecting Stockholm to Helsinki and Turku. Viking Line received a total of four new ships in 1980 alone, three of which were built for Rederi AB Sally. The Viking Saga and her sister ship MS Viking Song were built by Wärtsilä (now Aker Finnyards) in Turku, Finland. MS Viking Sally (later MS Estonia) was built at the Meyer Werft shipyard in Papenburg, Germany. Two of the Sally ships have been involved in a total of three serious accidents. The Viking Saga was the first genuine cruiseferry in Finland — Sweden traffic. The interior and exterior design of her and her sister was heavily influenced by those of GTS Finnjet of 1977. The Viking Saga and Viking Song, alongside Silja Line's contemporary MS Finlandia and MS Silvia Regina, were instrumental in turning the Helsinki — Stockholm route into a popular cruise route.

In June 1982, the ship was sold by Rederi Ab Sally to Suomen Yritysrahoitus, who chartered her back to Sally. In 1985 the Viking Saga hit bottom near Sandhamn in the Stockholm archipelago, and had to be docked in Stockholm.

=== Sally Albatross (I) ===
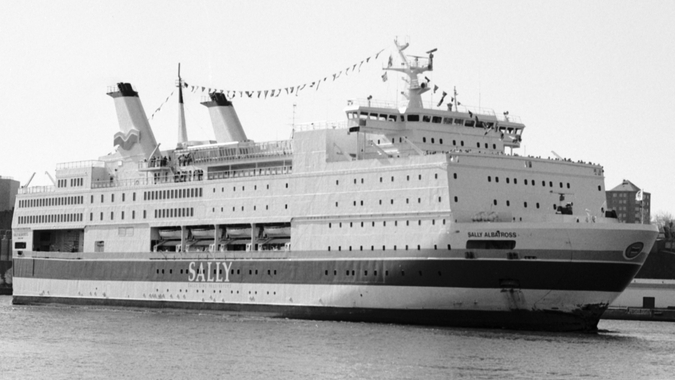
Sally Albatross in Stockholm

After MS Olympia replaced her on the Helsinki — Stockholm route in April 1986, the Viking Saga was rebuilt for use as a cruise ship at Wärtsilä Helsinki New Shipyard. She did not become a "real" cruise ship as her cardecks were not built in. During conversion there was a fire on board, but it was extinguished by the shipyard staff. Renamed Sally Albatross, the ship entered service for the new Sally Cruise brand in May 1986. She was mainly used for cruising around the Baltic Sea from Helsinki. In 1987 Rederi Ab Sally was sold to its rivals Effoa and Johnson Line. In January–February 1988 the Sally Albatross was comprehensively rebuilt at Schichau Seebeckwerft, Bremerhaven, West Germany, where additional cabin were built on the former upper cardeck, the forward superstructure was built to a more streamlined appearance and smaller changes were made to the bow and other parts of the superstructure. At the same time the ships livery was altered, in addition to the light and dark blue stripes running along the hull black stripes were painted along the windows of the superstructure, giving the ship an even more streamlined appearance. The cost of the reconstruction was 35 million Finnish markka.

==== Fire ====
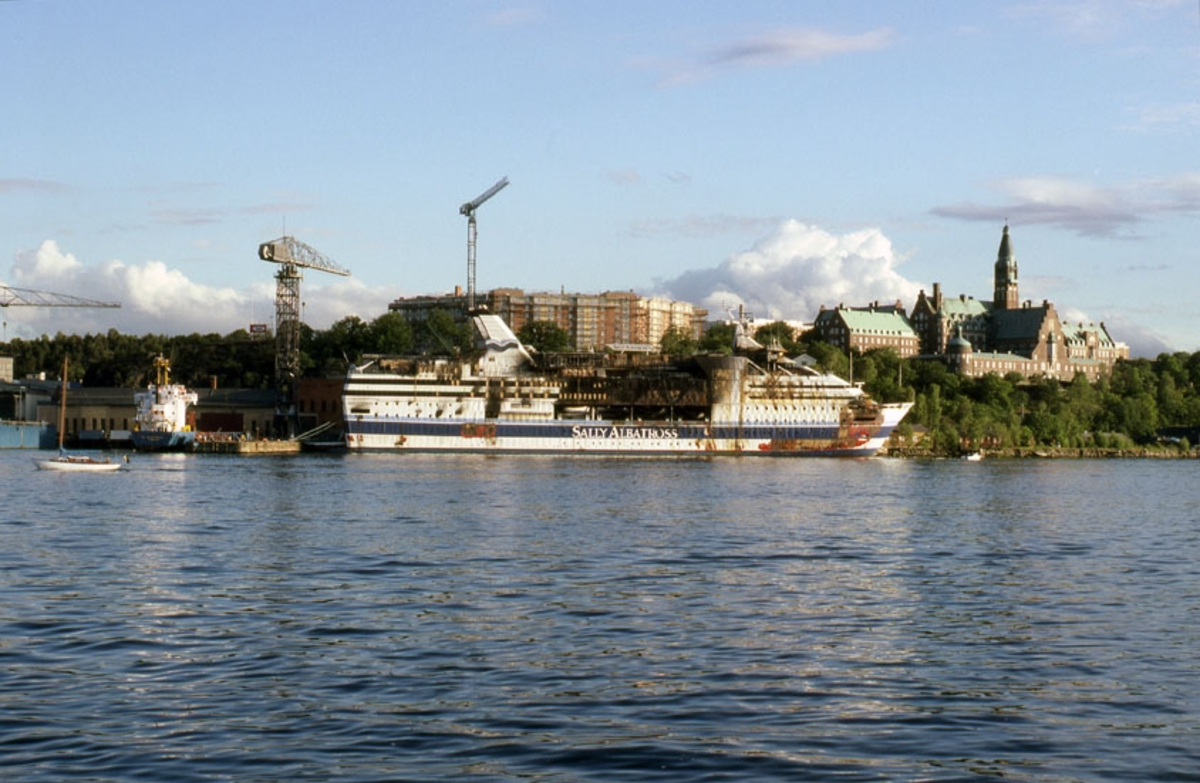
Sally Albatross after the fire

In January 1990, while docked at the Finnboda Shipyard in Nacka, Sweden, for reconstruction of the ship's restaurants, nightclub and conference facilities, practically the entire superstructure of the ship was damaged beyond repair by a fire which had started from drops of liquid metal sparkling on flammable material. The ship's sprinkler system was turned off for the duration of the docking, fire hydrants were dry and the temporary fire water supply was disconnected. In addition to this the fire watchman left for lunch during the hot work. Due to the danger of gas bottles (oxy-acetylene used in the reconstruction) exploding in the heat, the fire brigade withdrew from the interior of two decks under reconstruction, after having rescued the two crew members that were missing during the initial phase of the fire. Further fire fighting was conducted from the outside and from the decks above and below the reconstruction work. As a result, the ship burned extensively for three days.

All workers and crew (and an American actress who had been on board) were rescued by the fire brigade and a crane operator from the shipyard and there were no deaths.

=== Sally Albatross (II) ===
==== Reconstruction ====
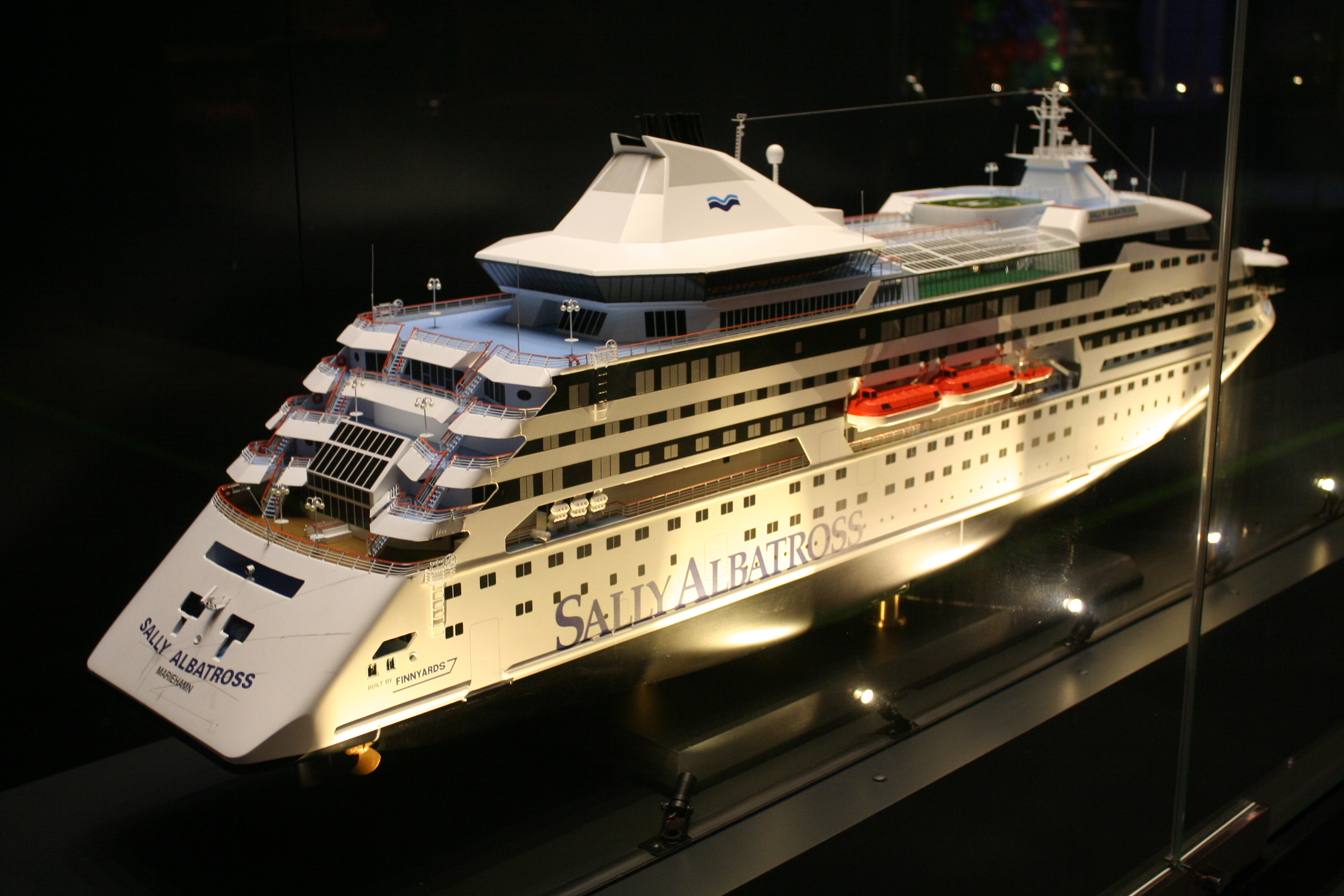
Sally Albatross as she appeared after the 1992 rebuilding. The model is on display at the Finnish Maritime Museum.

The burnt-out hull was first towed to Mäntyluoto, Finland, where she was partially scrapped, leaving only the hull below cardeck intact. After this the remains were towed into Naantali, Finland where the remaining hull was cut into several sections. These were then transported to Finnyards shipyard in Rauma, Finland where they were used as the basis of a new ship with the project name Sally Eurocruiser. She was to be a genuine cruiseship, without a cardeck. The hull was lengthened by 13 meters compared to the original, and the passenger (cabin) capacity was increased by 452, so the new ship was actually larger than the old one. One notable piece retained from the original ship were the engines. The cost of the rebuilding was approximately 700 million Finnish markka. In essence this was a completely new ship, and she is usually listed as such in most sources. Her owners decided to keep the name Sally Albatross, which has led to some sources (and many passengers) to consider the second Sally Albatross to be the same ship as the first.

The new Sally Albatross was delivered to Sally Cruise on 23 March 1992 and started doing cruises in the Baltic Sea with Helsinki as the port of departure, in a similar arrangement as she had done in the late 80's. In July of the same year she was chartered to Svea 92 (a Swedish consortium for advancing exports) as a hotel and conference ship for the 1992 Summer Olympics in Barcelona for 1 000 000 Finnish markka per day. Originally Svea 92 had wanted to charter Silja Line's Swedish-flagged Svea (which would have matched the name better). In September that same year Sally Albatross was transferred to Silja Line, who also were a part of the EffJohn concern. Despite joining the Silja fleet Sally Albatross' old colour scheme and Sally Cruise funnel colours were maintained.

Although the 1980 ship and the 1992 ship appear unalike, both externally and internally, they share the same IMO number because they are technically the same ship.

A video of Sally Albatross after her ran aground, 1994

On 4 March 1994 Sally Albatross ran aground in the ice covered sea outside Porkkala. She was towed to shallow waters and her passengers evacuated. After this the ship was left on site, listing badly. While preparations were made to re-float her. Re-floating the ship proved to be a complicated process, and it was not until the 16th of April that the ship was afloat again. She was then towed to the abandoned Vuosaari shipyard (where she arrived on 20 April) where the most necessary repairs were made. After inspection it was determined that the cost to repair the damage would be around 200 million FIM ($35 million USD).

=== Leeward / SuperStar Taurus ===
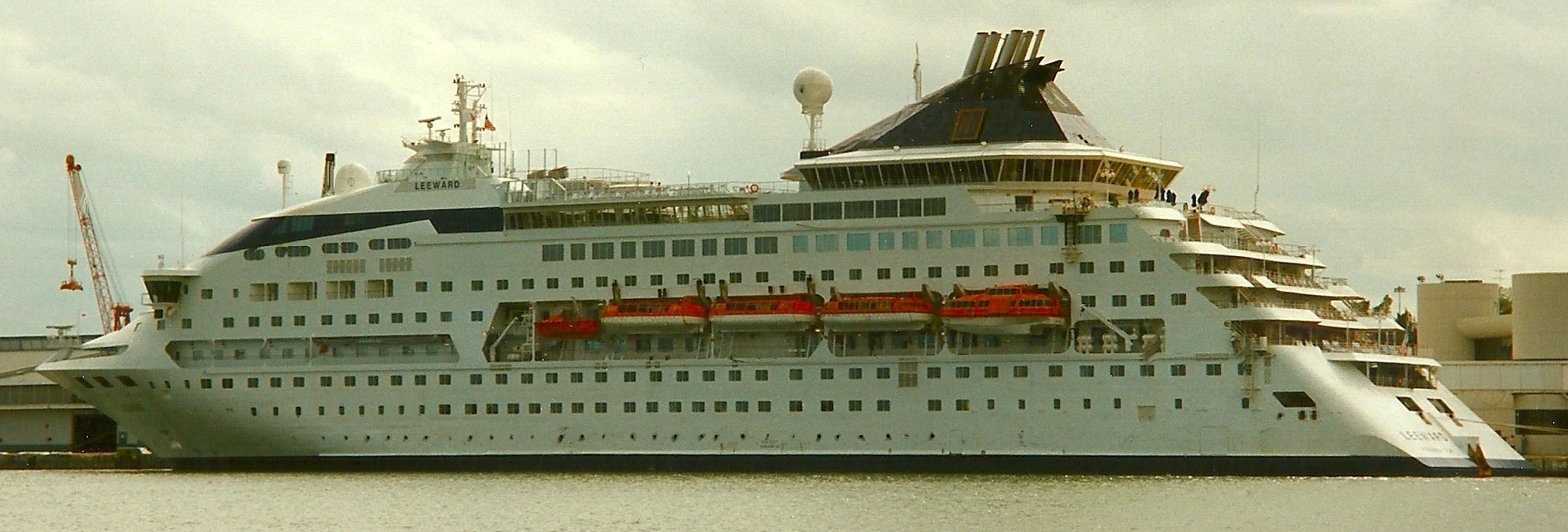
Leeward in Miami, Florida

In October 1994 the ship was towed to La Spezia, Italy where she was repaired and rebuilt for international cruise traffic. She was then chartered to Norwegian Cruise Line who renamed her Leeward and put her on cruises in the Bahamas from July 1995 onwards. In March 2000 the ship was chartered for three years to Star Cruises (owners of Norwegian Cruise Line) who renamed her Superstar Taurus and used her on various cruises around Asia, mostly cruising from Japan. In December 2001 Star Cruises broke the charter contract and the ship was once again in the hands of Silja Line.

=== Silja Opera ===
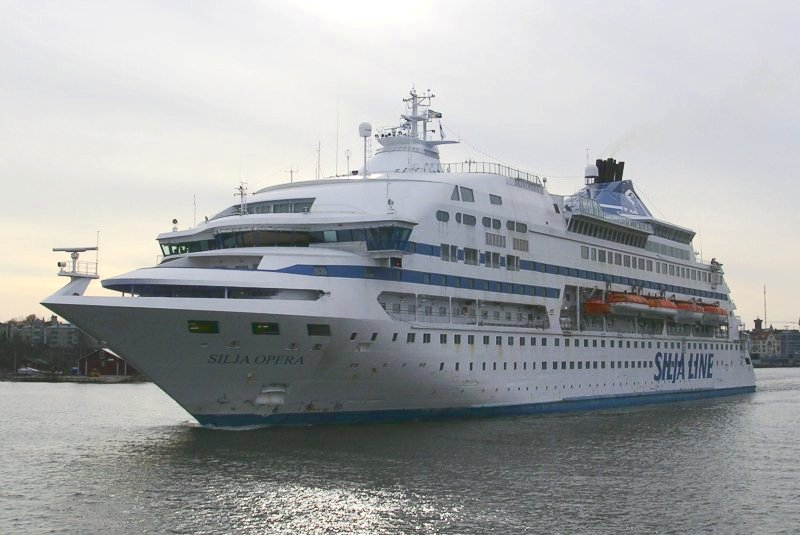
Silja Opera departing Helsinki sometime between 2002 and 2005

Superstar Taurus sailed back to Europe, and between February and June 2002 she was vastly rebuilt at Turku Repair Yard, Naantali, Finland for cruise service on the Baltic Sea. On 1 June 2002 the ship was renamed Silja Opera and placed under Swedish flag. Silja Opera (re)started cruising the Baltic Sea on 29 June 2002, with Helsinki as the starting point. She followed a similar itinerary as she had done as Sally Albatross, making one-day cruise from Helsinki and two-night cruises to Visby, Riga (discontinued after one season) and St. Petersburg. The ship already had a reputation as a ship of bad luck amongst the public (she had after all burnt out completely once and partially sunk only a few years later, in addition to smaller mishaps), and this was not helped when in September 2003 she collided with three cargo-ships in Saint Petersburg, resulting in minor damage to all parties. Less than two months later, in almost precisely same spot, she collided with a Russian icebreaker.

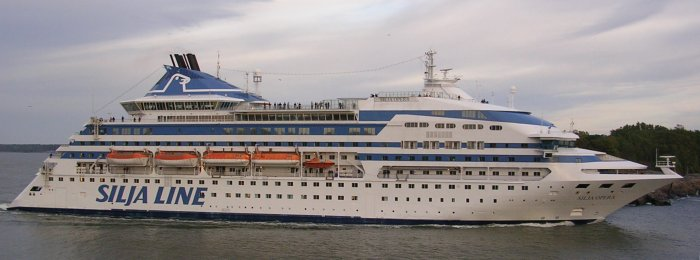
In 2005, the Silja Opera's livery was altered with additional blue stripes, resembling the livery she carried as Sally Albatross between 1992 and 1994.

Silja Opera's cruises from Helsinki were not very popular, and in October 2004 she began making cruises from Stockholm to Tallinn (via Mariehamn in order to have tax-free sales on board). These too failed to find popularity, and in February 2005 she was transferred back to cruising from Helsinki. Around this same time her white-dominant livery was changed to one closely resembling her Sally-era livery, but with blue stripes instead of black. With the ship continuing to lose money, in September 2005 Silja Line made public its plans to use cheaper foreign workforce on board. However they could not do so under the terms Swedish maritime worker's collective labour agreement. Two months later Silja Line decided to cut costs by concentrating on their core markets and the Silja Opera, alongside the prestigious GTS Finnjet, was to be sold. In January 2006 Silja Opera made her last cruises from Helsinki, after which she was transferred to the Turku—Mariehamn—Kapellskär route in place of MS Silja Europa (that was in turn transferred to Helsinki—Stockholm route while the normal ships of that route were being rebuilt). On 13 February 2006, the Silja Opera stopped sailing for Silja Line, and three days later she was laid up Stockholm, waiting for potential buyers.

On 22 May 2006, Silja Opera left Stockholm for the last time bound for lay up at Tilbury Docks, located to the east of Greater London. The ship arrived on 25 May, soon afterwards the Silja Line markings were painted over and her ownership was transferred to SeaContainers, then the parent company of Silja Line. At the same time she was changed from Swedish to Bahamian flag and her name was shortened to Opera.

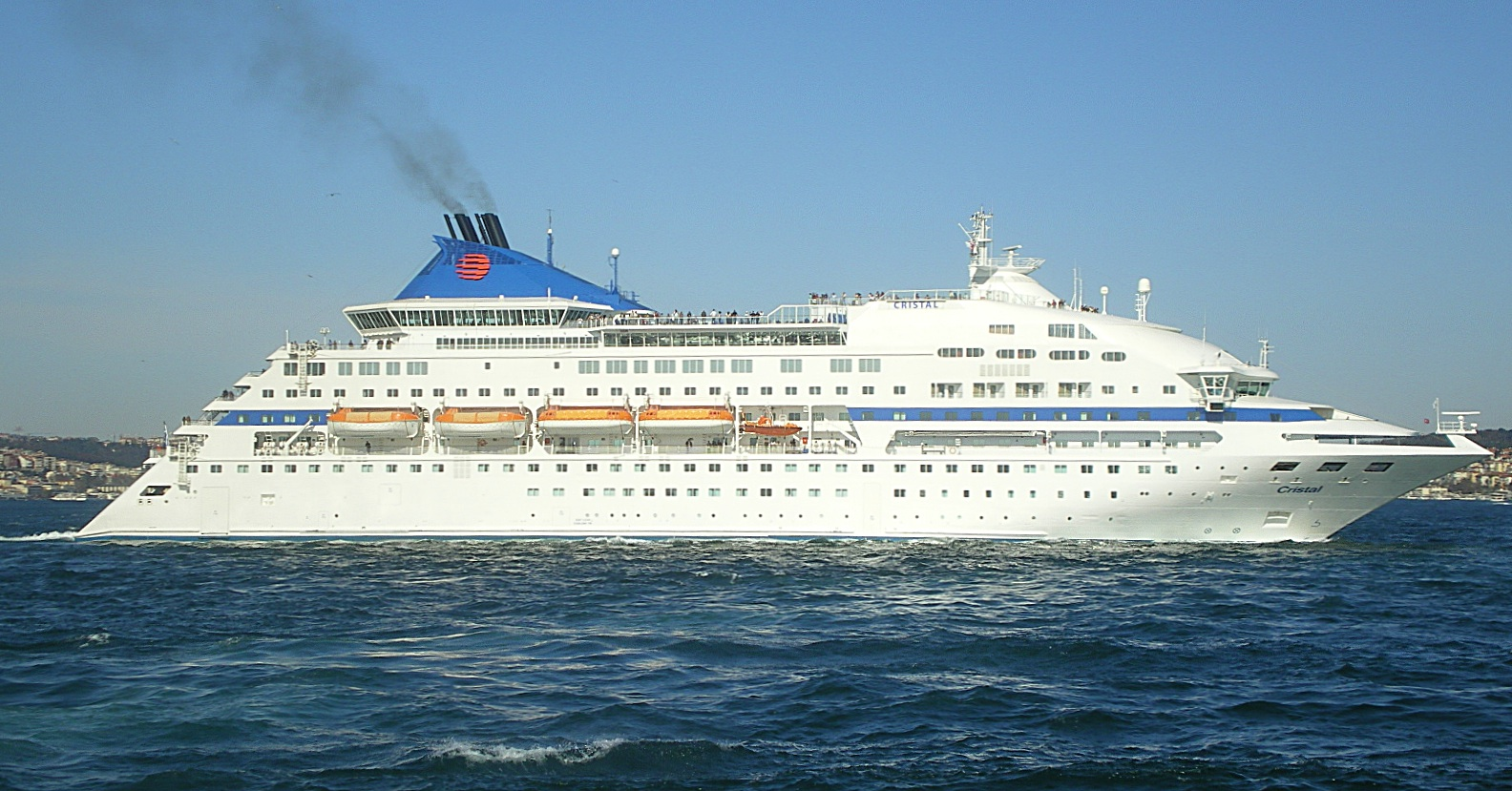
Cristal in Istanbul, 2010

=== Cristal ===
In May 2007 the Opera was sold to the Cyprus-based Louis Cruise Lines to replace MS Sea Diamond that had sunk some months before. After rebuilding at Piraeus, Greece, the ship was renamed MS Cristal and started service for the Louis Hellenic Cruise Lines-brand in July 2007.

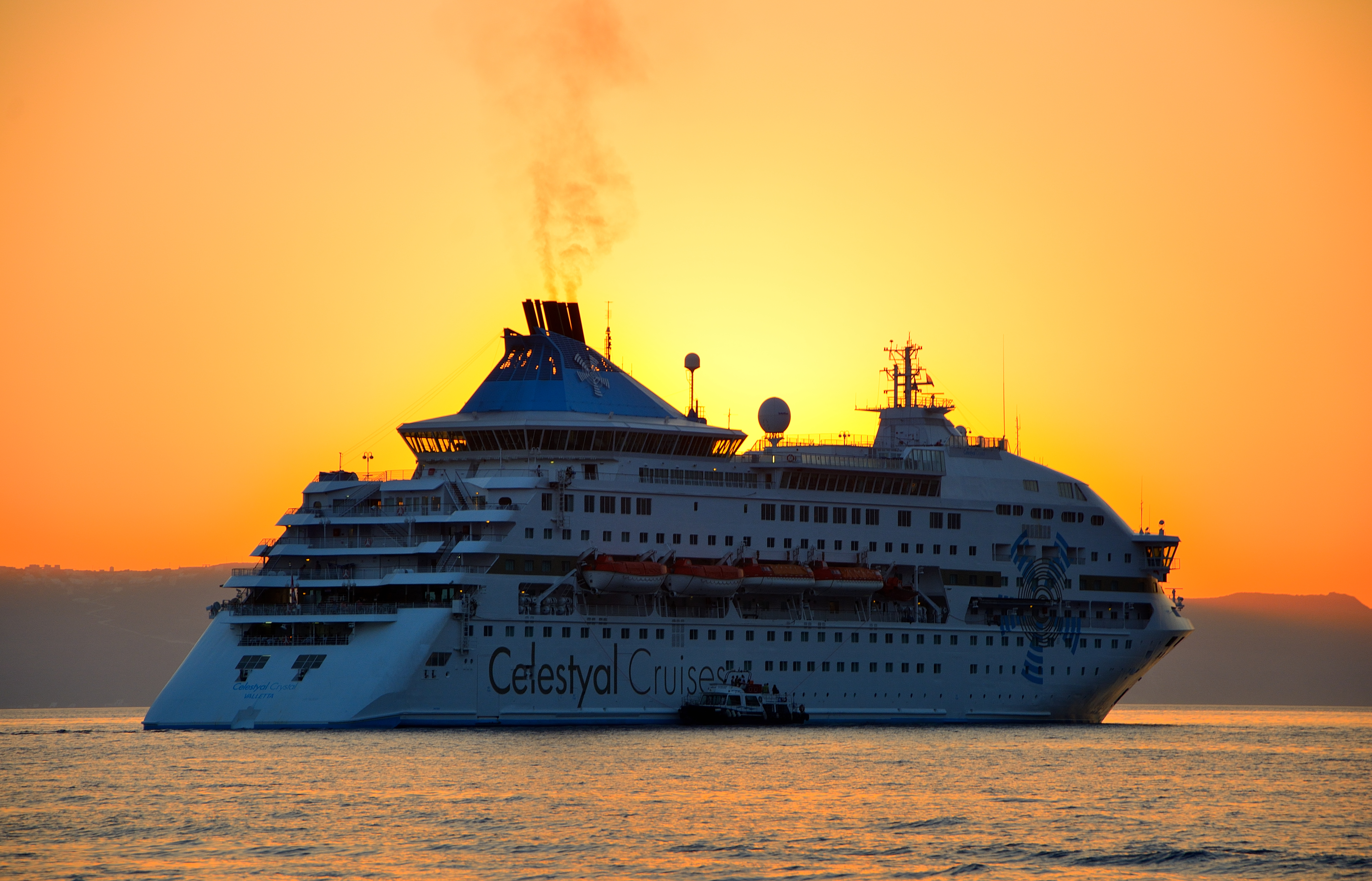
Celestyal Crystal in Santorini, 2015

=== Celestyal Crystal ===
As part of Louis Cruise Lines re-brand as Celestyal Cruises, announced in November 2014, Crystal was renamed Celestyal Crystal and received a new livery.

On 27 June 2015, Celestyal Crystal collided with the tanker STI Pimlico in the Dardanelles off Gallipoli, Turkey. Three people sustained minor injuries.

Due to the COVID-19 pandemic all cruises from March 16, 2020, to March 6, 2021, were suspended.

Following the acquisition of the new Celestyal Journey, Celestyal Crystal was phased out, ending her last cruise on 20 August 2023. It was reported that the ship was sold to Shimizu Cruises, to operate as Erena on cruises in Japan starting from 2024, but this was denied by Celestyal.

In 2025, the former Crystal was sold to a scrapyard in Alang, India. Renamed Star Bright for its last voyage, the ship left Lavrion in Mid-April and, after a stop at Duqm, Oman, arrived at its final destination on May 15, 2025.
