= Sally Cruise =

Cruise ship company

- Industry: Shipping
- Founded: 1986
- Defunct: 1992
- Fate: Merged into Silja Line
- Headquarters: Helsinki, Finland
- Area served: Baltic Sea
- Services: Passenger transportation
- Parent: Rederi Ab Sally

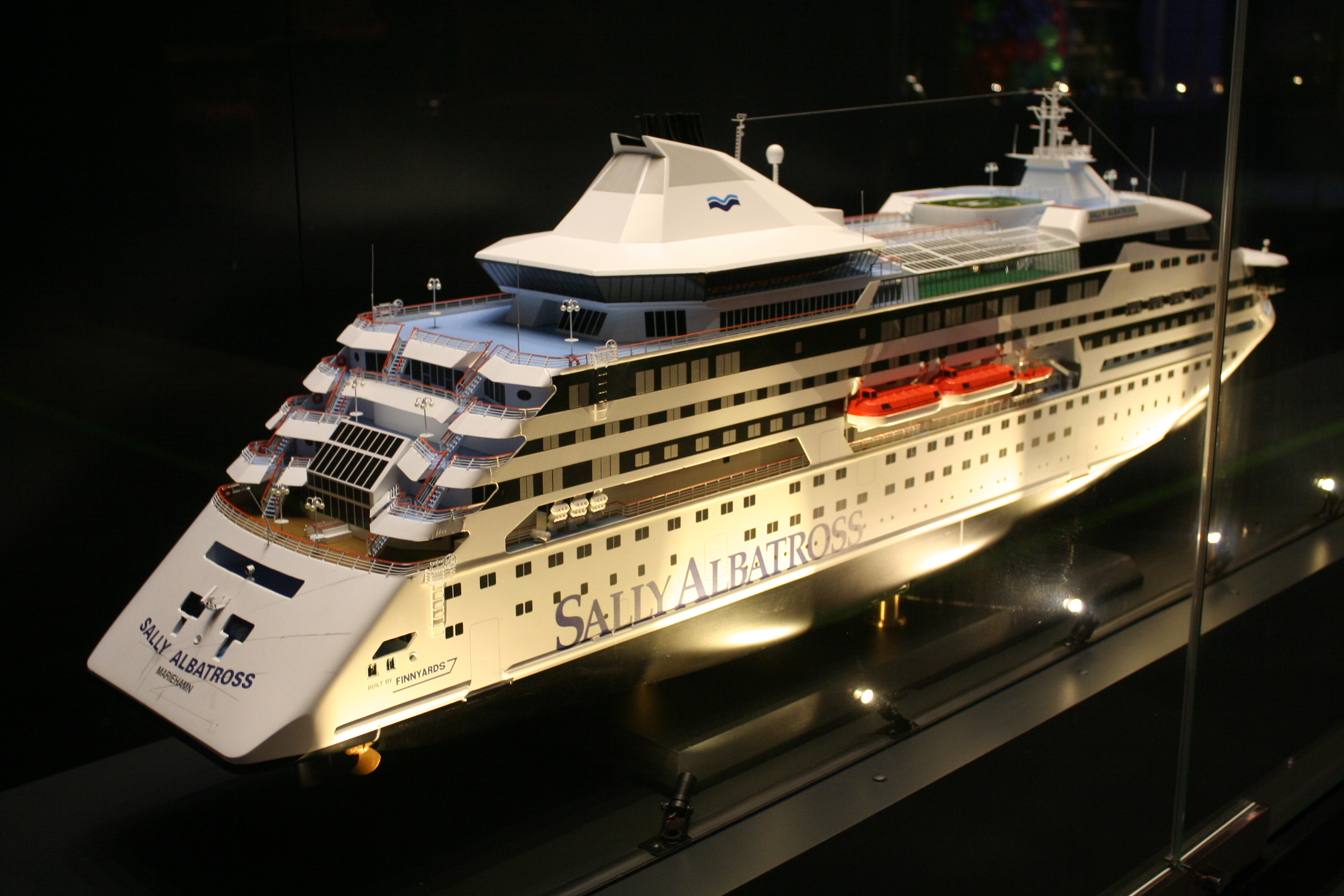
A model of MS Sally Albatross as she appeared after rebuilding in 1992

Sally Cruise was a wholly owned subsidiary of Rederi Ab Sally, Finland that operated cruise ships on the Baltic Sea between the years 1986 and 1992. It was merged into Silja Line 1992.

== Company history ==
Rederi Ab Sally had been, until the early 1980s, the dominant partner in the Viking Line consortium. However, due to investing in unprofitable operations outside the Baltic Sea they started losing their foothold in Viking during the mid-80s when the other partners (SF Line and Rederi AB Slite) took delivery of new tonnage that supplanted Sally's newest ships. In 1986 when Sally's MS Viking Saga was replaced by the new MS Olympia, the decision was made not to sell the Viking Saga but use her to start a new company, Sally Cruise, to operate short cruises out of Helsinki, Finland. At this time one-day cruises to nowhere were still a novel idea, the first ones had been made only the previous year by GTS Finnjet.

After a refit the Viking Saga re-emerged as MS Sally Albatross, painted in an attractive white livery with dark and light blue bands running along her hull. Despite the Sally Albatross' success her parent company's downward spiral continued, and in 1987 the company was sold to their main rivals Effoa and Johnson Line (owners of Silja Line). The change of ownership meant additional investments made in Sally Cruise, and the Sally Albatross was rebuilt in 1988. However, disaster struck in 1990 when the Sally Albatross was burnt out while in drydock at Finnboda, Nacka, Sweden.

Sally Cruises quickly chartered MS Delfin Clipper from the short-lived Delfin Cruises and renamed her MS Sally Clipper to replace the burnt-out Sally Albatross. By the end of the year 1990 the salvageable parts of the burnt-out Sally Albatross were being used to build a new ship, codenamed Sally Eurocruiser. Before she was completed in 1992 Sally also chartered Sally Clipper's sister ship MS Delfin Caravelle under the name Sally Caravelle in 1991.

In March 1992 the new MS Sally Albatross debuted for Sally Cruise. However, in order to cut costs her owners EffJohn (a merger between Rederi Ab Sally, Effoa and Johnson Line created in 1990) decided to terminate Sally Cruise as an independent company in September 1992, and the company was merged in Silja Line.

== Fleet ==
- MS Sally Albatross (1986–1990, 1992)
- MS Sally Clipper (1990)
- MS Sally Caravelle (1991)
