= Moby Dada =

Cruiseferry

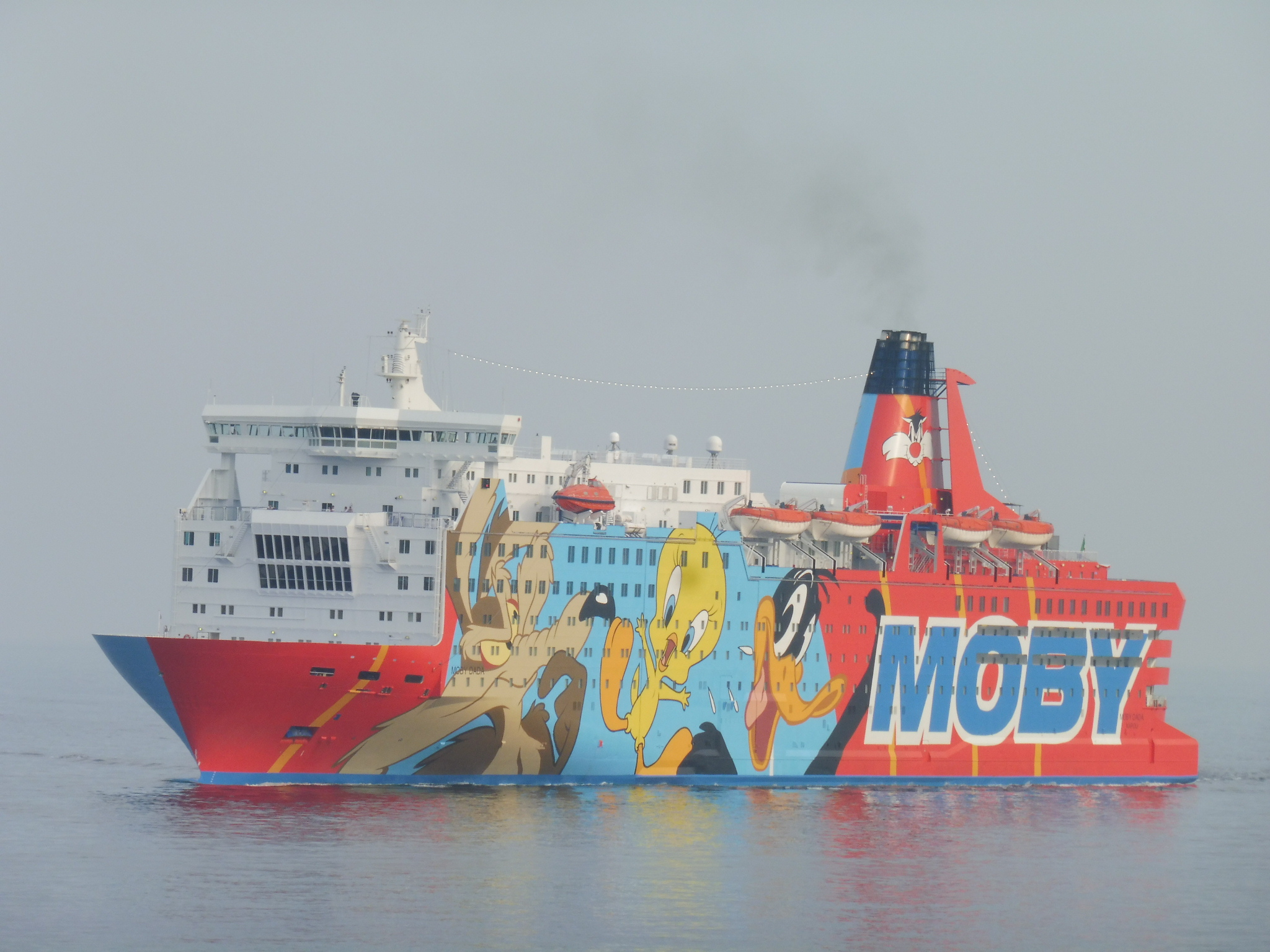
- Moby Dada arriving at Nice from Bastia, June 2017.

History
- Name: 1981–1990: Finlandia; 1990–2010: Queen of Scandinavia; 2010–2016: Princess Maria; 2016–onwards: Moby Dada
- Owner: 1981–1988: Effoa; 1988–1990: Suomen Yritysrahoitus; 1990-2010: DFDS Seaways; 2010-2016: St. Peter Line; 2016-onwards: Moby S.p.A.
- Operator: 1981–1990: Effoa; 1990–2008: DFDS Seaways; 2010–2016: St. Peter Line; 2016–onwards: Moby Lines
- Port of registry: 1981–1990: Helsinki, Finland; 1990–2010: Copenhagen, Denmark; 2010–2016: Valletta, Malta; 2016–onwards: Naples, Italy
- Builder: Oy Wärtsilä Ab Perno shipyard and Turku Shipyard, Finland
- Yard number: 1251
- Laid down: 18 February 1980
- Launched: 25 July 1980
- Christened: 30 March 1981 by Tellervo Koivisto
- Acquired: 30 March 1981
- In service: 13 April 1981
- Out of service: 4 June 2025
- Identification: Call sign: 9HA2374; IMO number: 7911533; MMSI number: 248463000
- Fate: 2025: Sold for scrap in Aliağa, Turkey
- Notes: Sister ship to Stena Saga

General characteristics (as built)
- Tonnage: 25,905 GRT; 3,898 DWT
- Length: 166.10 m (544.95 ft)
- Beam: 28.46 m (93.37 ft)
- Draught: 6.70 m (21.98 ft)
- Ice class: 1 A Super
- Propulsion: 4 × Wärtsilä–S.E.M.T. Pielstick 12PC2.5V; 22,948 kW (combined)
- Speed: 22 knots (41 km/h; 25 mph)
- Capacity: 1,676 passengers; 1,601 passenger berths; 450 cars

General characteristics (currently)
- Tonnage: 33,575 GT; 3,898 DWT
- Capacity: 1,760 passengers; 1,650 passenger berths; 305 cars
- Notes: Otherwise same as built

Moby Dada was a cruiseferry operated by Moby Lines. She was built in 1981 as Finlandia for Effoa at Wärtsilä's Perno shipyard in Turku, Finland, and placed in service on Silja Line's Helsinki—Stockholm service. In 1990 she was sold to DFDS Seaways and renamed Queen of Scandinavia. From 2010 until 2016, she operated under the name of Princess Maria for St. Peter Line between Helsinki and St. Petersburg, Russia.

In 2016, following the purchase of St. Peter Line by Moby Lines, Princess Maria was renamed Moby Dada and was transferred to the Italian registry in November 2016, before being transferred to Moby Lines' operations on the Mediterranean Sea.

On 13 March 2025, the sale for scrapping to the Aliağa Ship Breaking Yard was announced.

== Service history ==
=== 1981–1990: Finlandia ===
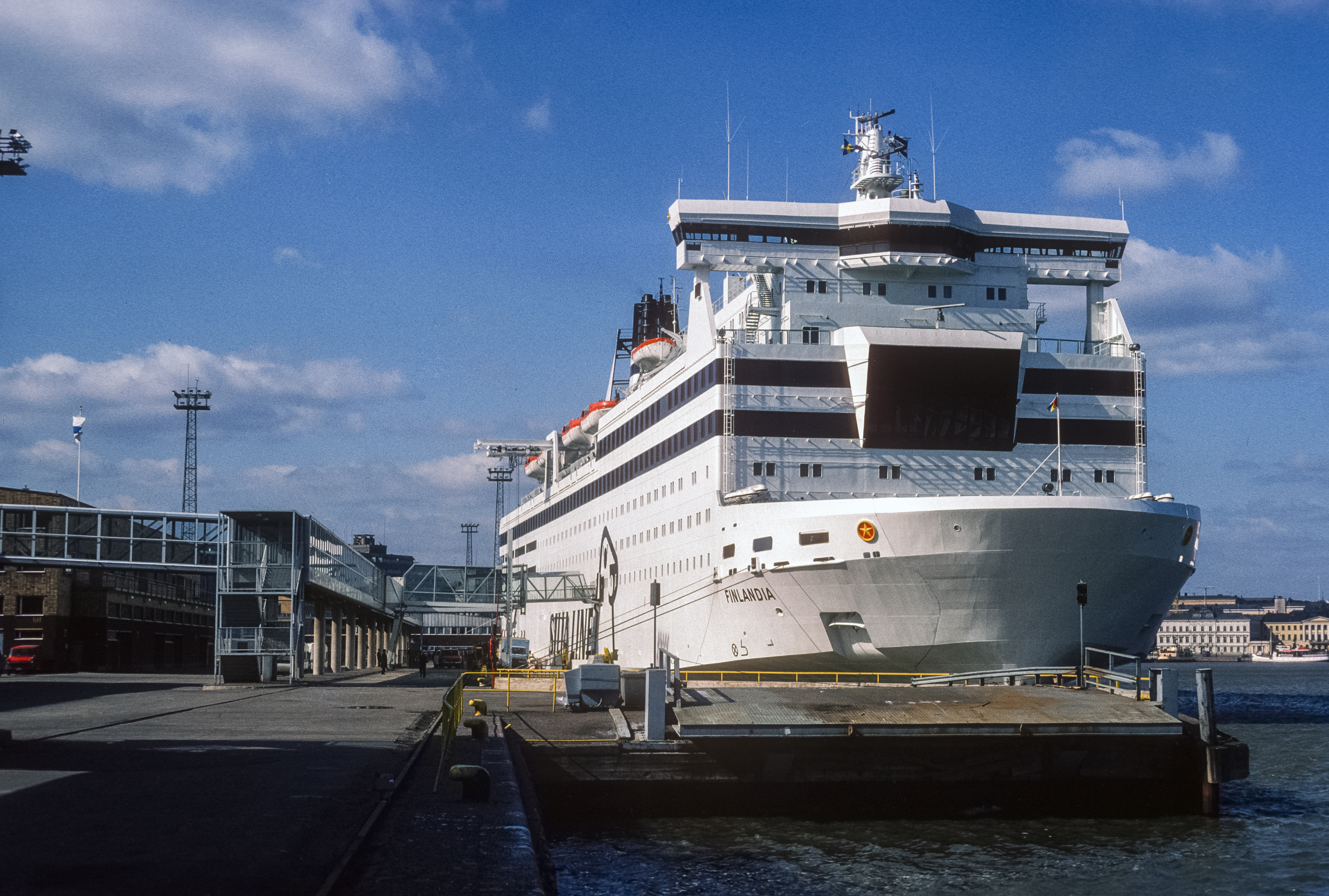
Finlandia in Helsinki harbour in 1981 with original bow

Originally to be named Skandia, Finlandia was the first large, modern cruiseferry to be built for Silja Line. At the time she was also the world's largest cruiseferry in terms of passenger capacity, beds and volume. Alongside her sister Silvia Regina (and Viking Line's contemporary Viking Saga and Viking Song) she was instrumental in changing the Helsinki-Stockholm route from a transportation service into a cruise route.

Finlandia and Silvia Regina were originally constructed with very 'fat', curving bows to maximise car-carrying capacity, but these made the ship extremely difficult to handle especially during the winter. As a result, the Finlandia was docked in January 1982 (after just eight months of service) in Wärtsilä's Perno shipyard for reconstruction of her bow to a sleeker form. Following the bow reconstruction, additional rebuilding was done at Wärtsilä's Turku shipyard, where additional cabins were built and repairs were carried out on the restaurants.

During her career for Silja Line the Finlandia enjoyed a special relationship with Mauno Koivisto, who was at the time the Prime Minister and later President of Finland. Finlandia was named by Koivisto's wife Tellervo Koivisto in 1981 and the pair travelled on Finlandia twice while Koivisto was president, first in 1984 on Wärtsilä's 150th-anniversary and again in 1985 when the pair made an official visit to Sweden.

In 1985, Finlandia's interiors were heavily rebuilt at Wärtsilä's Helsinki shipyard.

In September 1988, Finlandia was sold to Suomen Yritysrahoitus in order to raise funds for new ships for the Helsinki–Stockholm route. Suomen Yritysrahoitus then chartered the ship back to Effoa for 1 1/2 years. In December 1989, Suomen Yritysrahoitus sold Finlandia to DFDS for delivery in May 1990, which was the planned delivery date for Finlandia's replacement Silja Serenade. However, due to the bankruptcy of Wärtsilä's shipbuilding division the Silja Serenade was delayed by several months. DFDS took delivery of the Finlandia as agreed in May 1990 and EffJohn (merger of Effoa and Johnson Line born in early 1990) was forced to look for a solution for its ship shortage elsewhere.

=== 1990–2010: Queen of Scandinavia ===
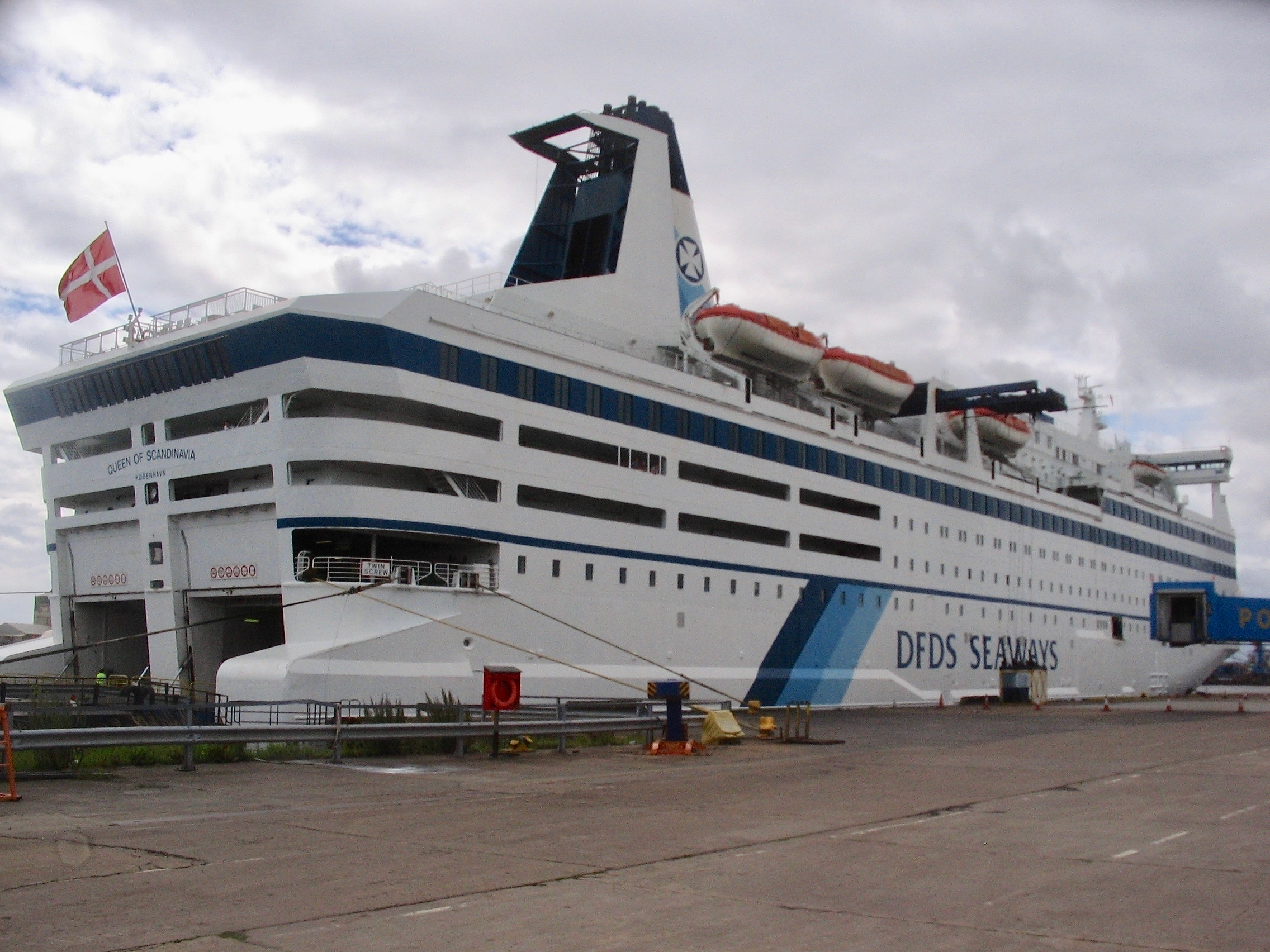
Queen of Scandinavia in Newcastle in 2008.

On 6 May 1990, Finlandia made her last call at Stockholm and left for docking at Cityvarvet], Gothenburg in preparation for her new service. Five days later she received her new name, Queen of Scandinavia. In June 1990 she began service on DFDS's Copenhagen—Helsingborg—Oslo route, initially as the pair of King of Scandinavia, originally Wellamo of Effoa, the ship that Finlandia had replaced on the Helsinki—Stockholm service.

In January–April 2000, Queen of Scandinavia was rebuilt by Remontowa in Gdynia, Poland, with rear sponsons and, again, a new sleeker bow. The new bow is especially notable due to the fact that it has no gate or visor, hence the ship's car decks can now only be loaded/unloaded from the rear. Also, a new marine evacuation system was added on deck 9. All the other life rafts were removed, and the new evacuation system features a chute instead.

In June 2001, Queen of Scandinavia was replaced on the Copenhagen—Oslo service by Pearl of Scandinavia, and she was moved to the Newcastle—IJmuiden route. In September 2002, while sailing to IJmuiden, a woman fell overboard from one of the upper decks in the early hours of the morning. A lifeboat was quickly launched from the ship, while Yarmouth coastguard and other ships assisted in the search. After 7 hours of searching Queen of Scandinavia continued to IJmuiden and left the coastguard to continue the search, without success. The woman had very little chance of survival due to the height of the fall and the low temperature of the water.

In May 2007, Queen of Scandinavia swapped routes with Princess of Norway, taking over the Newcastle—Stavanger—Haugesund—Bergen route. This allowed DFDS to operate two sister ships, Princess of Norway and the third King of Scandinavia on the Newcastle—IJmuiden run. On 26 November 2007 while in the port of Bergen, the Queen of Scandinavia broke her forward moorings and collided with the expedition ship H.U. Sverdrup II. The H.U. Sverdrup II was severely damaged, while the Queen of Scandinavia received only cosmetic damage and was able to depart for Newcastle in accordance with her normal timetable.

DFDS Seaways closed down the loss-making United Kingdom—Norway service with the Queen of Scandinavia making her final sailing on 1 September 2008. Following this Queen of Scandinavia sailed to Korsør where she would stay until being either chartered or sold.

In February 2009, Queen of Scandinavia was chartered to Alstom and moved to the harbour of Oskarshamn in Sweden for use as living quarters for some 800 workers involved in the upgrading reactor 3 of the Oskarshamn Nuclear Power Plant. While at Oskarshamn on 16 April 2009 a fire started in the ship's engine room at around 11 PM CEST. According to preliminary reports, all 238 people on board were safely evacuated, and the fire was put out by 0:30 AM. Precise reasons for the fire are unknown as of 17 April 2009. The fire damaged the ship's auxiliary engines.

On 12 May 2009, DFDS reported they had agreed to sell Queen of Scandinavia to a new Finland-based company Nordic Sea Line, with a delivery date set for June 2009. Nordic Sea Line planned on using the ship as a floating hotel and conference centre around Northern Europe. However, the sale was cancelled as Nordic Sea Line failed to make the initial payment that was due on 15 May 2009.

After the end of the accommodation ship contract in Oskarshamn Queen of Scandinavia was moved to Klaipėda, Lithuania, for further lay-up. From December 2009, the ship was chartered to the Danish police as an accommodation ship in Copenhagen.

=== 2010–2016: Princess Maria ===
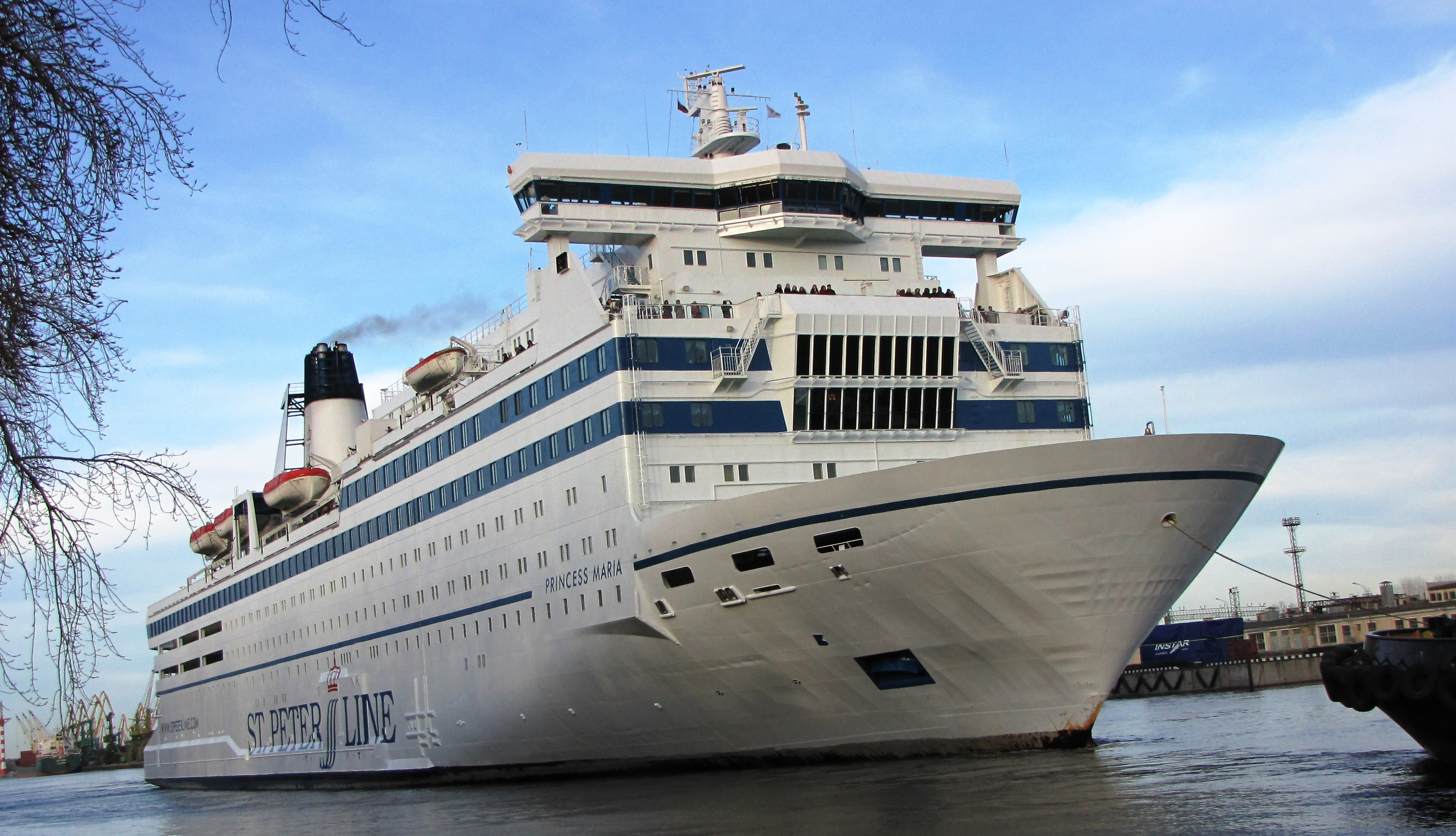
Princess Maria with St. Peter Line

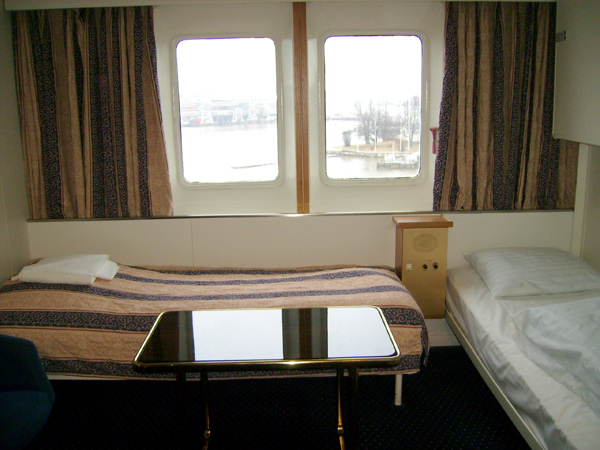
Cabin Class A on board Princess Maria

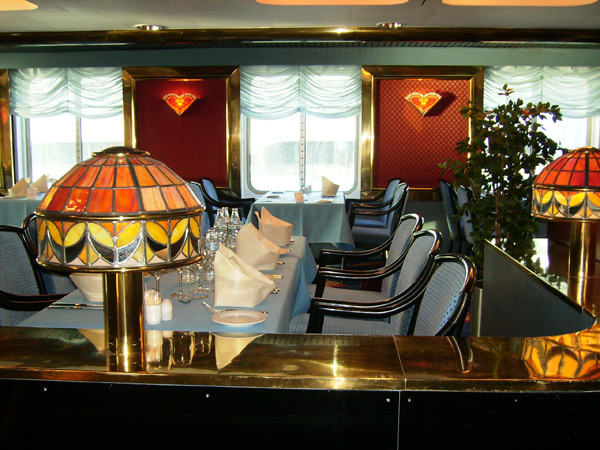
A restaurant on board Princess Maria

In early 2010, Queen of Scandinavia was chartered to St. Peter Line for use on a new route operated by the company between St. Petersburg and Helsinki. She was renamed Princess Maria, re-registered to Malta and entered service on 21 April.

In February 2014, Princess Maria was used as floating hotel during the Winter Olympics in Sochi, along with the second passenger ferry of St. Peter Line, SPL Princess Anastasia, which passed through the Strait of Gibraltar on 16 January 2014.

=== 2016–2025: Moby Dada ===
In 2016, Moby Lines acquired shares in St. Peter Line, with the intention of moving Princess Maria to Moby's operations in the Mediterranean Sea, with Princess Anastasia remaining with St. Peter Line. On 8 November 2016 she completed her last sailing for St Peter Line and two days later was renamed Moby Dada and brought under the Italian flag of registry whilst docked in St Petersburg, Russia. As of June 2017, Moby Dada is operating between the French port of Nice and Bastia, Corsica. She is painted in a multicoloured livery featuring Looney Tunes characters, with the hull painted predominately red on the port side, and predominantly blue on the starboard side.

In September 2017 Moby Lines accepted an agreement with the Spanish Ministry of Home Affairs (Ministerio del Interior), for the purpose to lodge Spanish police officers in case the government were directed to intervene in the announced independence referendum in Catalonia on 1 October 2017. The Moby Dada was laid up in the Port of Barcelona as an accommodation service to the around 1000 police officers that had been ordered to participate in the government intervention in the elections.

On 4 June 2025 the ship was beached in Aliağaa for scrapping.

Preceded by GTS Finnjet	World's Largest Cruiseferry; 1981–1982; With: MS Silvia Regina (1981–1982)	Succeeded by MS Scandinavia
