= MV Saga =

Swedish cruiseferry

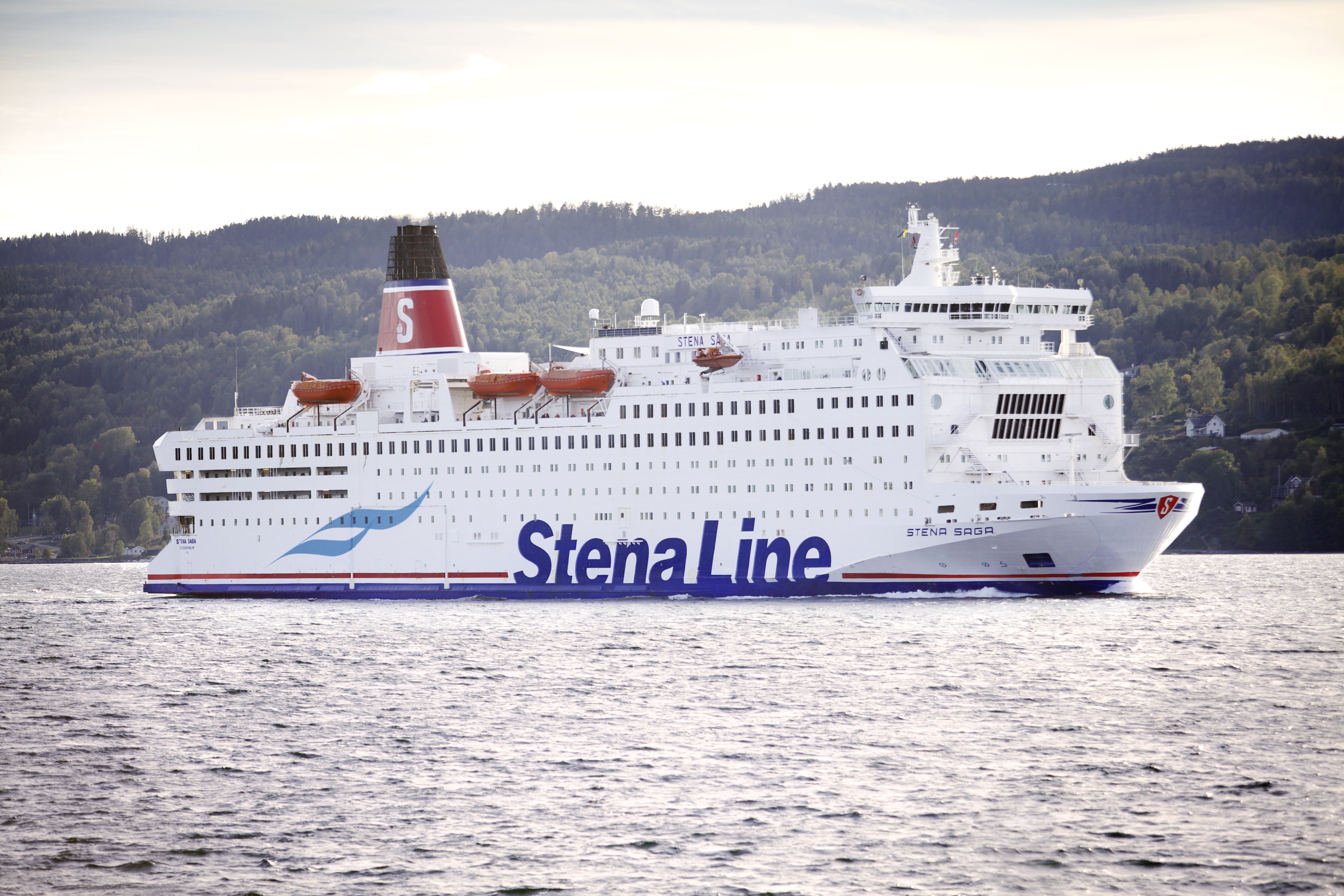
- Stena Saga in September 2014

History
- Name: 1981–1991: Silvia Regina; 1991–1994: Stena Britannica; 1994–2021: Stena Saga; 2021–2025: Saga; 2025-present: Saga X
- Owner: 1981–1986: Suomen Yritysrahoitus; 1986–1988: Johnson Line; 1988 onwards: Stena Line
- Operator: 1981–1991: Silja Line; 1991–2021: Stena Line; 2021–2021: Adria Ferries
- Port of registry: 1981–1983: Helsinki, Finland; 1983–1987: Mariehamn, Finland; 1987-2020: Stockholm, Sweden; 2020–present: Limassol,Cyprus
- Builder: Wärtsilä Perno shipyard/Turku shipyard, Turku, Finland
- Yard number: 1252
- Launched: 21 October 1980
- Christened: 28 April 1981 (by Queen Silvia of Sweden)
- Acquired: 10 June 1981
- In service: 12 June 1981
- Identification: IMO number: 7911545
- Status: Laid up

General characteristics (as built)
- Type: Cruiseferry
- Tonnage: 25,905 GRT; 3,898 DWT
- Length: 166.10 m (544 ft 11 in)
- Beam: 28.46 m (93 ft 4 in)
- Draught: 6.70 m (22 ft 0 in)
- Ice class: 1 A Super
- Installed power: 4 × Wärtsilä-Pielstick 12PC2.5V; 22,948 kW (combined)
- Speed: 22 knots (41 km/h; 25 mph)
- Capacity: 2,000 passengers; 1601 berths; 450 cars; 70 trailers

General characteristics (as rebuilt, 2005)
- Tonnage: 33,750 GT
- Capacity: 2,000 passengers; 1601 berths; 510 cars; 1032 lanemeters

MV Saga is a cruiseferry owned by the Swedish shipping company Stena Line which it operated mainly on their route connecting Oslo, Norway to Frederikshavn, Denmark until March 2020, when that route was closed down. She was built as MS Silvia Regina in 1981 by Wärtsilä in Turku, Finland, for Rederi AB Svea for use in Silja Line traffic. The ship joined the Stena Line fleet in 1991, originally with the name MS Stena Britannica.

== Concept and construction ==
In the late 1970s, Effoa and Rederi AB Svea, two of the owners of the Baltic Sea ferry operator Silja Line, made the decision to order two new, large car/passenger ferries for Silja Line's Helsinki–Stockholm service. The ships were designed to be much larger than the ships that were at the time sailing on the route (built in 1975) and they would be Silja Line's first genuine cruiseferries.

During the 70s the French Dubegion-Normandie shipyard in Nantes had been Silja Line's shipyard of choice, with both previous generations of ferries for the Helsinki–Stockholm service built there. However, for the new ships, the decision was made to build them in Finland at Wärtsilä Turku shipyards, that was at the time building several large ferries for Silja's main rival Viking Line.

Externally the new ships were quite typical ferries of the early 1980s, with large boxlike superstructures. An unusual feature on the ships was a two-deck high panorama window on the front of the superstructure, offering views over the ship's bow.

On 21 October 1980, the second of Silja's new ships was launched at Wärtsilä's Perno shipyard. Subsequently, she was towed to Wärtsilä's Turku shipyard where the construction was finished. On 28 April 1981 the ship was named MS Silvia Regina by HM Queen Silvia of Sweden. Twelve days later the ship left on a two-day trial voyage, and on 10 June 1981 she was delivered to her new owners. Instead of being delivered directly to Rederi AB Svea, the ship's new owners were Suomen Yritysrahoitus, who chartered the ship immediately to Svea Line (Finland). Due to this arrangement the ship was registered in Helsinki and not Stockholm, the usual homeport of Rederi AB Svea's ships.

== Service history ==
=== 1981–1991: Silvia Regina ===
On 12 June 1981, the brand new Silvia Regina was set in Silja Line's Helsinki–Stockholm service, joining her sister MS Finlandia that had been completed some four months earlier. The ship carried Rederi AB Svea funnel colours for only a few months, as the company was absorbed into its parent company Johnson Line in the end of 1982. As a result, the Silvia Regina had received Johnson Line's blue/yellow funnel colours already before the refit. Soon after entering service a major design flaw was discovered in the ships. In order to maximise car carrying capacity, they had been designed with very wide bows that made the ships very difficult to control, especially in poor weather conditions. As a result, both ships were docked at Wärtsilä's Perno shipyard during the winter 1981–82 and rebuilt with new bows that were notably sleeker along the waterline. The Silvia Regina was docked for bow reconstruction from 13 January onwards. After this was completed, she was again taken to Wärtsilä's Turku shipyard where new cabins were built and repairs were carried on in the ship's restaurants. Following completion of the reconstruction the ship re-entered service in Turku on 3 February, from where she made a crossing to Stockholm, after which she continued on her normal traffic.

In 1984, the ship's homeport was changed from Helsinki to Mariehamn. On 21 March 1985 while outside Helsinki the ship's rear on top of the heavy sea ice during a turn, as a result of which the ship listed slightly and a truck trailer overturned on a second truck on the cardeck. There were no other casualties and the ship was able to continue sailing normally. There was a more serious threat to the ship made on 17 August 1986 when a bomb threat was made against the ship in Stockholm. The passengers and crew were evacuated, and to ensure passenger safety they were taken to Turku onboard MS Svea instead of sailing to Helsinki as planned. Later the Silvia Regina departed Stockholm without passengers and resumed normal traffic in Helsinki the following day.

In January 1987, Johnson Line purchased the Silvia Regina from Suomen Yritysrahoitus with the cost of 189,862,839 Finnish markka, and moved her under Swedish flag. However the following year Johnson Line sold the ship to Stena Line who chartered her back to Johnson Line until Silja Line's new Helsinki–Stockholm ships (then still in planning stages) were completed. In the end the new ships were severely delayed, and it was not until the end of May 1991 that the ship stopped sailing for Silja Line. For the last months of her service with Silja she received Silja Line's new funnel colours, with the blue seal that had up until that point been painted to the side of the ship next to the name moved to the funnel.

=== 1991–1994: Stena Britannica ===
After the end of her service with Silja the Silvia Regina sailed from Stockholm to Bremerhaven, Germany where she was taken over by Stena Line on 2 June 1991, and subsequently rebuilt for her new service at Schichau Seebeckswerft AG. During docking the ship was renamed MS Stena Britannica, and on 19 June she entered service on Stena Line's Hook of Holland – Harwich service.

=== 1994-2020: Stena Saga ===
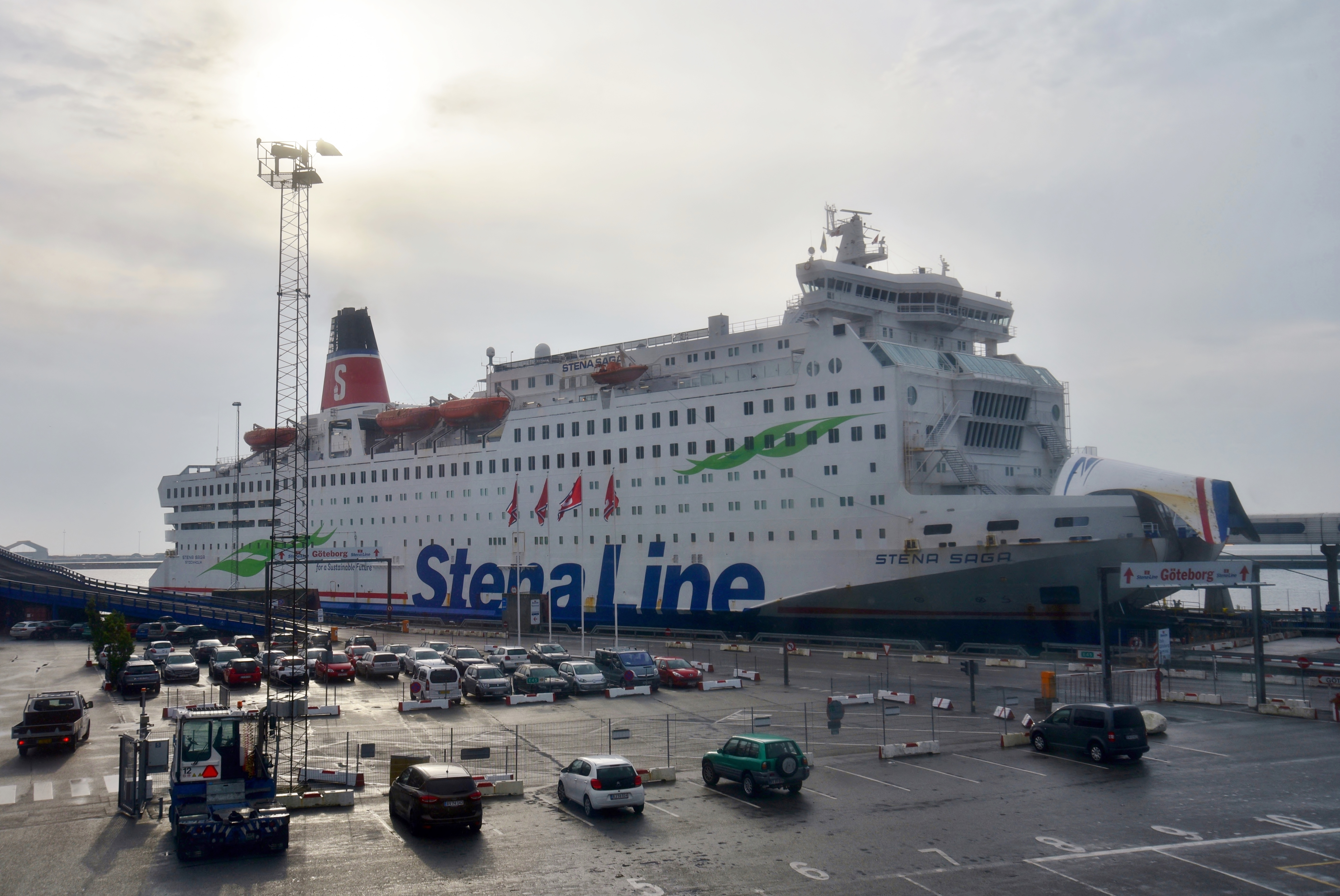
MS Stena Saga in Fredrikshavn, 2019.

The ship was not economical to use on the Hook of Holland – Harwich route, and in March 1994 she was moved to the Oslo–Fredrikshavn route, taking over the route and, confusingly, the name of MS Stena Saga, which in turn took over the Hook of Holland – Harwich route. Initially during winter months the route was extended to Oslo–Fredrikshavn–Gothenburg.

On 9 August 1995, while en route from Fredrikshavn to Oslo the ship's engines stalled for two hours, during which she lay at anchor to stop the ship drifting towards land. In January 2000 the ship was rebuilt at Götaverken Cityvarvet, Gothenburg with amongst other things rear sponsons added. In August 2000 the ship stopped taking passenger cars onboard on the Fredrikshavn–Gothenburg portion of the route. For the weekend 12–13 May 2001 the ship was chartered to a music festival in Copenhagen.

Between December 2002 and January 2003 the ship was again rebuilt at Cityvarvet. In June 2003 the ship was chartered to the Norwegian football union for a cruise from Oslo to Copenhagen. On 14 June 2005, after departing Frederikshavn for Oslo the smoke detector in one of the generator rooms gave an alarm, and the ship returned to Frederikshavn. Following this, she was kept off service for a week. Between December 2005 and January 2006 the ship was once again rebuilt at Cityvarvet. In early 2008 she was docked at Cityvarvet once again. During this docking the large "spoiler" was removed from the funnel, reportedly to improve stability, while altering the ship's appearance and causing some dismay from ship enthusiasts in the Nordic countries.

=== 2020 onwards: Saga ===
In March 2020, Stena Line announced that it would withdraw the vessel from the Oslo-Fredrikshavn route and terminate the route, citing lack of traffic and missing the important summer season due to the Coronavirus border closures as the main reason. She was renamed Saga and laid up in the port of Uddevalla for almost a year.

On 16 June 2021, Saga left Sweden for two-month charter to Adria Ferries on their Ancona-Durrës route.

In November 2021, Saga was reported bound for the Philippines, on charter to Bridgemans Services, after conversion to a floating hotel vessel.

Preceded by MS Finlandia	World's Largest Cruiseferry; 1981–1982; With: MS Finlandia (1981–1982)	Succeeded by MS Scandinavia
