= St. Peter Line =

Russian shipping line

- Company type: Private
- Industry: Water transport
- Founded: 2010; 2016 as Moby SPL Limited
- Defunct: 2026 (officially)
- Headquarters: Valletta, Malta
- Areas served: Estonia, Finland, Sweden, Russia
- Services: Ferries; Port services Passenger transportation Freight transportation
- Owner: Moby SPL Limited
- Website: stpeterline.com/en

Route map

St. Peter Line was a water transport company owned by Moby SPL Limited, a Maltese-registered shipping company, which operated services from Helsinki, St. Petersburg, Stockholm and Tallinn. The company was founded in 2010 with it starting operations in April of that year. In December 2010, St. Peter Line acquired the cruiseferry named Pride of Bilbao from Irish Continental Group for €37.7m for a new route between St Petersburg and Stockholm. Limited passenger services were run in 2018, but most of the 2019 programme was cancelled. With the start of the Coronavirus pandemic, the company's only vessel was assigned to special duties in the Kola River in Russia's Murmansk Oblast, providing emergency floating accommodation for workers in an area badly affected by COVID-19. In 2022 the ship was withdrawn because of the Russian invasion of Ukraine, transferred to Moby Lines and sailed to Messina for refurbishment. She was set to return to service in the Mediterranean. The company was removed from the Finnish Trade Register during March and May 2026. It was removed from Finnish Employer Register in 31st July 2023.

== Routes ==
St. Peter Line operated two routes across the Gulf of Finland.

Route	Frequency	Crossing time
Helsinki – St. Petersburg – Helsinki	2 crossings per week	14 hours
Stockholm – (Helsinki) – St Petersburg – (Tallinn) – Stockholm	1 crossing per week	38 hours

== Fleet ==
=== Former vessels ===
Ship	Built	In service	Tonnage^{1}	Status as of 2021
SPL Princess Anastasia	1986	2011-2022	37,799 GT	Now MS Moby Orli with Moby Lines
MS Princess Maria	1981	2010–2016	25,905 GT	Scrapped in 2025.
