= MS Svea =

MS Svea may refer to the following motor ships:

- MS Svea (1966), a ferry operated by Rederi AB Svea 1966–1969
- Mega Smeralda a cruiseferry operated by Silja Line as Svea 1985–1992
