= Moby Orli =

Cruiseferry built in 1986

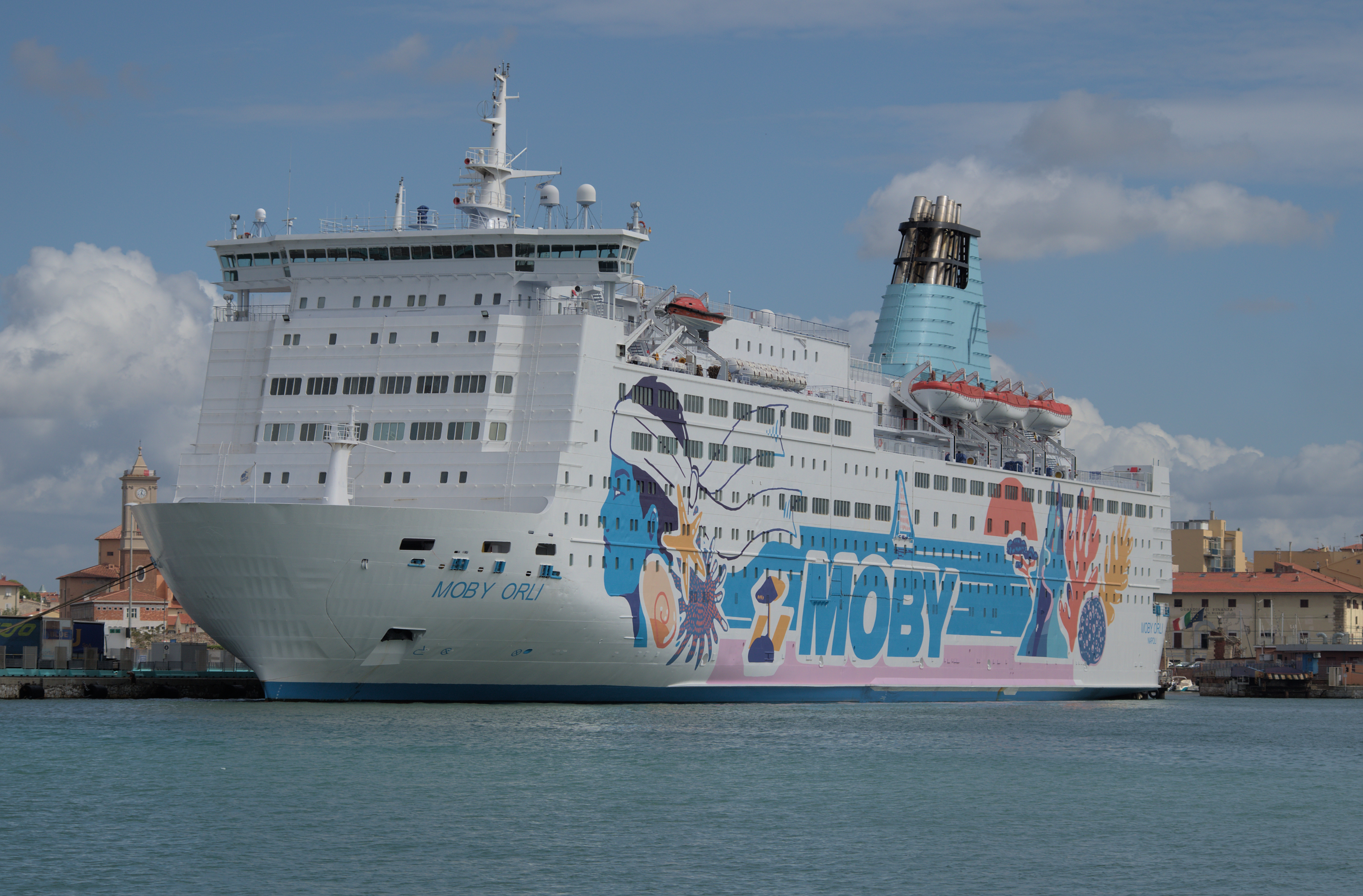
- Moby Orli in Livorno

History
- Name: 1986–1993: Olympia; 1993–2010: Pride of Bilbao; 8–12/2010: Bilbao; 2011-2023: Princess Anastasia; 2023−Present: Moby Orli
- Owner: 1986–1993: Rederi AB Slite; 1993–2010: Irish Continental Group; 2010–2013: St. Peter Line; 2013–2017: Zatarga Ltd; 2017 onwards: SPL Princess Anastasia Ltd
- Operator: 1986–1993: Rederi AB Slite (in Viking Line traffic); 1993–2010: P&O Ferries; 2010–2017: St. Peter Line RUS; 2017 onwards: Moby SPA
- Port of registry: 1986–1993: Slite, Sweden; 1993–1994: Nassau, Bahamas; 1994–2008: Portsmouth, United Kingdom; 2008–2010: Nassau, Bahamas; 2010–2011: Limassol, Cyprus; 2011–2017: Valletta, Malta; 2017 onwards: Naples, Italy
- Route: Genoa - Bastia
- Builder: Wärtsilä Perno Shipyard, Turku, Finland
- Yard number: 1290
- Laid down: 1 April 1985
- Launched: 31 August 1985
- Completed: 18 April 1986
- Acquired: 26 April 1986
- In service: 29 April 1986
- Identification: Call sign: IBRS; IMO number: 8414582; MMSI number: 247385600
- Status: In service

General characteristics (as built)
- Type: Cruiseferry
- Tonnage: 37,799 GT; 3,420 DWT
- Length: 177.10 m (581 ft 0 in)
- Beam: 28.40 m (93 ft 2 in)
- Draught: 6.51 m (21 ft 4 in)
- Decks: 11
- Installed power: 4 × Wärtsilä-SEMT Pielstick 12PC2-6V; 23,000 kW (31,000 hp) (combined)
- Speed: 22 knots (41 km/h; 25 mph)
- Capacity: 2,500 passengers; 2,447 berths; 580 cars; 1,115 lanemeters

Moby Orli is a cruiseferry owned by Moby SPA. Until September 2010, she was known as Pride of Bilbao, operated by P&O Ferries on their Portsmouth–Bilbao route. The vessel was built in 1986 as Olympia at the Wärtsilä Perno Shipyard in Turku, Finland for Rederi AB Slite, Sweden for use in Viking Line traffic. She was sold by Irish Continental Group to St. Peter Line in December 2010 and renamed Princess Anastasia and operated on the Saint Petersburg – Helsinki – Stockholm – Tallinn route. In 2022 she was withdrawn because of the Russian invasion of Ukraine, transferred to Moby Lines and sailed to Messina for refurbishment. She was set to return to service in the Mediterranean.

== Career ==
=== Rederi AB Slite ===
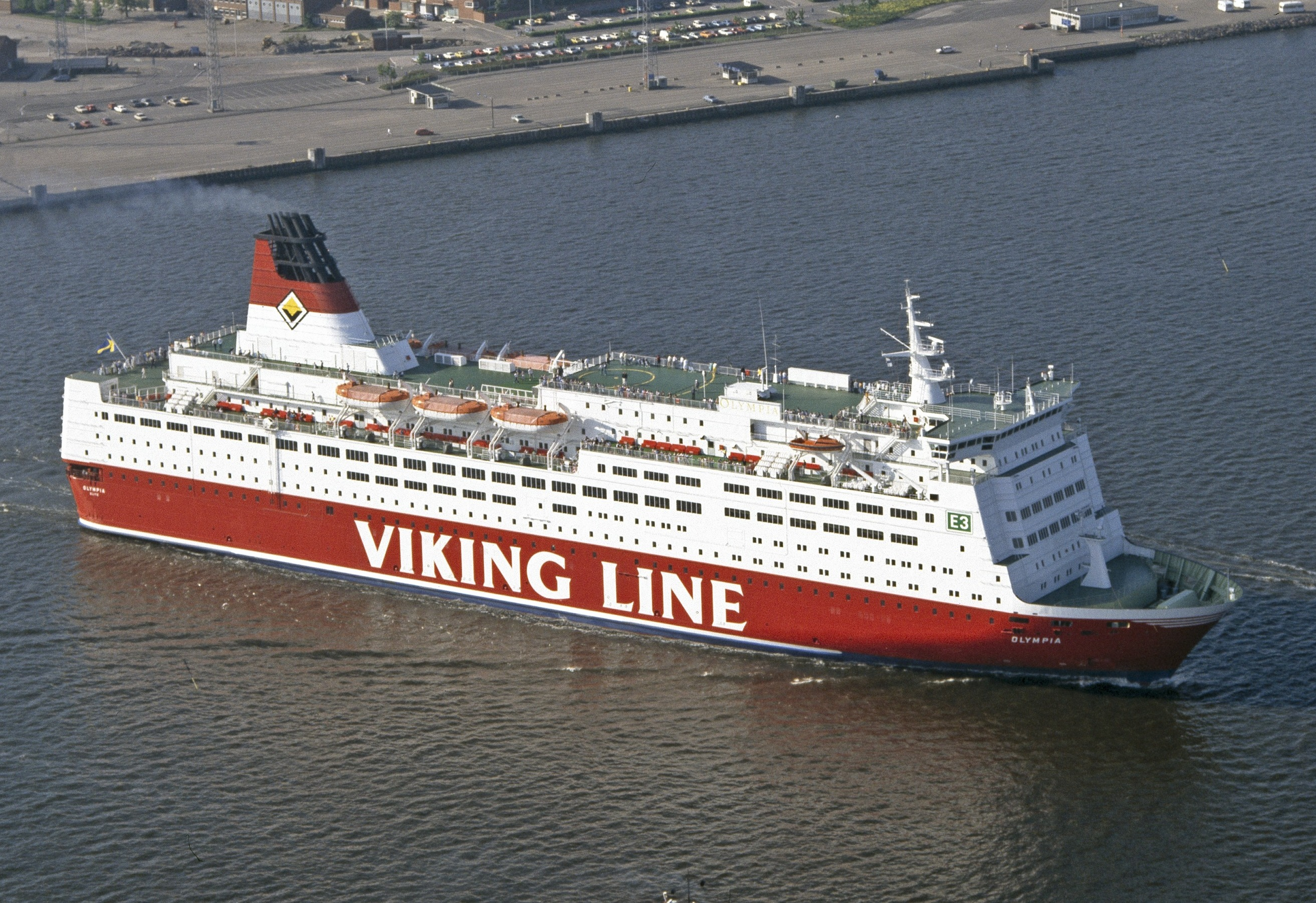
MS Olympia in 1986

Olympia was built at the Wärtsilä Perno Shipyard in Turku, Finland, for Rederi AB Slite. The ship was launched on 26 April 1986, and operated between Stockholm and Helsinki for Viking Line. Olympia was built as a sister ship to MS Mariella.

In 1993 Rederi AB Slite suffered financial problems and was forced to declare bankruptcy. Olympia was sold to Irish Continental Group and chartered to P&O European Ferries who renamed her the Pride of Bilbao.

=== P&O European Ferries ===
Pride of Bilbao operated between Portsmouth and Bilbao between 1993 and 2010, completing one return sailing every three days before this route was closed in September 2010. She had been previously used to provide a weekly service between Portsmouth and Cherbourg.

In 2002 she received a major refurbishment, during which the vast majority of public spaces were updated and brought in line with P&O Ferries' new corporate branding of onboard facilities, as well as updating her livery.

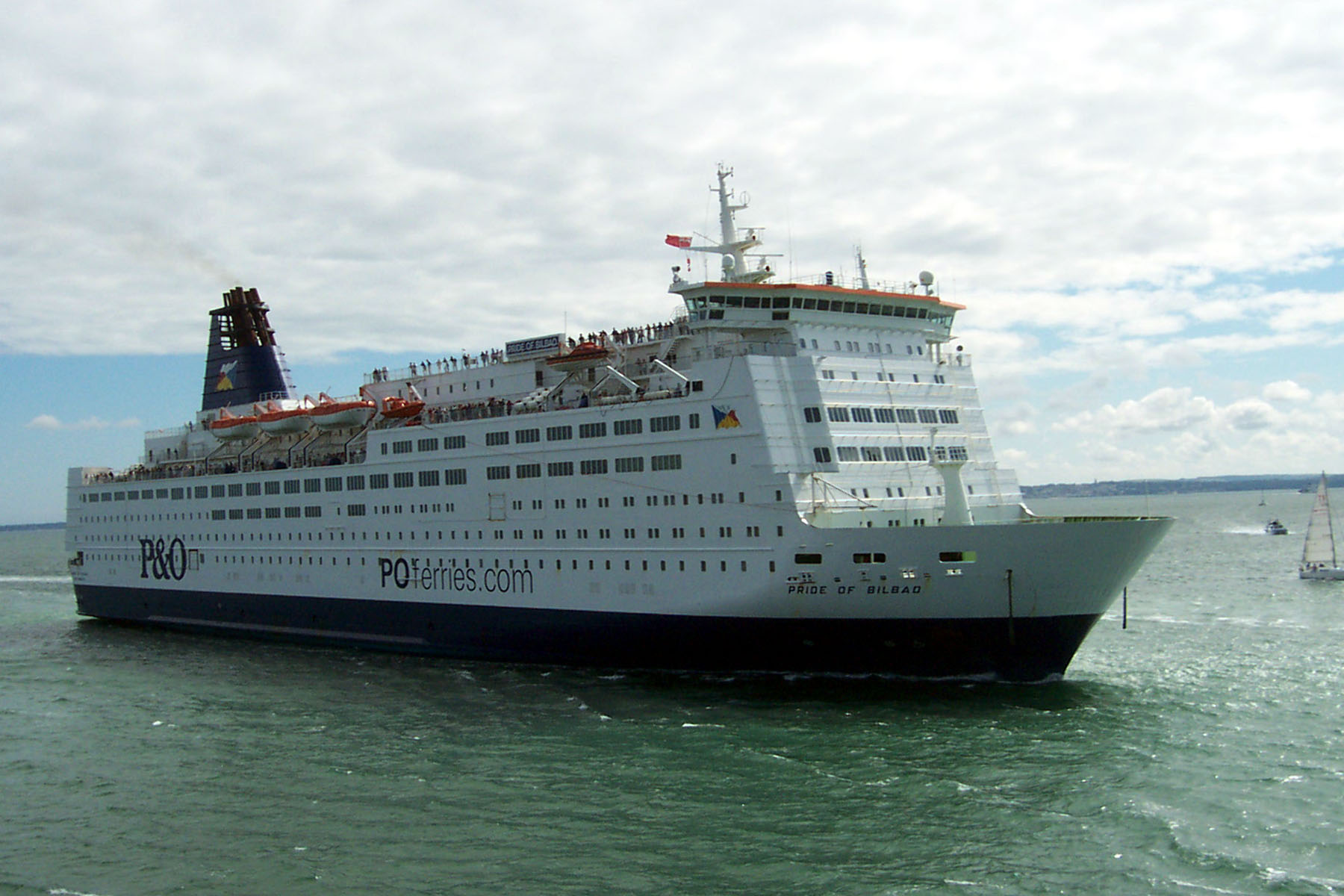
Pride of Bilbao entering Portsmouth Harbour

From 2006 Pride of Bilbao was the only P&O Ferries ship to operate from Portsmouth, completing one return sailing every three days. The company, in an attempt to encourage more passengers, marketed Mini Cruises with passengers walking on to the ship without a car. When the ship arrived at Bilbao, mini cruise passengers would briefly depart the ship while the ship was prepared for its return trip back to Portsmouth. However, all attempts to make the route profitable for the company were unsuccessful. Mainly because P&O Ferries competitor, Brittany Ferries operated ferries to the nearby port of Santander in 24 hours whereas Pride of Bilbao took 36 hours to reach Bilbao.

On 15 January 2010, P&O ferries announced that the Portsmouth–Bilbao route would be closing, with the last crossing from Bilbao on 27 September 2010, when the lease for MS Pride of Bilbao expired. P&O announced that the route was loss-making and they could not fund a new-build replacement for the vessel. Equally, no other existing ships were available for purchase or charter. Pride of Bilbao completed her last sailing on 28 September 2010.

==== Ouzo sinking ====
Detectives and officers from the Marine Accident Investigation Branch (MAIB) and Hampshire Constabulary investigating the deaths of three yachtsmen examined Pride of Bilbao when it arrived in Portsmouth on 29 August 2006. The ship was one of at least five that the MAIB inspected as part of their investigation. It is thought the ferry either collided with, or had a near-miss, with the 25-foot (8 m) yacht Ouzo off the Isle of Wight on 20 August, leading to the deaths from drowning of all on board. The MAIB and Police inspected the hull for damage and studied paperwork. P&O Ferries had previously handed over information from the ferry's data recorder, which led to the follow-up inspection of the ship. The ship was inspected again on arrival in Portsmouth on 7 September 2006. After offloading passengers and vehicles from Pride of Bilbao, she was turned to allow the MAIB to inspect the port side and stern.

On 20 September 2006 a P&O Ferries employee from Pride of Bilbao was arrested by police on suspicion of causing manslaughter through gross negligence. He was released on bail pending further inquiries, and then re-arrested and charged in February 2007.

The MAIB report into the sinking of Ouzo was released on 12 April 2007. It concluded that the sinking of the yacht was due to Pride of Bilbao colliding with her, or passing so close that she had been swamped or capsized by the vessel's wash.

On 28 October 2007 the trial of Michael Hubble, second mate of Pride of Bilbao, started at Winchester Crown Court in Hampshire. The prosecution alleged that Hubble, in sole charge of the ferry at the time of the alleged incident, failed to act properly in charge of a vessel. He failed to inform the captain of the incident, failed to stop the ferry and failed to launch a search vessel – all actions it is claimed could have saved the lives of the crew of Ouzo. All crew members had life-vests, and at least one of the crew survived for 12 hours after the incident. The defence contended that lights were visible astern of the ferry, encounters with yachts were common, and Ouzo was not the vessel involved in the near miss. Hubble was cleared of manslaughter on 12 December 2007, with the jury accepting the defence case that Ouzo was not the vessel involved. The following day he was also cleared of all charges of misconduct under the Merchant Shipping Act.

==== In popular culture ====
Pride of Bilbao briefly featured in an episode of Only Fools and Horses called Strangers on the Shore which saw Del Boy and Rodney Trotter travel to the village of St. Claire a la Chapelle in northern France to represent Uncle Albert at a naval reunion.

=== St. Peter Line ===
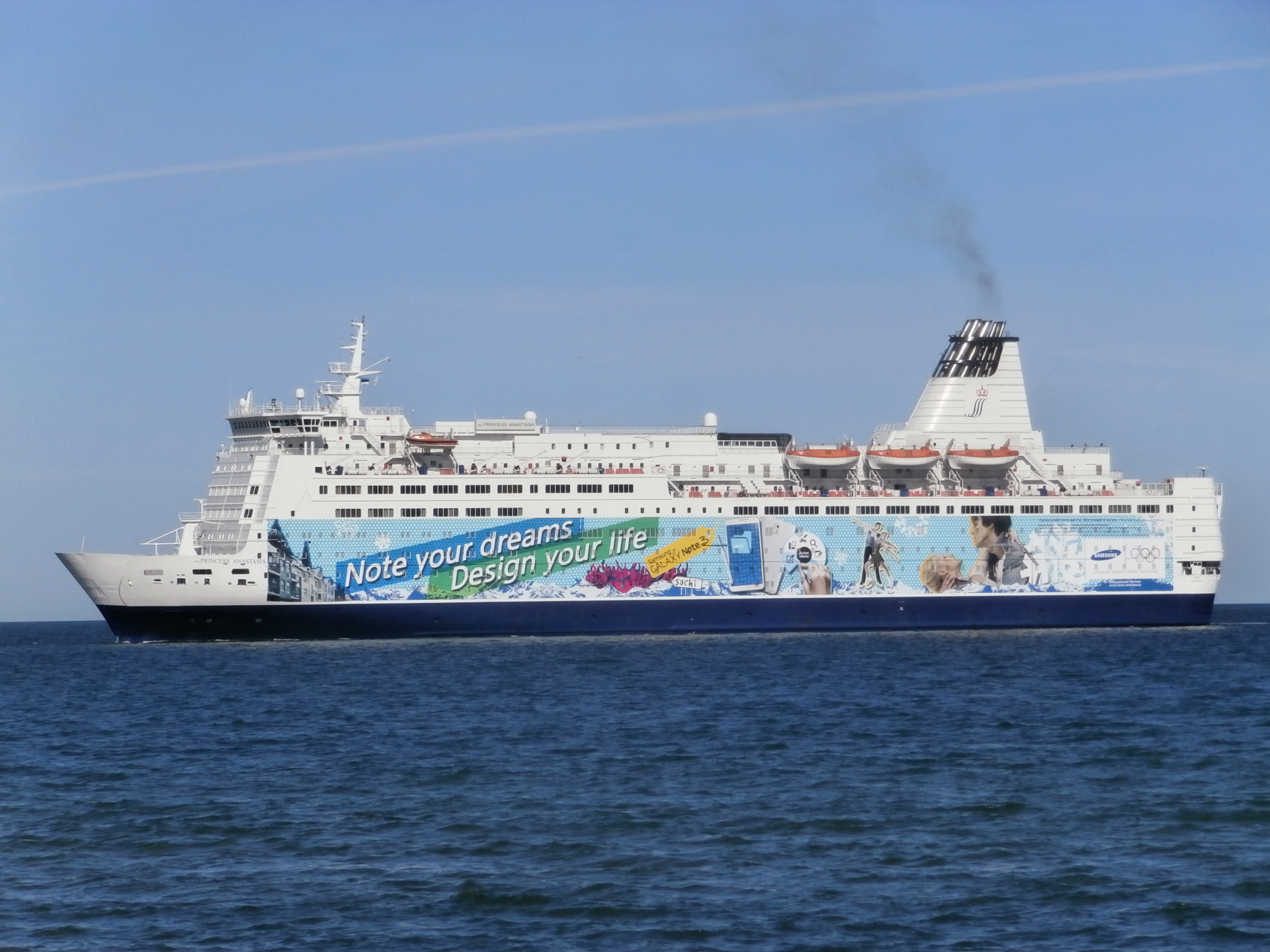
Princess Anastasia arriving at Tallinn harbour

Following the closing of the P&O route Pride of Bilbao was renamed Bilbao in October 2010. The ship left Portsmouth for the last time on 30 September 2010, after all P&O merchandise and other equipment had been removed, and sailed to Falmouth for refurbishment. Whilst at Falmouth in December 2010 Irish Continental Group sold the vessel to St. Peter Line which acquired the ship for a new service between Saint Petersburg and Stockholm, which commenced in May 2011, after the refit of the vessel was completed.

Renamed Princess Anastasia, she left Falmouth just after Christmas 2010 and made her way to Skagen in Norway arriving 31 December 2010 where she anchored off for a couple of days. On 2 January 2011 she made her way through the Baltic Sea to Klaipėda, Lithuania.

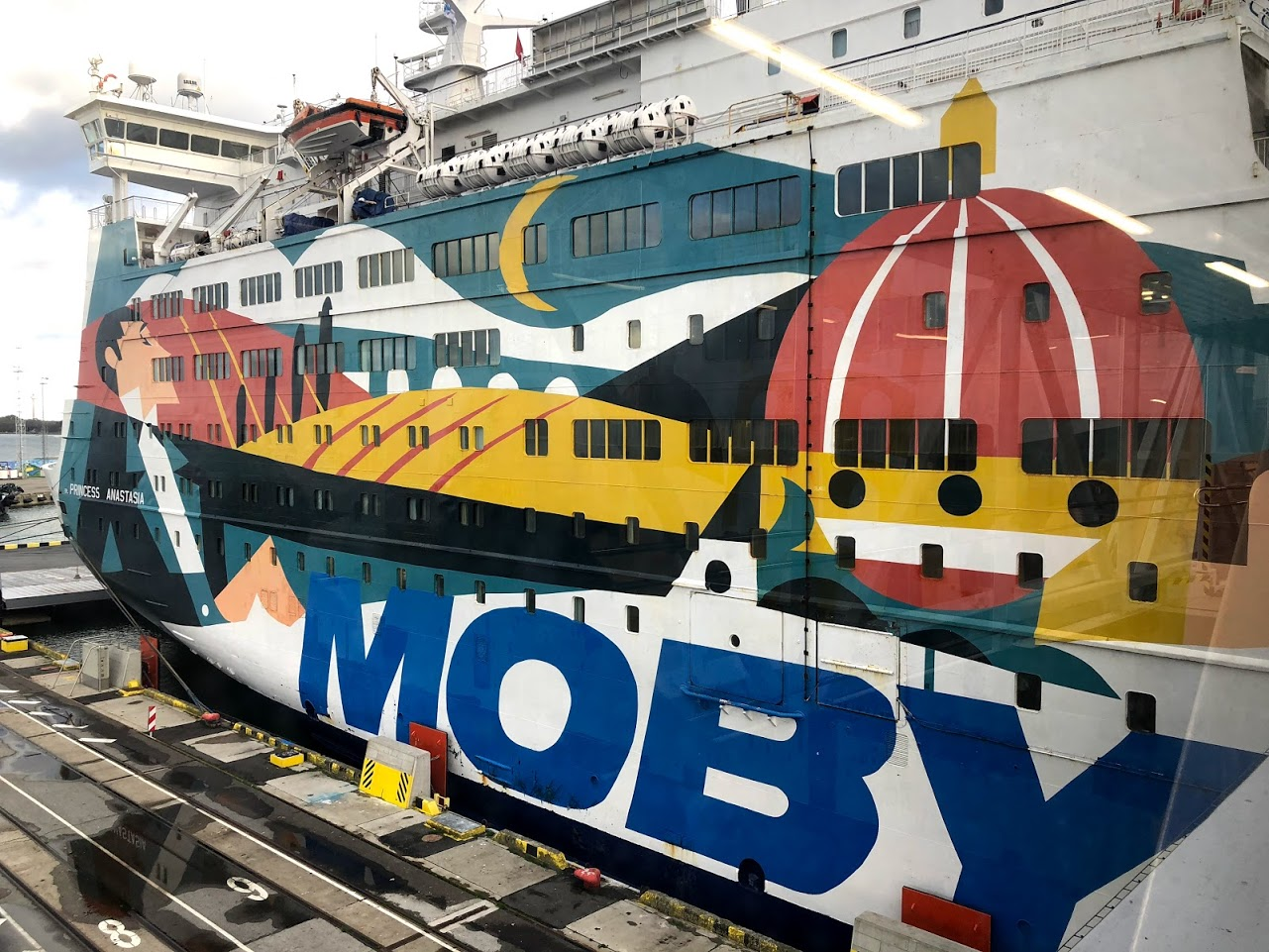
Princess Anastasia with the St. Peter Line and Moby Lines "hybrid" livery, October 2018

Princess Anastasia made her first voyage for the St. Peter Line in April 2011. She set sail from Saint Petersburg on 31 March and docked in Stockholm the next day on 1 April, completing her first passenger voyage since September 2010. The ferry was said to bring an extra 400,000 tourists to Saint Petersburg in 2011.

Until 2020 the ferry operated a circular service from Stockholm to St Petersburg stopping in Helsinki on the outward journey, and both Helsinki and Tallinn on the return journey. During the coronavirus pandemic in 2020, sailings had been cancelled and Princess Anastasia was used as an accommodation ship at a construction yard in Murmansk, where she remained until early 2022. She left the Barents sea in May 2022 and sailed to Messina in Italy for refurbishment at the Palumbo Shipyards.

==== November 2019 incident ====
On the evening of 6 November 2019 Princess Anastasia ran aground outside Lidingö in Stockholm en route to Helsinki, after suffering a black-out of the ship's electrical systems. The ferry was towed back to Stockholm and was inspected. She had not sustained any major damage, and was able to continue to Helsinki the next morning. There were no reported injuries to any of the 1065 passengers and crew on board at the time of the accident. The Swedish Transportation Agency believed the black-out to have been caused by a mixture of Russian and Swedish diesel oil creating a blockage.

=== Moby Lines ===
After a major refurbishment in Messina she was due to enter service with Moby Lines in February 2023, renamed Moby Orli.
